= Poirot (surname) =

Poirot (English: /pwɑːˈroʊ/, French: [pwaʁo]) is a French surname.

== People ==
Notable people with the surname include:

- Catherine Poirot (born 1963), French swimmer
- Christian Poirot (born 1956), French biathlete
- Gervais Poirot (1942–2008), French skier
- Gilbert Poirot (1944–2012), French ski jumper
- Jefferson Poirot (born 1992), French rugby union player
- Lionel Poirot (born 1973), French swimmer
- Louis Antoine de Poirot (1735–1813), Jesuit painter
- Nicolás Vigneaux Poirot (born 1997), Chilean actor
- Philippe Poirot (born 1958), French cross-country skier
- Stéphane Poirot (born 1970), French bobsledder

== Fictional characters ==
- Hercule Poirot, a detective created by Agatha Christie
- Achille Poirot, Hercule's supposed twin brother in Agatha Christie's novel The Big Four (1927)
- Thomas Poirot, a character from the French silent film Fun With the Bridal Party (1905)

== See also ==
- Bertrand Poirot-Delpech (1929–2006), French writer
- Julie Poirot-Delpech Wolkenstein (born 1968), French writer
