= Pierrot (disambiguation) =

Pierrot is a stock character in pantomime.

- Pierrot Grenade, a Caribbean carnival character

Pierrot may also refer to:

== Books ==
- Pierrot (poem), a 1926 poem by Langston Hughes
- "Pierrot", poem by Sara Teasdale
- "Pierrot" (short story), an 1882 short story by Guy de Maupassant

== Entertainment ==
- Studio Pierrot, a Japanese animation studio
- Pierrot's Troupe, a theatre group in New Delhi, India

== Music ==
- Pierrot (band), a Japanese rock band
- "Pierrot", a song by Luiz Bonfá and Maria Toledo from the 1965 album Braziliana
- "Pierrot", a song by Steve Hackett from the 1988 album Momentum
- "Pierrot" (Aya Kamiki song), 2006
- "Pierrot", a song by Le Sserafim from the 2024 EP Crazy
- "Pierrot", a work by Thea Musgrave
- "Pierrot", a work by Ernesto Nazareth
- "Pierrot", a song composed by Charles Tomlinson Griffes to poem by Sara Teasdale
- Pierrot ensemble, a type of musical ensemble named after Arnold Schoenberg's composition Pierrot lunaire.

== People ==
- a nickname of the French name Pierre
- Pierrot troupe or Pierrot show, British variety shows popular from the 1920s to the 1940s
- George Arnold (poet) (1834–1865), American journalist and poet who went by this name
- Pierrot (Tamás Z. Marosi) (born 1969), Hungarian pop singer, game designer and musician
- Frantzdy Pierrot (born 1995), Haitian association footballer.

== Other ==
- Tarucus, a butterfly genus containing many species known as Pierrots
- Pierrot (painting), a painting by Antoine Watteau

== See also ==
- Poirot (disambiguation)
- Pierrette (disambiguation)
- Pierre (disambiguation)
- Peter (disambiguation)
