= Prince's Building =

Building in Central, Hong Kong

Coordinates: 22.28124°N 114.15933°E

- Traditional Chinese: 太子大廈
- Simplified Chinese: 太子大厦
Transcriptions
Standard Mandarin
- Hanyu Pinyin: Tàizǐ Dàshà
Yue: Cantonese
- Yale Romanization: Taai jí daaih haah
- Jyutping: Taai3 zi2 daai6 haa6

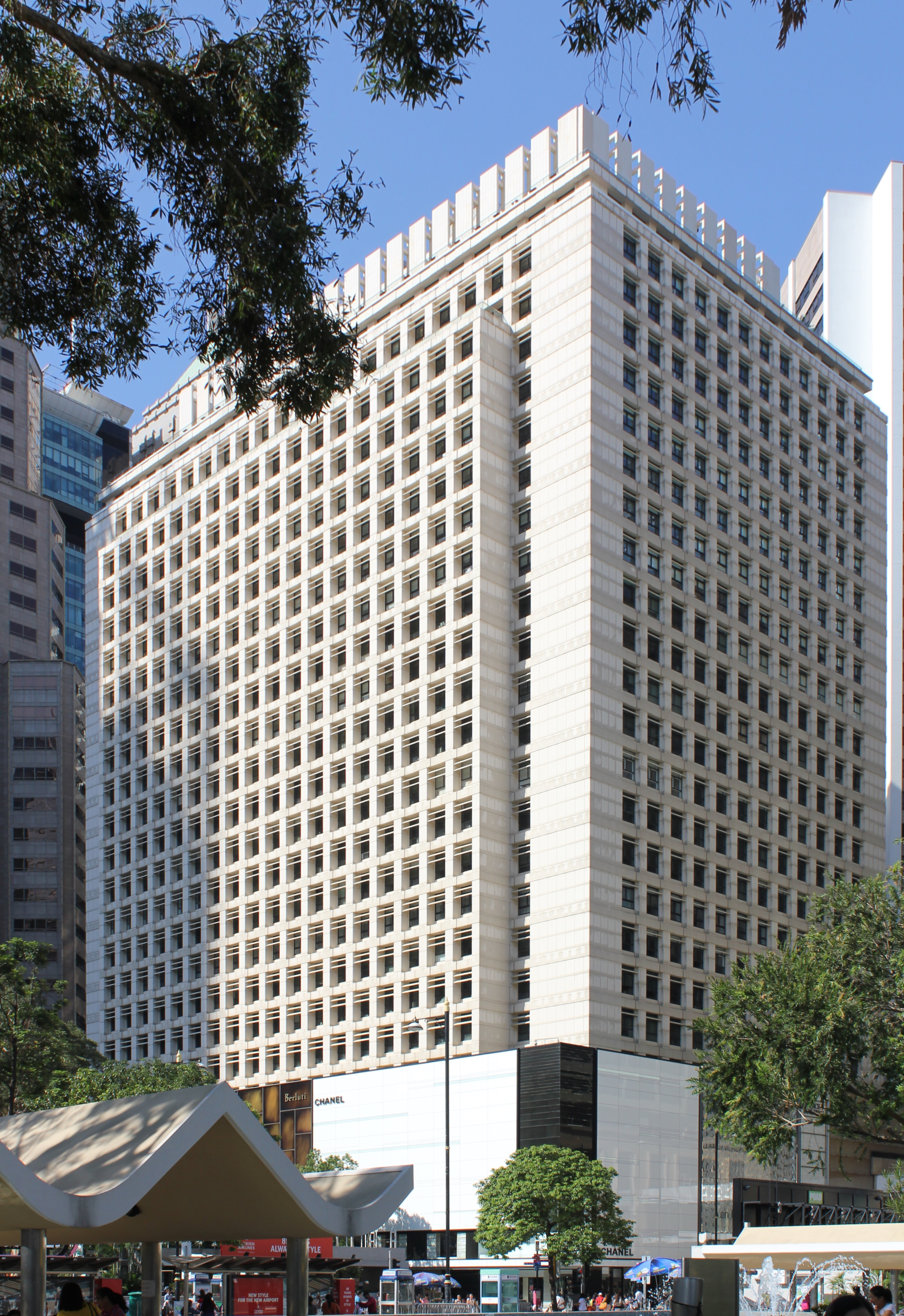
2nd Prince's Building (1965) viewing from the Statue Square

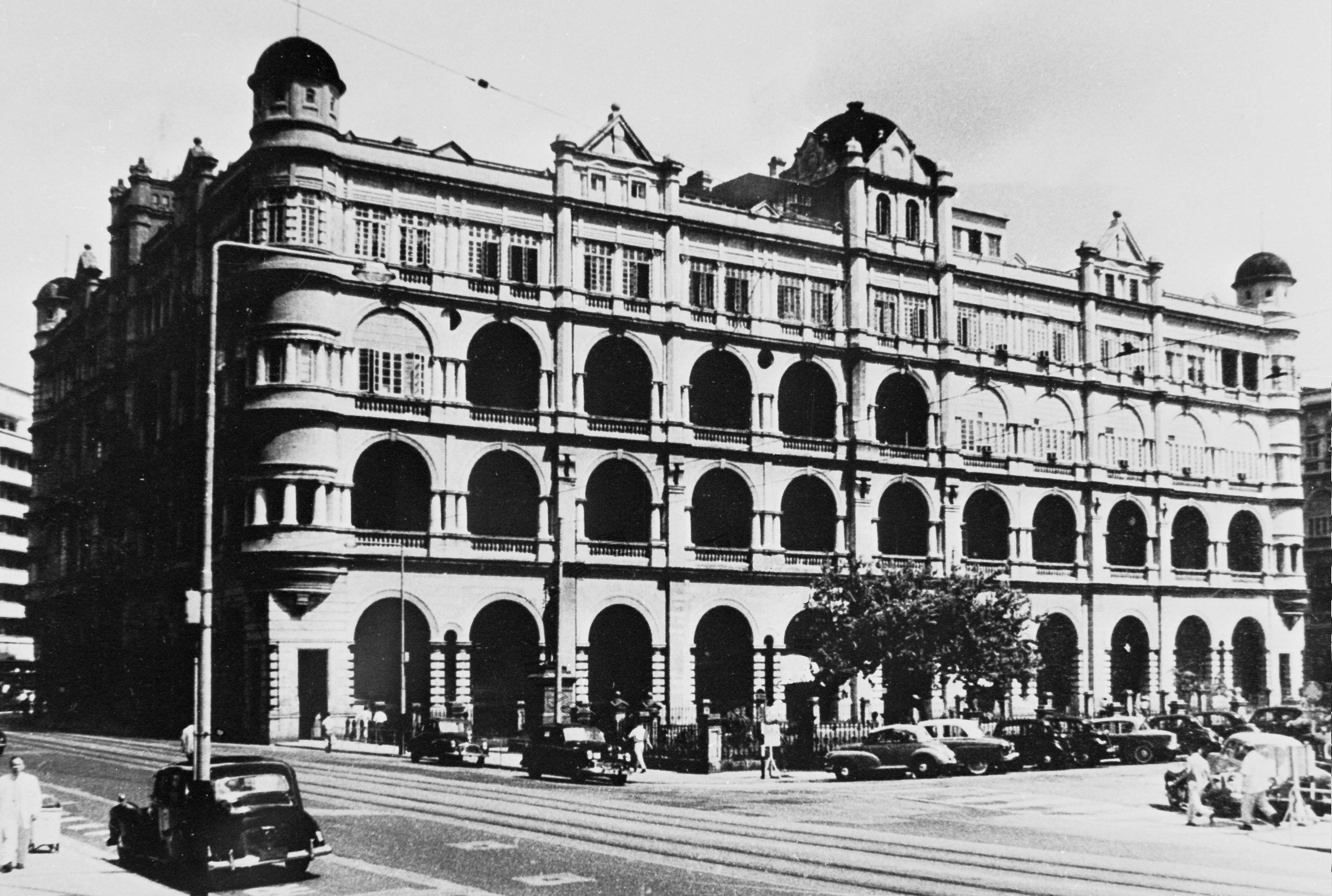
Original Prince's Building c. 1945, built 1904 and demolished 1963

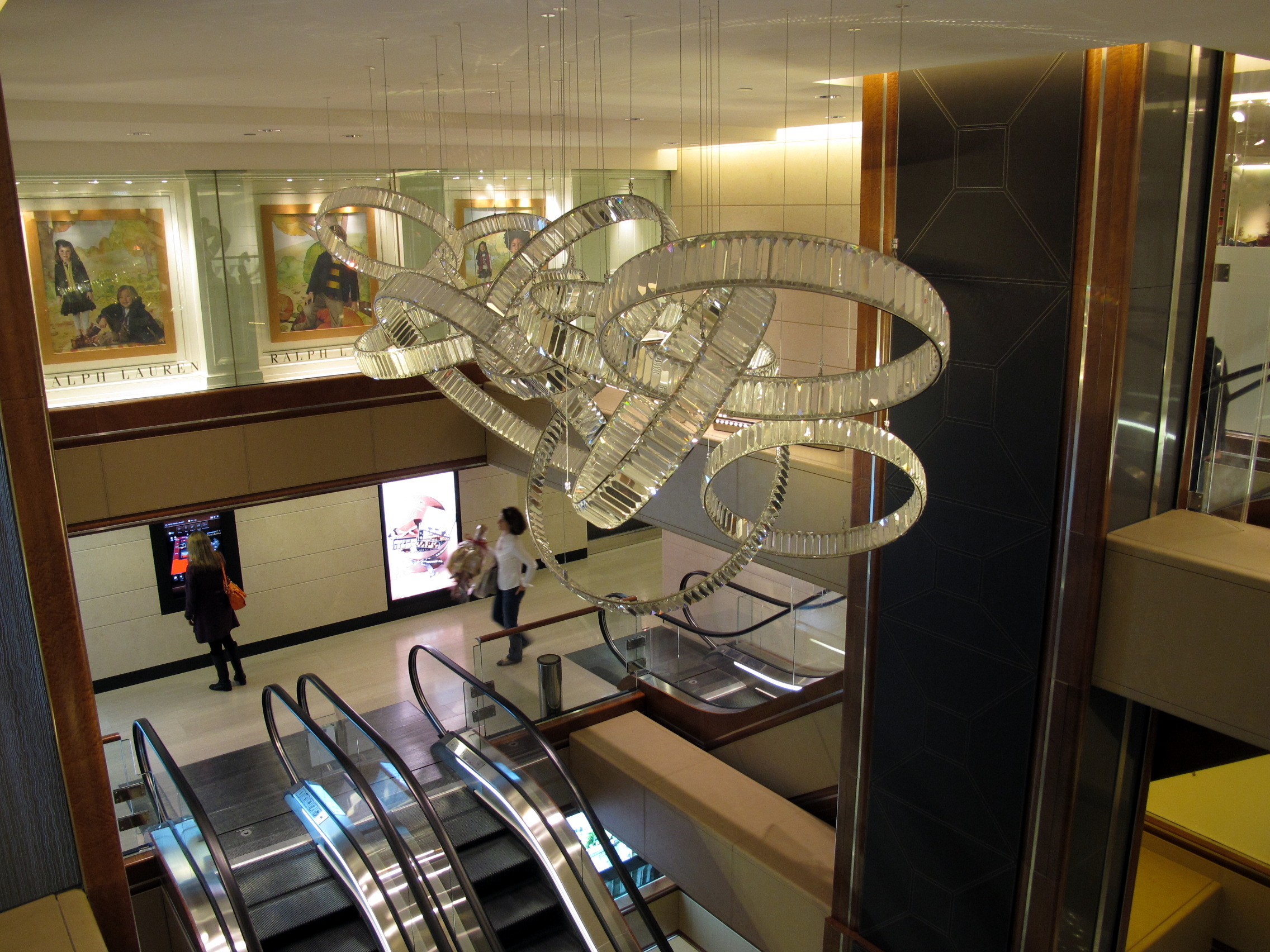
Interior of Prince's Building (2011)

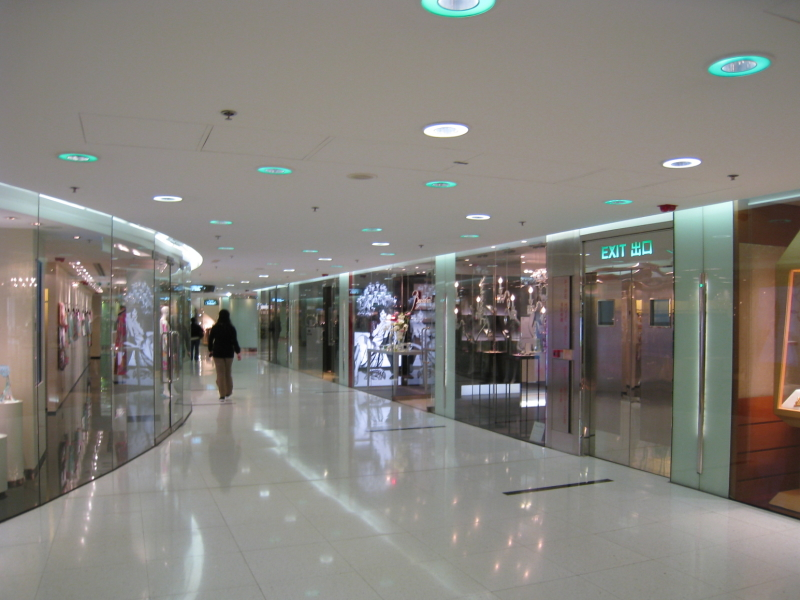
Interior of Prince's Building (2008)

Prince's Building is an office tower with a six-level shopping centre, known as Landmark Prince's. Located along the western side of the southern section of Statue Square in Central, Hong Kong near Central station, the building is connected to Alexandra House and Mandarin Oriental, Hong Kong by pedestrian footbridges.

== First generation ==
The first Prince's Building was a four-storey Renaissance architecture building in 1904 on land created from the Chater reclamation, located directly south of Queen's Building, completed in 1899. The building was designed by Leigh & Orange and had similarities with the Hong Kong Club Building built in 1897. It was replaced by the present building in 1965.

The first building housed several bank and law firm offices including:

- Yokohama Specie Bank
- Bank of Taiwan
- Banque de l'Indochine
- Deacons
- Johnson Stokes & Master

== Second generation ==
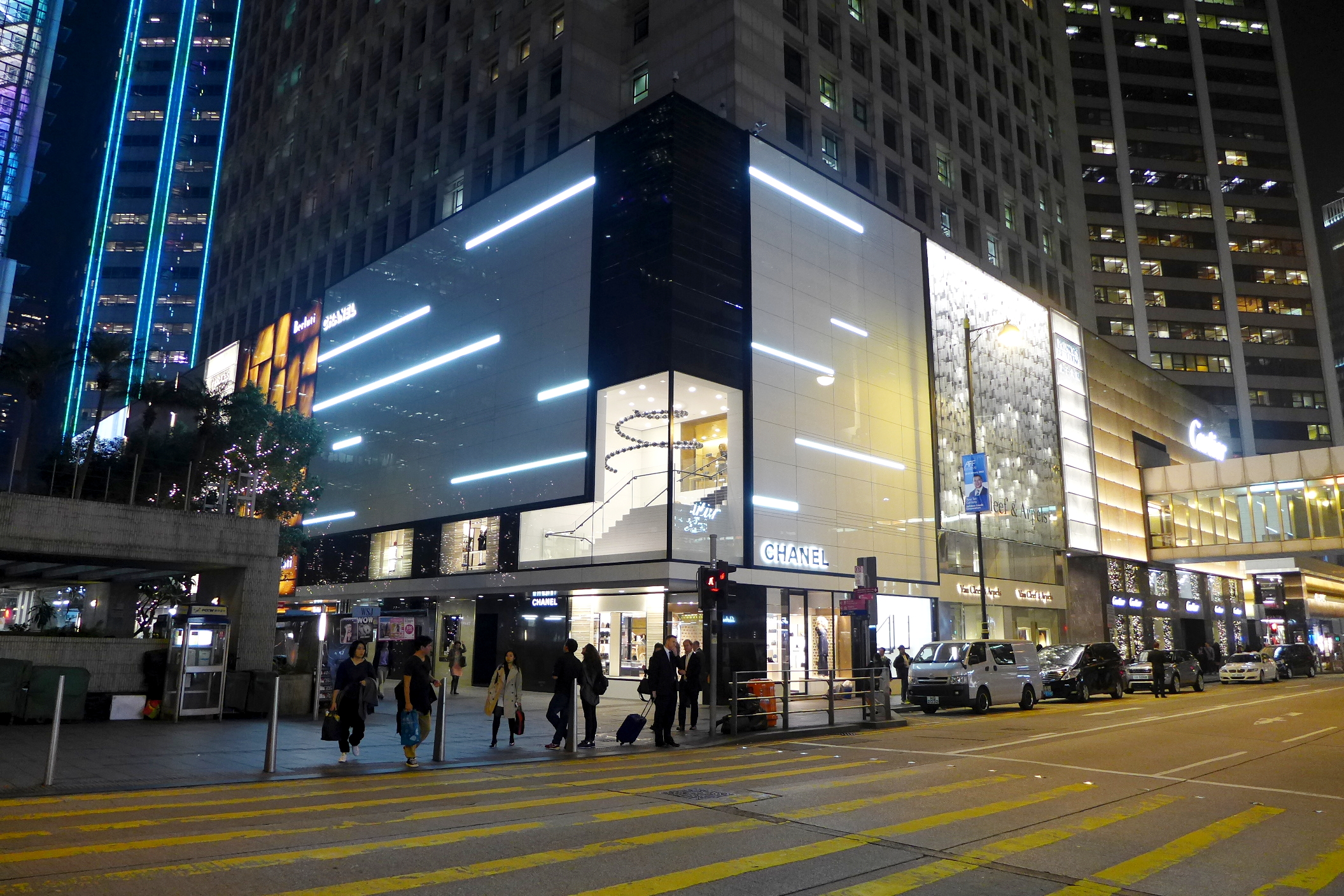
The Chanel flagship store at Landmark Prince's

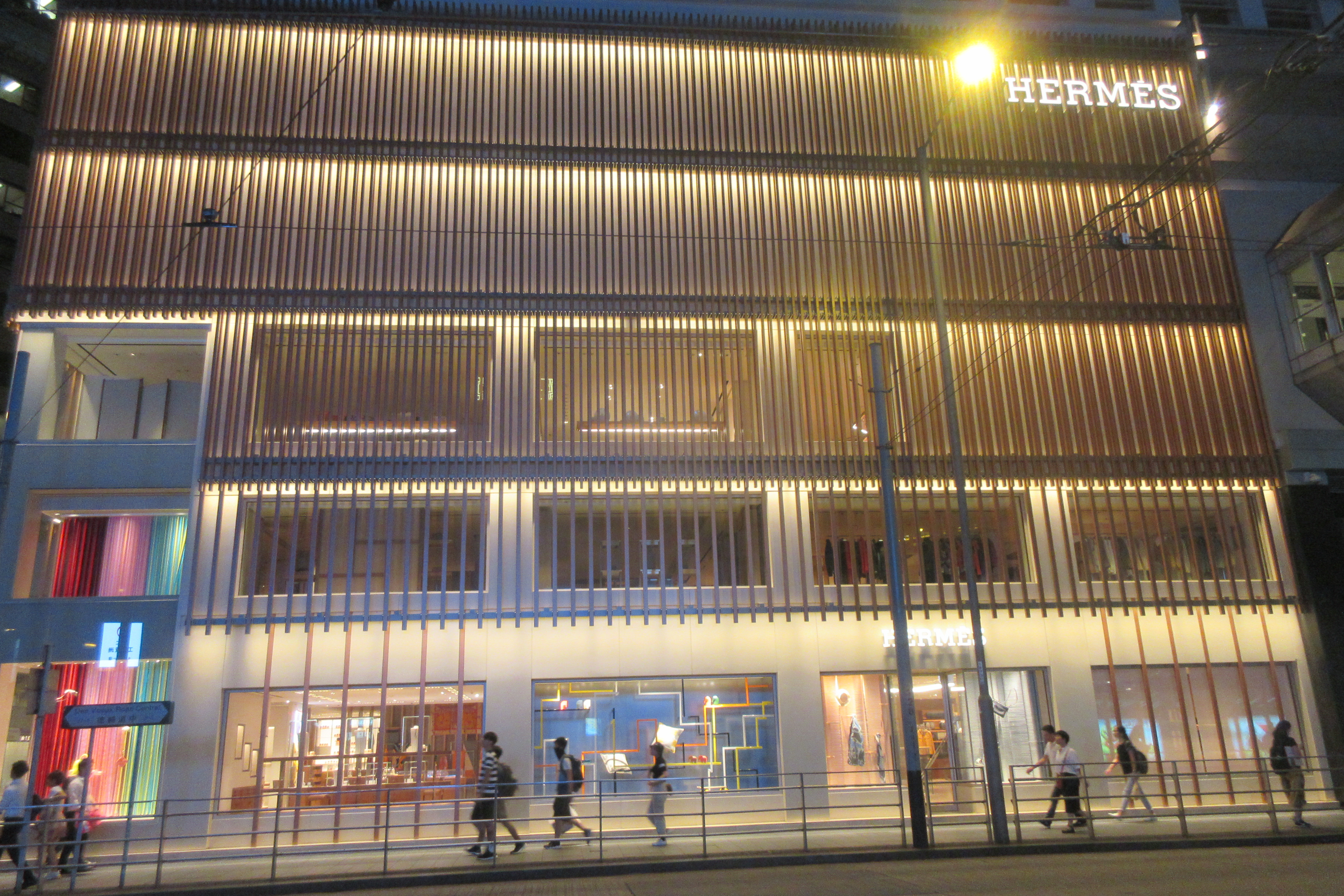
The Hermès flagship store at Landmark Prince's

In 1963, the first building was demolished to make way for the current Prince's Building. It was designed by architecture firm Palmer & Turner. The 29 floor complex is an office and retail complex and is owned by Hongkong Land.

In 1965, Hongkong Land constructed the first air-conditioned pedestrian bridge in Hong Kong, connecting Prince's Building to The Mandarin Hotel. This concept was later adapted by other developers, and formed the Central Elevated Walkway system.

The six levels of retail floors, now known as Landmark Prince's, house flagship stores of luxury brands including Cartier, Chanel, Van Cleef & Arpels, Hermès, A. Lange & Söhne, Baccarat, Berluti, Chopard, Christian Louboutin, Chrome Hearts, Damiani, Jaeger-LeCoultre, Buccellati, F. P. Journe, Qeelin, Panerai and Vacheron Constantin. Landmark Prince's is also known for smaller upmarket boutique-style shops on its second and third floors; these two retail floors are branded as "Landmark Home & Kids".

Tenants of the office tower currently include Mayer Brown JSM, KPMG, and PricewaterhouseCoopers.

The complex adjoins Statue Square, which it surrounds together with Hong Kong Club Building, Old Supreme Court Building, Mandarin Oriental (former site of Queen's Building) and HSBC Main Building.

== See also ==
- King's Building
- Alexandra House
- The Landmark
- Hongkong Land
- Statue Square
