= Poirot (disambiguation) =

Hercule Poirot is a fictional detective created by Agatha Christie.

Poirot may also refer to:

- Agatha Christie's Poirot (TV series), also released as Poirot, an ITV mystery detective fiction show (1989–2013)
- Poirot Award, an award for contributions to mystery fiction by non-writers
- Poirot (surname), a French-language surname

== See also ==
- Pierrot (disambiguation)
- Hercule Poirot (disambiguation)
