= Pierrette =

A Pierrette is, in the theatre, a female Pierrot

Pierrette may also refer to:

- Marie-Anne Pierrette Paulze (1758–1836), French chemist, and wife of Antoine Lavoisier
- Olga Bancic (1912–1944), Jewish–Romanian activist in the French Resistance
- Paul and Pierrette Girault de Coursac, two French historians who specialise in the life of Louis XVI and Marie-Antoinette
- Pierrette Le Pen (born 1935), ex-wife of Jean-Marie Le Pen and mother of Marine Le Pen
- Pierrette Adams (born 1962), singer from the Republic of the Congo
- Pierrette Alarie, CC, CQ (1921–2011), French Canadian coloratura soprano
- Pierrette Mari (born 1929), French composer
- Pierrette Ringuette (born 1955), Canadian Senator
- Pierrette Venne (born 1945), member of the Canadian House of Commons from 1988 to 2003
- Pierrette-Henriette Clostermann, a.k.a. Perrine H. Clostermann, a character from the anime/manga franchise Strike Witches

== See also ==
- Les Noces de Pierrette, 1905 painting by Spanish artist Pablo Picasso
- Pierrot (disambiguation)
- Pierre (disambiguation)
