= Hercule Poirot (disambiguation) =

Hercule Poirot (UK: /ˈɛərkjuːl ˈpwɑːroʊ/, US: /hɜːrˈkjuːl pwɑːˈroʊ/) is a fictional detective created by Agatha Christie.

Hercule Poirot may also refer to:

- Hercule Poirot (film series), a mystery film series developed by 20th Century Studios
- Hercule Poirot (British radio series), a 1985 BBC Radio drama
- Hercule Poirot (American radio series), a 1945 American radio mystery drama

== See also ==
- Poirot (disambiguation)
- Hercule Poirot in literature
