= St Andrew's Church, Kowloon =

Coordinates: 22.3019°N 114.1724°E

St Andrew's Church Kowloon
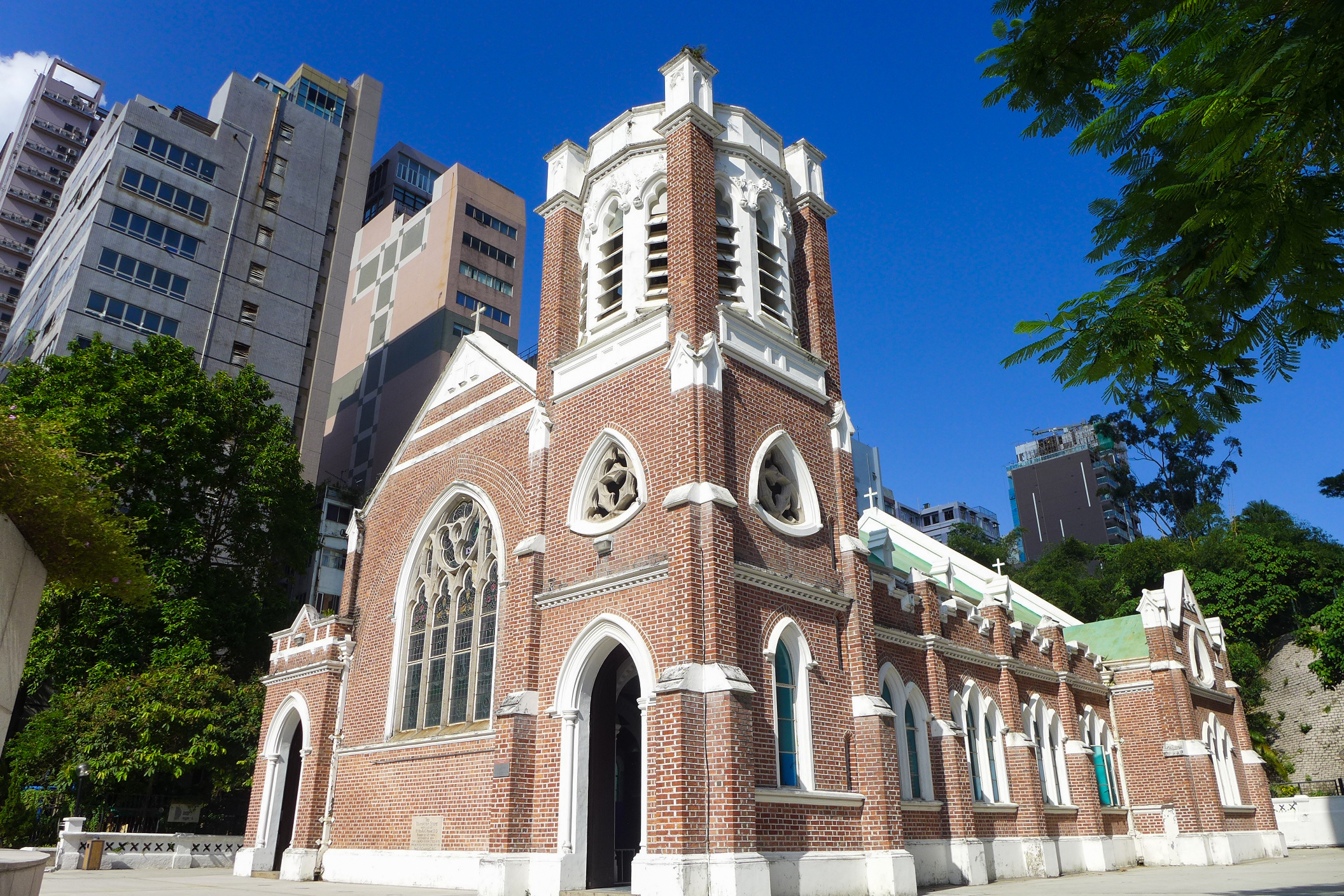
- Facade of St Andrew's Church in September 2017
- St Andrew's Church Kowloon
- Location: 138 Nathan Road, Tsim Sha Tsui, Kowloon, Hong Kong
- Country: China
- Denomination: Anglican church, Province of Hong Kong Sheng Kung Hui
- Churchmanship: Anglican, Evangelical
- Website: www.standrews.org.hk

History
- Founded: 13 December 1904; 121 years ago
- Consecrated: 6 October 1906; 119 years ago

Architecture
- Functional status: Active
- Heritage designation: Listed Grade I historic building in Hong Kong
- Architect: Leigh & Orange
- Style: Victorian Gothic

Clergy
- Vicar: Rev Alex McCoy

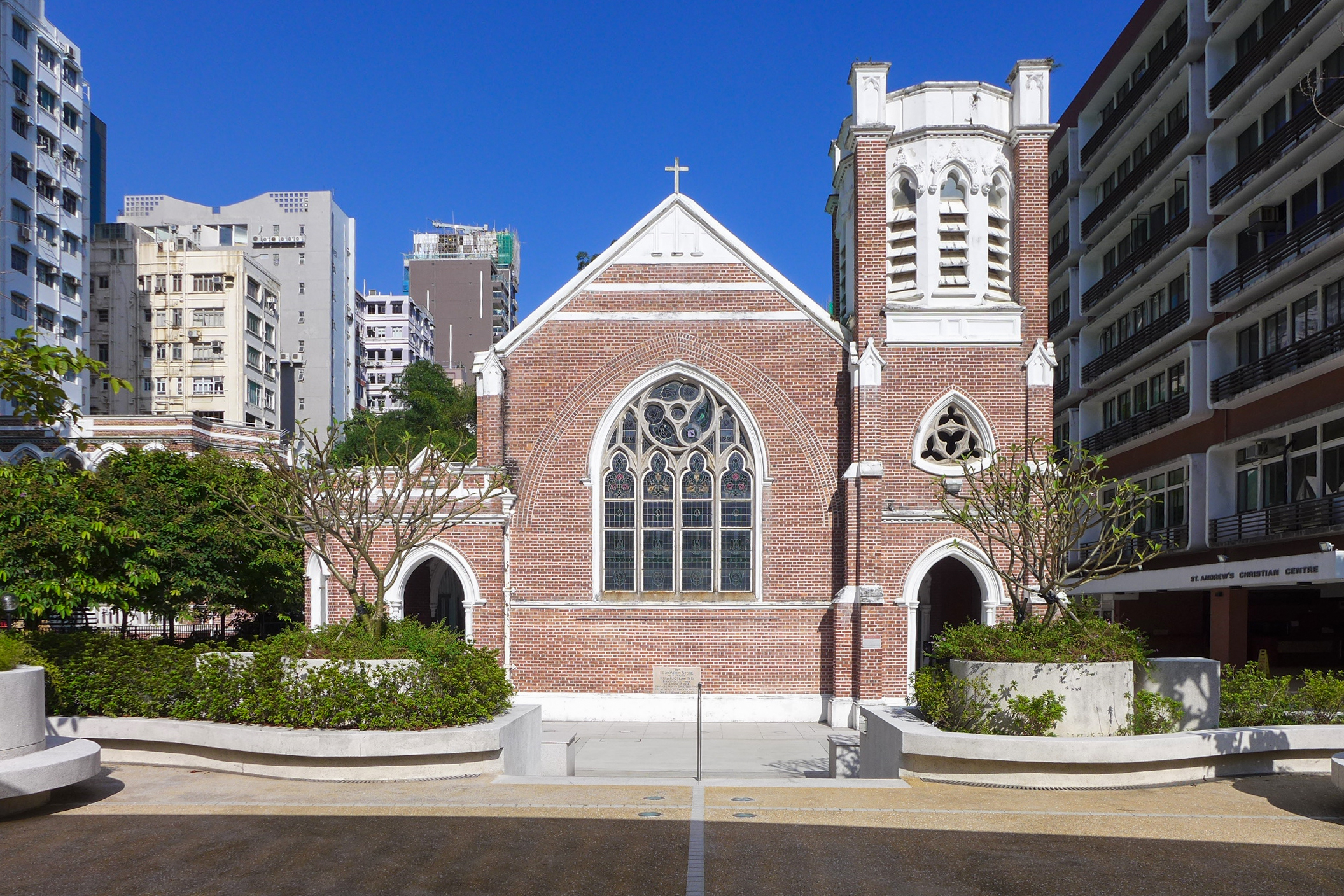
Facade of St Andrew's Church in September 2017

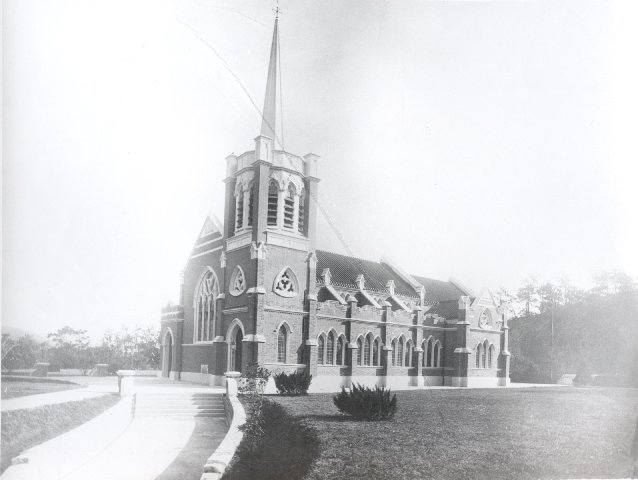
St Andrews c.1906

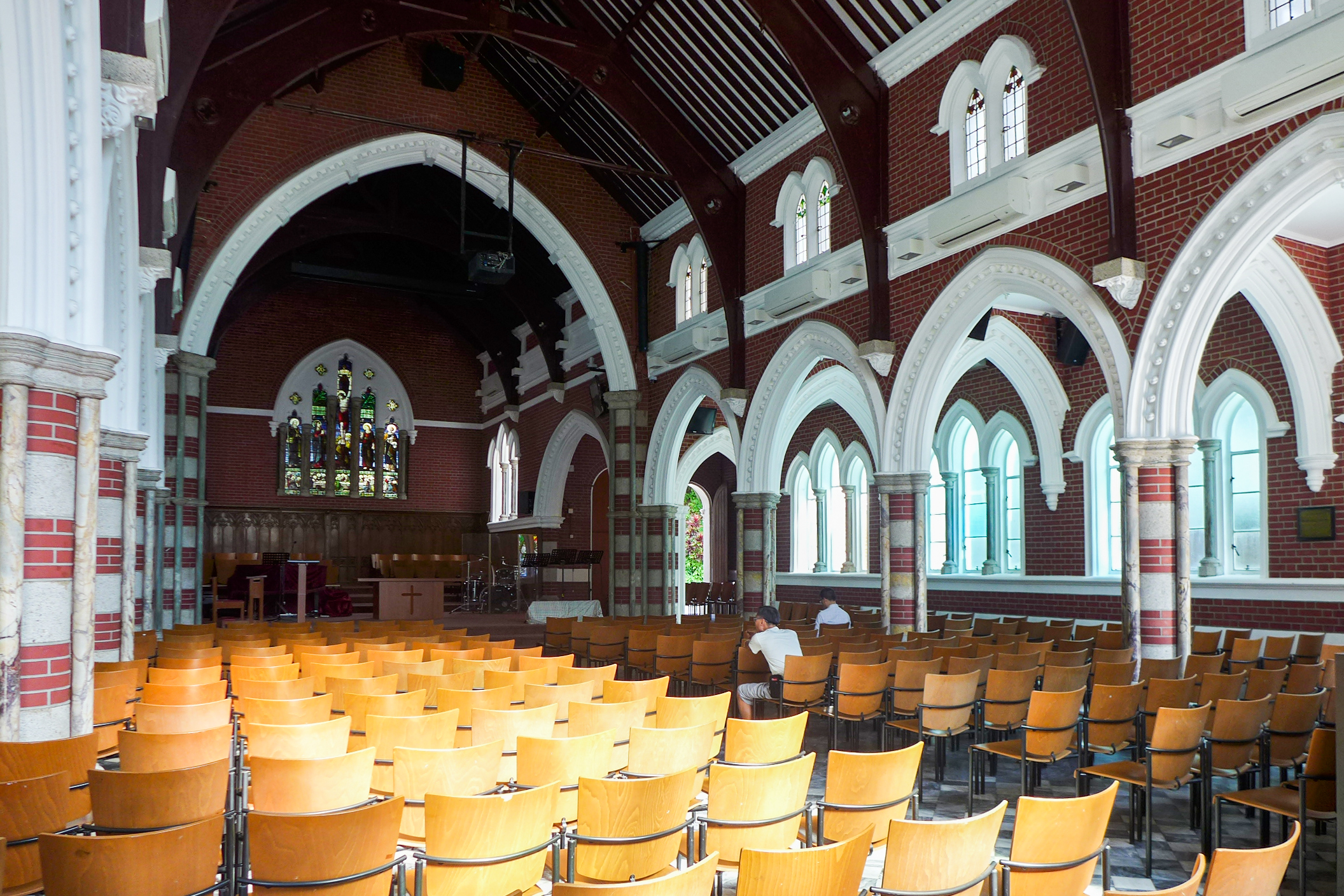
Interior of the church in September 2017

St Andrew's Church (Chinese: 聖安德烈堂) is located at 138 Nathan Road, Kowloon, . It is an English-speaking church of the Anglican (Sheng Kung Hui) Province of Hong Kong and in the Diocese of Western Kowloon. It is the oldest English-speaking Protestant church in Kowloon. While St Andrew's commenced its life as a church for the expatriate community, it is now an international church with 90% of those attending considering Hong Kong as their home.

As the church stands directly opposite Kowloon Park, the church receives considerable foot traffic. As well as the core church membership, many hundreds of visitors come to St Andrew's, bringing the average number of those coming through its doors for services on Sundays to around 2,000 every week. St Andrew's has an international congregation, with worshippers of all ages.

== Sunday services ==
Sunday services are currently held at 8:30am, 9:30am, 11:30am and 5:00pm in English, and at 11:30am in Putonghua (Mandarin). The Lord's Supper (Holy Communion) is administered at the 8:30am service every Sunday. At all other services, it is administered on the second and fourth Sundays. Check the official website for the latest information.

== History ==
The idea of building an Anglican church in Kowloon was first suggested in 1897 but no progress was made until 1904, when Sir Catchick Paul Chater financed the construction. The chosen site was next to a large garden area owned by Sir Paul, covering the area between Robinson Road (now Nathan Road) and Austin Road.

The church was designed by Alfred Bryer of Messrs. Leigh & Orange. Work began in November 1904 and was completed in 1906. The church was consecrated on 6 October 1906.

The Old Vicarage was finished in 1909.

In 1913, a close relationship began with the Diocesan Girls' School, which moved to 1 Jordan Road.

The war years from 1914 to 1918 were difficult for the church because many of its members came from the military bases on Kowloon and had to leave for duty elsewhere. The church was barely able to survive financially.

From 1942 to 1944, the congregation of All Saints Mong Kok used St Andrew's for services as their church was used as a rice store. They were allowed back to All Saints in late 1944 and took much of the furniture from St Andrew's with them, saving it from destruction when the main church building was turned into a Shinto shrine early in 1945.

The church organised its first Sunday school in 1947.

The Lych Gate and steps were added in 1954 to mark the 50th anniversary of the laying of the church foundation stone.

In 1978, St Andrew's Christian Centre (a 6-storey building that includes apartments, offices and a hall) was opened.

St Andrew's Church planted Resurrection Church (Sai Kung) in 1983 and Shatin Church in 1990.

In 1997, St Andrew's held special services on the Sunday before the handover of Hong Kong to China. The morning service “Our Transition and Hope” was broadcast on the BBC World Service. In the evening there was a reconciliation service with local Chinese churches.

In 2006, the centenary refurbishment of the church received an Award of Merit from the UNESCO Asia-Pacific Awards for Cultural Heritage Conservation. The church was praised for "a thorough conservation approach which sought to fully understand the building's significance and deterioration process before proposing solutions".

In 2009, the church launched its “2020Vision” which led to the construction of the "Life Centre", a new building at the foot of the hill, facing onto Nathan Road. Construction began in 2010 and was completed in 2015. The Life Centre houses a large auditorium and multi-purpose rooms, with a landscaped garden above. The design won a Merit Award from the American Institute of Architects Hong Kong Chapter in 2011.

in 2021, a funeral service was held for TVB actor Liu Kai Chi.

== Architectural style ==
The church was designed by the architects Leigh & Orange in the Victorian Gothic style. It is built of red brick and granite, laid on rammed earth foundations. The bricks on the external walls are exposed and pointed with a lime-based mortar. Interior walls are rendered with raised mortar joints and painted to represent the underlying brick pattern.

The stained glass in the altar and baptismal windows is the original glass, dating from 1906, made by William Morris & Co of Westminster, London. More contemporary Art Nouveau style coloured glass was installed later in the West window and upper nave windows. To commemorate the church's centenary, two pictorial coloured glass windows were installed in the transepts.

The church's bell tower used to have a tall spire which eventually had to be removed due to repeated structural damage from typhoons. The bells are the original carillon of 8 bronze tubular bells from Harrington's of Coventry, England, installed in 1906.

Other heritage buildings in the church compound include the two-storey Old Vicarage built in 1909, the Amahs’ Quarters and Verger's Cottage, built at around the same period. All three buildings are constructed in red brick with granite detailing. The ensemble of church buildings currently has Grade II historic building status.

== Clergy ==
St Andrew’s Church completed and consecrated on 6 October 1906. The first Vicar was Rev A. J. Stevens. The second Vicar, Rev H. O Spink was the first occupant of the vicarage. Rev Spink founded the first scout troop in Hong Kong.

== List of rectors ==
- Rev A. J. Stevens 1906 -1909
- Rev Hubert Octavius Spink 1909–1912
- Rev N. C. Pope 1912 -1918
- Rev A.T.W. Dowding 1918–1919
- Canon G.R. Lindsay 1919– 1927
- Rev W. W. Rogers 1927–1934
- Rev J. R. Higgs 1934–1940
- Rev H. A. Wittenbach (Acting Vicar) 1940–1945
- Rev J H Ogilvie 1946–1955
- Rev Eric Hague 1955–57
- Rev Owen Eva 1957–61
- Rev Jocelyn Michell 1961-8
- Rev Bob Hyatt 1969–1978
- Rev Ken Coleman 1978 -1984
- Rev John Menear 1985 -1989
- Rev John Aldis 1989–1999
- Rev Paul Kenchington 2000–2005
- Rev John Menear 2005 – 2015
- Rev Alex McCoy 2016 –

== List of Associate Ministers ==
- Rev Michael Corbett-Jones 1974-1978
- Rev Dale Hanson 1987-1991
- Rev Simon Philip Gates 1992-1996
- Rev Wing On Pang Pang 1996-2008
- Rev Dale Hanson 2005-2015
- Rev Alex McCoy 2010-2015
- Rev Dan Evers 2010-2016
- Rev Sok Han Yong 2014-2020
- Rev Ian Hadfield 2016-2019
- Rev Al Gibbs 2017-2022
- Rev Darren Pollock 2017-2024
- Rev Leslie Siu 2023 -
- Rev James Hall 2024 -
- Rev Jack Wong 2025 -

== Present day ==
St Andrew's celebrates five services each Sunday four of which are in English: an early morning Holy Communion service at 8:30 am in the Old Church, followed by three other English services at 9:30 am and 11:30 am and an evening service at 5:00 pm. There is also a Putonghua service at 11:30am in the Old Church.

Sermons from Sunday services are uploaded for free streaming and download by the following Monday afternoon. The archive now contains over 3,000 sermons.
