= Ohel Leah Synagogue =

Modern Orthodox synagogue in Hong Kong

- Hebrew: בית הכנסת אהל לאה; Chinese: 猶太教莉亞堂
- The exterior of the synagogue, in 2016

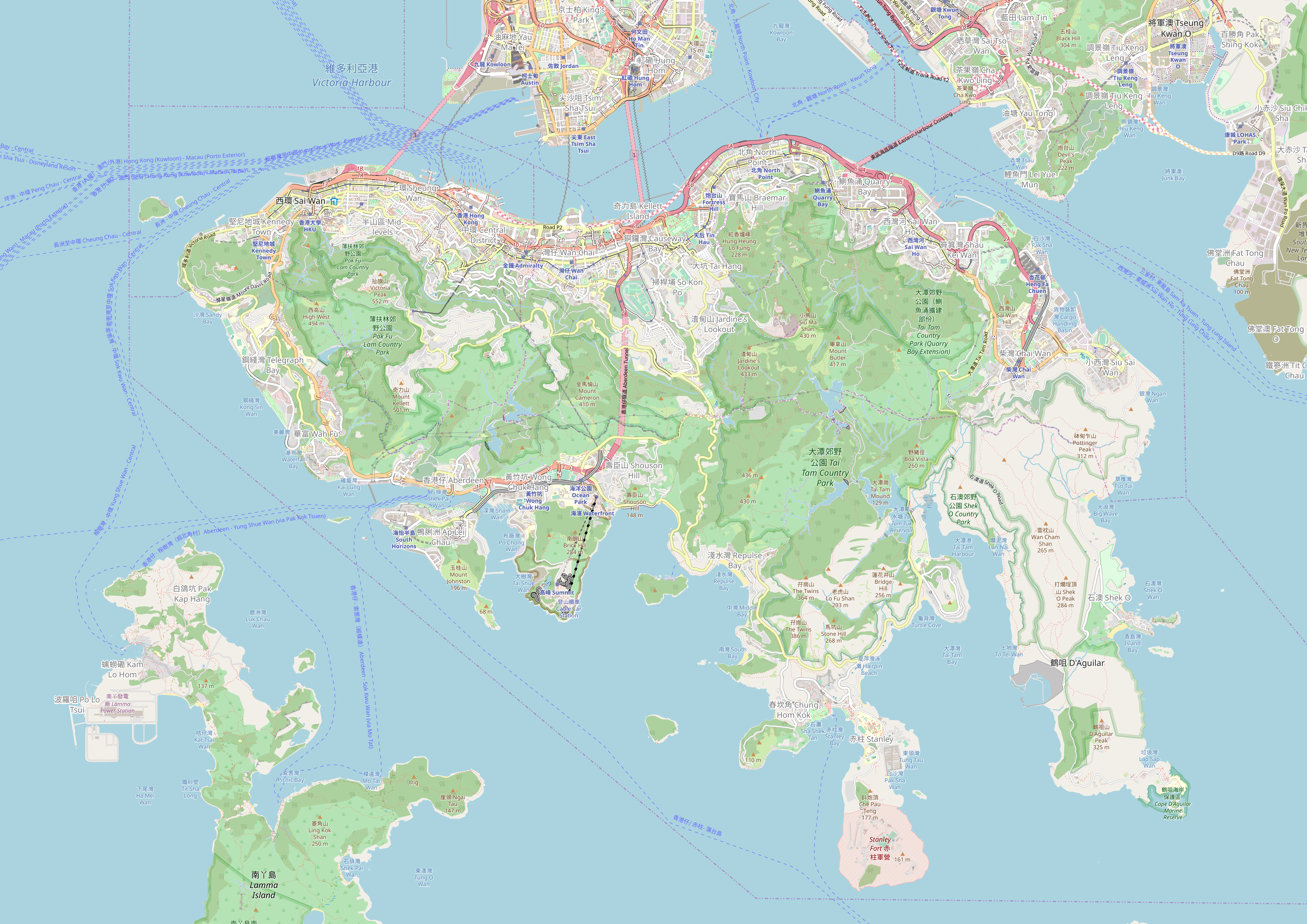
- Location of the synagogue on Hong Kong Island

Religion
- Affiliation: Modern Orthodox Judaism
- Rite: Nusach Sefard
- Ecclesiastical or organisational status: Synagogue
- Status: Active

Location
- Location: Robinson Road, Mid-Levels, Hong Kong Island, Hong Kong
- Country: China
- Interactive map of Ohel Leah Synagogue
- Coordinates: 22°16′54″N 114°08′56″E

Architecture
- Architect: Leigh & Orange
- Style: British Colonial Edwardian; Zirid architecture
- Groundbreaking: 1901
- Completed: 1902

Ohel Leah Synagogue
- Traditional Chinese: 猶太教莉亞堂
- Simplified Chinese: 犹太教莉亚堂
Transcriptions
Standard Mandarin
- Hanyu Pinyin: Yóutàijiào Lì Yà Táng
Yue: Cantonese
- Yale Romanization: Yàuh taai gāau leih nga tòhng
- Jyutping: Jau4 taai3 gaau1 lei6 ngaa3 tong4

Alternative Chinese name
- Traditional Chinese: 猶太廟
- Simplified Chinese: 犹太庙
- Literal meaning: Jewish temple
Transcriptions
Standard Mandarin
- Hanyu Pinyin: Yóutài Miào
Yue: Cantonese
- Yale Romanization: Yàuh taai miuh
- Jyutping: Jau4 taai3 miu6

The Ohel Leah Synagogue (Hebrew: בית הכנסת אהל לאה, romanized: Beit Ha-Knesset Ohel Leah; Chinese: 猶太教莉亞堂; Jyutping: jau4 taai3 gaau1 lei6 ngaa3 tong4) is a Modern Orthodox Jewish congregation and synagogue located in Hong Kong.

== Overview ==
Together with the adjacent Jewish Recreation Club and the Jewish Community Centre, the synagogue and associated facilities have formed the center of Jewish social and religious life in Hong Kong since its establishment in 1902. Originally the community was mostly Baghdadi Sephardic Jews and the synagogue was under the superintendence of the Haham of the Spanish and Portuguese Congregation of London. The congregation is now fully independent and has members from across the Jewish diaspora.

Most of Hong Kong's Jews live only a short distance away from the synagogue. An example of British Colonial Edwardian architecture, the two-storied, whitewashed, multi-turreted Synagogue nestles amid the soaring high-rises of steel and glass perched on the Mid-Levels of Hong Kong Island. The synagogue was designed by the architects Leigh & Orange and was erected in 1901–1902. In 1998, the synagogue underwent a US$6 million restoration which returned its interiors and exteriors to their original state.

The name Ohel Leah commemorates Leah Sassoon, the mother of the Sassoon brothers Jacob, Edward, and Meyer who donated the land for building the Synagogue. The Sassoons were among the earliest Sephardic merchants from India to settle in Hong Kong during the mid to late 19th century.

Ohel Leah is a Modern Orthodox congregation and received its first officially appointed rabbi in 1961. Three other Jewish congregations have also emerged more recently in Hong Kong: the Sephardic, which is dominated by Israeli expatriates; the Chabad Lubavitch; and the United Jewish Congregation, which is aligned with the more liberal Reform and Conservative movements. Many worshippers, however, hold concurrent memberships in several congregations.

== Conservation ==
The historic synagogue was listed as a Grade I historic building in July 1987. By December 1987, the listing was voluntarily removed as there was talk of demolishing the building. In order to provide the building with immediate protection against demolition, the Antiquities Authority of the Hong Kong Government declared it a proposed monument. Ohel Leah Synagogue was consequently saved based on a preservation arrangement agreed between Government and the owner. It was relisted as a Grade I historic building in 1990. Its renovation in 1998 obtained the Outstanding Project Award of the 2000 UNESCO Asia Pacific Heritage Awards for Culture Heritage Conservation.

== Gallery ==
Viewed from above

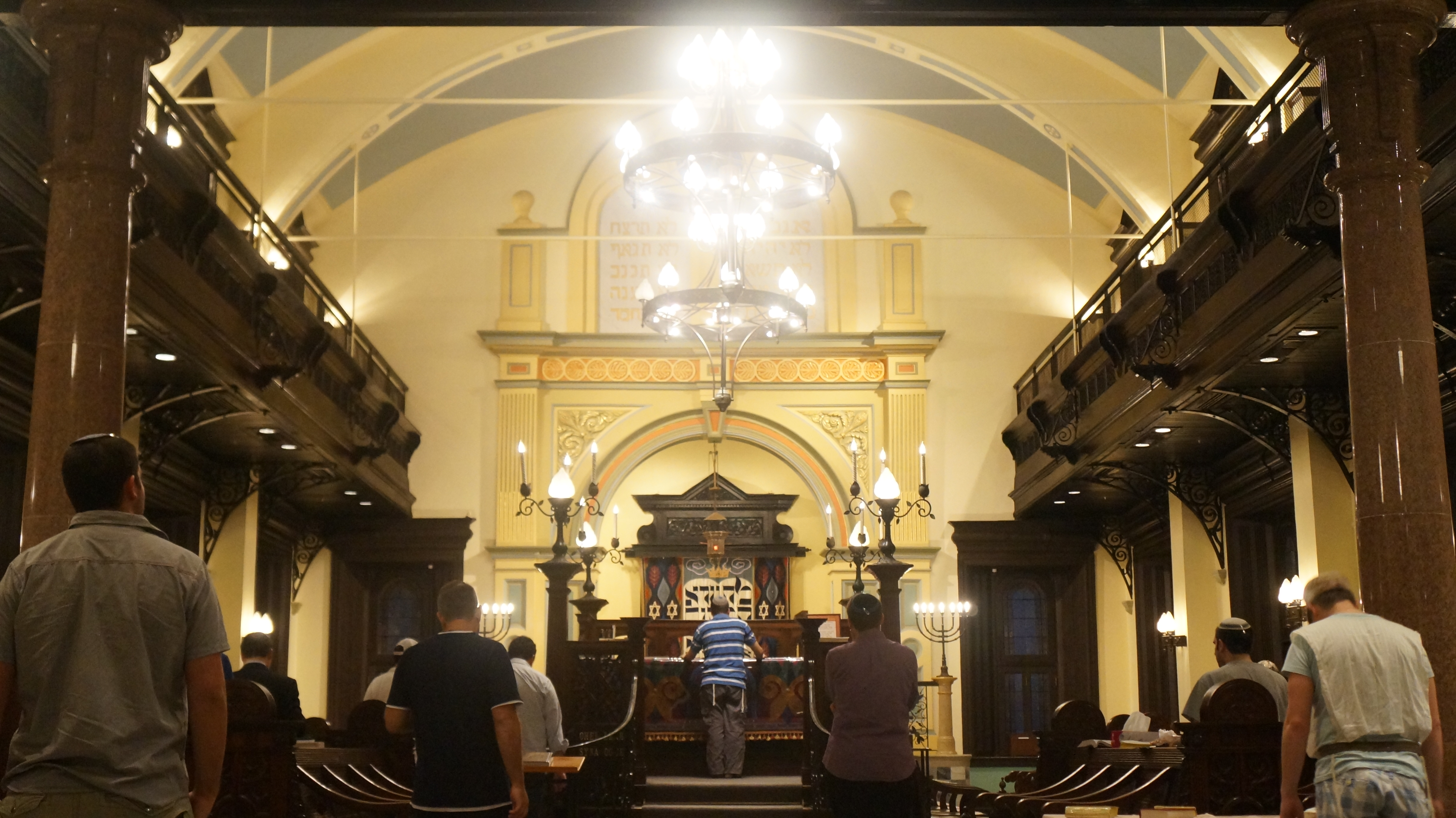
Interior

== See also ==
- Category:Jewish Hong Kong history
- List of synagogues in China
- Ohel Rachel Synagogue, built by the Sassoon family in Shanghai
