= Marble Hall (Hong Kong) =

Coordinates: 22.27785°N 114.15175°E

- 雲石堂
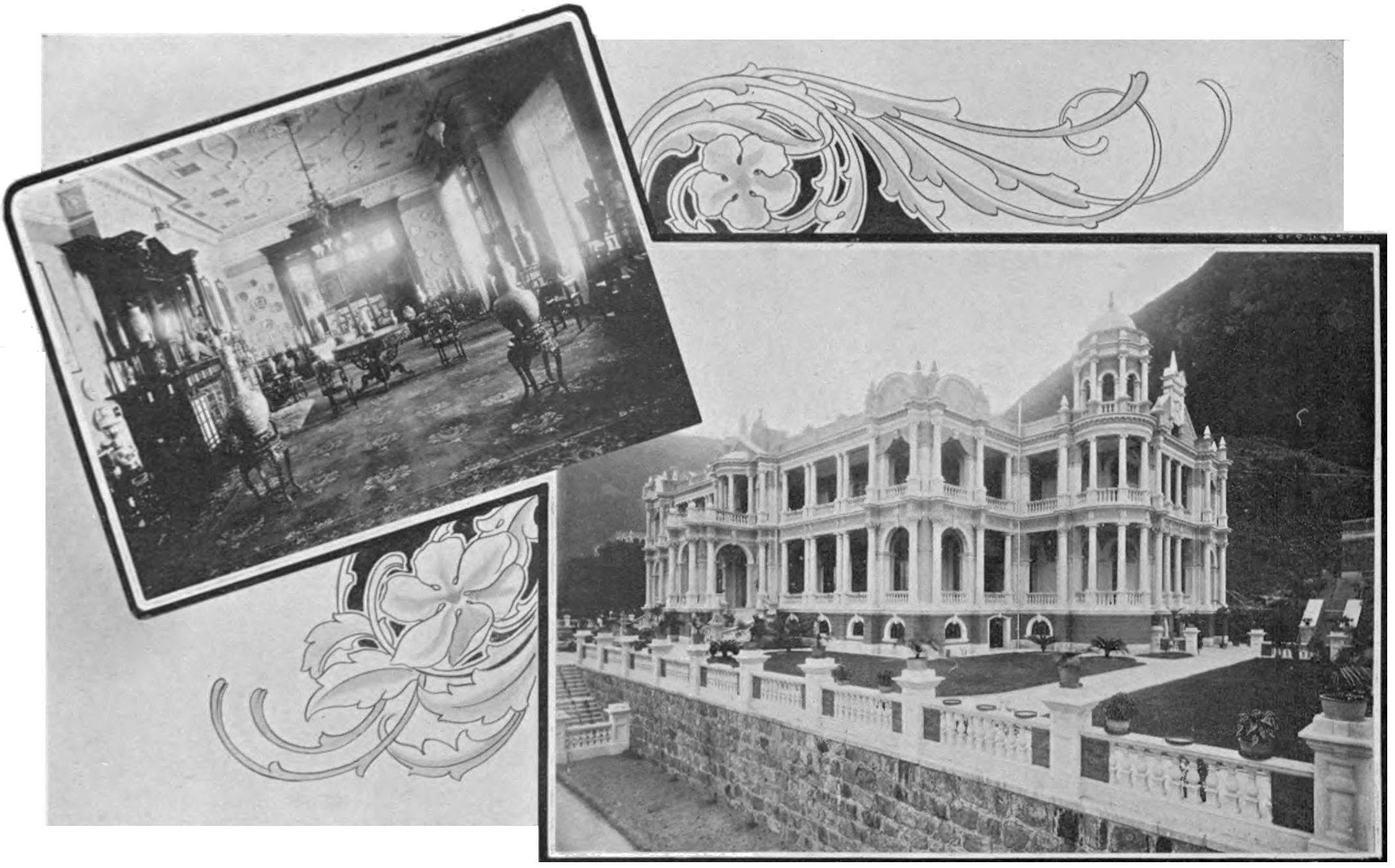
- Marble Hall in a 1908 book
- Interactive map of the Marble Hall area
- Alternative names: Admiralty House

General information
- Location: 1 Conduit Road,, Hong Kong
- Construction started: 1901
- Demolished: 1953
- Owner: Catchick Paul Chater

Technical details
- Floor count: 2

Design and construction
- Architecture firm: Leigh & Orange

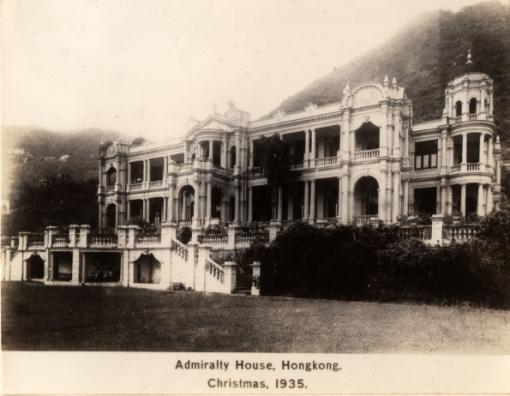
A 1935 Christmas postcard from Hong Kong, featuring Admiralty House.

Marble Hall (Chinese: 雲石堂) was the private residence of Sir Catchick Paul Chater, co-founder of Hongkong Land. It was situated at 1 Conduit Road, Hong Kong, and constructed 1901–1904 from imported European marble. Historians regard it as one of the finest ever examples of architecture in Hong Kong.

== History ==
Sir Paul chose a site above Victoria, 500 feet above sea level. Designed by Leigh & Orange, a most sumptuous residence was constructed from imported marble quarried in Italy and Greece and finished in Belgium. It had extensive gardens, and a gatehouse. Historians regard 'Marble Hall' as among the finest constructions ever executed in Hong Kong. Externally, it was constructed of stuccoed brick. Inside was a magnificent staircase made from Italian marble; it was finished in teak and mahogany.(p41)

He has a lovely house full of wonderful china, and gave us an excellent meal with superlative wine. His collection of china is well known and, though much of it is said to be faked, the pieces are really beautiful, but the furnishing of the rest of the house is in atrocious taste

— Commander C.H. Drage

Chater died in 1926, and bequeathed Marble Hall and its entire contents, including his unique collection of porcelain and paintings, to Hong Kong. While Chater's wife was allowed to live in Marble Hall as a life tenant until her death in 1935, some source mention that she may have left Hong Kong in 1927. Ownership passed to the government after her death. It became "Admiralty House" – the official residence of the Naval Commander-in-Chief, and was commandeered by Japanese during their occupation.

=== Post-war ===
Marble Hall accidentally burned down in 1946, and the government buildings occupied the site since its demolition in 1953. Government residences named 'Chater Hall Flats' are today located on the site of Marble Hall.

All that remains today is the gatekeeper's lodge, which has been given a Grade 2 classification by the Antiquities Advisory Board.

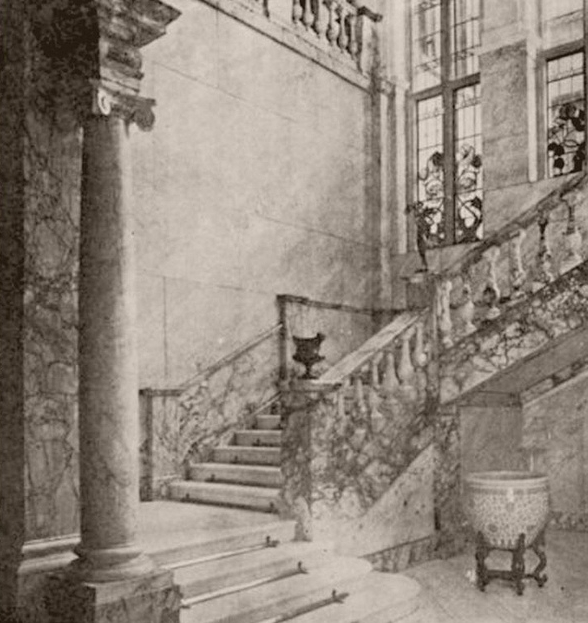
Marble staircase inside the property

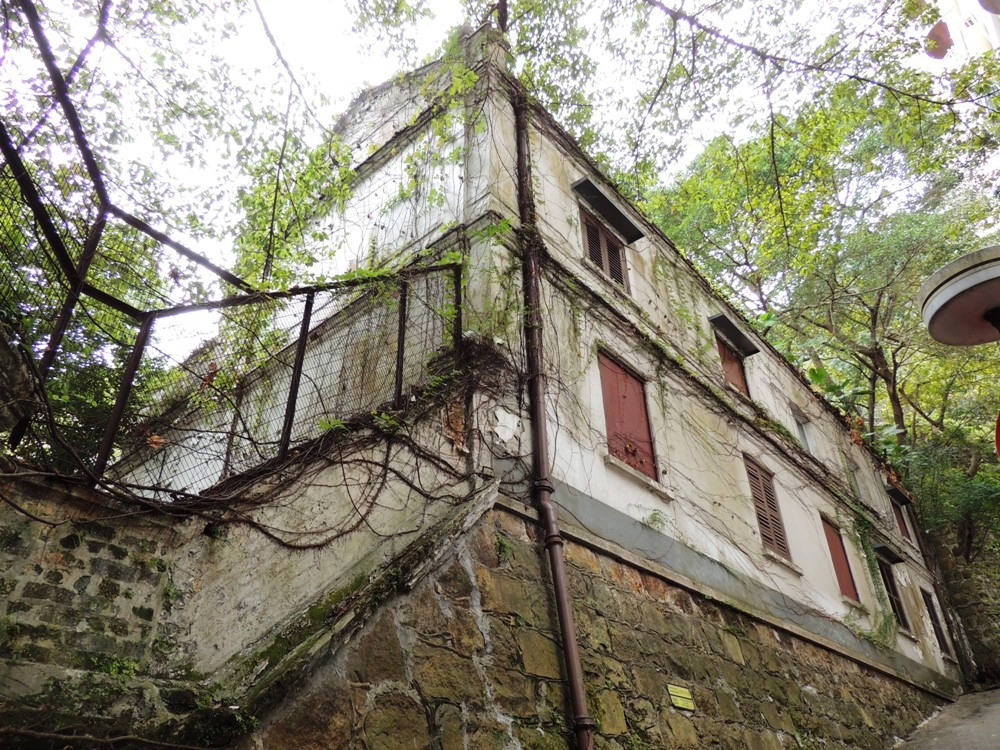
Surviving Gatekeeper's Lodge
