= Zetland Hall =

Masonic buildings in Hong Kong

Coordinates: 22°16′34.88″N 114°09′29.39″E

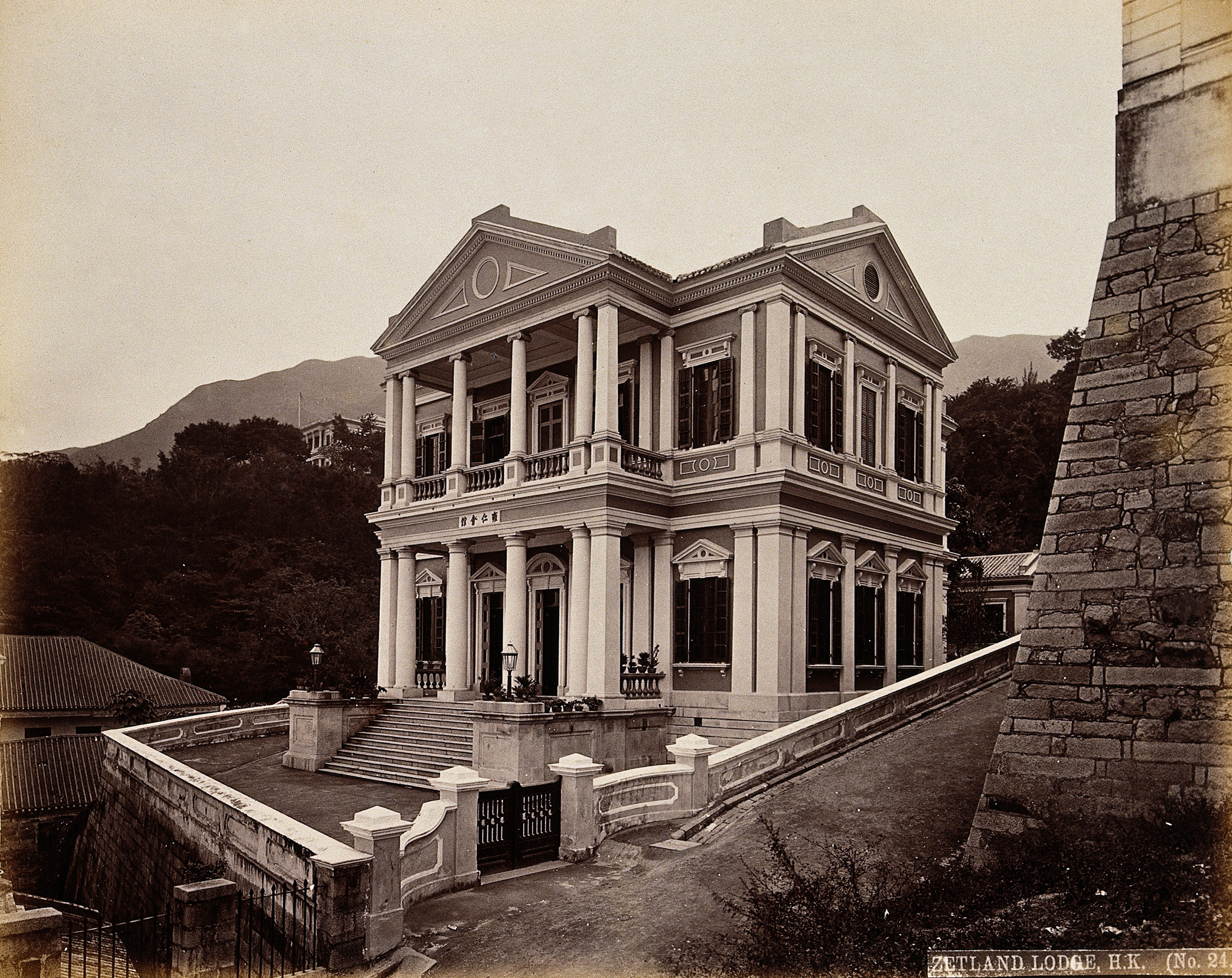
The Second Zetland Hall, Zetland Street, Central, Hong Kong. 19th century photograph by William Pryor Floyd.

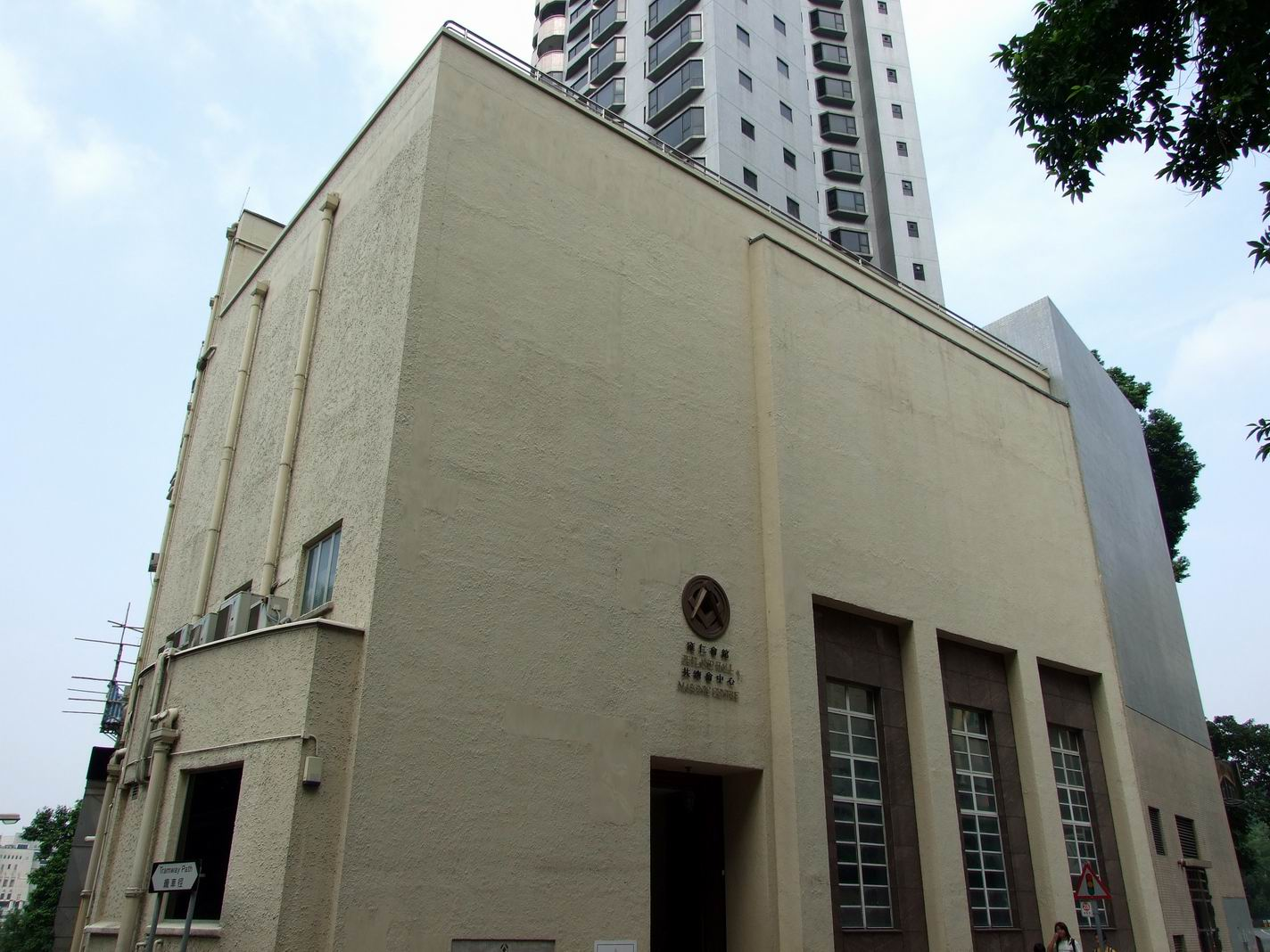
Today's Zetland Hall on Kennedy Road

Zetland Hall (Chinese: 雍仁會館) is the name given to two buildings as Masonic Centre in Hong Kong, one historic, the other modern. Both have housed Masonic Lodges.

Masonic Centre is the headquarters of the Hong Kong Freemasons. In addition to providing member benefits for Freemason lodges in Hong Kong and the Far East, Zetland Hall also hosts visiting Freemasons from other regions passing through Hong Kong.

The Freemasons is a fraternal and charitable organization, characterized by utopian ideals and a sense of mystery, which originated in Medieval Europe and was officially founded in England in 1717. In 1759, the "Prince Carl" ship of the Swedish East India Company carried Freemason members to Guangdong, marking the beginning of Freemasonry’s history in Asia.

The current Zetland Hall is located at 1 Kennedy Road, Mid-Levels, Hong Kong. The building is five stories tall, with four floors above ground and a basement. The basement houses a kitchen and changing rooms, while the ground floor contains a bar and a banquet hall that can accommodate over 120 people. The first and second floors each have two meeting rooms, as well as a small Freemasonry museum and a library with over a thousand Freemasonry books. Unless with special permission or for special occasions, non-members may only enter the ground floor bar and banquet hall.

Members may bring non-members to enjoy the dining service at Zetland Hall. Lunch is available Monday to Friday, breakfast is served on Saturday mornings, and there is a special curry buffet lunch every Friday.

According to Zetland Hall’s internal rules, the minimum dress code for the banquet hall and bar on weekdays is "smart casual", meaning collared shirts and casual trousers are acceptable. Sleeveless shirts, collarless T-shirts, vests, shorts, and flip-flops are not permitted. Hats are not allowed inside Zetland Hall unless for religious, cultural, or ceremonial reasons.

Zetland Hall holds a certificate of compliance under the Societies (Property Safety) Ordinance issued by the Hong Kong Licensing Office. Unless with special permission or for special occasions, the hall only admits visitors and members who are 18 years of age or older. Zetland Hall is also licensed as a club under the Liquor Licensing Board.

According to records from the Hong Kong Land Registry, one-third ownership of Zetland Hall (165,000/500,000 shares) is held by the Trustees of Zetland Hall of the Hong Kong Freemasons, and the remaining two-thirds (335,000/500,000 shares) have been sold to Sun Hung Kai Properties and Walter Kwok.

== The original Zetland Hall - Bungalow ==
The original Zetland Hall, fondly referred to as The Bungalow, was the first meeting hall of the Freemasons in Hong Kong. It was established in the Inland Lot 34.

The second Zetland Hall was built in 1865 and destroyed by an American air raid in 1944, during the Japanese occupation of Hong Kong.

The building was located at the upper junction of Zetland Street and Ice House Street, where a Hong Kong Electric sub-station stands today. The building was designed by the Surveyor-General, Charles St George Cleverly, who also designed Government House. The building took its name from Zetland Lodge No. 525, the Masonic lodge that built it, and that was itself named for Thomas Dundas, 2nd Earl of Zetland, Grand Master of the United Grand Lodge of England from 1844 to 1870.

Zetland Lodge remained in use until the Second World War when it was severely damaged during an air raid.

== Third Zetland Hall ==
In the meeting on 7th July 1947, the Zetland Hall Trustee decided to sell the land of second generation Zetland Hall, i.e. Inland Lot 1875, to Hong Kong Electric & Co. by HK$900,000. In the same meeting, the Trustee decided to buy the Inland Lot 1875, the land which established a Hotel called St. George's House, with the cost HK$125,000.

In May 1949, the land transaction was logged in the Land Registry of Hong Kong Government.

On April 27, 1949, Legislative Council member Hon D. F. Landale proposed, with member Sir Tsun-nin Chau seconding, to amend the 1922 "Zetland Hall Trustees Incorporation Ordinance." The "purposes and reasons" are as follows:

1. Legal Status of Trustees: Under the 1922 "Zetland Hall Trustees Incorporation Ordinance," Zetland Hall trustees were established for the purpose of maintaining the Hong Kong Freemasons’ hall. The original ordinance limited the trustees to representatives of certain lodges, but this excluded lodges operating under the Irish Constitution. The amendment now includes lodges operating under the Irish Constitution among the trustees.
2. Growth of Lodges: Since incorporation, many new Masonic lodges have been established in Hong Kong, including those relocated from foreign concessions in China. These new lodges use the hall maintained by the trustees and contribute financially through fees and rent.
3. Representation Issue: The current limitation on trustees (only representatives of predominantly English lodges as listed in the ordinance) is considered insufficient to represent the broader Masonic community. It is proposed to expand the number of represented lodges and to allow lodges established in the future to have elected representatives within the trust.
4. New Masonic Hall: The original Masonic hall, located at Inland Lot 31, was destroyed during World War II and has since been sold. At the time, Charles Bernard Brown, President of the Hong Kong and South China District Grand Lodge, and Edmund Maurice Raymond, one of Zetland Hall’s trustees, acquired Inland Lot 1875 as representatives of Zetland Hall trustees for the construction of a new Masonic hall, proposing that the property be vested in the trustees.

In 1949, the architectural firm of Leigh & Orange designed new premises for the Lodge at Inland Lot 1875, i.e. 1 Kennedy Road, Mid-Levels. The foundation stone of this Lodge Building was laid on 2nd April 1949 by Right Worshipful Brother Charles Bernard Brown - District Grand Master of English Constitution and Right Worshipful Brother Arthur Anderson Dand Hon. J.G.W. - District Grand Master of Scottish Constitution. This building is also known as Zetland Hall, and has become the headquarters of the District Grand Lodge of Hong Kong and the Far East (which operates as part of the United Grand Lodge of England).

== English Constitution Lodges at Zetland Hall ==
Now, there are 21 (English Constitution) lodges under the District Grand Lodge of Hong Kong and Far East, United Grand Lodge of England and 20 lodges meet at Zetland Hall, Hong Kong and 1 lodge meets at Kobe:

- Cathay Lodge No. 4373
- Corinthian Lodge of Amoy No. 1806
- Diocesan Schools Lodge of Hong Kong No. 10055
- Foochow Lodge No. 1912
- Harriers Lodge No. 9882
- Hong Kong and Far East District Grand Stewards Lodge No. 9879
- Lodge of Lu Pan No. 9387
- Lodge Star of Southern China No. 2013
- Paul Chater Lodge of Installed Masters No. 5391
- Perseverance Lodge of Hong Kong No. 1165
- Rising Sun Lodge No. 1401 (Meeting at Kobe, Japan)
- Rotarian Lodge of Hong Kong No. 9378
- Royal Sussex Lodge No. 501
- St. Paul's Lodge No. 9718
- St Joseph’s & La Salle No. 10050
- Swatow Lodge No. 3705
- The Club Lodge No. 9880
- United Service Lodge No. 1341
- University Lodge of Hong Kong No. 3666
- Victoria Lodge of Hong Kong No. 1026
- Zetland Lodge No. 525

== Irish Constitution Lodges at Zetland Hall ==
Now, there are 7 (Irish Constitution) lodges under the Provincial Grand Lodge of the Far East, Grand Lodge of Ireland:

- Arthur Gomes Lodge of Installed Master No.1001
- Baden Powell Lodge No. 929
- Emerald Lodge of Hong Kong No. 883
- Lodge Erin No. 463
- Lodge St. David No. 903
- Shamrock Lodge No. 712
- Sino Lusitano Lodge of Macau No. 897

== Scottish Constitution Lodges at Zetland Hall ==
Now, there are 12 (Scottish Constitution) lodges under the District Grand Lodge of the Far East, Grand Lodge of Scotland and 6 lodges meet at Zetland Hall, Hong Kong and 6 lodges meet elsewhere:

- Cosmopolitan No. 428
- Eastern Scotia No. 923
- Han Yang No. 1048 (Seoul, Korea)
- Harry S. Truman No. 1727 (Gyeonggi-Do, Korea)
- Hiogo and Osaka No. 498 (Kobe, Japan)
- Naval & Military No. 848
- Perla Del Oriente No. 1034 (Manila, the Philippines)
- Pusan Korea Lodge No. 1675 (Pusan, Korea)
- St. Andrew in the Far East No. 493
- St. John No. 618
- Star in the East No. 640 (Yokohama, Japan)
- Trident No. 1849

In addition to the aforementioned lodges, the Hong Kong Freemasons also have various organizations and funds under their banner:

- Zetland Hall Trustees Incorporation
- Chater Masonic Scholarship Fund
- Hong Kong and Far East Masonic Benevolence Fund
- One Kennedy Club (1KC), which organizes various activities for new and young Freemason members as well as prospective members

Several lodges also have their own charitable funds, relief funds, and scholarships.

== New Lodges after 20 years ==
On June 6, 2024, the Hong Kong and Far East District Grand Lodge welcomed the establishment of its first new lodge in 20 years. The newly established lodge is called St. Joseph’s & La Salle Lodge, with lodge number No. 10050, and it is also the first lodge in the region to have a number exceeding 10,000. The members of this lodge are mainly alumni, parents, or other stakeholders of the secondary and primary schools founded by the La Salle Brothers in Hong Kong. Schools established by the La Salle Brothers in Hong Kong include St. Joseph’s College (1875), La Salle College (1932), La Salle Primary School (1957), New Territories La Salle Secondary School (1965), St. Joseph’s Primary School (1968), Chan Sui Ki (La Salle) College (1969), Cheung Chuk Shan College (1971), and Chan Sui Ki (La Salle) Primary School (1973).

Subsequently, on January 18, 2025, the Hong Kong and Far East District Grand Lodge again welcomed another new lodge — the Diocesan Schools Lodge of Hong Kong, with lodge number No. 10055. This is also the second lodge in the region with a number exceeding 10,000. The members of this lodge, like those of St. Paul's Lodge No. 9718 (established in 2000), are mainly alumni, parents, or other stakeholders of schools established by the Anglican Church in Hong Kong’s three main dioceses — that is, St. Paul’s College, St. Paul’s Co-educational College, Diocesan Boys’ School, and other secondary and primary schools under the Anglican Church.

== Stained Glass Windows ==
During the restoration of Béthanie (the Bethanie Chapel) by the Hong Kong Academy for Performing Arts, it was discovered that all 19 of the original stained glass windows of the chapel had been lost. The project director, Philip Soden, visited many churches and eventually found seven stained glass windows in Zetland Hall; their shape and size were identical to those required by the Béthanie chapel.

Upon investigation, it turned out that in 1985, an architect discovered a batch of stained glass windows near Béthanie, at Chi Fu Fa Yuen. Since the windows were quite old, they were stored in a government warehouse. In 1998, when that architect was renovating Zetland Hall for its 50th anniversary, the dining hall required stained glass, so he applied to the government to use seven of the stored windows. The remaining two windows continued to be stored by the government. After reviewing three photographs of Béthanie from the 1950s and 1960s, it was finally confirmed that the stained glass windows in Zetland Hall and those in the government warehouse all originated from Béthanie.

Subsequently, the Academy and the Freemasons discussed the feasibility of returning the Zetland Hall windows to Béthanie. Fortunately, Bruce Humphrey, then chairman of the Zetland Hall Trustee, along with the Trustees, supported the restoration of Béthanie’s original condition and generously returned the seven stained glass windows. The two windows stored by the government were also given back to the chapel. Among these nine windows is the central Sacred Heart motif window located above the main altar in the chapel. The Academy recreated the other ten stained glass windows according to the original design. Now, all 19 windows have been restored to Béthanie chapel.
