= Pierre (restaurant) =

Coordinates: 22.2819°N 114.1595°E

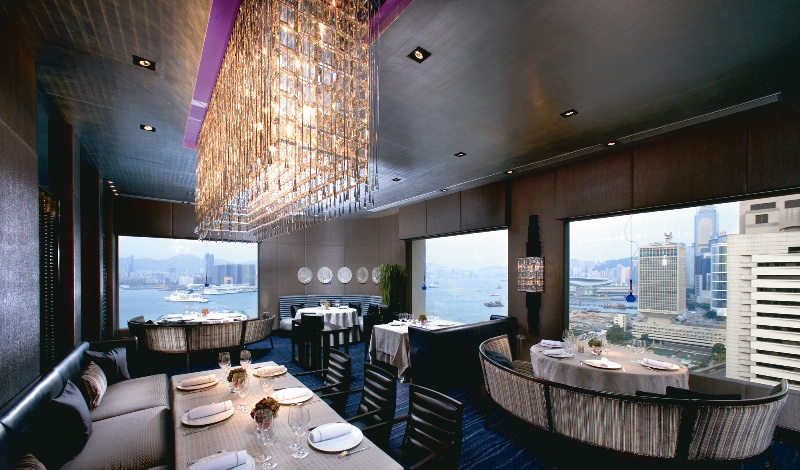
- Interactive map of Pierre

Restaurant information
- Established: October 2006; 19 years ago
- Closed: 31 July 2020; 5 years ago
- Food type: French cuisine.
- Dress code: Smart casual
- Rating: Michelin Guide Hong Kong & Macau
- Location: 25/F, Mandarin Oriental Hotel, Central, Hong Kong, China
- Other locations: Paris, Tokyo, London
- Website: Pierre

Pierre is a closed French cuisine restaurant which was situated on the 25th floor of the Mandarin Oriental hotel in Hong Kong. It opened in October 2006 after a major renovation to the hotel and was Pierre Gagnaire’s pied-à-terre in Hong Kong. It replaced Vong's (1997–2005), which replaced Pierrot (1979–1997), a classic French restaurant. After 14 years in service, Pierre closed on 31 July 2020.

== Accolades ==
The restaurant received two star in the Michelin Guide's Hong Kong and Macau edition.
