= Pierre (disambiguation) =

Pierre is a French given name.

Pierre may also refer to:

== Places ==
- Pierre, South Dakota, the capital of South Dakota
- Rivière à Pierre (Batiscan River tributary), in Portneuf Regional County Municipality, Quebec, Canada
- Pierre River (Mitchinamecus River tributary), in Baie-Obaoca, Quebec, Canada

=== Facilities and structures ===
- Pierre University, a former university in Pierre, SD, that moved to Huron, SD, and was renamed
- Pierre (restaurant), a restaurant in the Mandarin Oriental Hotel in Hong Kong
- The Pierre, a luxury hotel in New York City

== Literature ==
- Pierre; or, The Ambiguities, a novel by Herman Melville
- Pierre (A Cautionary Tale), a children's story by Maurice Sendak

== Other uses ==
- Pierre (penguin) (1983–2016), an African penguin at the California Academy of Sciences in San Francisco
- "Pierre" (song), a 2015 song by Ryn Weaver
- Pierre, a 1985 animated film by John R. Dilworth
- Yhonzae Pierre (born 2004), American football player
- Pierre (TV series), a 2026 British television series

== See also ==
- Pier (disambiguation)
- Saint-Pierre (disambiguation)
