= Mandarin Oriental, Hong Kong =

Hotel in Central, Hong Kong

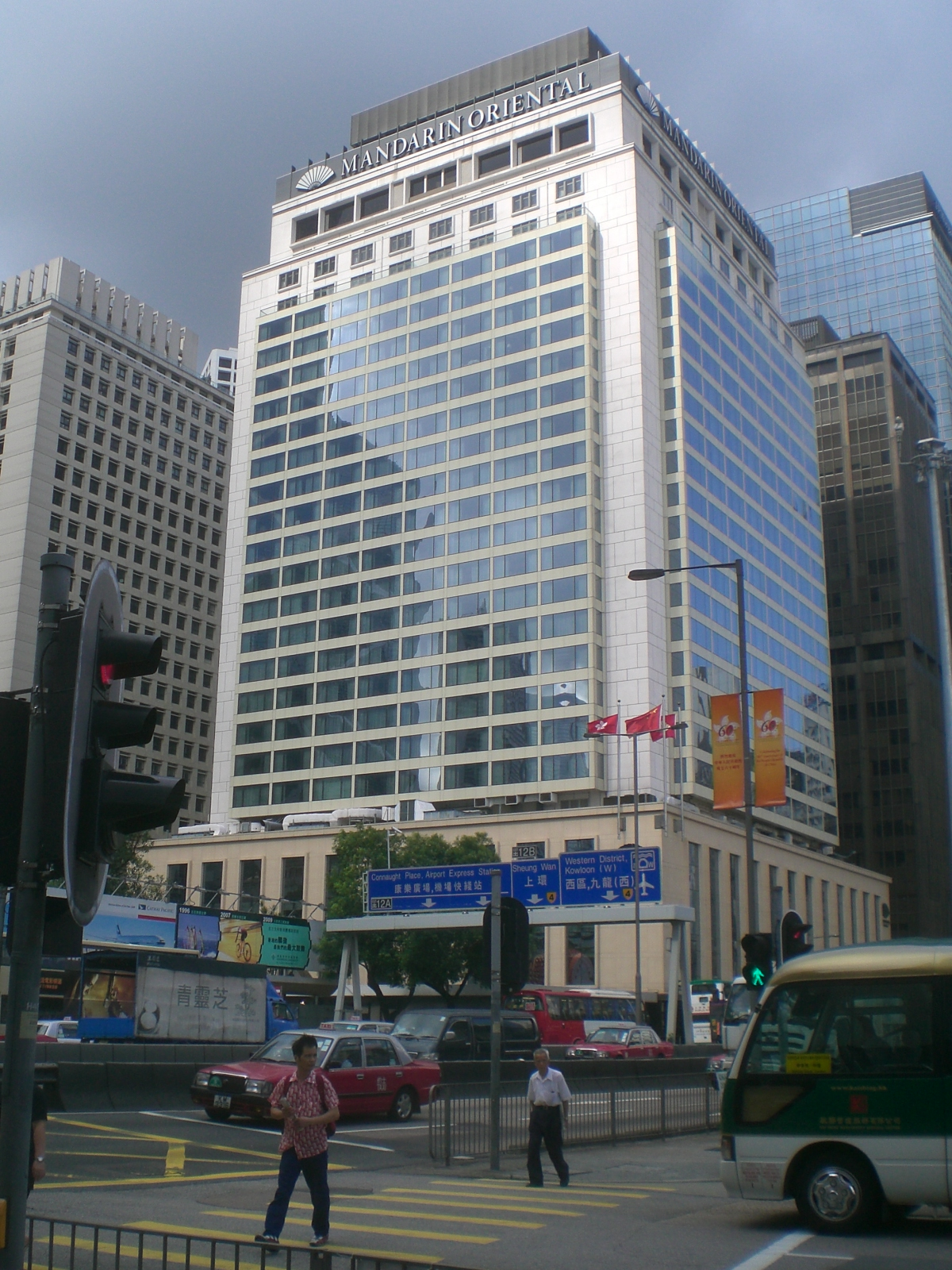

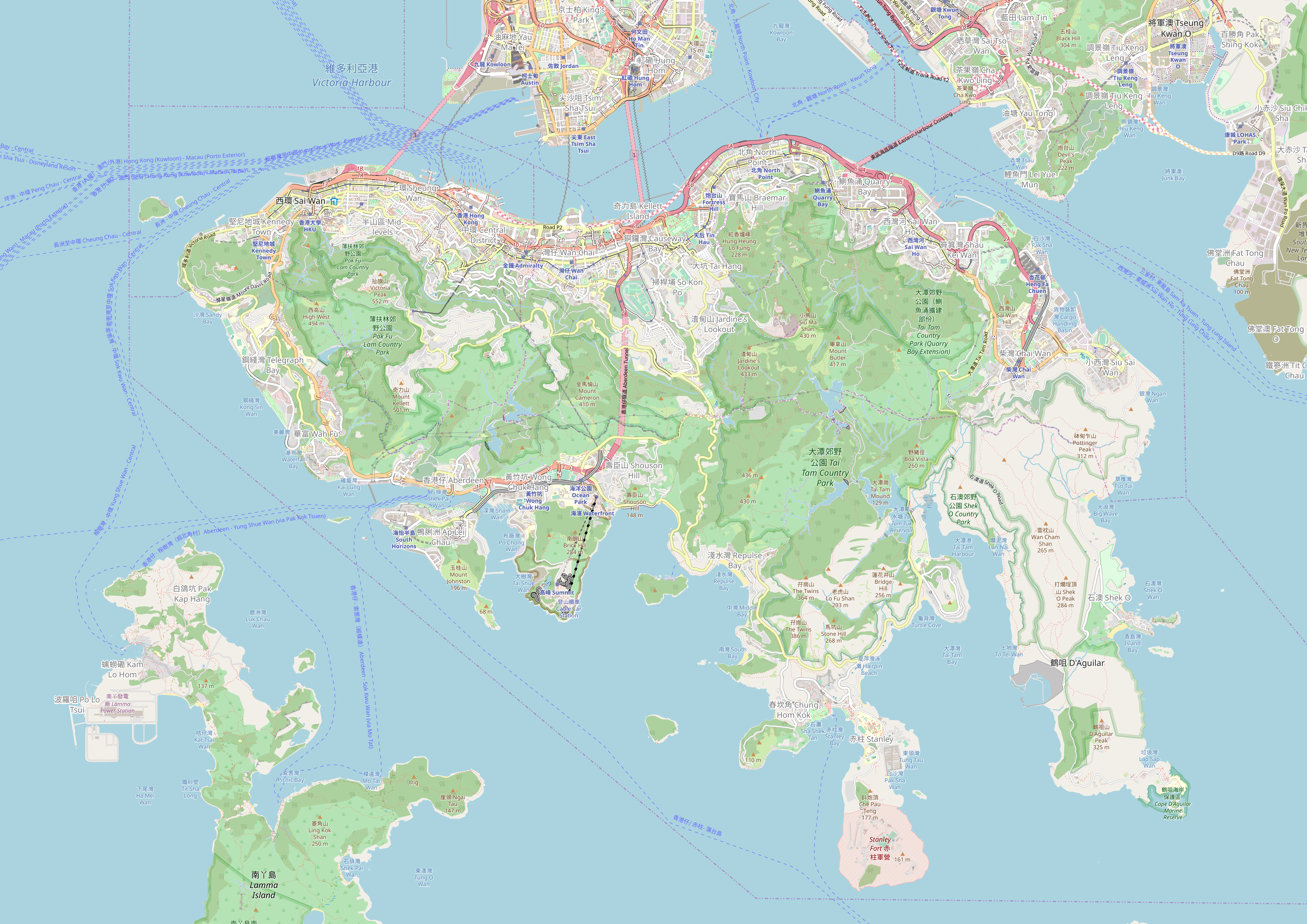
- Location on Hong Kong Island

General information
- Location: 5 Connaught Road Central, Central, Hong Kong
- Coordinates: 22°16′53″N 114°9′27″E
- Opening: 24 October 1963; 62 years ago, reopened in 2006 after a complete renovation
- Owner: Mandarin Oriental Hotel Group
- Operator: Mandarin Oriental Hotel Group

Technical details
- Floor count: 25

Design and construction
- Architects: John Howarth, Leigh & Orange
- Developer: City Hotels Limited

Other information
- Number of rooms: 447
- Number of suites: 67
- Number of restaurants: 10

Website
- Mandarin Oriental, Hong Kong

Mandarin Oriental, Hong Kong
- Traditional Chinese: 香港文華東方酒店
- Simplified Chinese: 香港文华东方酒店
Transcriptions
Standard Mandarin
- Hanyu Pinyin: Xiānggǎng Wénhuá Dōngfāng Jiǔdiàn
Yue: Cantonese
- Yale Romanization: Hēung góng màhn wàah dūng fōng jáu dim
- Jyutping: Hoeng1 gong2 man4 waa4 dung1 fong1 zau2 dim3

The Mandarin Oriental, Hong Kong is a five-star hotel on Connaught Road Central in Central, Hong Kong, owned and managed by Mandarin Oriental Hotel Group.

== History ==
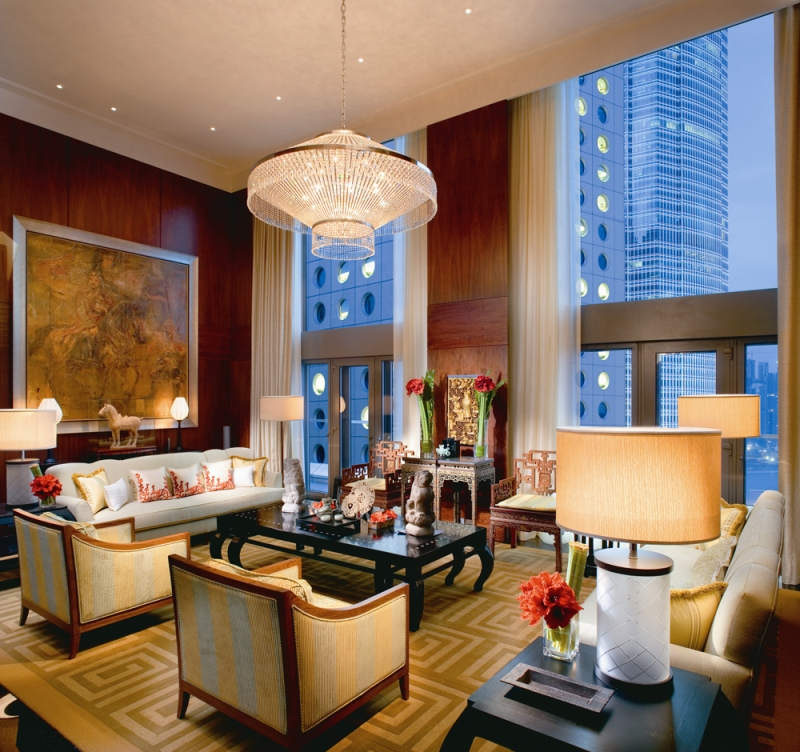
Mandarin Suite living room at Mandarin Oriental, Hong Kong

Construction of the hotel on the site of the colonial Queen's Building on the waterfront in Central Hong Kong was announced on 9 July 1960, with the name Queen's Hotel. On 24 August 1962, the South China Morning Post reported that the unfinished hotel's name had been changed to The Mandarin, because "a nationwide survey of the United States seeking American reaction to the hotel name shows that the American public, who comprised the majority of this Colony’s tourists, preferred the exotic-sounding Mandarin." The topping off ceremony was held on 28 March 1963. The cost of construction was HK$42 million, and HK$66 million was spent on interior decoration. John Howarth, of the Leigh & Orange architectural firm, designed the building, while the interior was designed by Don Ashton.

The Mandarin opened to the public on 1 September 1963 and celebrated its grand opening on 24 October 1963. The hotel was managed by Intercontinental Hotels from its opening until 1974. At 26 storeys, it was the tallest building in Hong Kong. It was the first hotel in Hong Kong to have direct dial phones and the first in Asia to include a bath in every guestroom. The Mandarin was originally adjacent to Victoria Harbour, but as a result of extensive land reclamation in the waterfront area, the harbour is now several blocks away. In 1988, it was renamed the Mandarin Oriental. In 2003, the hotel was the site of the suicide of singer Leslie Cheung, who jumped from the 24th storey of the building. In 2005, the hotel underwent a US$150 million renovation.

== Facilities ==
The hotel contains 501 guestrooms, 67 of which are suites, overlooking Victoria Harbour. There are ten restaurants and bars. The Michelin-starred Pierre, Chef Pierre Gagnaire's first restaurant in Hong Kong, closed in 2020. An event space can accommodate up to 600 people.

== See also ==
- Mandarin Oriental Hotel Group
- List of tallest buildings in Hong Kong
