= Julie Wolkenstein =

French writer (born 1968)

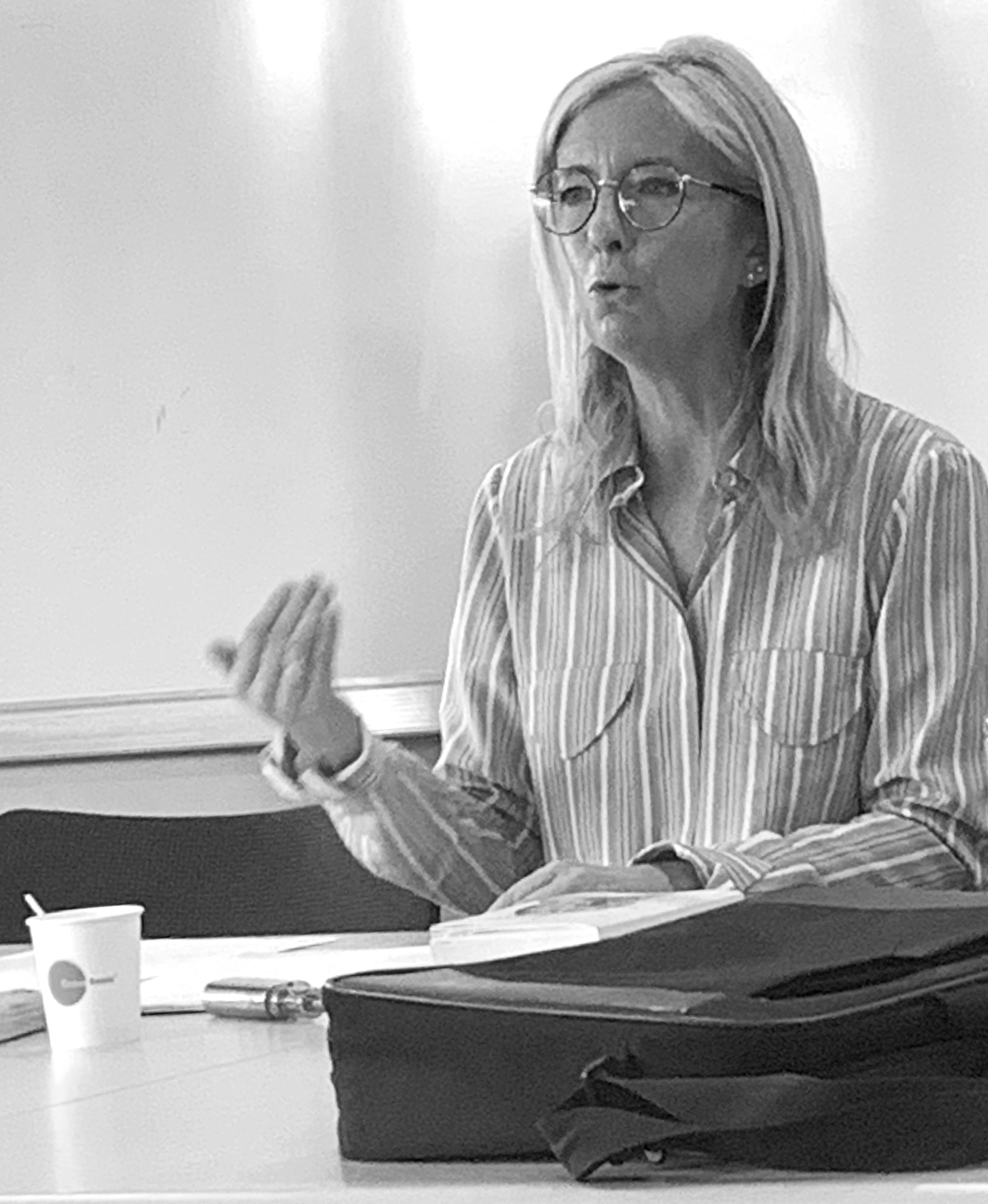
- Julie Wolkenstein in 2019
- Born: Julie Poirot-Delpech; 1968 (age 57–58); Paris, France
- Occupations: Writer and professor of comparative literature at the University of Caen
- Notable work: Adèle et moi; L’Excuse

Julie Wolkenstein (née Julie Poirot-Delpech, French: [ʒyli pwaʁo dɛlpɛʃ]) is a French writer born in 1968 in Paris. She is the daughter of academician Bertrand Poirot-Delpech and, by her mother, the granddaughter of French industrialist Maurice Jordan.

A professor of comparative literature at the University of Caen, she wrote a thesis on Henry James.

== Works ==
=== Novels ===
- 1999: Juliette ou la paresseuse, Paris, P.O.L., 262 p. ISBN 2-86744-669-4
- 2000: L’Heure anglaise, Paris, P.O.L., 189 p. ISBN 2-86744-741-0
- 2001: Colloque sentimental, Paris, P.O.L., 344p. ISBN 2-86744-843-3
- 2004: Happy end, Paris, P.O.L., 199 p. ISBN 2-84682-050-3
- 2008: L’Excuse, Paris, P.O.L., 344 p. ISBN 978-2-84682-271-8
- 2013: Adèle et moi, Paris, P.O.L., 600 p. ISBN 978-2-8180-1737-1
- 2015: Le Mystère du tapis d'Ardabil, Paris, P.O.L, 384 p. ISBN 978-2-8180-3776-8
- 2017: Les Vacances, Paris, P.O.L, 368 p. ISBN 978-2-8180-4266-3
- 2020: Et toujours en été, Paris, P.O.L, 224 p. ISBN 978-2-8180-4967-9

=== Essays, translations ===
- 2000: La Scène européenne : Henry James et le romanesque en question, Paris, Éditions Honoré Champion, coll. « Bibliothèque de littérature générale et comparée », 359 p. ISBN 2-7453-0249-3
- 2006: Les Récits de rêves dans la fiction, Paris, Éditions Klincksieck, 171 p. ISBN 2-252-03584-6
- 2011: Francis Scott Fitzgerald, translation by Julie Wolkenstein, The Great Gatsby, under the title Gatsby, Paris, P.O.L, 278 p. ISBN 978-2-8180-1286-4
