= Bertrand Poirot-Delpech =

French journalist, essayist and novelist

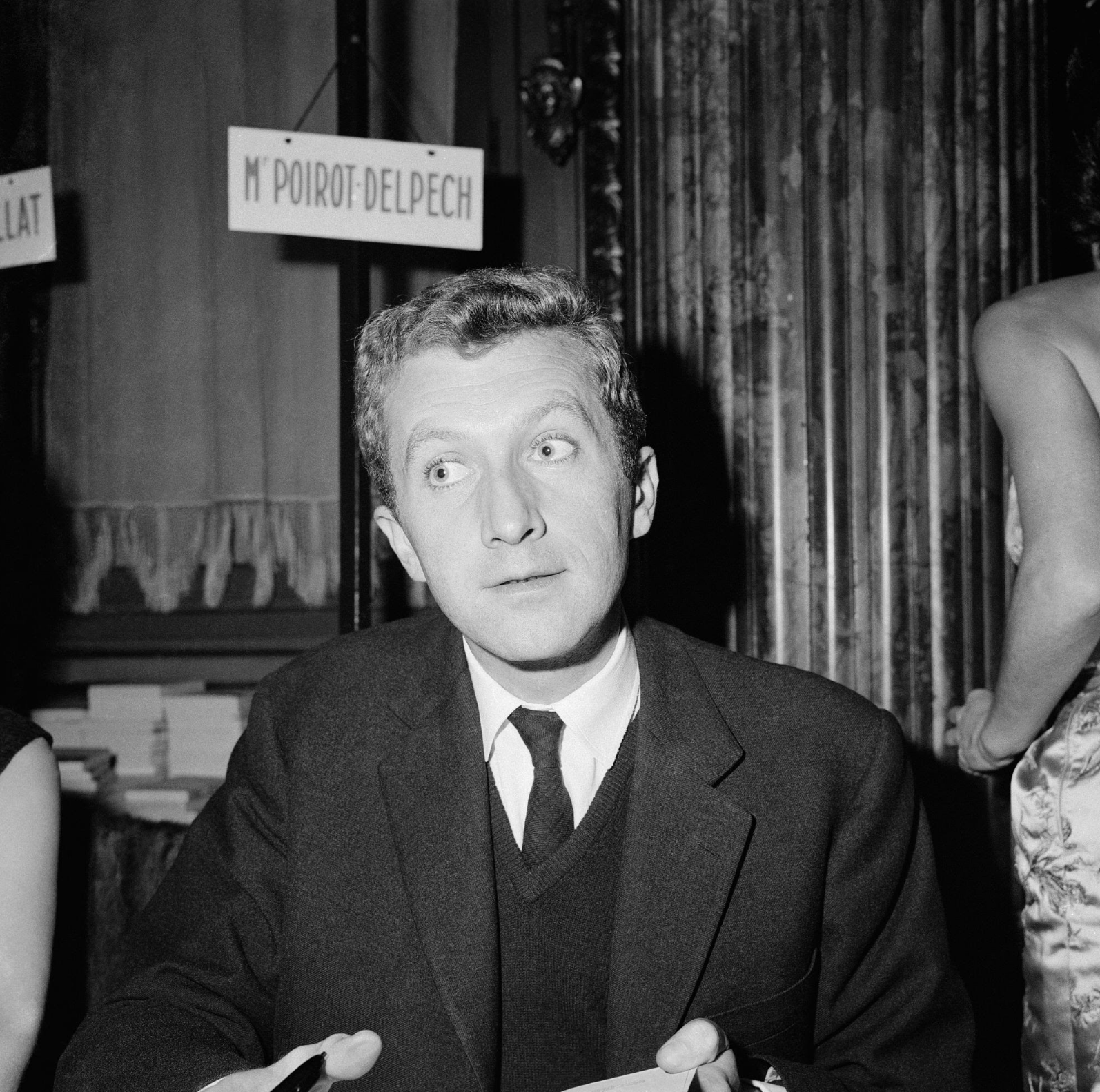

Bertrand Poirot-Delpech (French: [bɛʁtʁɑ̃ pwaʁo dɛlpɛʃ]; 10 February 1929, Paris – 14 November 2006) was a French journalist, essayist and novelist. He was elected to the Académie française on 10 April 1986. He is the father of writer Julie Wolkenstein.

== Early years ==
Poirot-Delpech came from a family of academics and doctors. His ancestors included several surgeons. His father died in 1940.

He attended Stanislas and Louis-le-Grand secondary schools, completing his khâgne at the latter.

== Career ==
At the age of 22, he began his career as a journalist with Le Monde. He successively had charge of several sections: the university column (1951–1955), the "Great Trials" column (1956–1959) and the theatre criticism section (1960–1971). In 1972, he took over as a reviewer for the "Monde des Livres". Beginning in 1989, he wrote a weekly column in Le Monde.

Bertrand Poirot-Delpech chaired the Syndicat de la Critique Dramatique (1970–1972) and he was a member of the reading committee of the Comédie-Française.

In addition to several published novels, he wrote screenplays for television and the cinema.

== Bibliography ==
- 1958 Le Grand Dadais (Denoël)
- 1960 La Grasse Matinée (Denoël)
- 1962 L'Envers de l'eau (Denoël)
- 1966 Au soir le soir (Mercure de France)
- 1969 Finie la comédie (Gallimard)
- 1970 La Folle de Lituanie (Gallimard) - Grand Prix du roman de l'Académie française
- 1973 Les Grands de ce monde (Gallimard)
- 1976 La Légende du siècle (Gallimard)
- 1979 Saïd et moi (Le Seuil)
- 1980 Marie Duplessis (Ramsay)
- 1981 Feuilletons (Gallimard)
- 1982 Le Couloir du dancing (Gallimard)
- 1985 L'Été 36 (Gallimard)
- 1986 Bonjour Sagan (Herscher)
- 1987 Monsieur Barbie n'a rien à dire (Gallimard)
- 1988 Le Golfe de Gascogne (Gallimard)
- 1989 Traversées (Flammarion)
- 1994 L'Amour de l'humanité (Gallimard)
- 1995 Diagonales (Gallimard)
- 1997 L'Alerte, théâtre (Gallimard)
- 1998 Théâtre d'ombres, journal (Le Seuil)
- 1998 Papon : un crime de bureau (Stock)
- 1999 Monsieur le Prince (Gallimard)
- 2001 J'écris Paludes (Gallimard)
- 2002 J'ai pas pleuré, with Ida Grinspan (Robert Laffont)
