= Shoe shiners in Hong Kong =

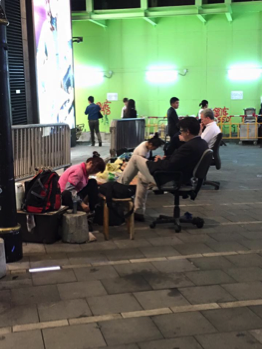
Shoe shiners working in Theatre Lane

Shoe shiners in Hong Kong are people who polish shoes on the street in Hong Kong for a living, mainly clustering on the pavement in Central, especially in Theatre Lane (also known as "shoe-polishers’ lane").

They usually sit on a tiny plastic chair with a small wooden block placed in front at arm’s length as a shoe-holder. The shoe-shining kit consists mostly of paste tins, sponge daubers, some shine cloths, shoe horns and shoe shine brushes. The white-collar workers in the financial district are the main customers for shoe shiners in Hong Kong. They stand, or sit if there is a chair provided, facing the shoe shiner with one leg up on the wooden block, waiting patiently for the polishing to be done. Shoe shiners spend approximately 10 minutes buffing each pair of shoes. One can at most, polish over 20 pairs in nice weather day. They charge HK$40 for one pair with tips occasionally. As of 2015, the shoe shiners in Hong Kong are mostly aged 60 or above. It is now considered a fading profession in Hong Kong, which has made the shoe shining industry one of the sunset industries in Hong Kong.

== History ==
=== 19th century: origin of shoe shining industry in Hong Kong ===
Shoe shining first started to rise in the United States, which was the African American men who performed the service for the wealthy white men. Started from the late 19th century, the shoeshine services sprung up in Hong Kong. From the post-war period to the colonial period, the earliest gangs of shoe shiners were proclaimed as “Chat Hi Siu Gwai Dui” (Shoe Shine Busters 擦鞋小鬼隊). A band of seven elderly men clustered in Theatre Lane just across Lan Kwai Fong, cleaning shoes of office executives. Key cutters and cobblers operate out of bright green tin stalls are the tools they need for buffing shoes. One local story about the Hong Kong Shoe Shine Busters goes like this: there was an American soldier who refused to have a shoe shining service, the shoe shiner then poured whitener all over his boots before disappearing into a nearby alley. Seeing his boots being ruined with specks of whitener, the soldier had no choice but to pay for the shoe shining service.

=== 20th century: unlicensed shoe shining business ===
Shoes shining business was seen as a shrinking business in the eye of the Urban Council (since merged into the Food and Environmental Hygiene Department (FEHD)). Therefore, since the early 1970s, the department refused to issue licenses to the shoes-polishers under normal circumstances. Renewing license was ceased as shoe shining was a dwindling trade in 2004. As a result of natural attrition, the number of licensed fixed pitch bootblack hawker decreases in Hong Kong.

However, even with the risk of being fined by the FEHD officials, many shoes shiners continued their business, especially in the area around the Central's Theatre Lane, where other traditional craftsmen set their station alongside the Pedder Building.

In those days, FEHD officials caught and fined the polishers up to $1,500 nearly every day, while the owners of shops nearby also drove them away.

=== 2009: legalisation of part of shoes shining industry ===
FEHD came down hard on the unlicensed shoe shiners by regularly issuing them with fines and confiscating their tools.

A shoe polisher who identified himself as Mr. Lee was prosecuted for operating without a license and causing public obstruction with his stall on the side of the street. The dispute between Mr. Lee and the officials made the news and has aroused much public support for the polishers. The issue moved a Civic Party legislator, Audrey Eu, to campaign on behalf of Mr. Lee and four more polishers, aiming to fight for licenses. After a series of lobbying and publicity stunts, her effort paid off with a discussion with the Central and Western District Council and local shop owners. In June, shoe shiners finally met the health inspector to discuss the possibility of issuing licenses.

On July 16, after the district council meeting, FEHD, for the first time, issued licenses to shoe polishers in Central, Admiralty and Western Districts. Shoe shiners receiving licences included one who operates at the portion of the footbridge in front of the east entrance of the Murray Road Multi-storey Carpark Building at Lambeth Walk, three at the portion of the southern side of the road space of the unnamed lane connecting Pedder Street and Theatre Lane, and four on the road space in front of House Nos. 1-7 Theatre Lane. Each license costs HK$2,500 per year.

== Present day ==
Other than those eight licensed shoes polishers, there are still many unlicensed polishers scattered across Hong Kong. Women have also started to engage in this occupation. These women mostly carry on their past husband's work, and they now earn around HK$8,000 a month.

== Difficulties ==
Hawker Control Team staff who tackle unlicensed hawking activities always have disputes with the unlicensed bootblack hawkers. Shoe polishers were caught by officials of FEHD. Due to cultural significance of as well as rising public awareness about shoe shiners, FEHD agreed to issue fixed pitch hawkers licenses to eight bootblack hawkers, who had engaged in the business for many years. However, other than those shoe shiners, the remaining hawkers still are not allowed to renew their licenses. Therefore, there are always conflicts between unlicensed bootblack hawkers about where to locate their hawker stalls.

== Future ==
Most of the polishers are old and some are unable to work due to health problems. Some of the polishers continues to serve the people because they still have to make ends meet. Due to the a low monthly income, young people are less willing to join such business. More shoes stores located in shopping centres provide high-quality shoe shining services. Hence, the competitiveness of shoe shiners decreases.

== See also ==
- Hawkers in Hong Kong
- Shoe polish
- Sunset industry
