= Chater House =

Building in Hong Kong

- Chinese: 遮打大廈
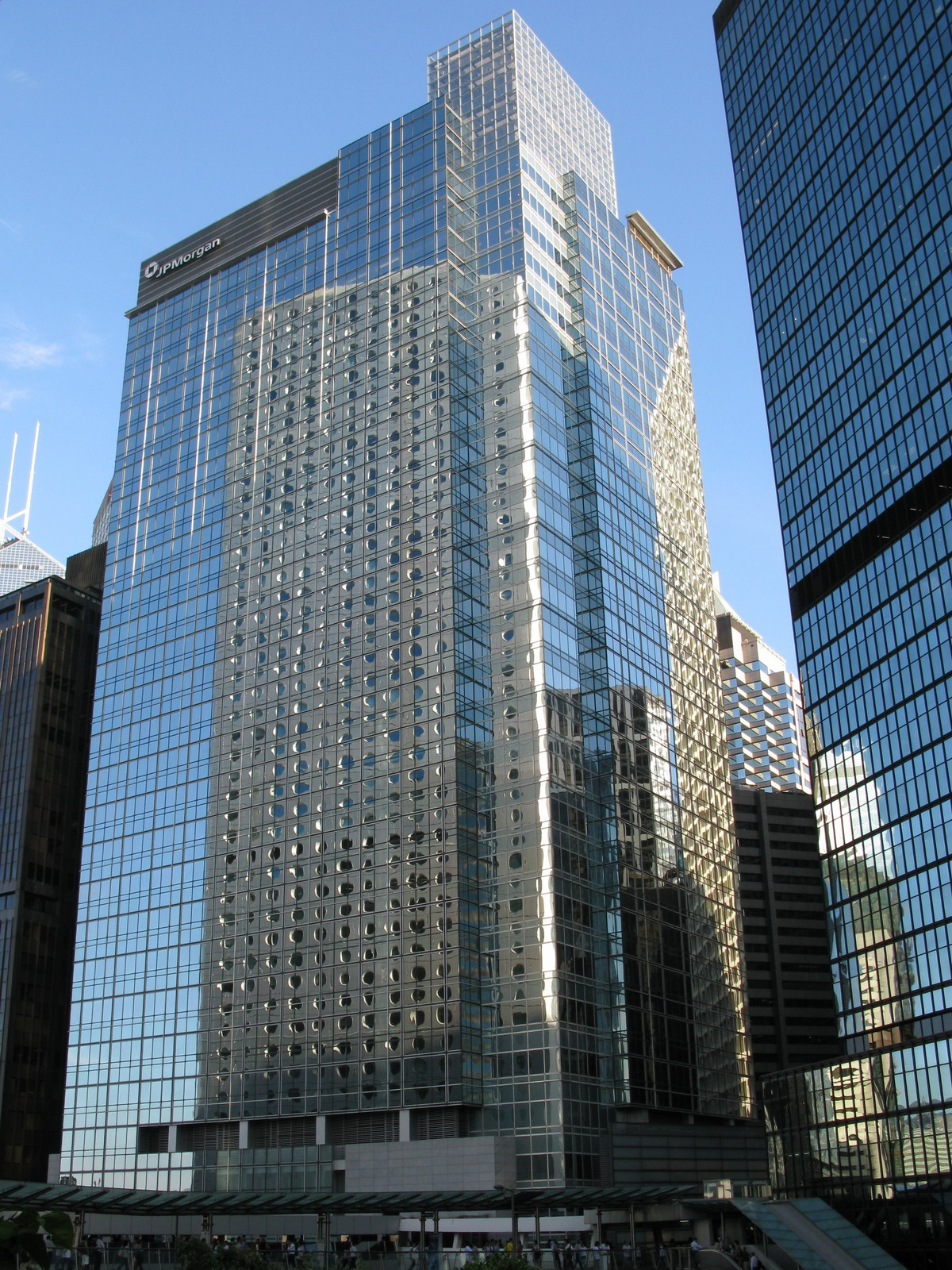
- Chater House viewed from Connaught Road Central
- Interactive map of the Chater House area

General information
- Status: Completed
- Type: shopping mall, office building
- Location: 7-9 Connaught Road Central, 10-12 Chater Road, Central, Hong Kong
- Coordinates: 22°16′56.01″N 114°9′30.24″E
- Construction started: October 1998; 27 years ago
- Opening: March 2003; 23 years ago
- Cost: HK$2.3 billion
- Owner: Hongkong Land

Technical details
- Floor count: 30
- Floor area: 438,500 net sq.ft. (498,000 sq ft. gfa)
- Lifts/elevators: 16 passenger, 2 service

Design and construction
- Architect: Kohn Pedersen Fox
- Developer: Hongkong Land
- Main contractor: Gammon Construction

Chater House
- Traditional Chinese: 遮打大廈
- Simplified Chinese: 遮打大厦
Transcriptions
Standard Mandarin
- Hanyu Pinyin: Zhēdá Dàshà
Yue: Cantonese
- Jyutping: ze1 daa2 daai6 haa6

Chater House (Chinese: 遮打大廈; Jyutping: ze1 daa2 daai6 haa6) is an office tower in Central, Hong Kong. Opened in March 2003, it is a part of the Hongkong Land portfolio of properties. It has a three-level retail podium, known as Landmark Chater. The building was built on the site of the former Swire House, and was named after Sir Paul Chater. The building faces streets on three sides: Chater Road, Pedder Street and Connaught Road Central.

== Plot history ==
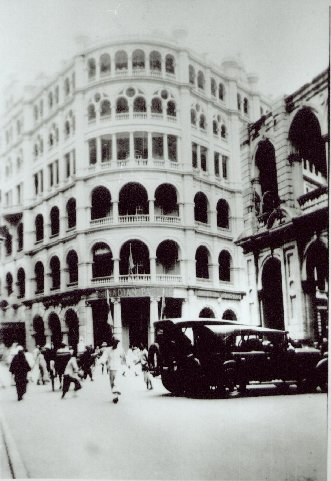
Union Building viewed from Pedder Street, looking north, c.1926. A corner of the burnt down Hong Kong Hotel is visible on the right.

There were three buildings on the site between 1905 and 1958, namely Mansions Building (Hotel Mansions, later renamed Union Building), King's Building and York Building.

=== Union Building ===
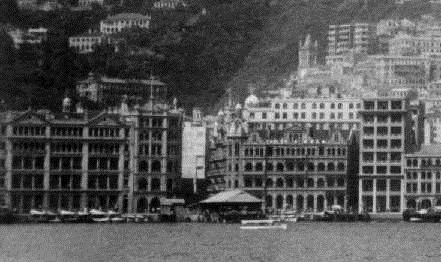
View from Victoria Harbour in the 1920s. The building on the left is King's Building, and the adjacent, slightly taller one is Union Building.

Following the Praya reclamation of 1890–1904, a building was constructed and opened in 1905, that served as offices of Canadian Pacific Ocean Services (G/F) and Hong Kong, Canton & Macao Steamboat Company (1/F).

This building was acquired in 1921, and used as its headquarters by the Union Insurance Society of Canton Ltd., and then became known as Union Building (於仁行).

It was bought by The Hongkong Land Company in 1946, and was demolished in 1950. Hongkong Land later acquired the adjacent King's Building and demolished it in 1958 to complete the Union House complex.

=== King's Building ===
King's Building was built in 1905 and was for some time home to Marconi Wireless. The building was located along Connaught Road, next to the Union Building. It was demolished in 1958.

=== York Building ===
York Building was built in 1905 and demolished in 1958.

=== Swire House ===
The 23-storey building, initially called Union House (於仁大廈; 於仁大厦; jyu1 jan4 daai6 haa6; Yūrén Dàshà), was completed in 1962, and had a total floor space of 34,000 square metres (370,000 sq ft). in the 1970s, the Swire Group, gained naming rights for the building, which was renamed Swire House (太古大廈; 太古大厦; taai3 gu2 daai6 haa6; Tàigǔ Dàshà) in 1976. In 1997, the main tenant of the building was Cathay Pacific, which occupied about 30% of the floor space. Other tenants included other Swire group companies, including Swire Pacific and Swire Industries. Swire House was demolished on 5 October 1998.

=== Chater House ===
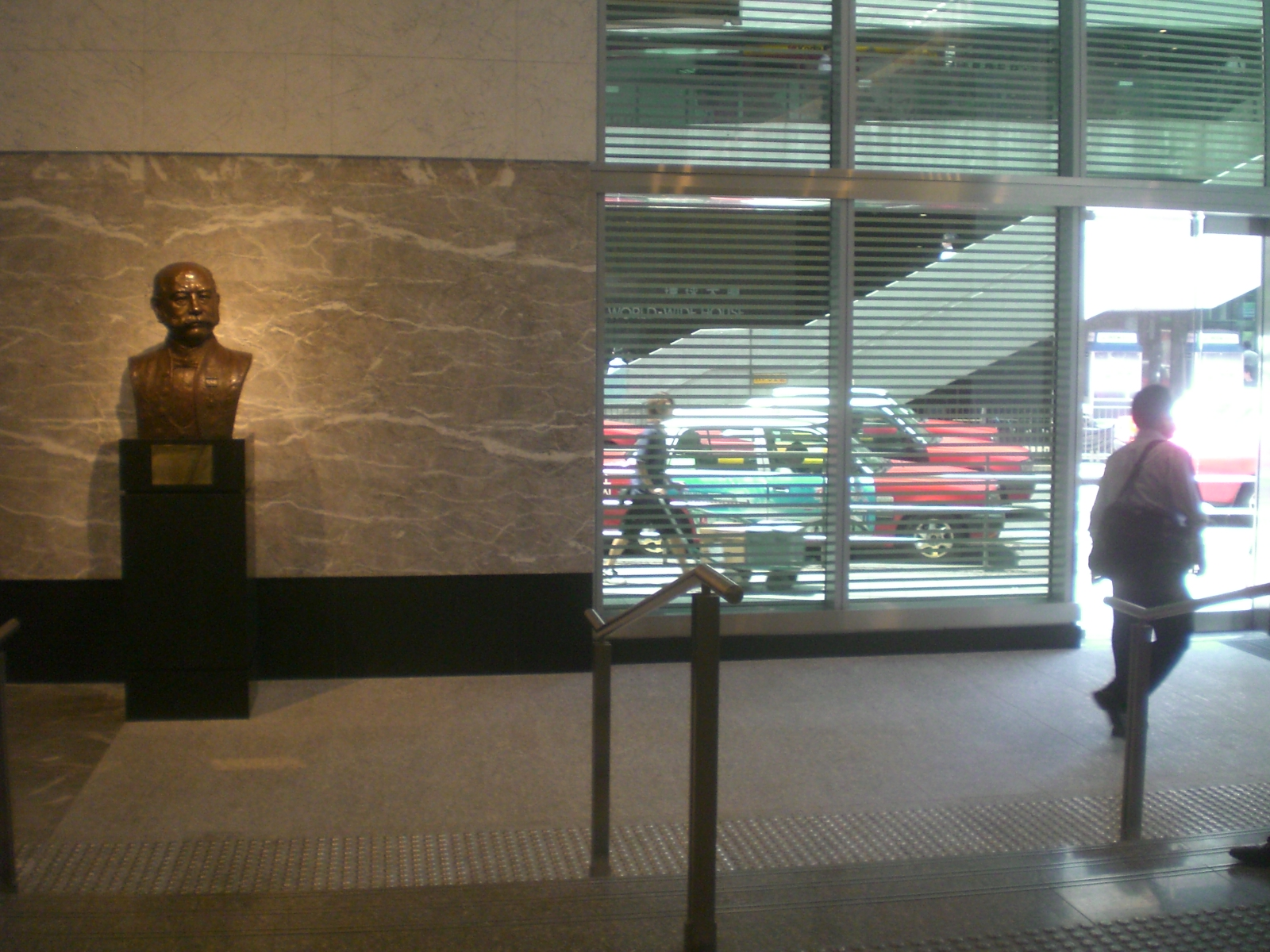
Foyer of Chater House, Hong Kong, with bust of Sir Paul Chater.

The site was again redeveloped by Hongkong Land when the new Hong Kong International Airport opened in 1998. The building's main tenant, Cathay Pacific, relocated to Cathay City when the airport moved to its new site at Chek Lap Kok, while Swire Group moved to Pacific Place in Admiralty.

Chater House has a total floor area of 438,500 net sq.ft. (498,000 sq ft. gross), was designed by architects Kohn Pedersen Fox. It was originally configured into 30 floors – 474,000 net sq. ft – of office accommodation above a three-level retail podium of 45,000 net sq.ft. (81,000 sq ft. gfa) and a three-level basement, which includes 112 parking spaces. When the project was announced, in 1997, the estimated cost was HK$2.3 billion, and would complete in 2003. Architecture firm Aedas were the architect for the Chater House. The main contractor was Gammon Construction.

The building is linked to the Central Elevated Walkway, also owned by Hong Kong Land.

In 2014, the display of Antony Gormley's art installation Event Horizon at Chater House was cancelled when US investment bank JPMorgan, which has offices in the building, asked Hongkong Land – the sponsor of Event Horizon – to cancel its support for the show after bank employee Dennis Li Junjie jumped to his death from the building's roof.

== Tenants ==
The main tenant of Chater House is JPMorgan, who have their Asia–Pacific headquarters in the building. Other current tenants include Franklin Templeton Investments and Jane Street, and previous tenants include the Securities and Futures Commission.

Previously the Hong Kong Institute of Surveyors was headquartered in the Swire House.

== Nearby buildings ==
- Jardine House
- Exchange Square
- Mandarin Oriental (formerly Queen's Building)
- Alexandra House
- Prince's Building
- The Landmark
- Cheung Kong Center
- HSBC Building
- Standard Chartered Hong Kong
- Three Garden Road
- World-Wide House
- Wheelock House
- Hang Seng Bank Headquarters Building
