= Central Building (Hong Kong) =

Building in Hong Kong

Coordinates: 22.28134°N 114.15726°E

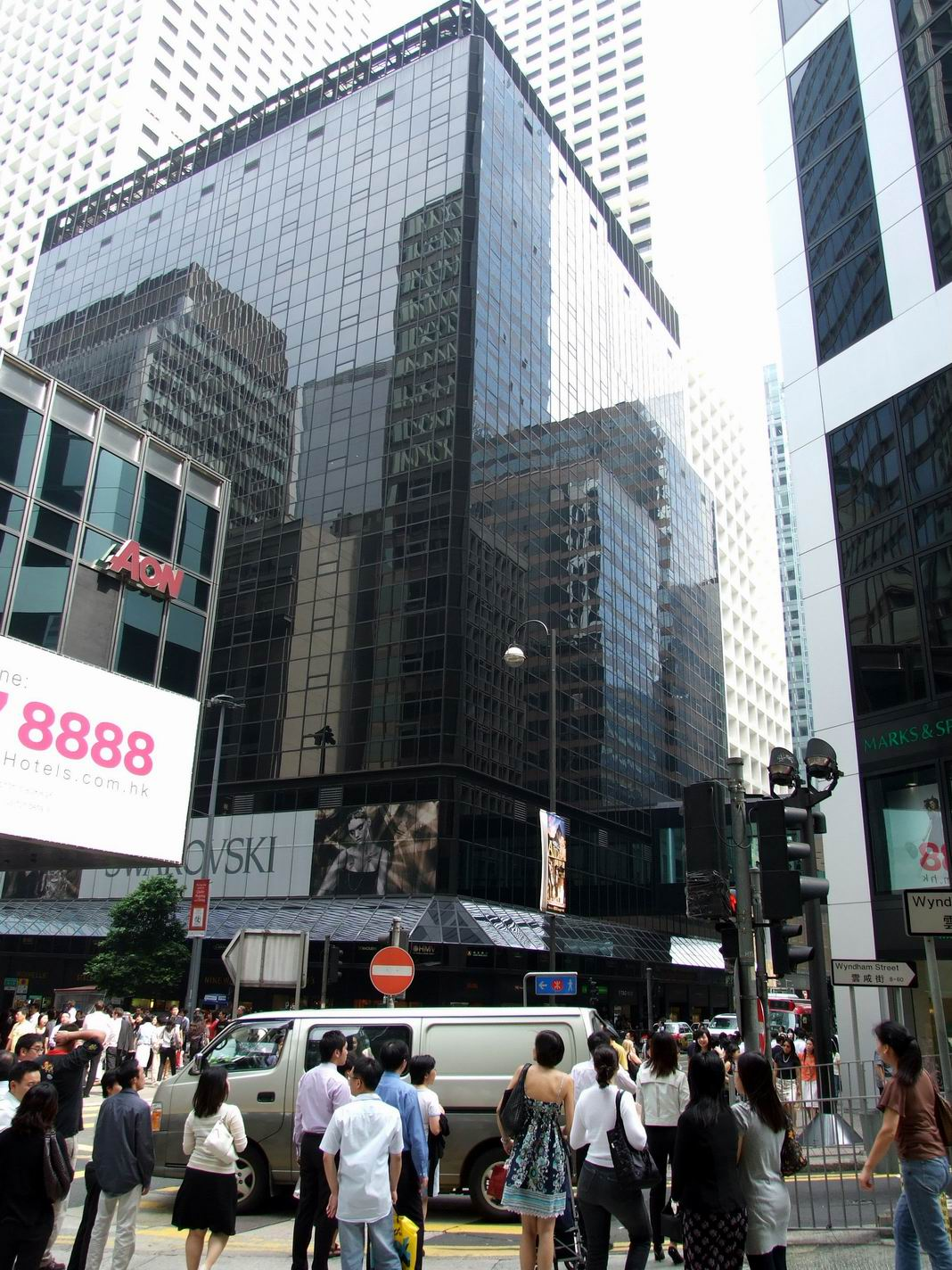
Central Building

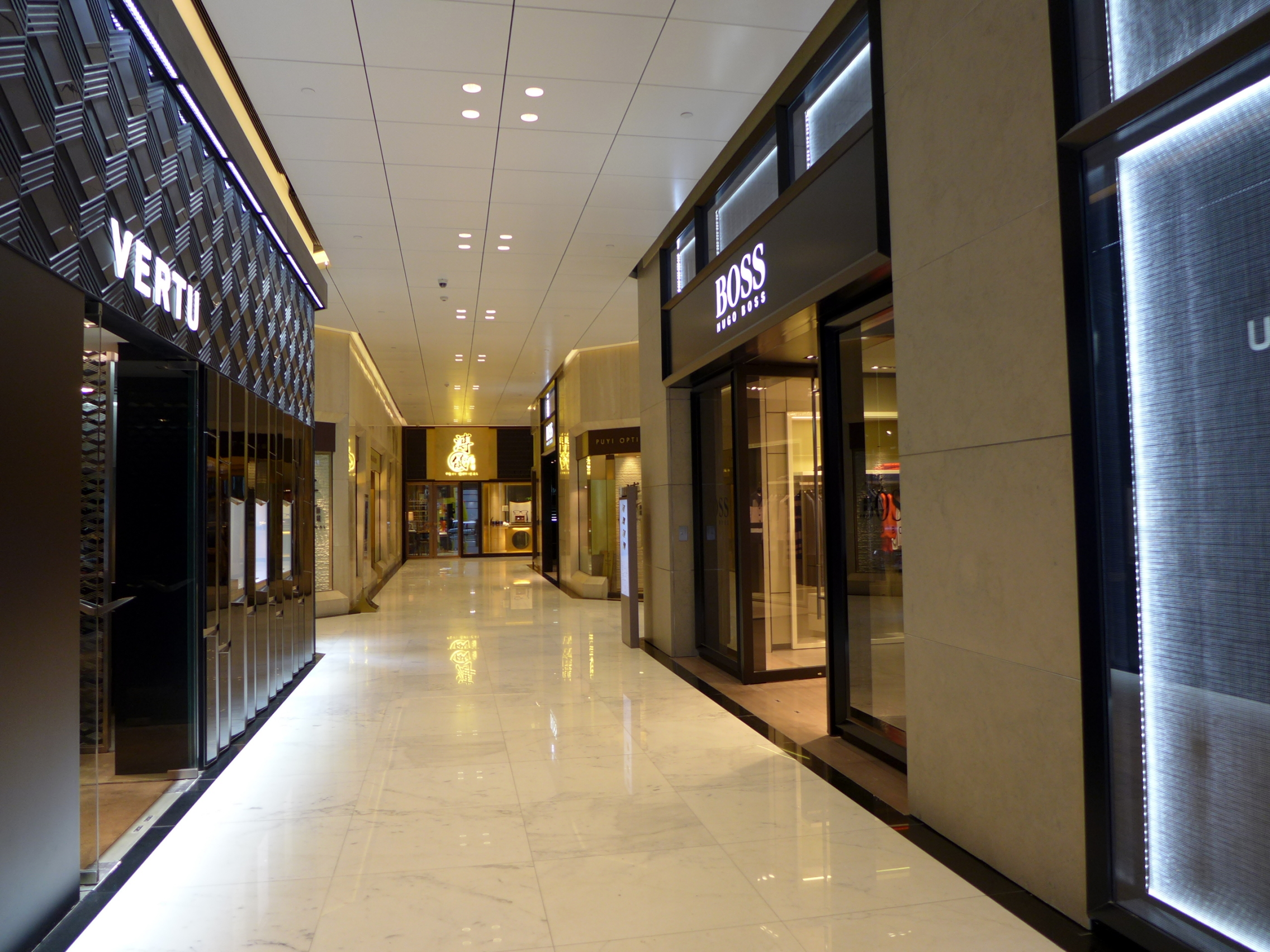
Ground floor Shops of Central Building

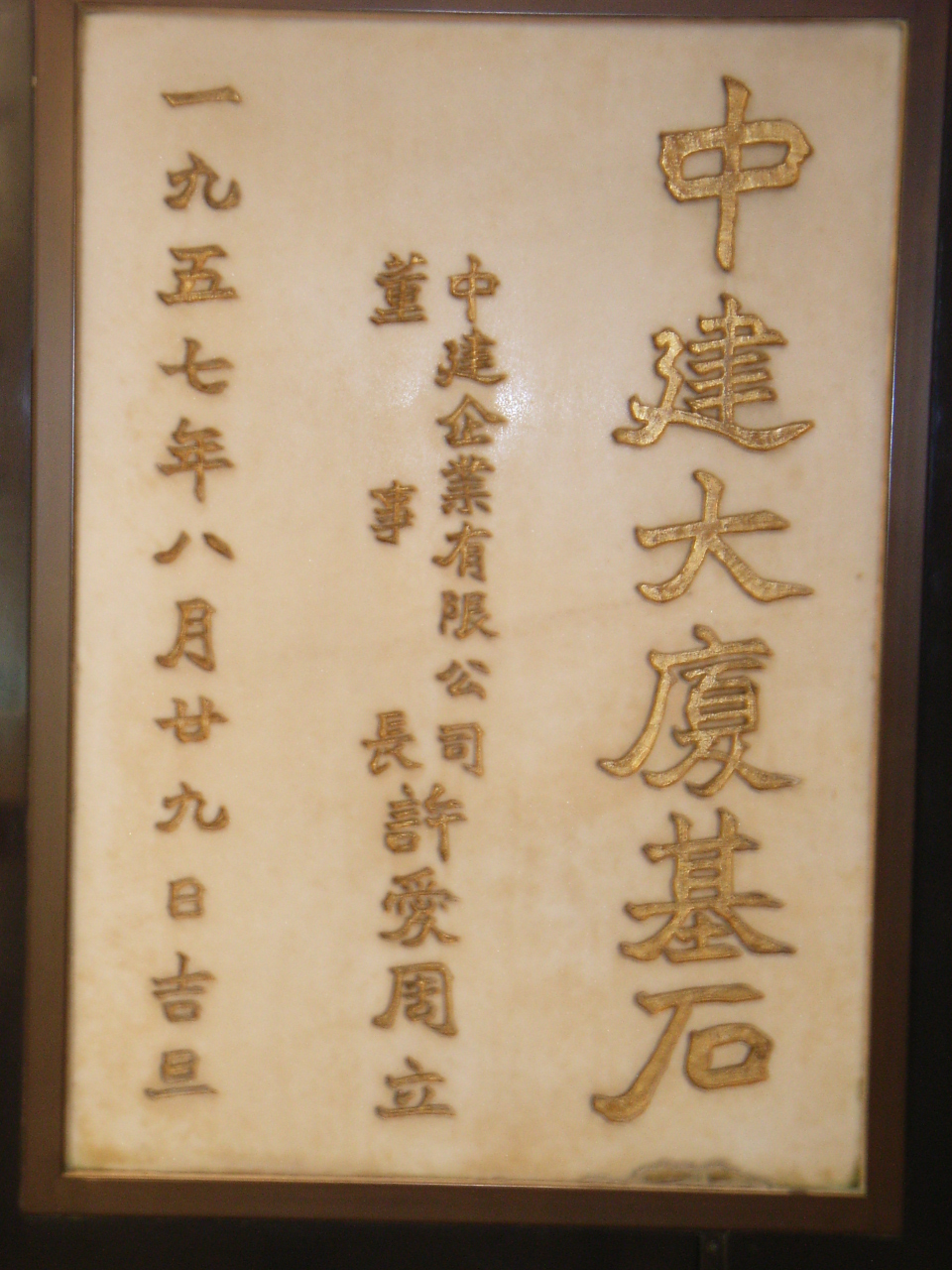
Foundation stone

Central Building (Chinese: 中建大廈) is a building located at 1–3 Pedder Street, at the corner of Queen's Road Central, in Central, Hong Kong.

== History ==
The location was previously occupied by the Hong Kong Hotel. In 1957, under the ownership of Central Development Limited (中建企業), the former hotel building was renovated and rebuilt. In 1958, it was completed as Central Building.

The original stock certificates of Central Development Limited bore the signature of lead investor Kwan Fan-Fat (關奮發), owner of Golden Dahlia (金芍藥), the 1949 Hong Kong Derby winner. The commemorative marble foundation stone of Central Building was dedicated by its chairman Hui Oi-Chow (許愛周) on 29 August 1957. Mr. Hui was the patriarch of the Hui family, one of the four big families of Hong Kong.

== Features ==
It has 17 floors, with the ground floor and basement level being shops and the other floors being offices. Each floor has a floor area of about 14,654 square feet (1,361.4 m^{2}). Central Building is currently also known for its many medical practitioner tenants.

== Nearby landmarks ==
- The Landmark
- Pedder Building
- Queen's Road
- Wheelock House
- Entertainment Building
