= Theatre Lane =

Street in Central, Hong Kong

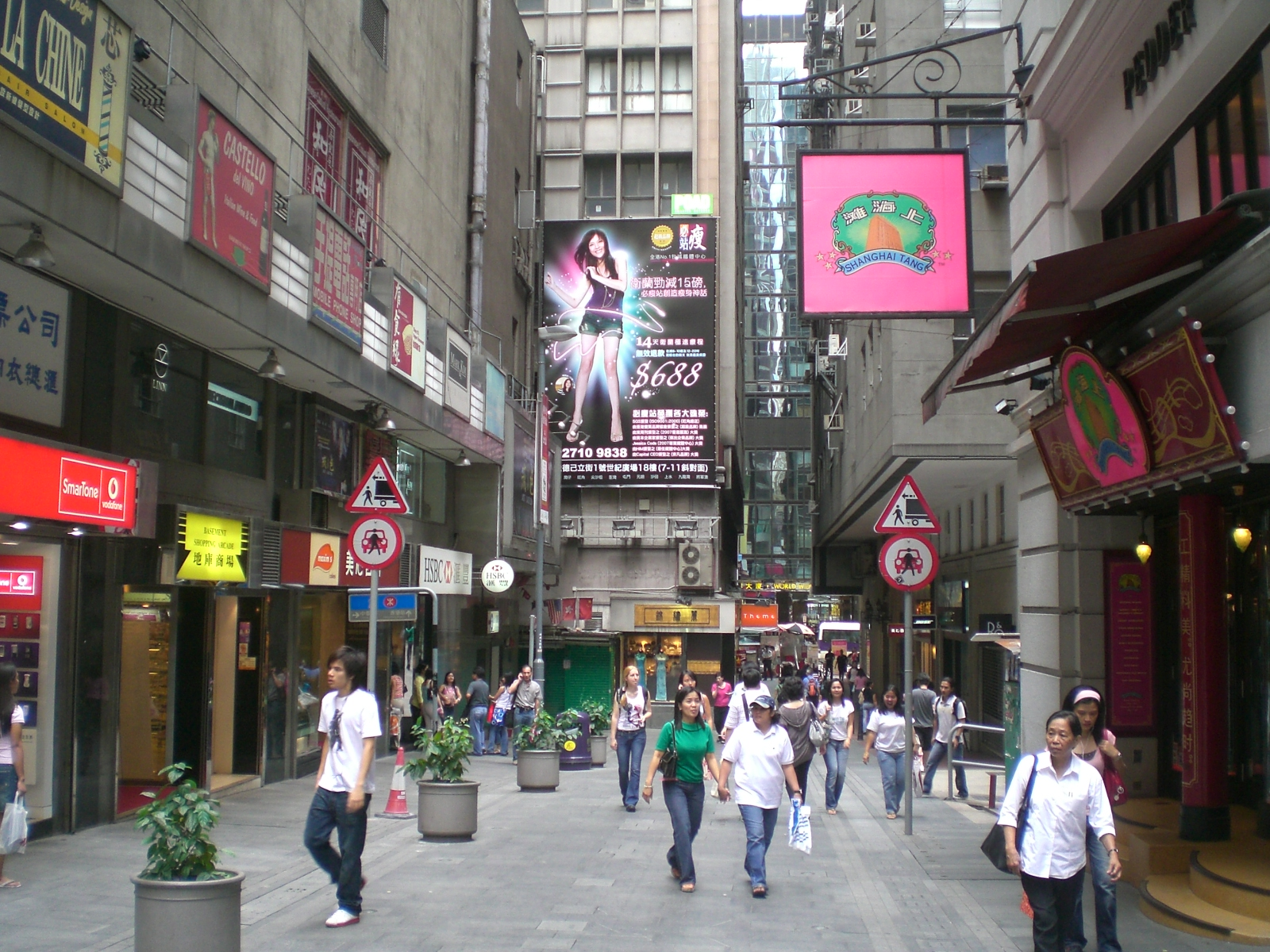
Theatre Lane

Theatre Lane (Chinese: 戲院里) is a street in Central, Hong Kong Island, Hong Kong. It was named after the Queen's Theatre, which was located at the southern end of the street from 1924 to 2007.

== History ==
Theatre lane was already a thriving commercial establishment before the war. For example, at the north end of the theater, where the Tak Shing Building is now located, there used to be a large British department store called Whiteaway Laidlaw. During the Japanese occupation, in accordance with Japanization policy, the company's assets were confiscated, handed over to Japanese zaibatsu for management and Tamaya department store (玉屋百貨) was opened on September 1, 1941 on the site.

== Notable buildings along the street ==
The following is a list of notable buildings along Theatre Lane, but their entrances might be located on Pedder Street.

- Pedder Building
- Wheelock House
- LHT Tower, formerly Queen's Theatre

== See also ==
- List of streets and roads in Hong Kong
