= Hongkong Hotel =

Former hotel in Hong Kong

Coordinates: 22.28118°N 114.15844°E

Hongkong Hotel 香港大酒店
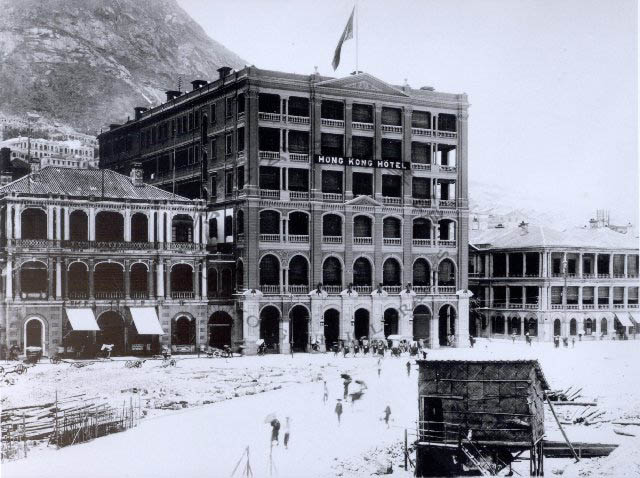
- The Hongkong Hotel on the Central Praya (c.1900); Jardine Matheson opposite (right)
- Interactive map of the Hongkong Hotel 香港大酒店 area

General information
- Location: Pedder Street and Queen's Road, Hong Kong
- Opening: 1868
- Closed: 1952
- Owner: The Hongkong Hotel Company

Technical details
- Floor count: 6

...the Hong Kong Hotel, constructed after the model of large hotels in London. It has not proved to the shareholders a very profitable undertaking, being on a scale too vast for the requirements of the place. It is rented and conducted by a Chinaman, and none but Chinese cooks and waiters are employed. The management is good and the hotel comfortable. To the visitor, the large dining hall presents an animated and interesting scene, and he finds on further experience that the arrangements are perfect and the fare unexceptionable. The native waiters are remarkable no less for promptitude and politesse than for the spotless purity of their light silk or linen robes, and the fluency of their "pidgin" English in which they converse; this is however a jargon intelligible only to the residents.

—John Thomson (1837–1921), Illustrations of China and Its People, (London,1873-1874) "The Clock Tower, Hong Kong"

The Hongkong Hotel was Hong Kong's first luxury hotel modelled after sumptuous London hotels. It opened on Queen's Road and Pedder Street in 1868, later expanding into the Victoria Harbour waterfront of Victoria City in 1893.

== History ==
The original hotel stood roughly on the site of the present Central Building at Queen's Road Central and Pedder Street. It was owned by The Hongkong Hotel Company, which later became Hongkong and Shanghai Hotels, current owner of The Peninsula Hotels chain.

In the late 1880s the six-storey north wing extension was built on the waterfront, with entrances on Pedder Street, Queen's Road and Praya Central (now Des Voeux Road Central). Competing in all respects with the Peak Hotel, owned by the Star Ferry Company, the management provided a special launch to meet arriving passengers on incoming P&O mail steamers and ferry them direct to the hotel's pier.

A shop of Kuhn & Komor was located on the ground floor of the hotel, along Queen's Road.

After the north wing burned down in 1929, the original part of the hotel, especially the large Gripps Restaurant, continued to be popular with the public, but the hotel eventually closed in 1952. The hotel building was bought by the owner of the 1949 Hong Kong Derby Champion and lead investor of a company which was later renamed Central Development Limited. Extensive renovation was done, but the part which once housed the popular Gripps Restaurant was torn down. In 1958, Central Building opened as a modern retail and office building, as it has remained at the present day.

== North wing ==
The six-storey north wing of the hotel facing the waterfront opened in 1893. It replaced the Melcher's Building, which itself was formerly owned by Dent & Co., where the west wing of its "princely hong" headquarters was located.

The north wing of the hotel burned down on New Year's Day, 1926 and in 1928 the site was acquired by Hong Kong Land and Gloucester Tower constructed in 1932. It was redeveloped into The Landmark in 1979.

== See also ==
- List of lost buildings and structures in Hong Kong
