= Shanghai Tang =

Hong Kong luxury fashion brand intended to rejuvenate 1920s and 1930s Chinese fashion

- Type: Private
- Industry: Fashion
- Founded: Hong Kong (1994)
- Founder: David Tang
- Headquarters: Hong Kong Shanghai
- Number of locations: 34 (2009)
- Area served: Worldwide
- Owner: UTAN Group
- Website: shanghaitang.com

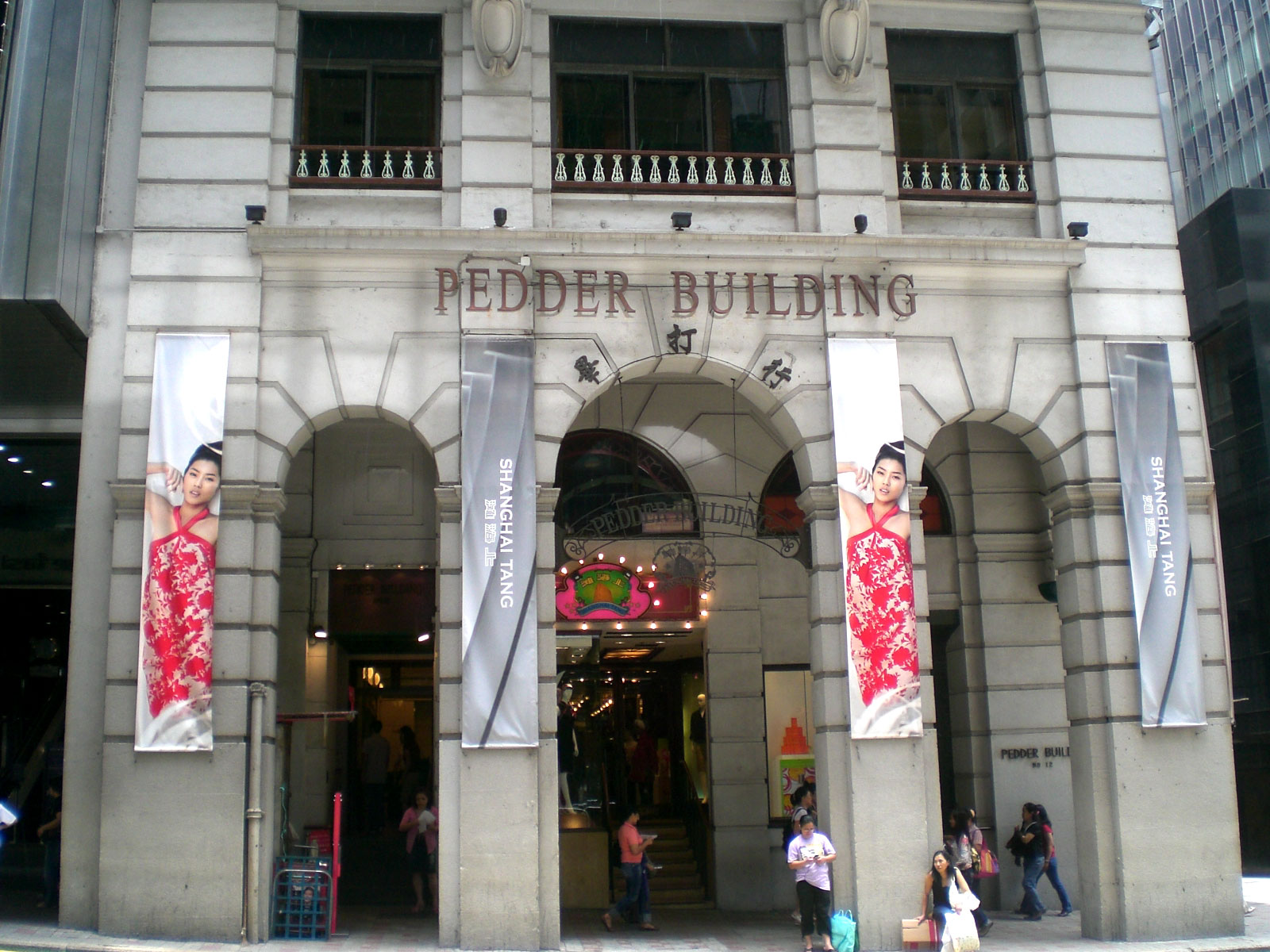
Former Shanghai Tang flagship store in Central, Hong Kong

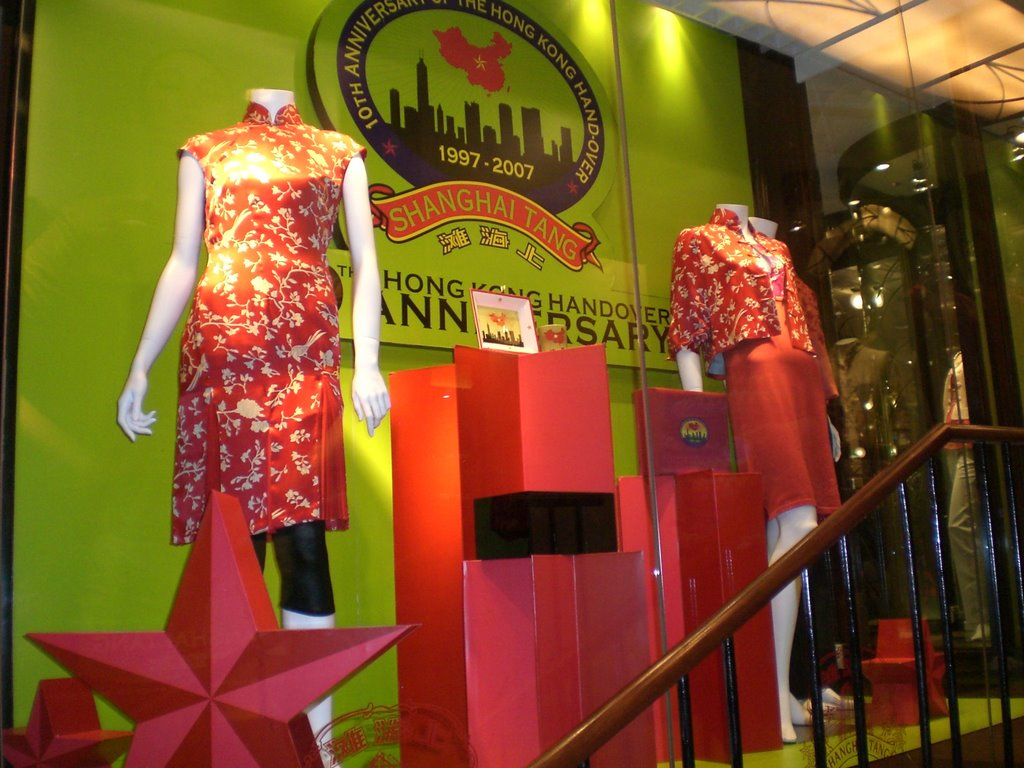
Pedder Street shop window

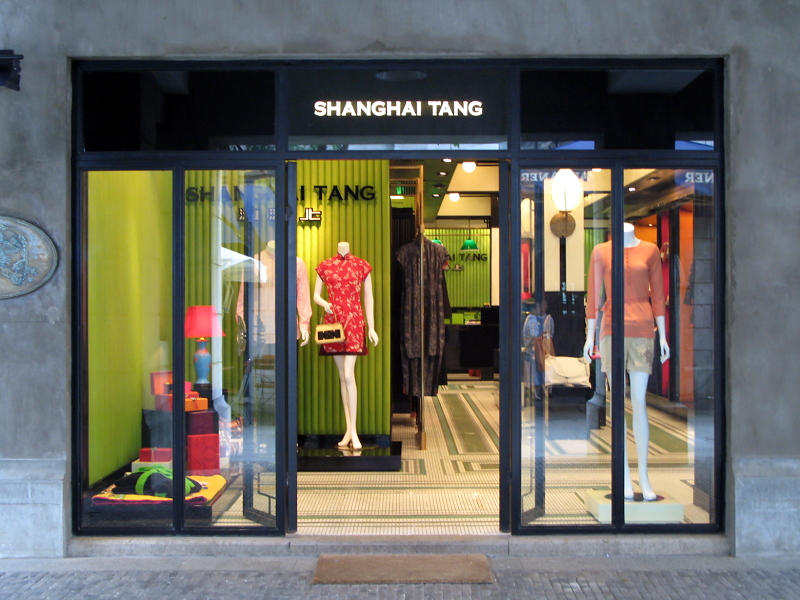
Store in Xintiandi, Shanghai

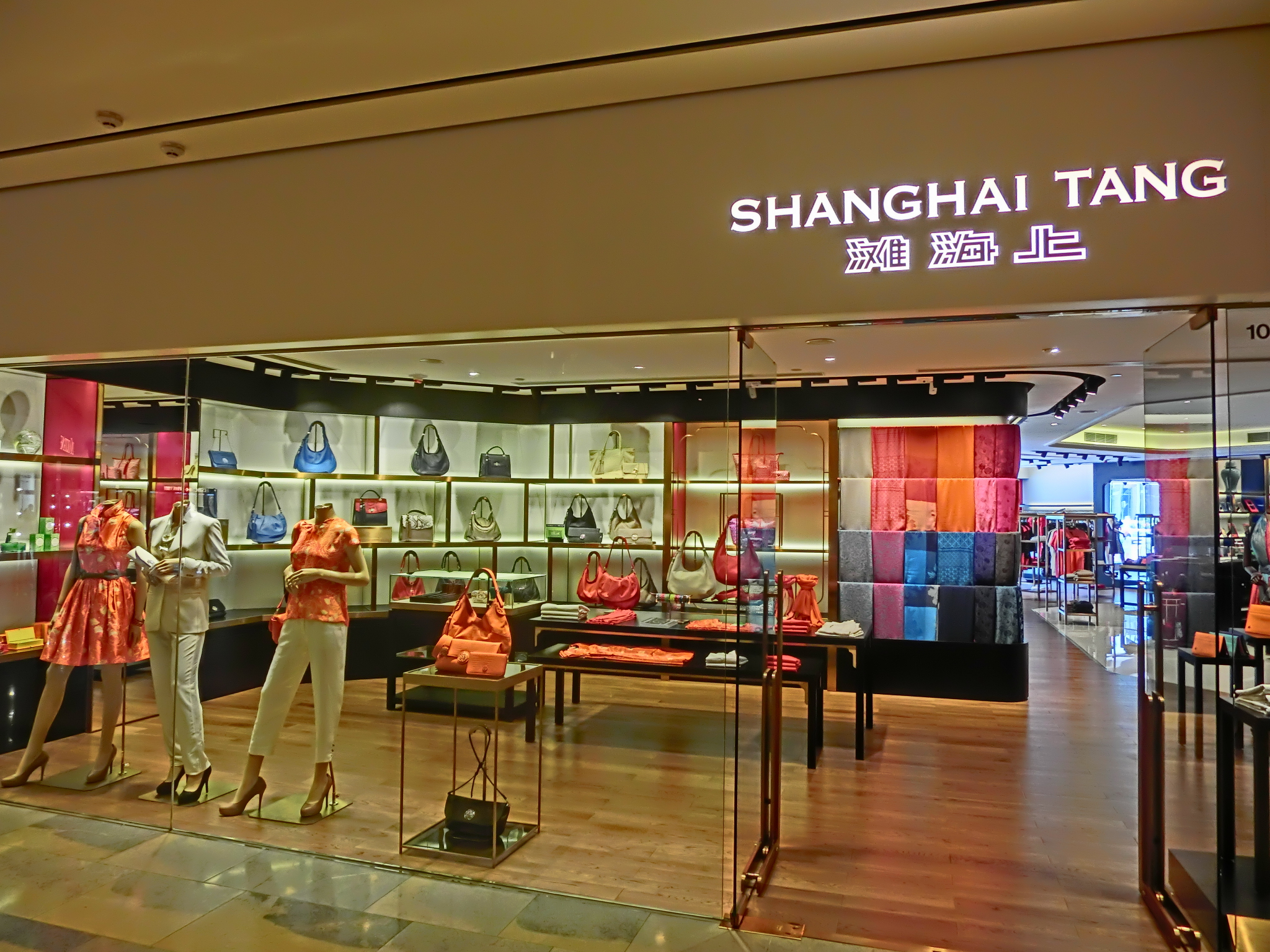
Store in Pacific Place, Hong Kong

Shanghai Tang (Chinese: 上海灘) is a Hong Kong luxury fashion house founded in 1994 by Hong Kong businessman David Tang. The brand is known for its luxury homeware collection and fine bone china. In 1998, Richemont acquired David Tang's controlling stake in the business.

David Tang stated that Shanghai Tang is a Chinese label that set out to rejuvenate Chinese fashion of the 1920s and 1930s. The fundamental design concept is inspired by 1920s Cheongsam combined with the modernity of the 21st century. Shanghai Tang is noted for its use of Chinese culture and heritage in its product styling, branding and marketing.

== History ==
=== Early years ===
Shanghai Tang was partially inspired by Tang's desire to create a global brand that represented China, stating, "as Coca-Cola is American, as Mercedes is German, I think there should be something that is quintessentially Chinese". After founding the China Club in 1991, Tang moved to incorporate his tastes of fusing Shanghainese design with modern style by forming Shanghai Tang in 1994. Its original flagship location is on the ground floor of Pedder Building, Central, Hong Kong and it is now dual-headquartered in Shanghai and Hong Kong.

Initially, Shanghai Tang was a fashion house for custom high-end tailoring, employing tailors from Shanghai who left during the Communist Revolution. Tang expanded his business to sell ready-to-wear items in 1996. The name Shànghǎi Tān (上海灘) literally means "Shanghai beach" and refers to the Shanghai Bund, and by extension Shanghai.

=== Expansion into a global brand, and resulting change ===
The late 1990s and early 2000s were marked by change for Shanghai Tang. Tang wanted to turn the company into a global brand, and so his Hong Kong location was followed by 24 outlets worldwide over the years, including Bangkok, Beijing, Honolulu, London, Miami, New York City (1997-1999), Las Vegas, Madrid, Paris, Shanghai, Tokyo, Singapore and Macau. They are often located in well-known areas such as Singapore's Orchard Road, Bangkok's Sukhumvit Road, and Shanghai's Xintiandi.

Shanghai Tang's first American store was opened in New York on November 21, 1997, and in 1998, the Swiss company Richemont bought a controlling stake in the fashion house. However, the New York store, located on Madison Avenue, closed in less than two years due to lower-than-expected sales, relative to the high rent. The store was moved to a smaller venue in 2001.

In 2001, Raphael le Masne de Chermont, from the parent company Richemont, was appointed CEO of Shanghai Tang. In addition, Joanne Ooi joined the company as creative director the same year. As the chief executive, Le Masne de Chermont wanted to figure out a way to cater to both the Chinese and international market, remarking, "[Shanghai Tang was] too dependent on Western people visiting Hong Kong, and we needed to transform the brand into something mainland Chinese wanted to buy". As part of the strategy to revitalize Shanghai Tang, Ooi traveled across the country, taking notes on Chinese culture. She then picked themes based on her notes that formed the basis of the company's seasonal collections. Le Masne de Chermont and Ooi opted to transform the brand from 1930s Shanghai, into a more contemporary style that retained its vibrant colours from previous designs (Heine & Phan 2013, p. 16).

Shanghai Tang helped design costumes for the 2004 Yonfan film Colour Blossoms, starring Teresa Cheung.

As part of their focus on the Chinese market, Shanghai Tang created the Mandarin Collar Society in 2007. It is an invitation-only club to promote shirts with a mandarin collar as standard work attire in Asia. Ooi left Shanghai Tang by the end of the following year to work for a biotech company.

=== Present ===
After 17 years, in October 2011, the company's 6,300-square-foot flagship store in Hong Kong's Pedder Building closed, with rising rents being cited as the main reason. Shanghai Tang lost the space to American retailer Abercrombie & Fitch, who were prepared to pay two-and-a-half times the original rent. As of 2023, there are three stores across Hong Kong as well as stores in Shanghai, Beijing, Singapore, Kuala Lumpur and other Asian cities, along with a string of Shanghai Tang cafes and restaurants in China.

In 2014 Shanghai Tang celebrated its 20th anniversary in Shanghai.

In July 2017, Richemont sold Shanghai Tang to the Italian entrepreneur Alessandro Bastagli (Chairman of A. Moda) and the Hong Kong private equity fund Cassia Investments for an undisclosed amount. Then in December 2018, the Chinese private equity firm Lunar Capital acquired Shanghai Tang for an undisclosed amount.

In 2019, Shanghai Tang celebrated its silver jubilee by collaborating with Chinese artist Xu Bing on calligraphic artwork inspired by Shanghai Tang's vision.

From 2020 onwards, Shanghai Tang became a core brand of UTAN Group, a leading Global luxury group with brands in art, culture and lifestyle. Commencing in 2023, Shanghai Tang began a large expansion strategy across Singapore, Shanghai, Beijing and other global cities. Shanghai Tang also launched its 2023 fall winter collection at Milan Fashion Week, and saw sales from its homewards and lifestyle products begin to surge with new collections in collaboration with leading Chinese contemporary artists.

=== Lawsuits ===
The China Club (China Investment Incorporations) Limited filed a lawsuit against the estate of the late Sir David Tang in the High Court, alleging breaches of fiduciary duty. The suit claims that Tang improperly transferred over HK$100 million from the company's funds to his personal accounts or those of related companies, violating his responsibilities as a director.

Key allegations include:

1. Cash Transfers: Between 2016 and 2017, Tang allegedly transferred more than HK$51.87 million from the club's account to his personal or controlled accounts.

2. Art Auction Proceeds: From 2007 to 2014, Tang is accused of auctioning artworks belonging to the club and depositing the HK$56.29 million proceeds into his own account.

3. Dividend Misappropriation: Between 1998 and 2016, he reportedly distributed over HK$6.74 million to himself during shareholder dividend distributions.

== Governance ==
=== Creative designers ===
- 2017-2018: Massimiliano Giornetti
- 2018-2020: Victoria Tang-Owen (daughter of the founder David Tang)

== In the popular culture ==
In Wong Kar-Wai film In the Mood for Love, Maggie Cheung wore the Shanghai Tang’s signature qipao.

== See also ==
- Shopping in Hong Kong
- Cheongsam
- Chinese fashion
