= Pedder Street =

Street in Hong Kong

Coordinates: 22.2826°N 114.1582°E

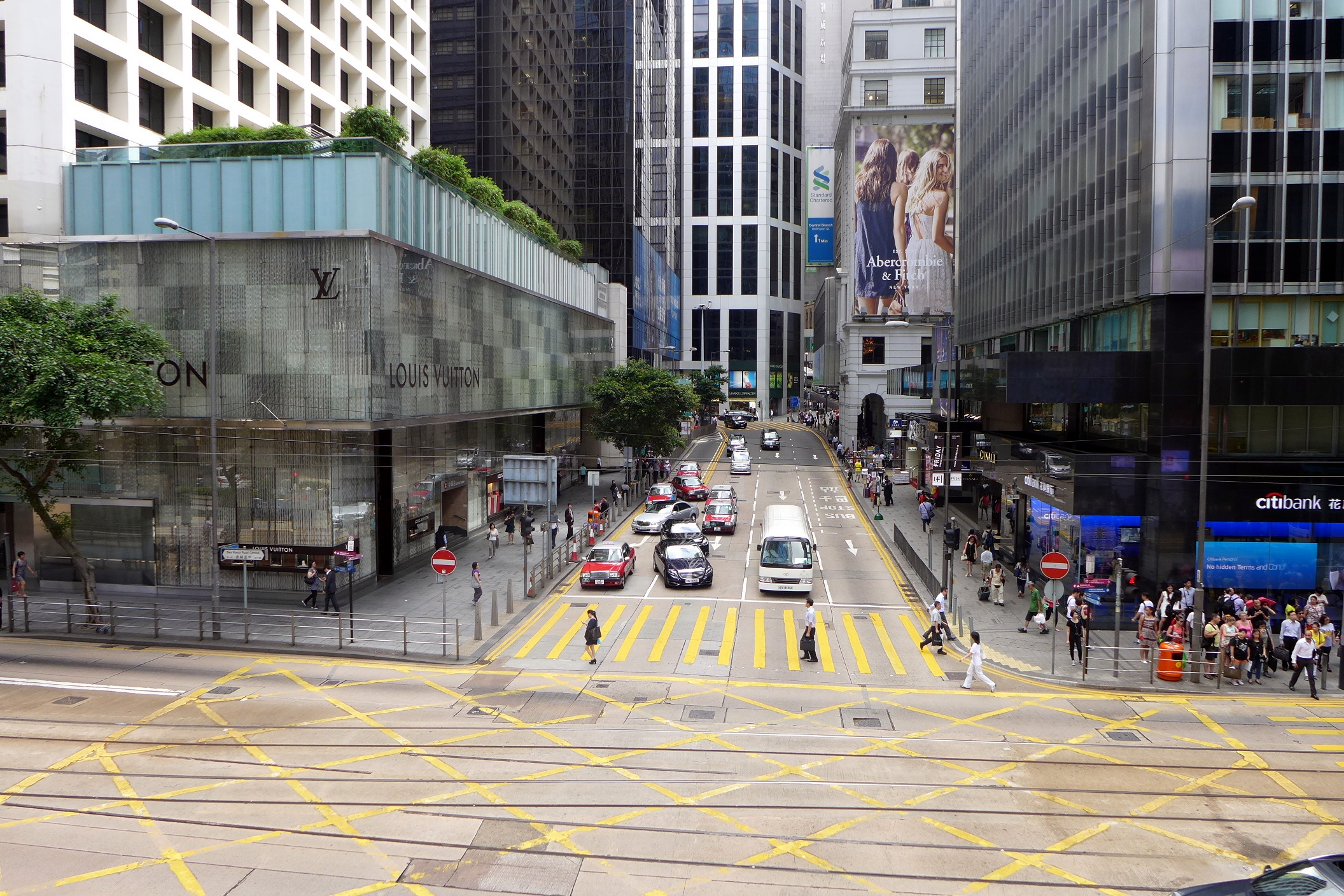
- Pedder Street in 2015

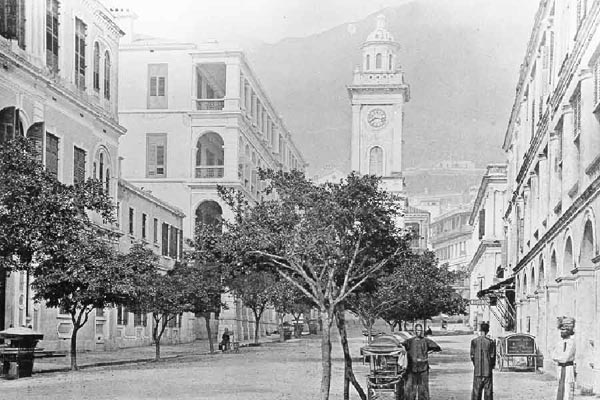
- Pedder Street in the 1870s
- Traditional Chinese: 畢打街
- Simplified Chinese: 毕打街
Transcriptions
Standard Mandarin
- Hanyu Pinyin: Bìdá Jiē
Yue: Cantonese
- Jyutping: Bat1 daa1 gaai1

Pedder Street is a major thoroughfare in the core of Hong Kong's Central District. It runs south–north from Queen's Road Central, continues through Des Voeux Road Central, and ends at its intersection with Connaught Road Central.

== History ==
The street was named after Lieutenant William Pedder, first lieutenant of the Nemesis, Britain's first ocean-going iron warship, and the first harbour master of Hong Kong. Pedder Street was established at the centre of Hong Kong's commerce in the early colonial days.

The premises of Hong Kong's two most powerful trading hongs at the time, Dent & Co. and Jardine, Matheson & Co., were located on The Praya Central, Victoria's original waterfront, on the opposite sides of Pedder Street. Dent & Co., one of the key founding members of The Hongkong and Shanghai Banking Corporation Limited, had a sprawling complex which stretched along the Praya, and a west wing which abutted Pedder Street.

Originally, Pedder Street ran from Pedder's Hill, where the Harbour Master's Office was established, south to north ending at Pedder's Wharf on the Praya. The street was extended north by 1904 when the Praya Reclamation Scheme finished transforming the old Praya into the modern day Des Voeux Road, along with a further stretch of land running north up to Connaught Road on which the General Post Office and Union Building were built.

The new pier built at the end of Pedder Street following the reclamation was named "Blake Pier" after the city's 13th Governor.

== Historical buildings ==
=== Pedder Wharf (1841–1890) ===
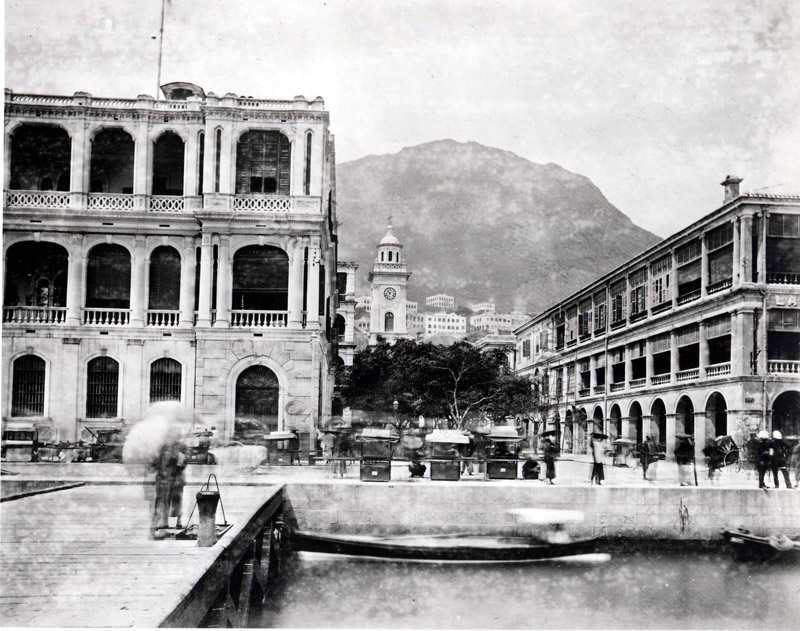
Pedder Street, viewed from the Wharf

Served as the official wharf of the colonial establishment from 1841 to 1890s.

In February 1886, the first pile of the new Pedder's Wharf was driven in 38 feet (12 m) from the praya wall. "Three similar piles have been towed over from Tsim Sha Tsui and are ready to be put in place". The new wharf, located at the junction of Pedder Street and Des Voeux Road, extended 195 feet (59 m) out from the praya wall, and was 40 feet (12 m) wide. Six sets of steps lead down to the water.

Pedder Wharf became landlocked after the big reclamation scheme of 1890–1904, and was replaced by Blake Pier.

=== Dent & Co offices ===
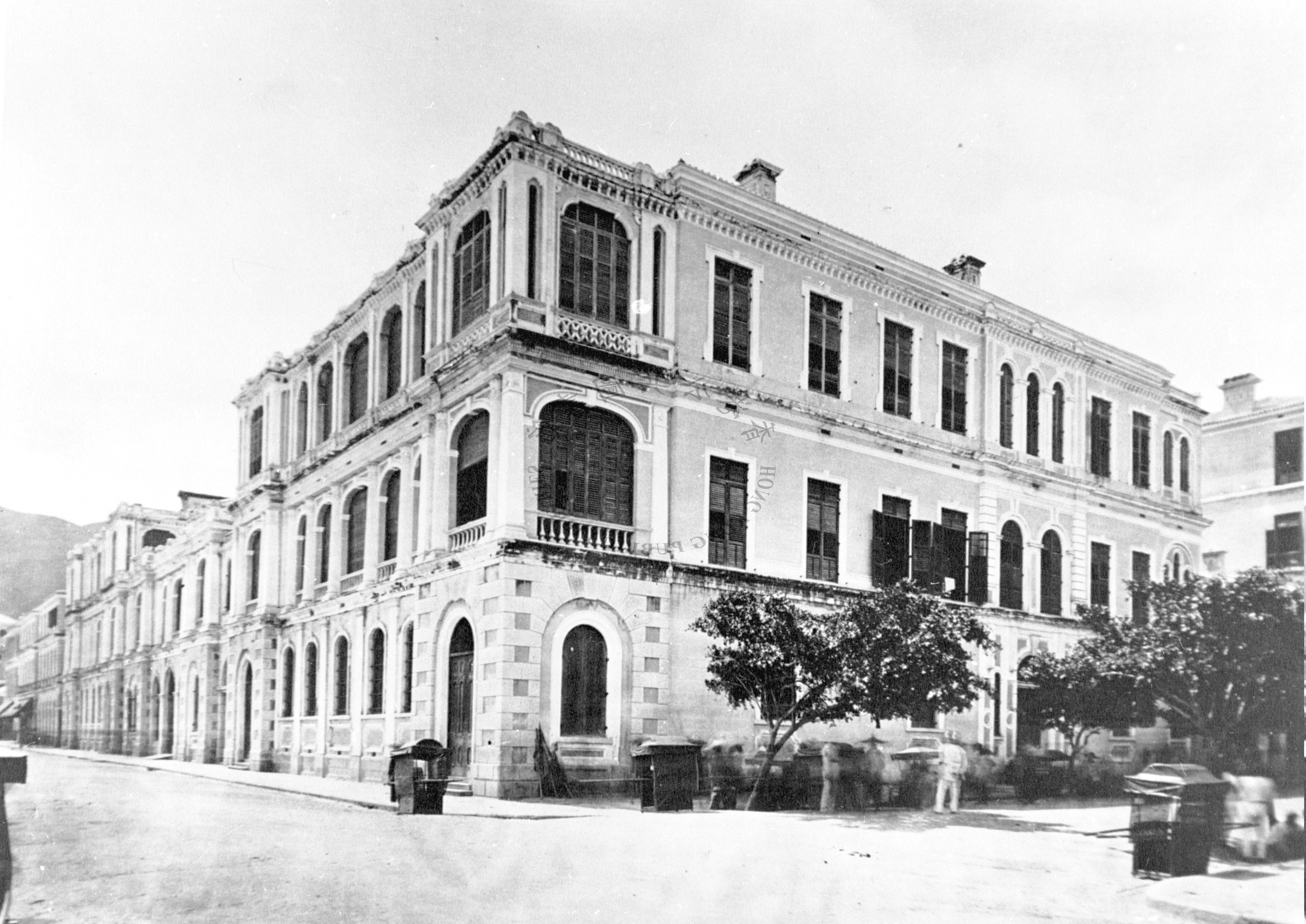
Dent & Co offices in 1869.

The palatial offices of Dent & Co. occupied the site where Gloucester Tower, The Landmark, stands today. They were originally constructed in 1850, and the site was redeveloped in 1864.

Dent & Co. went into financial distress in 1866 and sold half of its land on Pedder Street to the newly established Hongkong Hotel Company. The hotel was duly built, and became Hong Kong's first deluxe hotel. The remaining part of the west wing was let out to other trading firms.

=== Hong Kong Hotel (1866–1926) ===
The Hong Kong Hotel was Hong Kong's first deluxe hotel when it opened in 1866. In 1951, the hotel was closed down, and the building was bought up by a local Chinese investment group for office use. In 1957, the building was redeveloped into the present Central Building.

=== Clock Tower (1862–1913) ===
At the junction of Queen's Road with Wyndham Street and Pedder Street, opposite the old Post Office, is a monument erected by public subscription in 1862. Although at the present day absolutely useless owing to the high buildings since constructed around it, the Clock Tower remains as an obstruction to the traffic. During the past ten years the public have off and on agitated for its removal, but, as only to be expected in a Crown Colony, the community's wishes have been over-ridden by the views of the officials, who seem unable to see eye to eye with the people as to the obsolescence of a structure that has long since out-lived its usefulness.

—Picturesque Hong Kong: a handbook for travellers.
Hong Kong: Tillotson & Sons. 1911. p.65

In 1862, at the southern end of the street where it meets Queen's Road, the Pedder Street Clock Tower was completed and was the landmark of Central until it was demolished. It chimed for the first time at midnight on 31 December 1862.

The 80 feet (24 m) tall clock tower with a lighted dial, designed by a Mr. Rawlings, was to be funded by subscriptions, but the lack of public response meant that many of the more elaborate decorative features were jettisoned. In the end, a donation was secured from Scotsman Douglas Lapraik, one of the most successful Tai-pans who founded the Hong Kong and Whampoa Dock Company, precursor of Hutchison Whampoa.

The clock tower was taken down in 1913. In 1915, one of the clock faces was integrated into the clock tower at the Kowloon–Canton Railway terminus in Tsim Sha Tsui.

=== GPO II (1846–1911), GPO III (1911–1976), Supreme Court (1846–1912) ===
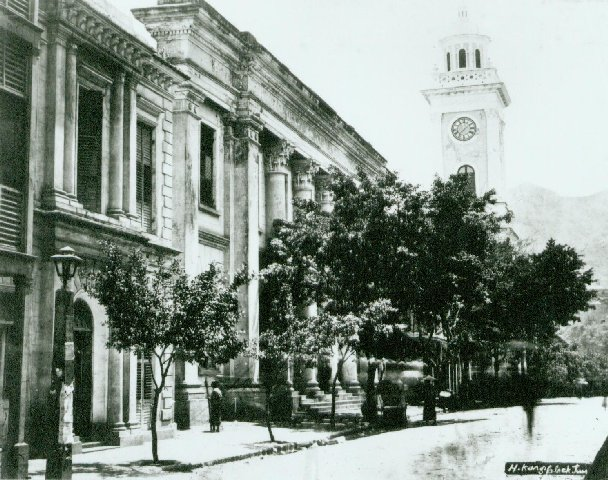
1880 view of the Courthouse (centre) and the GPO (left), with the Clock Tower in the background.

In its heyday, Dent also occupied the south-western corner of Pedder Street (and Queen's Road), where it had established a "Tea Exchange". In 1846, it was transformed into the Treasury (庫務署), Supreme Court and General Post Office. This land was auctioned in 1921, when it achieved a price of HK$50 per square foot. The resulting China Building (華人行) was completed in 1924.

Further reclamations had taken place in the meantime (ca.1900). The General Post Office was relocated in 1911 to new premises on the newly reclaimed (northern) section of Pedder Street where the wharf once was. It was a typical Edwardian municipal construction of granite and red brick, situated there until 1976; the Supreme Court was relocated in January 1912 to a new building constructed on reclaimed land, where it remained until 1985.

To make way for Pedder station of the MTR, the General Post Office was moved to Connaught Place. The old building was demolished in 1976, and World-Wide House was built in its place.

=== Pedder Building (since 1924) ===
Pedder Building has occupied the site next to the China Building since 1924. The basement suite of the building was occupied for most of the post-war period by the auctioneering firm Lammert Bros. which had been operating in Hong Kong since 1855. The basement was occupied by Shanghai Tang's flagship store until October 2011. American clothing retailer Abercrombie & Fitch moved into the premises and three upper storeys in August 2012.

=== Jardine House (1841 – 1976) ===
The first Jardine House, headquarters of Jardine, Matheson & Co., was probably built around 1841 after Jardine's successful bid for its lots on The Praya Central. In 1908, the second Jardine House was built. It was rebuilt in around 1956, and reborn in the early 1970s as Wheelock House, current headquarters of Wheelock and Company Limited, controlling shareholder of The Wharf (Holdings) Limited, a major conglomerate in Hong Kong.

== Current buildings ==
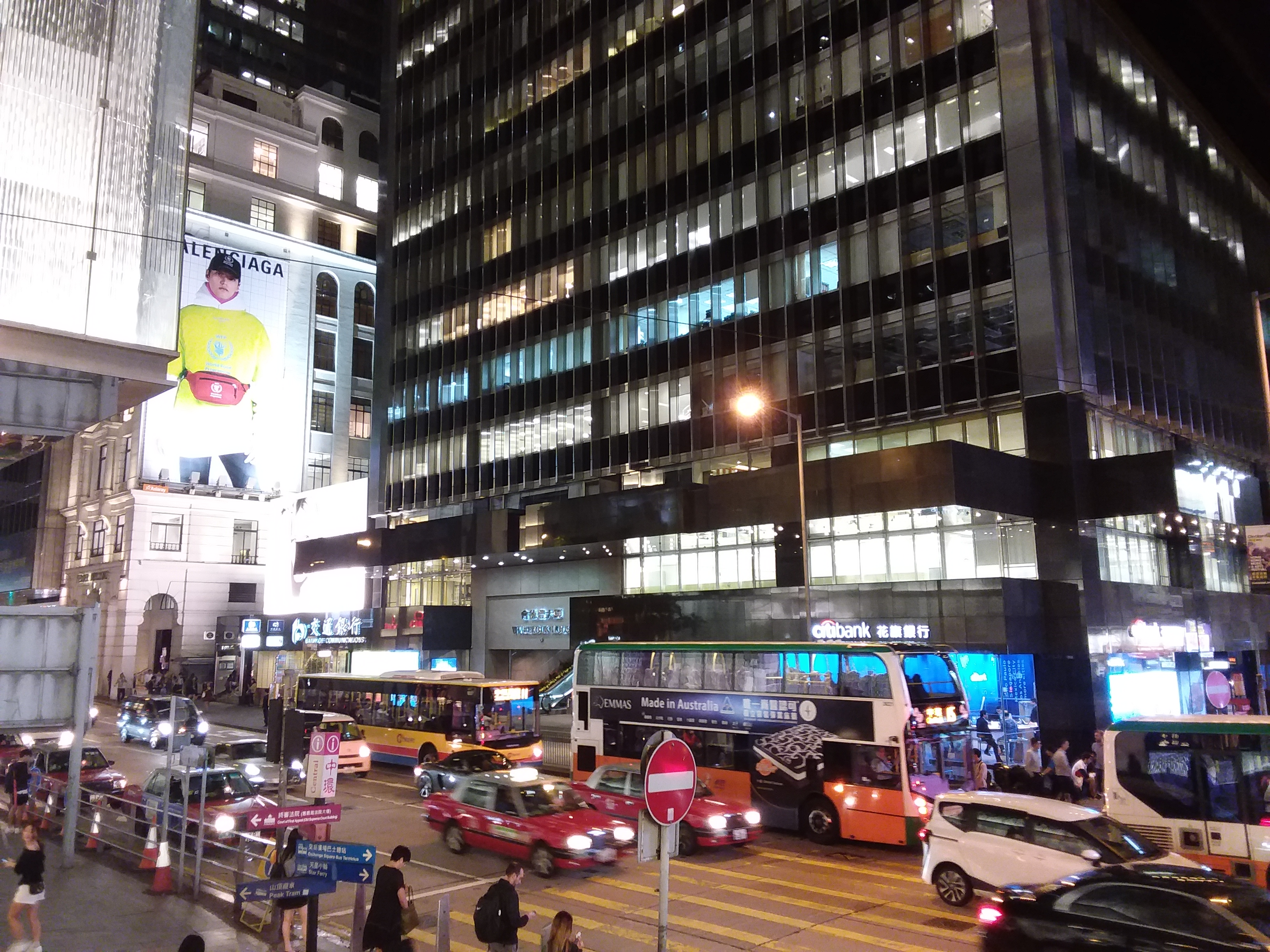
Pedder Street, 2018. The corner building is Wheelock House.

Current buildings along the street include:

- Pedder Building
- Wheelock House
- The Landmark, an office and shopping development
- Chater House
- World-Wide House
