= Hongkong Land =

Real estate developer

Hongkong Land Holdings Limited
- Company type: Public
- Traded as: LSE: HKLD; SGX: H78; BSX: HKLBD.BH
- Industry: Property
- Founded: 1889
- Founder: Sir Paul Chater; James Johnstone Keswick
- Headquarters: c/o 8th Floor, One Exchange Square, Central, Hong Kong Island, Hong Kong (Bermuda domiciled)
- Key people: John Witt (Chairman); Michael Smith (CEO)
- Services: Property development; Property management
- Revenue: US$2.67 billion (FY 2018)
- Net income: US$1,036 million (FY 2018)
- Total assets: US$38 billion (31 Dec 2018)
- Number of employees: 2,090 (31 Dec 2018)
- Parent: Jardine Matheson (50%)
- Subsidiaries: MCL Land
- Website: hkland.com
- Footnotes / references Underlying profit attributable to shareholders – US$1,036 million (FY 2018) and gross assets excluding cash – US$38 billion (31 Dec 2018)

Hongkong Land
- Chinese: 置地控股有限公司
Transcriptions
Standard Mandarin
- Hanyu Pinyin: Zhìdì Kònggǔ Yǒuxiàn Gōngsi
Yue: Cantonese
- Jyutping: zi3 dei6 hung3 gu2 jau5 haan6 gung1 si1

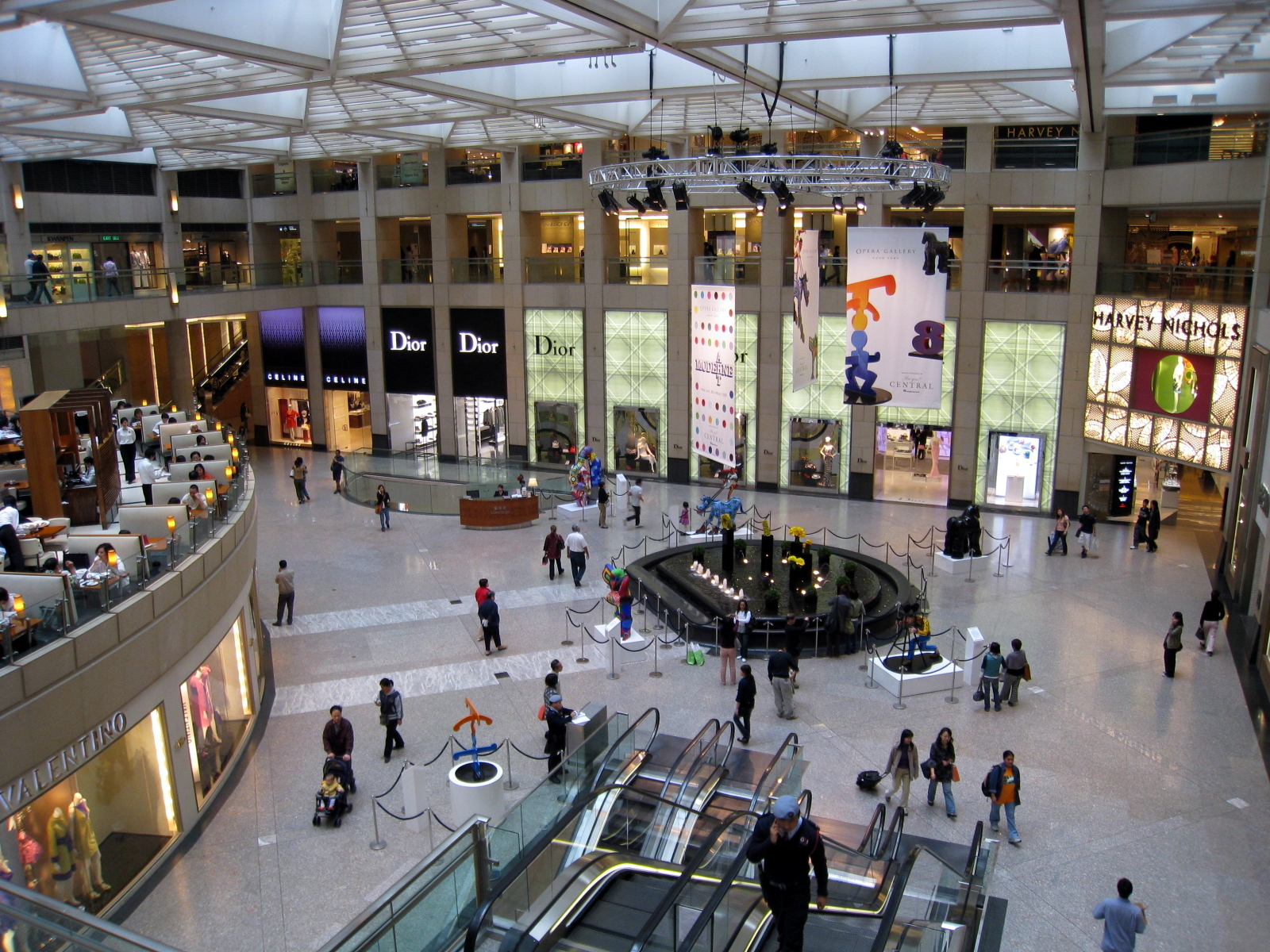
Landmark Atrium, property owned by Hongkong Land in Central

Hongkong Land (HKL) is a property investment, management and development group with commercial and residential property interests across Asia. It owns and manages some 850,000 sq. m. of office and retail property in Asia, principally in Hong Kong and Singapore. Its Hong Kong portfolio represents some 450,000 sq. m. of commercial property, making it the single largest landlord in Central, Hong Kong. In Singapore it has 165,000 sq. m. of office space mainly held through joint ventures. Its subsidiary MCL Land is a residential developer. Hongkong Land also has a 50 per cent interest in World Trade Center Jakarta, an office complex in Central Jakarta that it shares with the Murdaya family's (owner of Pondok Indah) Central Cipta Murdaya Group and a number of residential and mixed-use projects under development in cities across Greater China and Southeast Asia - including WF CENTRAL, a luxury retail centre in Wangfujing, Beijing.

Hongkong Land was founded in 1889. Hongkong Land Holdings Ltd is incorporated in Bermuda. It has a standard listing on the London Stock Exchange as its primary listing and secondary listings in Bermuda and Singapore. The Group's assets and investments are managed from Hong Kong by Hongkong Land Limited. Hongkong Land is 50 per cent owned by Jardine Matheson Holdings.

== Present ==
=== Presence in Hong Kong ===
Hongkong Land is the single largest landlord in Central, Hong Kong. In recent decades, the company focused on upgrading its commercial buildings in Central. In 2003, the redevelopment of Swire House into the new Chater House was completed. Major renovations have since been carried out in the Prince's Building. The Landmark has also been redeveloped, with the Landmark Mandarin Oriental Hotel and York House added. Hongkong Land has also redeveloped The Forum, the retail block at Exchange Square, into a 5-story office block, which is wholly leased to Standard Chartered Hong Kong.

In early 2012, a new brand "LANDMARK" was launched covering the company's four most famous shopping destinations The Landmark, Alexandra House, Chater House and Prince's Building, which are linked by pedestrian bridges, part of the Central Elevated Walkway. It was accompanied by a new logo "L", representing LANDMARK and luxury retail.

The company has also developed three luxury residential buildings on Hong Kong Island in recent years, namely Serenade, The Sail at Victoria and Ivy on Belcher's.

In October 2006, Hongkong Land hosted the CENTRAL Rat Race for the first time in the heart of Central, which has since become an annual event. This charity relay event helps raise funds for MINDSET, a registered charity supporting mental-health related organisations and projects in Hong Kong and mainland China. The inaugural race raised over HK$2 million and as of 31 December 2015, some HK$25 million has been raised.

=== Business in the rest of Asia ===
Hongkong Land has expanded its business outside Hong Kong in recent years, and has significant interests across Asia, mostly in a joint venture with local developers, including the Keppel Group in Singapore, the CIFI Group in Shanghai and the Longfor and China Merchants groups in Chongqing.

In its commercial portfolio, in Singapore, it has an attributable interest in some 1.8 million square feet of commercial space. Following One Raffles Link, the company developed One Raffles Quay, its second commercial complex in Singapore, in the Marina Bay area. It also has a one-third interest in the Marina Bay Financial Centre which was completed in 2012. The company owns a 50% stake in Jakarta Land, which is expanding its complex of World Trade Center Jakarta in the central business district of Jakarta. Hongkong Land also owns interests in the Gaysorn Village in Bangkok, developed the WF CENTRAL shopping centre in Beijing, Exchange Square in Phnom Penh, and two office buildings in Hanoi. In Macau, Hongkong Land has developed One Central Macau in a joint venture with Shun Tak Holdings. This is a major mixed-use development on the waterfront comprising luxury residences, a retail development, the Mandarin Oriental Macau hotel and residences managed by the hotel. Hongkong Land is currently developing The former British Embassy Site in Bangkok with Central Group, a commercial complex in Xinjiekou, Nanjing, and mixed-use waterfront development in Xuhui, Shanghai.

Hongkong Land is also active in the residential markets across Southeast Asia. Hongkong Land has a 100% interest in MCL Land, a Singapore residential developer active also in Malaysia. Hongkong Land is also developing residences in Indonesia, the Philippines, Vietnam and Thailand.

Hongkong Land has also developed residential properties and mixed-use projects in mainland China. In Beijing, there are residential projects such as Central Park and Maple Place. Hongkong Land has more than 10 developments in Chongqing, such as Yorkville, Bamboo Grove and Landmark Riverside. In Chengdu, it is developing WE City, a mixed-use residential and commercial development. In Shanghai, Hongkong Land has developed Parkville in Pudong, Shanghai, for residential and commercial use. The company has recently entered Nanjing, Hangzhou and Wuhan to develop residential/mixed-use properties.

== History ==
=== Founding ===
Hongkong Land was formed on 2 March 1889 and was initially named The Hongkong Land Investment and Agency Company Limited. It was founded by two businessmen in Hong Kong — Sir Paul Chater and James Johnstone Keswick. Besides property, Chater was also known for his interests in brokerage and bullion while Keswick was Tai-pan of Jardine, Matheson and Company Limited.

Chater had been lobbying for some time in government circles for a new reclamation project in the Victoria District in Central Hong Kong and the construction of a new Praya along the harbour front. Six days after the formation of Hongkong Land, he got his way. The reclaimed land was to yield an area of 65 acres (260,000 m^{2}) of building land some 250 feet (76 m) wide along a new waterfront road that came to be known as Chater Road. This "Central Reclamation" has since become a core element of Hong Kong's Central District, forming as it does the land between today's Des Voeux Road Central and Connaught Road Central, including Statue Square and Chater Road itself.

The four-storey New Oriental Building was the first commercial building on the Central Reclamation built on Marine Lot 278 at No. 2 on the then newly formed Connaught Road and completed in 1898. This building was demolished in the early 1960s and the site is today occupied by the AIA Central building. The Chater Road reclamation can thus be seen as the starting point for Hongkong Land's development of "Central" as Hong Kong's business district.

=== Early years ===
Following the construction of The New Oriental Building, between June 1904 and December 1905, Central saw the completion of five major buildings that were Hong Kong's first 'skyscrapers'. These included the Alexandra Building in 1904, which was built on the location of today's Alexandra House.

By 1941 the company possessed 13 properties in Central. One of the most notable among them was Marina House, Alexandra Building, Holland House, Queen's Building and Prince's Building.

Hongkong Land ceased business for three years and eight months during the Second World War. But when the company reclaimed its office buildings in September 1945, they were all in good structural condition.

The first post-war project came in 1947, adding three more floors to the five-storey Marina House. Then came the redevelopment of 11 and 13 Queen's Road Central into the nine-storey Edinburgh House, which was completed in 1950. These buildings stood on the sites of today's Edinburgh Tower and York House.

At the same time, three old buildings on a triangular site formed by Des Voeux Road, Chater Road and Ice House Street — Alexandra Building, Royal Building and Chung Tin Building — were demolished to make way for the 13-storey Alexandra House.

=== 1960s and 1970s ===
By the mid-1960s, Hongkong Land owned nine office blocks as well as the shopping complex in Prince's Building and The Mandarin Hotel. These were connected by the first pedestrian bridge. Since then, Hongkong Land's buildings have been linked to one another, forming a network of commercial buildings.

During the 1970s, the company began investing in international markets, building a portfolio of properties in Australia, Hawaii, Indonesia, Malaysia, Singapore and Thailand.

The Group Chief Executive Vernon Robert's leadership during this period was the construction of the Connaught Centre. On 1 June 1970, the company paid a then world-record price of HK$258 million at a public auction for an important new central reclamation site. On completion in 1973, the 52-level, 696,000 square feet (64,700 m^{2}) Connaught Centre was Hong Kong's largest and most advanced office block. It was renamed Jardine House on 1 January 1989.

Redevelopment during the 1970s of Hongkong Land's "Central" portfolio began with the demolition of Alexandra House and the construction of what was to be the third building to bear that name on the site. The 36-level project, which was finished in 1976, was joined by Prince's Building, Swire House, The Mandarin Hotel and Connaught Centre by overhead walkways. Today, it forms a footbridge network connecting Hongkong Land's commercial portfolio.

Hongkong Land developed residential properties in mid-levels, including May Tower in 1974 and Branksome in 1976. The company also acquired a tract of land in Pok Fu Lam and started construction of the Chi Fu Fa Yuen complex. This consisted of 20 towers with 4,258 flats, along with a shopping centre, restaurants and recreational facilities.

=== 1980s and 1990s ===
The 1980s saw Hongkong Land diversify from its usual property interests, as it bought significant shareholdings in Hong Kong Telephone Company Ltd and Hong Kong Electric Holdings Ltd.

In 1982, Hongkong Land acquired the last major site available in Central with a bid of HK$4.7 billion and began construction of the first phase of Exchange Square. It was the largest commercial complex in the territory at the time and the most technologically sophisticated.

The year 1982 saw the property market in Hong Kong plunge dramatically, and in the following two years, rentals halved. This was a period of financial difficulty for Hongkong Land as it looked to reorganise itself and reduce its debt burden through asset disposals and restructuring measures. Hongkong Land sold its international properties as well as its non-core assets in Hong Kong, including its interests in Hong Kong Telephone and Hong Kong Electric. But its core assets in the heart of Central were left untouched.

In 1984 the property market began to look up again and in late 1985, Hongkong Land completed and opened the first phase of its new flagship property, One and Two Exchange Square. In 1988, the final third phase of Exchange Square was completed and The Forum was opened.

The Landmark was completed in two phases in 1980 and 1983. It comprised two 47-level office blocks, Gloucester Tower and Edinburgh Tower, and a large five-level shopping podium.

During the 1990s, Hongkong Land continued to enhance its core commercial office portfolio in Hong Kong, while beginning to look at investment opportunities in other Asian cities.

In Hong Kong, Central office space supply increased substantially in the late 1990s and in 1997 the company launched the redevelopment of Swire House, now named Chater House, as a world-class building in the heart of Central.

In Singapore, the company began the construction of One Raffles Link, an office building in the centre of the city that was an early example of sustainable construction. The building was completed in 2000.

== Buildings ==
=== Investment Properties ===
Hongkong Land is a major landlord in the Central Business Districts of Hong Kong, Singapore, Jakarta and has a presence in other Asian cities, including:

Hong Kong

- Alexandra House
- Chater House
- One, Two and Three Exchange Square
- The Forum
- Jardine House
- The Landmark
- Edinburgh Tower
- Gloucester Tower
- York House
- Prince's Building

Macau

- One Central Macau
- The Residences and Apartments at Mandarin Oriental

Singapore

- One Raffles Link
- CityLink Mall
- One Raffles Quay
- Marina Bay Financial Centre
- Marina Bay Link Mall

Jakarta

World Trade Center Jakarta

- World Trade Centre 1
- World Trade Centre 2
- World Trade Centre 3 (under development)
- World Trade Centre 5 (Wisma Metropolitan I)
- World Trade Centre 6 (Wisma Metropolitan II)

Hanoi

- Central Building
- 63 Ly Thai To

Phnom Penh

- EXCHANGE SQUARE (formerly The Embassy Site)

Bangkok

- Gaysorn
- British Embassy Compound

Beijing

- WF CENTRAL

Shanghai

West Bund Site, Xuhui, Shanghai

In addition, Hongkong Land has several hotel interests, namely The Landmark Mandarin Oriental Hotel, Mandarin Oriental Wangfujing, Beijing and Hyatt Centric The Ring Chengdu (2025).

=== Development Properties ===
Hongkong Land has a significant residential property development business in Asia focusing on developments for sale for the high-and-luxury end of the market, through wholly owned or joint venture projects. Examples of recent residential projects completed or being developed are:
Hong Kong

- The Serenade
- The Sail at Victoria
- Ivy on Belcher's
- Chi Fu Fa Yuen
- Chi Lok Fa Yuen
- Eightland Garden
- Luk Yeung Sun Chuen
- Westlands Gardens
- May Tower One
- Tregunter Towers
- Oriental Gardens

Beijing

- Central Park
- Maple Place at Beijing Riviera

Chengdu

- WE City
- Artisan Bay

Chongqing

- Bamboo Grove
- Central Avenue
- Landmark Riverside
- Yorkville South
- Yorkville North
- Central Avenue
- River One
- Harbour Tale
- Hillview
- The Pinnacle

Hangzhou

- Hangzhou Bay

Nanjing

- Yue City
- JL CENTRAL
- River and City

Shanghai

- Park Mansion

Shenyang

- One Capitol
- One Island

Macau

- One Central Residences

Wuhan

- Dreamland

Indonesia

- Anandamaya Residences
- Nava Park
- Asya
- Arumaya

The Philippines

- Mandani Bay
- NorthPine Land developed residential properties include Greenwoods Village, Wind Crest, Kahaya Place, Forest Ridge, South Hampton and Kohana Grove.
- One Roxas Triangle and Two Roxas Triangle

Singapore

- Marina Bay Residences
- Marina Bay Suites
- MCL Land developed residential properties include Parvis, Hillcrest Villa, Fernhill, Calrose, Metz and Waterfall Gardens. Its recent projects include Sol Acres, LakeVille, Hallmark Residences, and Palms @ Sixth Avenue.
- Margret Ville
- Parc Esta
- Leedon Green

Vietnam

- The Nassim
- The Marq

Thailand

- The Esse Sukhumvit 36
- Lake Legend, Cheangwattana
