= Wheelock House =

Office building in Hong Kong

- 會德豐大廈
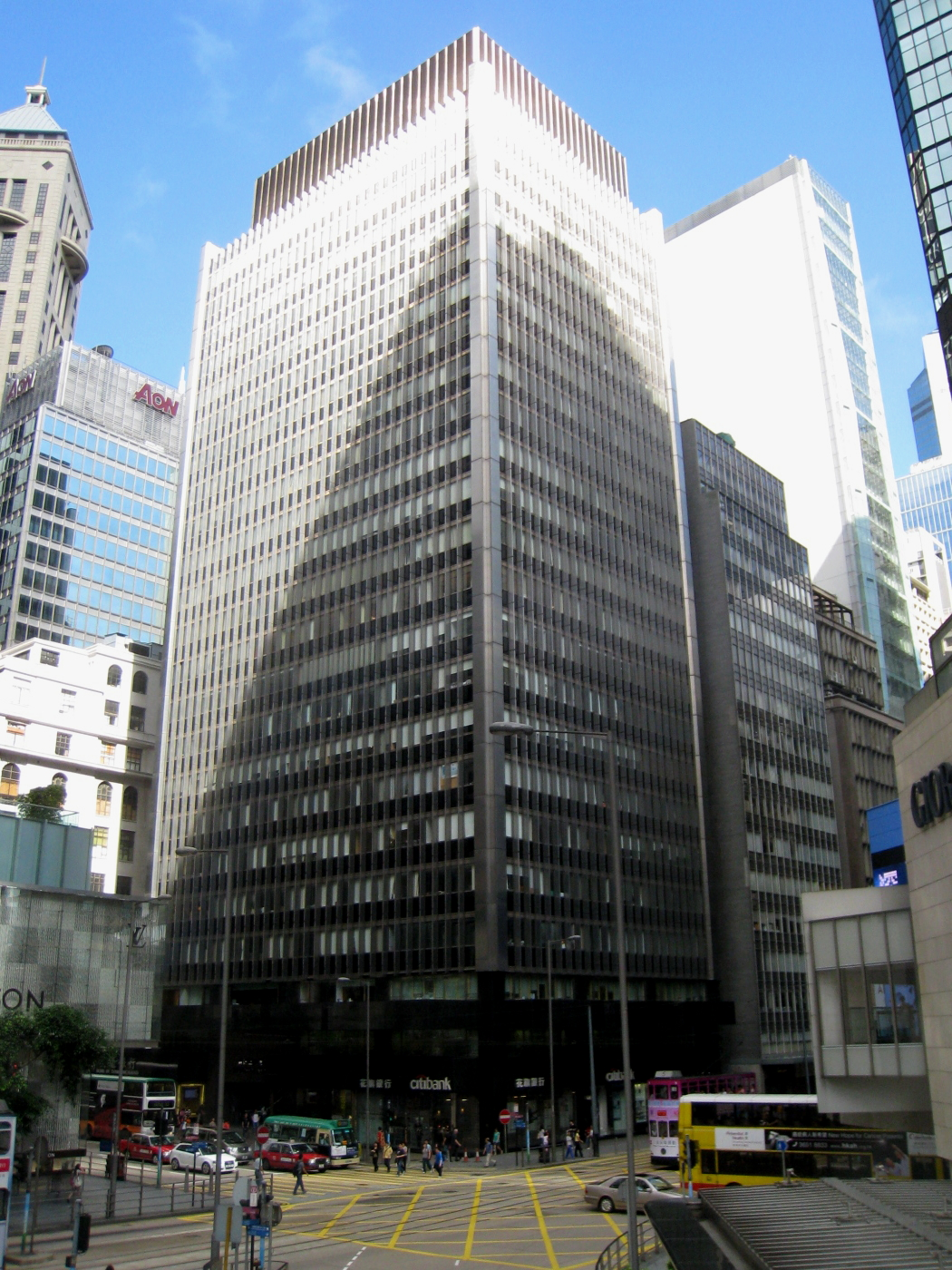
- Wheelock House at the corner of Pedder Street and Des Voeux Road Central.

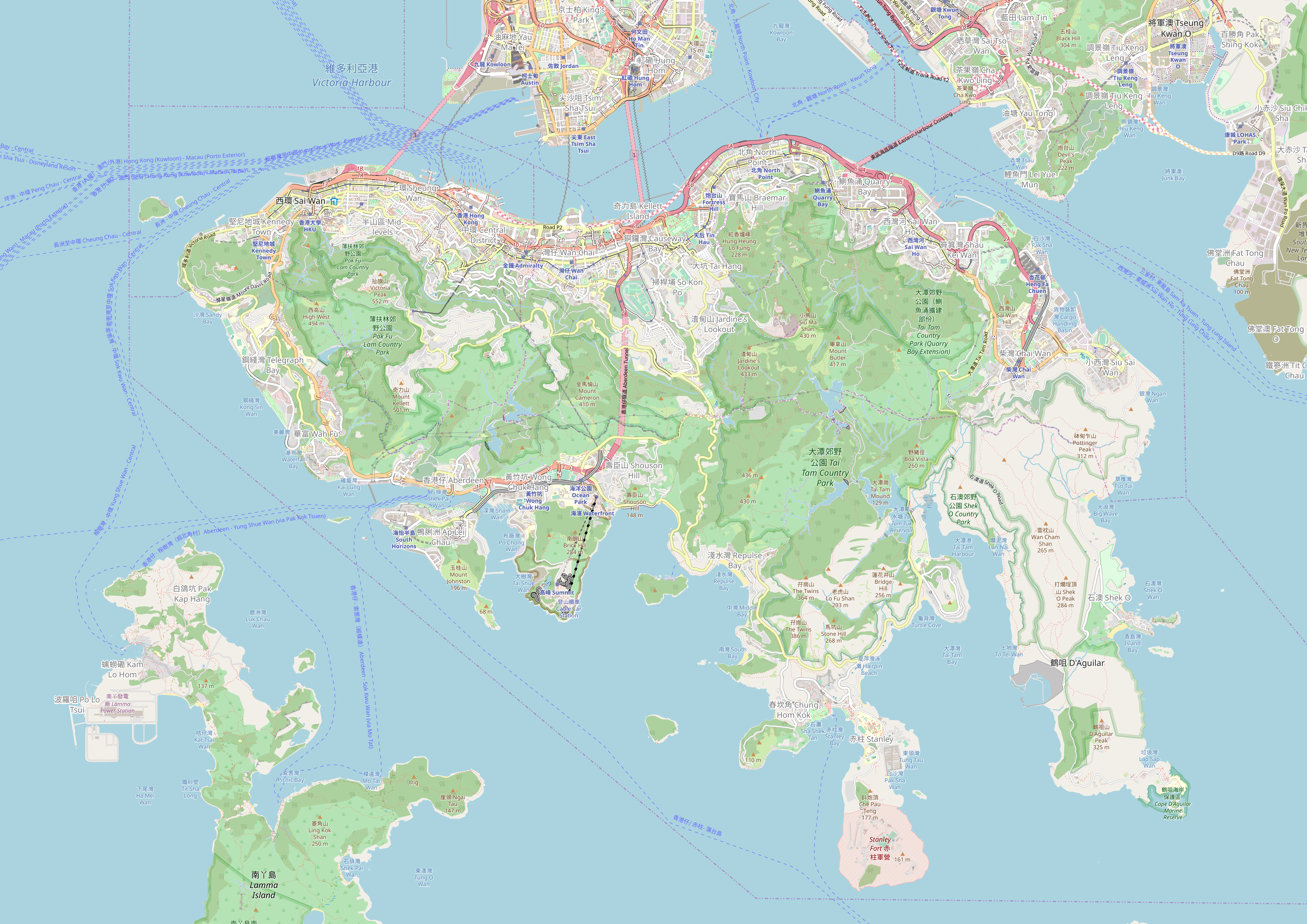
- Location within Hong Kong Island

General information
- Location: Hong Kong
- Coordinates: 22.2819°N 114.1574°E
- Completed: 1984

Technical details
- Floor count: 24

Design and construction
- Architecture firm: Wong & Ouyang (HK) Ltd
- Developer: Cheung Kong Holdings

Wheelock House (Chinese: 會德豐大廈) is a commercial office building located on Pedder Street in Central, Hong Kong. Wheelock House is a Class A office space completed in 1984 and has 24 storeys. One of its architects was Wong & Ouyang (HK) Ltd while the real estate developer was Cheung Kong Holdings.

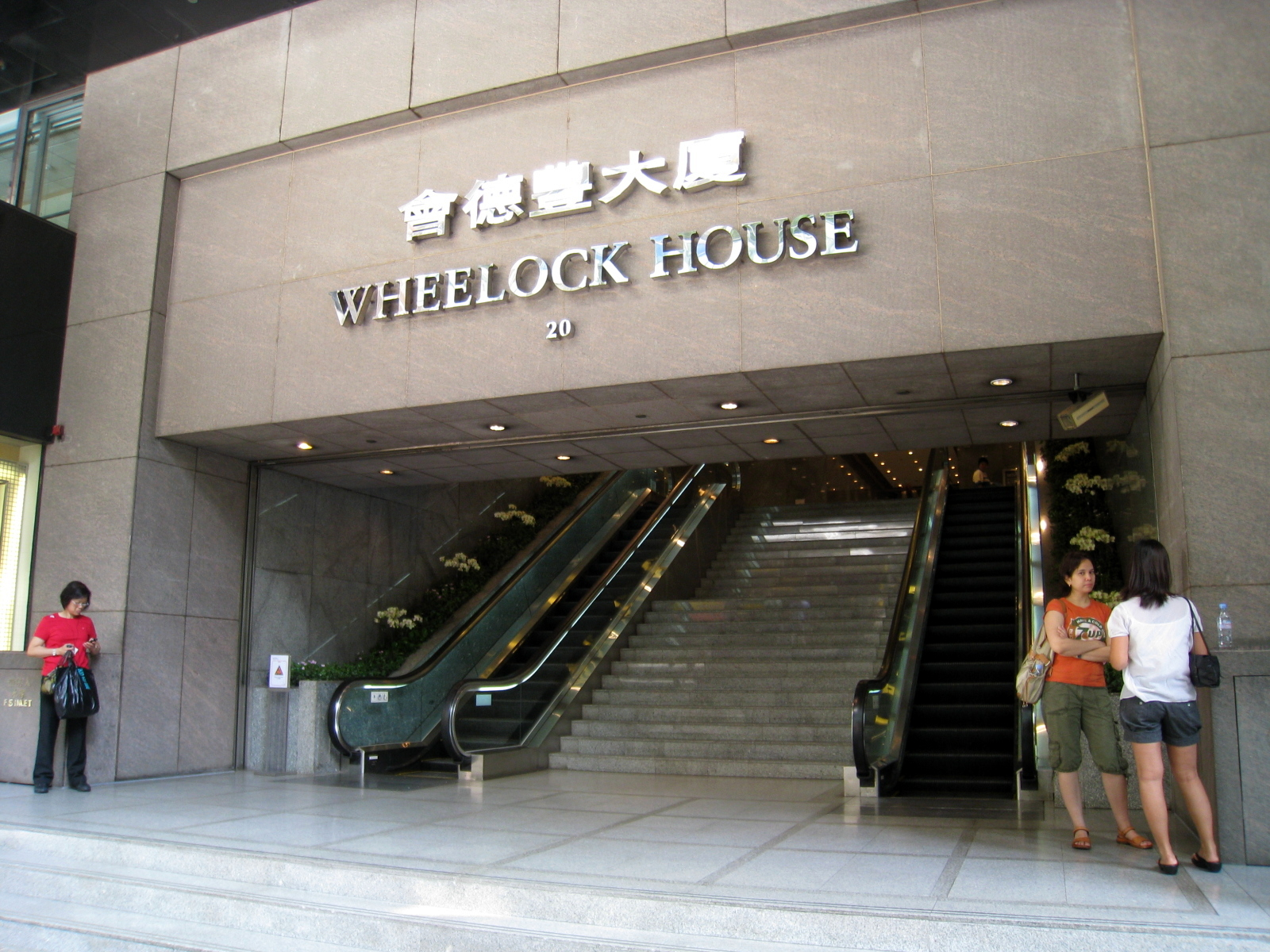
Entrance of Wheelock House on Pedder Street.

== History ==
Wheelock House was built on the site where once stood three previous generations of Jardine House, the headquarters of Jardine, Matheson & Co. The first Jardine House was probably built around 1841 after Jardine's successful bid for its lots on The Praya Central. In 1908, the second Jardine House was built. It was rebuilt in around 1956, and redeveloped in the early 1970s as Wheelock House.

== Nearby ==
- World-Wide House
- The Landmark
- Island line (MTR), Central station (MTR)
- Queen's Road Central
- Lan Kwai Fong
