= Pedder Building =

Coordinates: 22.28188°N 114.1569°E

- 畢打行
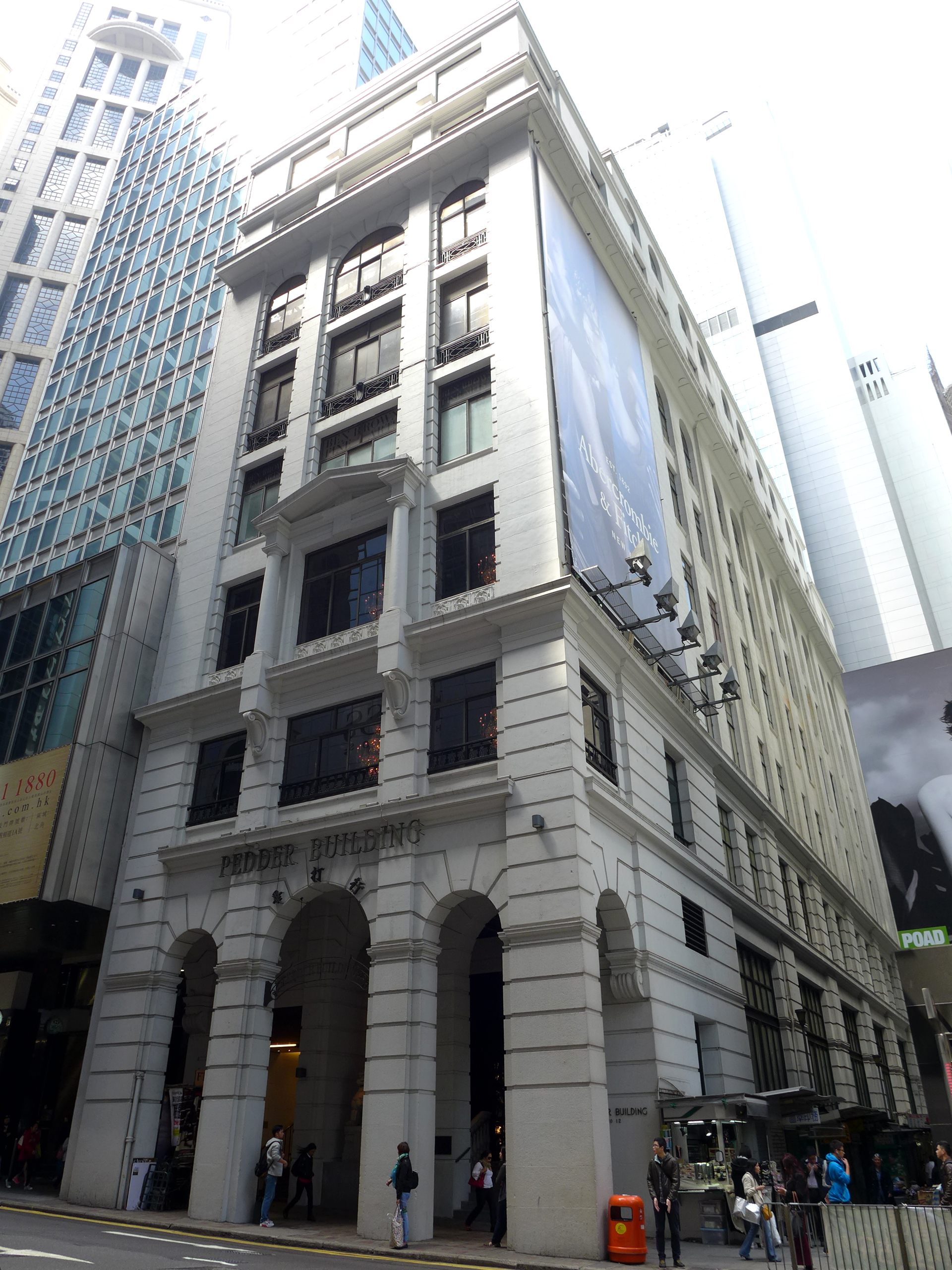
- Pedder Building
- Interactive map of the Pedder Building area

General information
- Type: Private commercial building
- Architectural style: Beaux-Arts style
- Location: Central, No.12 Pedder Street, Hong Kong
- Opened: 1924; 102 years ago
- Owner: Tai Kee Leong Co. Ltd (elsewhere noted as Henry Fok Estates)

Design and construction
- Architecture firm: Palmer and Turner Architects
- Designations

Hong Kong Graded Building – Grade I
- Designated: 10 September 2020; 5 years ago

Pedder Building
- Traditional Chinese: 畢打行
- Simplified Chinese: 毕打行
Transcriptions
Standard Mandarin
- Hanyu Pinyin: Bìdǎ Háng
Yue: Cantonese
- Yale Romanization: Bāt dāa hàahng
- Jyutping: Bat1 daa1 haang4

The Pedder Building, located at No. 12 Pedder Street, in Central, Hong Kong, is a historic commercial building built in the Beaux-Arts style. Built in 1923 (elsewhere noted as 1932), it is the last surviving pre-World War II building in Pedder Street.

The building was known for art galleries, many of whom left after disputes, and for extraordinarily high rent charged to Abercrombie and Fitch, which also vacated due to cost. It is estimated that the building is now over half vacant, with a number of remaining tenants known to be moving to less costly premises. The vacancies have started to make the building known in Central as a “ghost building,” “ghost art building,” and a “haunted building”.

It is listed as a Grade I Historic Building.

== History ==
Designed by Palmer and Turner Architects, the building was completed in 1924, the same year as its neighbours, the China Building (華人行) and the Queen's Theatre, and has always been let for commercial use. The building was originally owned by Mr. So Shek Chung, and passed to Mr. Ng Wah in 1926. In 1962 the property was sold to Tai Kee Leong Co. Ltd, owned by Fok Ying-tung. The building hosted the headquarters of Jebsen & Co. (now Jebsen Group) from 1925 to 1965.

== Heritage value ==
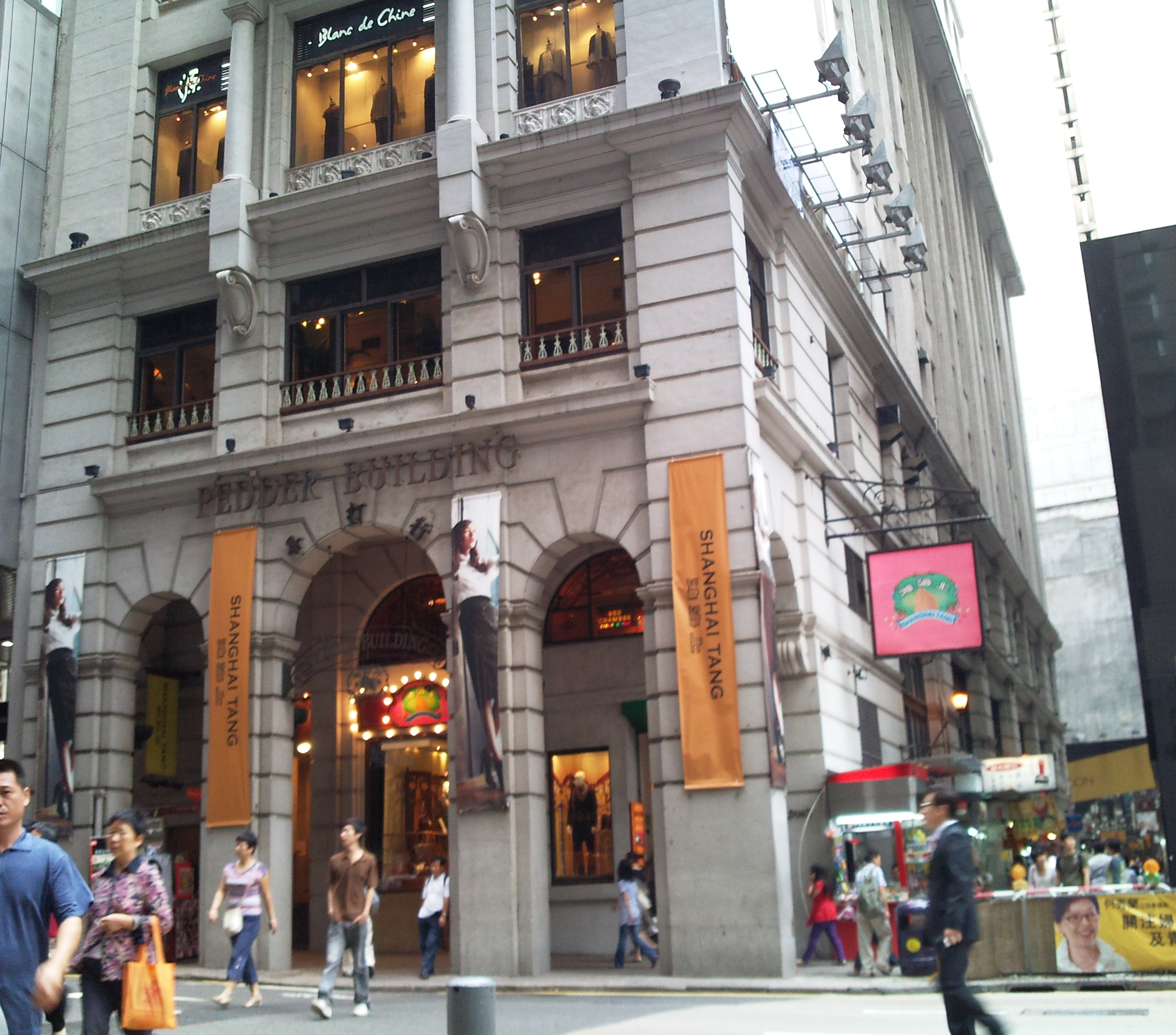
Entrance of Pedder Building (2009)

The Pedder Building is listed as a "Grade II Historic Building" by the Hong Kong Antiquities and Monuments Office (grading awarded in 1981), and was upgraded to Grade I on 10 September 2020.

The building occupies a narrow site of 14 by 50 metres (46 by 164 ft) with an arcade at the front entrance on Pedder Street. It consists of nine storeys plus one mezzanine floor and a basement, and stands 35 metres (115 ft) above street level. The architectural design of the building is typical 1920s office style, with stone cladding on its base and Neo-classical elements such as arches, mouldings, a triangular-shaped pediment, columns and sculpted medallions. The architecture of the building follows a vertical layout, distinguished by a ground-floor on two levels, a mezzanine and four office floors, adorned with an in relief portico, directly above the main entrance, and finally one floor encircled by a balcony surmounted by two neutral levels. It is the oldest commercial edifice in town, and has survived a world war and the better part of a century. There is an intermediate moulding above the three main entrance arches which used to be lined with a row of gargoyle masks flanked on the two ends by two giant bronze figures. However, in 1990, the gargoyles came loose and fell off, and the ornaments were subsequently removed.

Symbolising the colonial history of Hong Kong, the building showcases Hong Kong as an international city, where western and eastern culture merge. Nevertheless, owners Henry Fok Estates have shied from their custodial role of the heritage site, with managing director Ian Fok Chun-wan saying it is becoming harder for owners to conserve heritage buildings because of tight regulations and a lack of incentives or benefits.

== Occupants ==
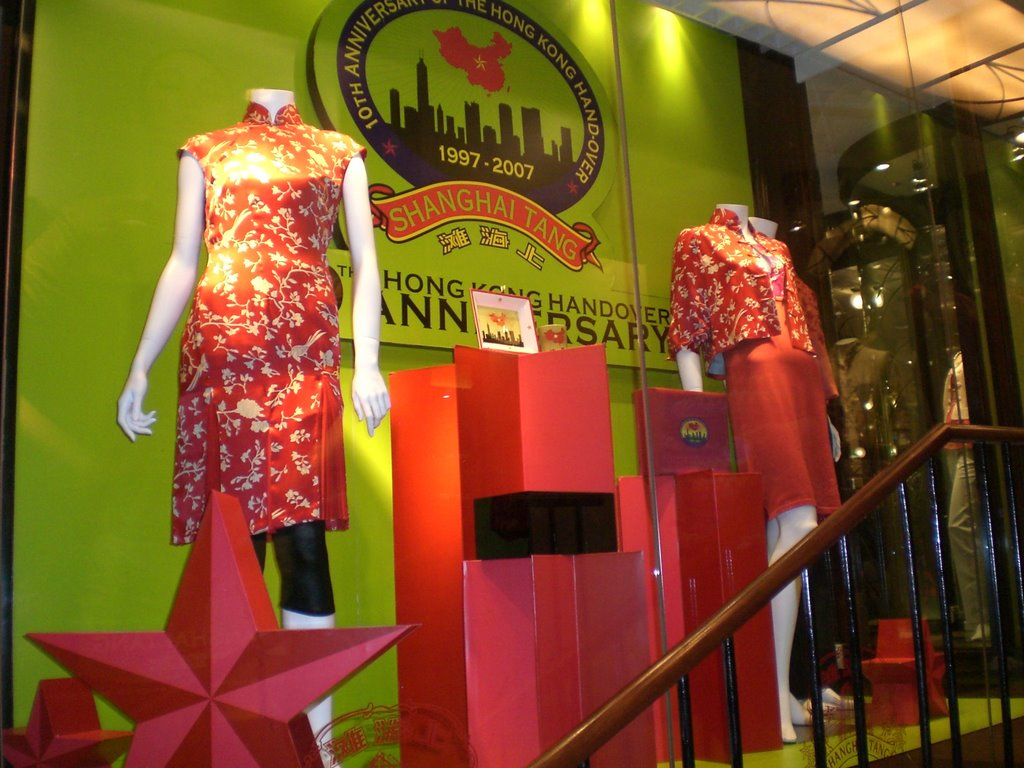
Shanghai Tang shop front on the ground floor

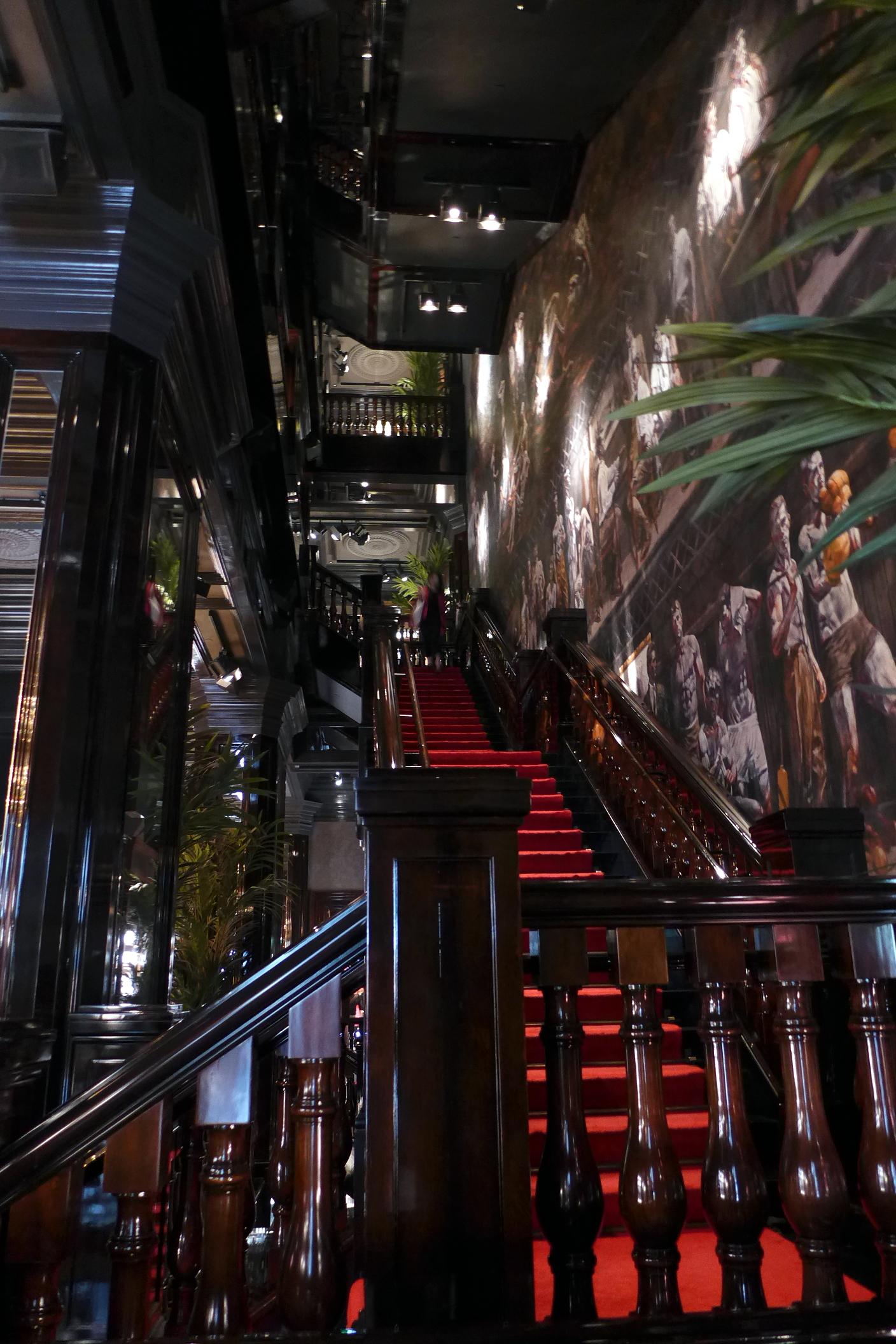
Abercrombie & Fitch shop interior

Occupying the ground floor and basement area of the building, Shanghai Tang was one of the prominent tenants in the building. The shop was founded by a local businessman, David Tang, and it is well known for selling pre-war retro-styled Chinese fashion. Oriental Chinese restaurant China Tee Club, founded in 1986 by former Miss Hong Kong Loletta Chu and her two sisters, is located on the first floor of the building. It used to be members-only but now it serves non-members for dinner.

On the first floor and above there are more than a dozen small stores selling garments, jewellery, fashion and similar. One floor houses a number of clinics.

In July 2011, it was announced that fashion clothing giant Abercrombie & Fitch would take over three main floors and the basement for a new store, ousting Shanghai Tang and the China Tee Club, which closed on 30 September 2011. In October the same year, after 17 years, the 6,300 sq ft (585 m^{2}) flagship Shanghai Tang store closed down, with rising rents cited as the main reason. The landlord was asking for a monthly rental of HK$7 million. US clothing retailer Abercrombie & Fitch reportedly took over the lease for an even higher monthly rent. However, in November 2016, the fashion retailer announced its decision to close down their flagship Hong Kong store, citing strategic review.

To continue its presence in Central, Shanghai Tang set up several project units, namely "Shanghai Tang Loft" on the sixth floor of the Pedder Building, from 23 October to 20 February 2012.

== CBD context ==
Located in the central business district, the Pedder Building is surrounded by skyscrapers and modern architecture. Opposite the building is The Landmark, a mecca of high-street fashion brands and luxury shops. The passage next to the building is filled with local speciality booths including shoe repair, watch repair and a 'chop' maker. In addition, the Pedder Building is part of the Central and Western Heritage Trail on the Central Route, together with other historic buildings and sites such as the Steps and Gas Lamps on Duddell Street nearby.

== Transport ==
The D2 exit of Central MTR station leads to the main entrance of the building. Buses from Mid-Levels, Southern District and Ma On Shan also reach the building. Besides taking MTR and buses, tram and minibus are the other two possible options too. Many minibus routes pass along Pedder Street.
