= Praya Reclamation Scheme =

19th-century land reclamation project in Hong Kong

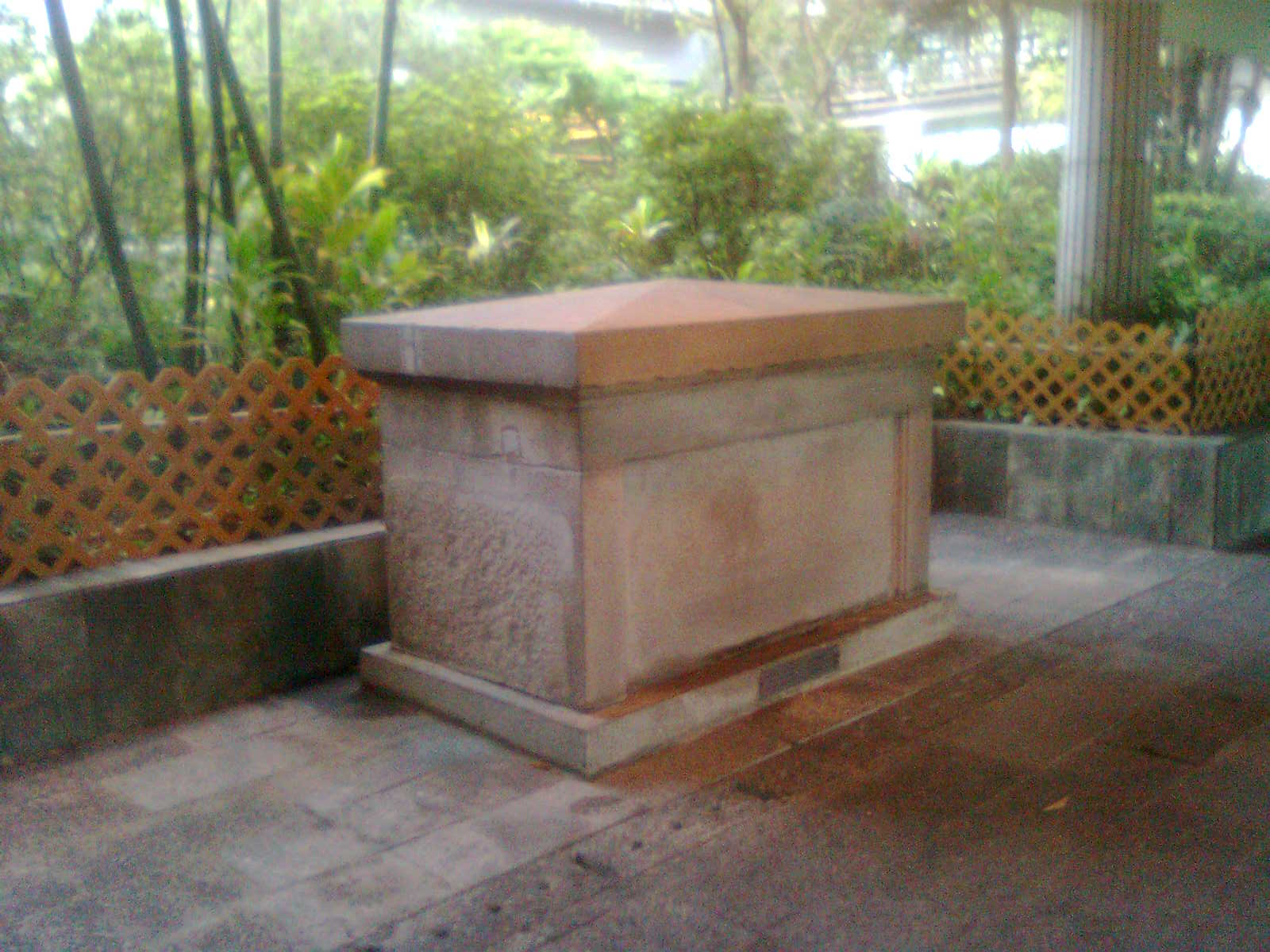
Praya Reclamation foundation stone in Chater Garden. The inscription reads: "This stone was laid by H.R.H. The Duke of Connaught, K.G., K.T., K.P., &c. on the 2nd April 1890 in commemoration of the commencement of the Praya Reclamation Works Sir G. William Des Vœux K.C.M.G., Governor". The stone was originally placed near the fence of the Cricket Club Pavilion. It was dismantled in 1975 and relocated to the present site in 1983.

The Praya Reclamation Scheme (Chinese: 海旁填海計劃) was a large scale land reclamation project carried out by the Hong Kong Land company in 19th Century Hong Kong under Sir Catchick Paul Chater and James Johnstone Keswick.

== Early proposal ==
The project was first proposed in 1855, but many merchants with private piers on the waterfront objected to the scheme.

The first reclamation project eventually began in 1868 and was completed in 1873. It added significant land to Praya Central, which later became present-day Des Voeux Road.

== Second reclamation scheme ==
The second project was revived by the Tai-pan of The Hong Kong and Kowloon Wharf and Godown Company in July 1887. It did not commence until February 1890, and as it was significantly larger than the first, the completion was between 1903 and 1904. There were discrepancies in the number of acres actually gained from the entire project: some sources claimed it added 59 acres (240,000 m^{2}) of land to Hong Kong's Central waterfront and Statue Square, while some indicated that the total area was extended by 65 acres (260,000 m^{2}) using materials with a total weight of 3.5 million tons.

== See also ==
- The Hongs
- Land reclamation in Hong Kong
- Praya East Reclamation Scheme
- Prince's Building
