= The Landmark (Hong Kong) =

Commercial complex in Central, Hong Kong

Coordinates: 22.28118°N 114.15844°E

Landmark

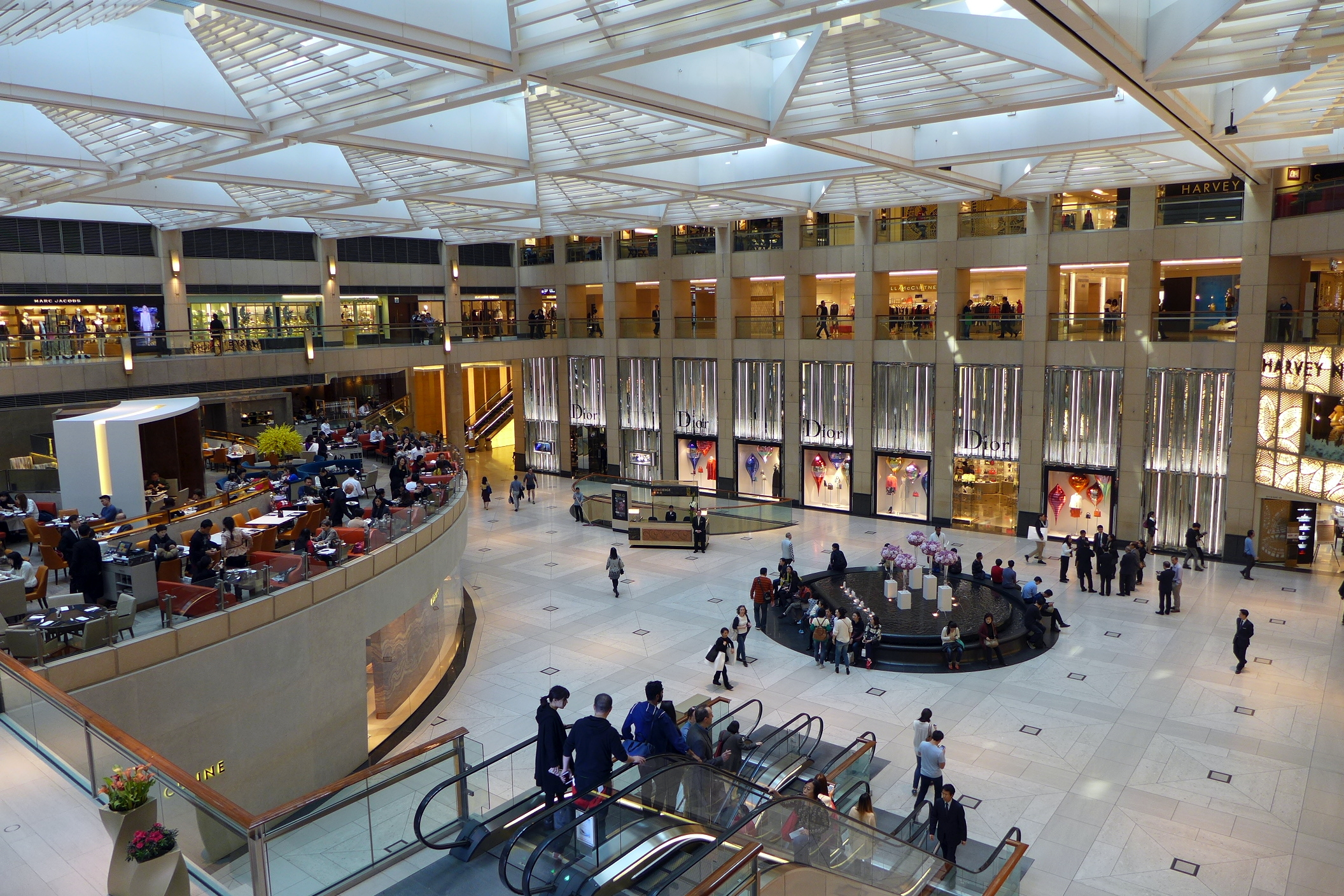
- Cafe Landmark and the atrium of Landmark in January 2015.
- Location: Central, Hong Kong
- Developer: Hongkong Land
- Manager: Hongkong Land
- Owner: Hongkong Land
- Public transit: Central

The Landmark
- Traditional Chinese: 置地廣塲
- Simplified Chinese: 置地广场
Transcriptions
Standard Mandarin
- Hanyu Pinyin: Zhìdì Guǎngcháng
Yue: Cantonese
- Jyutping: Zi3 dei6 gwong2 coeng4

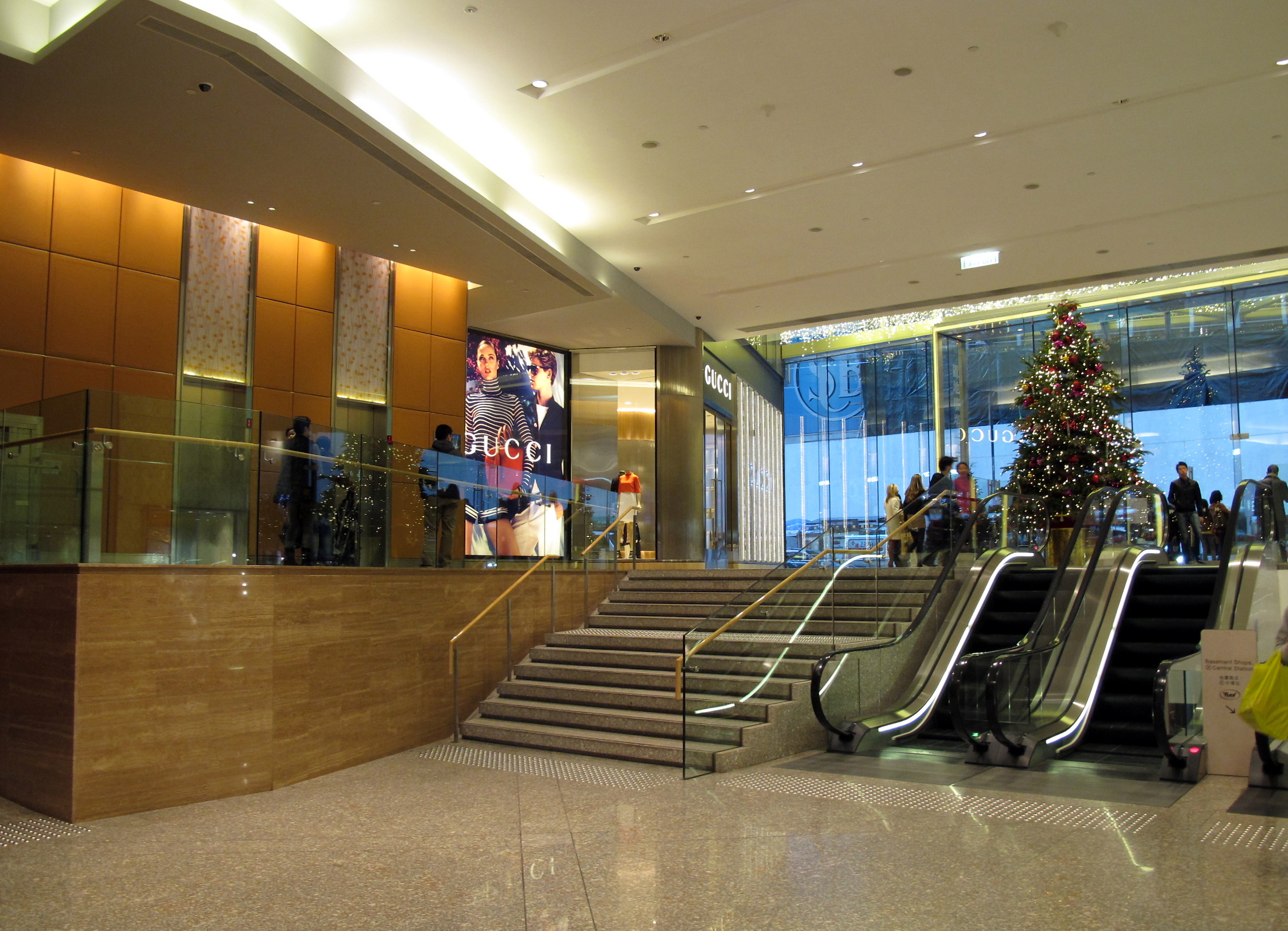
The main entrance of The Landmark on Queen's Road Central in December 2011.

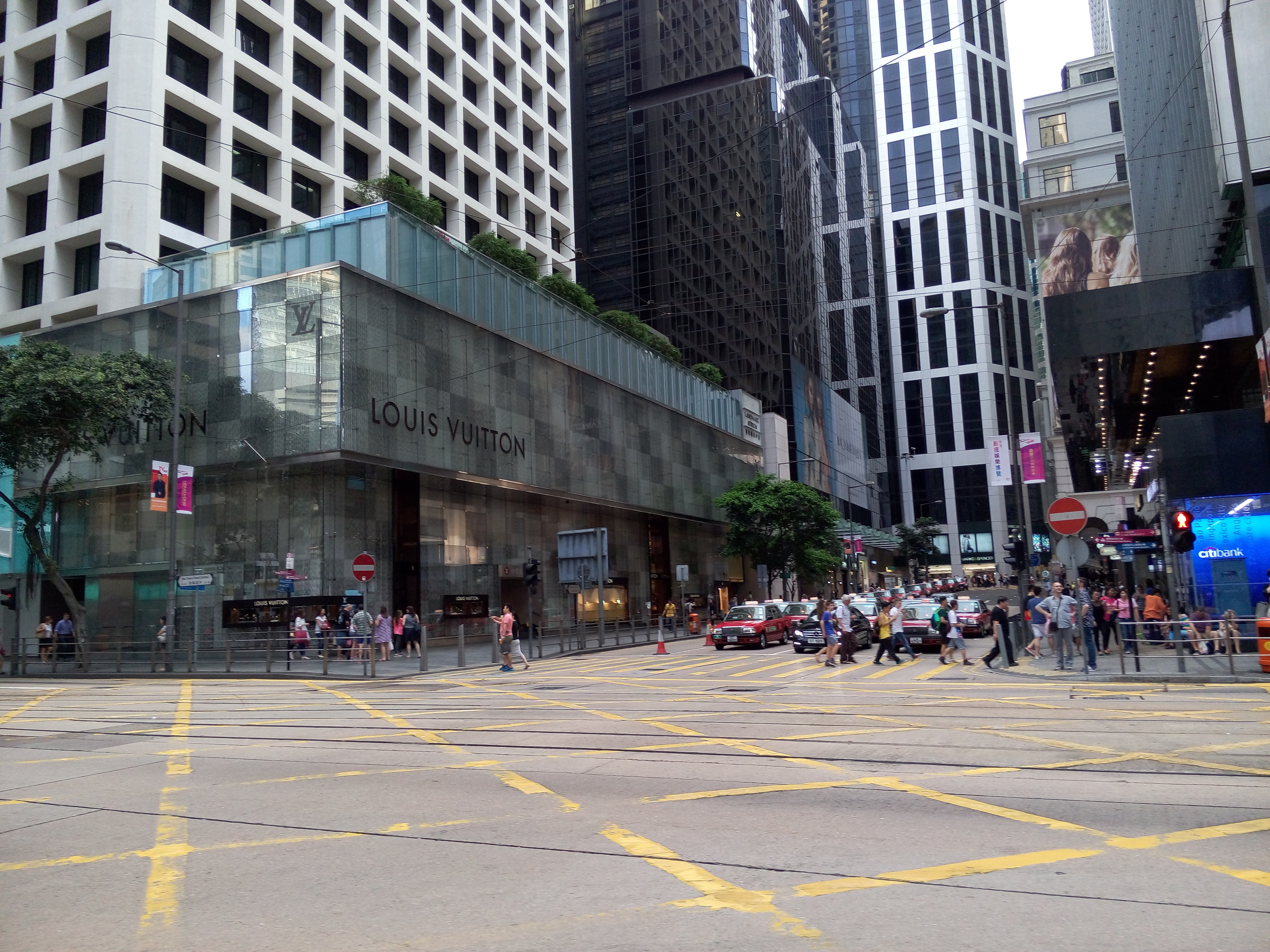
Louis Vuitton store at the base of the northeastern corner of the Landmark, at the intersection of Des Voeux Road Central and Pedder Street in April 2015.

Landmark is a commercial complex owned by Hongkong Land in Central, Hong Kong. It consists of three office towers: Gloucester Tower, Edinburgh Tower and York House. Its retail podium, Landmark Atrium, forms the core component of the LANDMARK shopping mall.

The Landmark Mandarin Oriental Hotel is in the lower floors of Edinburgh Tower, directly linked to the retail floors of Landmark Atrium.

== History ==
It is partly built on the site of the former Hong Kong Hotel, which was in its day the best known hotel on Hong Kong Island. In the 1970s, Hongkong Land started the development of the Landmark under its Central Redevelopment Scheme. The first phase of the project was completed in the late 1970s and the whole project was completed in 1983.

When the development was completed in 1983, the development consisted of a series of levels of shops surrounding a large central atrium with two office towers on top, known as Edinburgh Tower and Gloucester Tower respectively, and an annex building, known as Landmark East.

In 2003, Part of Edinburgh Tower was converted into The Landmark Mandarin Oriental Hotel, a boutique hotel.

== Recent development ==
In 2002, Hongkong Land announced a 1 billion dollar plan—The Landmark Scheme—to renovate The Landmark. The whole scheme included extending the existing shopping atrium to 3/F and 4/F of the building, introducing a department store Harvey Nichols and a hotel The Landmark Mandarin Oriental Hotel, and the redevelopment of The Landmark East into a new 14-floor office tower named York House. The scheme was completed in October 2006 with the opening of York House. To expand and upgrade the Landmark's retail offerings, architects Aedas and Kohn Pedersen Fox carved out areas in the existing retail atrium for several two-story flagship stores and added two new retail floors. A wall of folded glass panels envelopes the retail podium.

In early 2012, Hongkong Land launched a new brand "LANDMARK" for its retail portfolio in Central, covering its four interconnected shopping arcades at The Landmark, Alexandra House, Chater House and Prince's Building. The retail complex of the Landmark was subsequently branded as LANDMARK ATRIUM. At the same time, The Landmark (the complex) itself was renamed as Landmark.

== Notable tenants ==
Landmark is home to many leading law firms and barristers' chambers:

- Skadden, Arps, Slate, Meagher & Flom LLP and Affiliates (42/F Edinburgh Tower)
- Charles Schwab (34/F Gloucester Tower)
- Han Kun Law Offices (43/F Gloucester Tower)
- Goodwin Procter (38/F Edinburgh Tower)
- Gibson, Dunn & Crutcher LLP (32/F Gloucester Tower)
- Jones Day (31/F Edinburgh Tower)
- Squire Patton Boggs (29/F Edinburgh Tower)
- Kirkland & Ellis LLP (26/F Gloucester Tower)
- Herbert Smith Freehills (23/F Gloucester Tower)
- Withers LLP (20/F Gloucester Tower)
- Akin Gump Strauss Hauer & Feld LLP (18/F Gloucester Tower)
- Morgan, Lewis & Bockius LLP (19/F Edinburgh Tower)
- DLA Piper (17/F Edinburgh Tower)
- King & Wood Mallesons (13/F Gloucester Tower)
- Shearman & Sterling LLP (12/F Gloucester Tower)
- Nord Anglia Education (18/F Edinburgh Tower)
- NBC Financial Markets (19/F York House)

== See also ==
- Hongkong Land
- Alexandra House
- Prince's Building
- Chater House
- L'Atelier de Joël Robuchon (Hong Kong)
