= World-Wide Plaza =

World-Wide Plaza may refer to:

- World-Wide Plaza, a shopping centre on 3 levels of World-Wide House, Hong Kong
- One Worldwide Plaza, a high-rise building in New York, U.S.
