= Central Elevated Walkway =

Extensive footbridge network in Hong Kong

- Traditional Chinese: 中區行人天橋
- Simplified Chinese: 中区行人天桥
- Literal meaning: Central District Pedestrian Bridge
Transcriptions
Standard Mandarin
- Hanyu Pinyin: zhōngqū Xíngrén Tiānqiáo
Yue: Cantonese
- Yale Romanization: Jūng kēui hàhng yàhn tīn kìuh
- Jyutping: Zung1 keoi1 hang4 jan4 tin1 kiu4

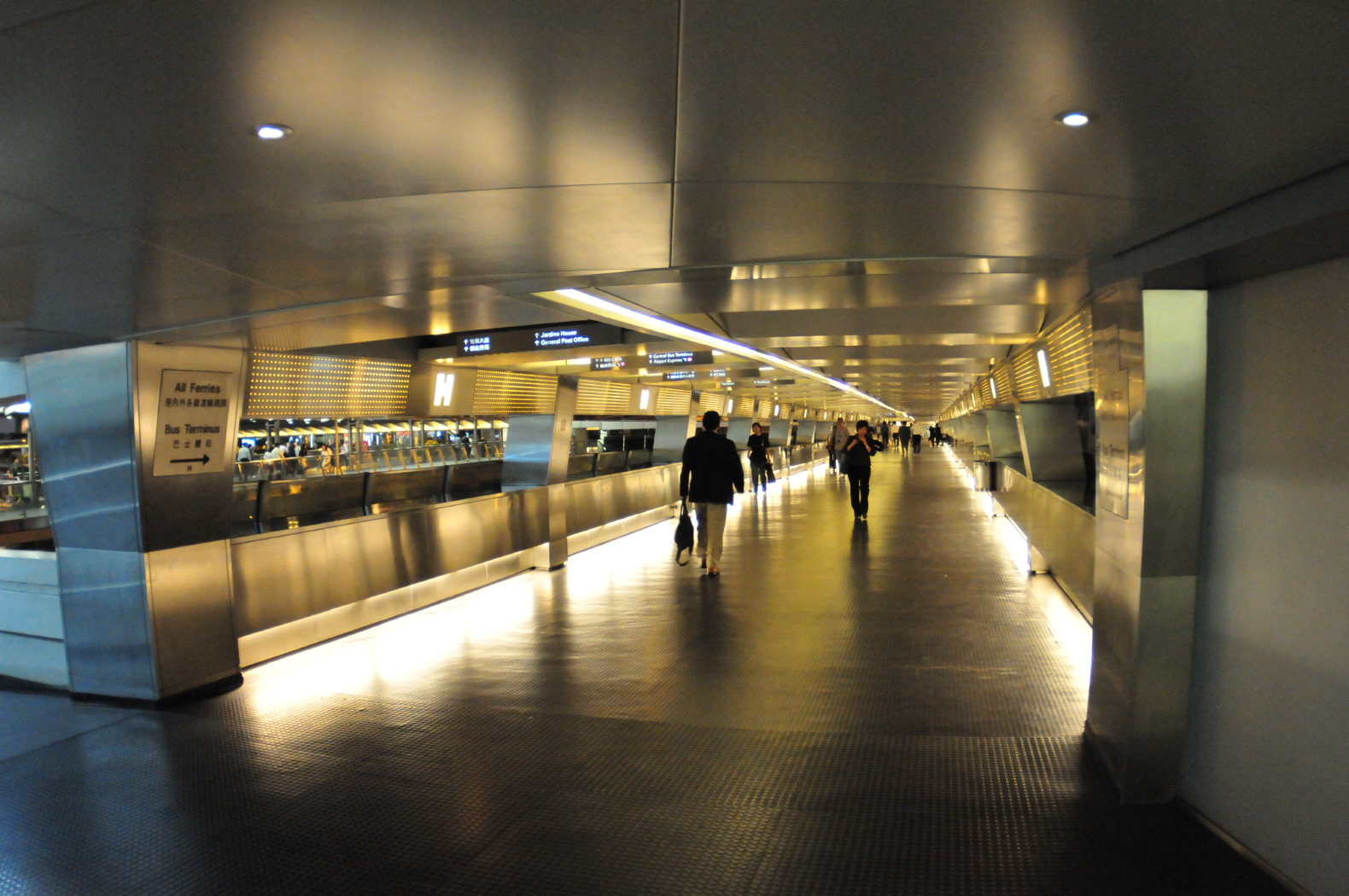
Central Elevated Walkway in Central

The Central Elevated Walkway is an extensive footbridge network spanning Admiralty, Central and parts of Sheung Wan, near Victoria Harbour in Hong Kong.

The system was built in phases by the Hong Kong Government and various developers, such as Hongkong Land, Jardine Matheson Holdings and Shun Tak Holdings. It has escalators and staircases for access. Parts of it are air-conditioned. There is another system in Admiralty that is currently not connected to the Central system.

== History ==
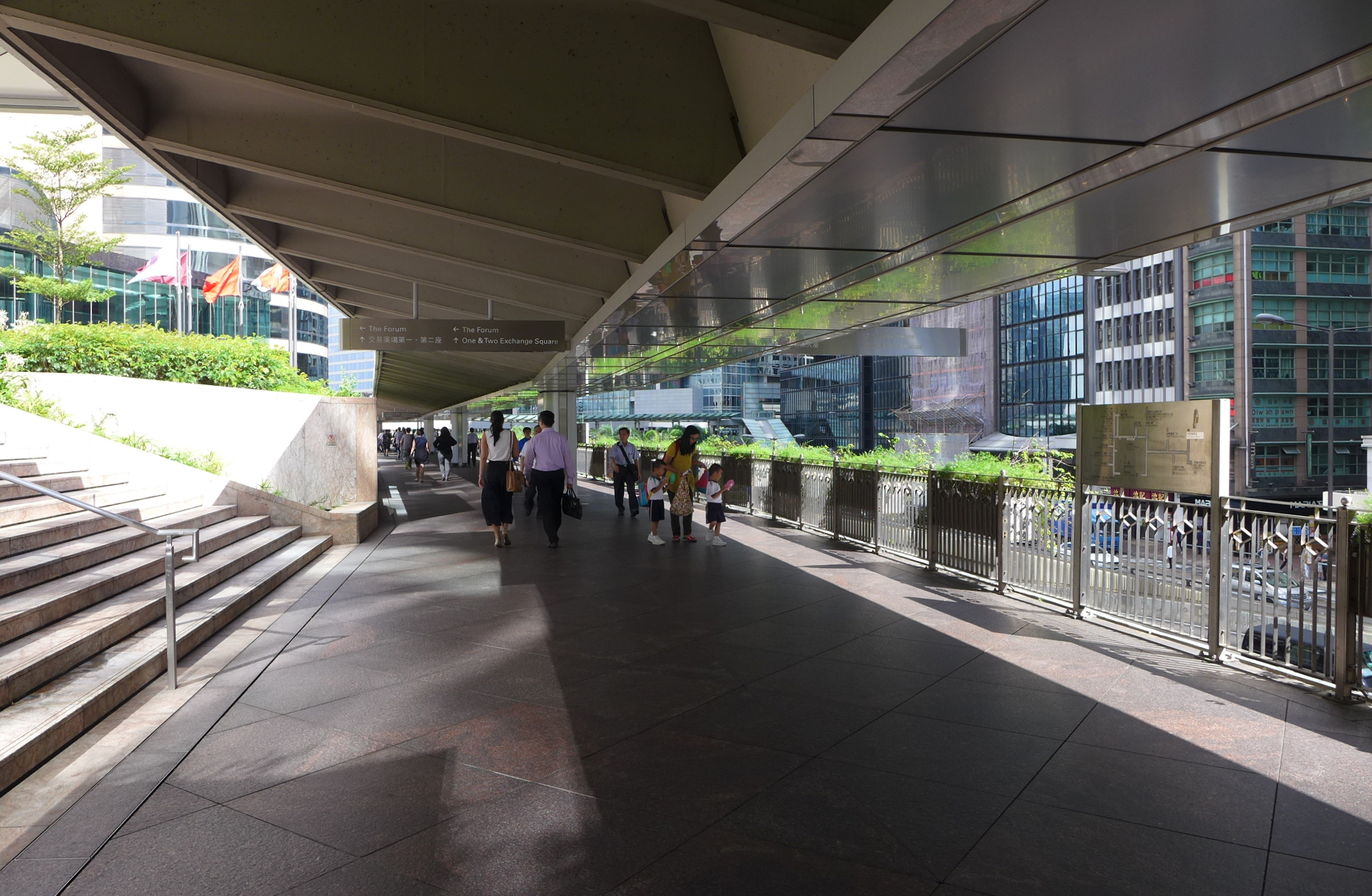
East from Connaught Road

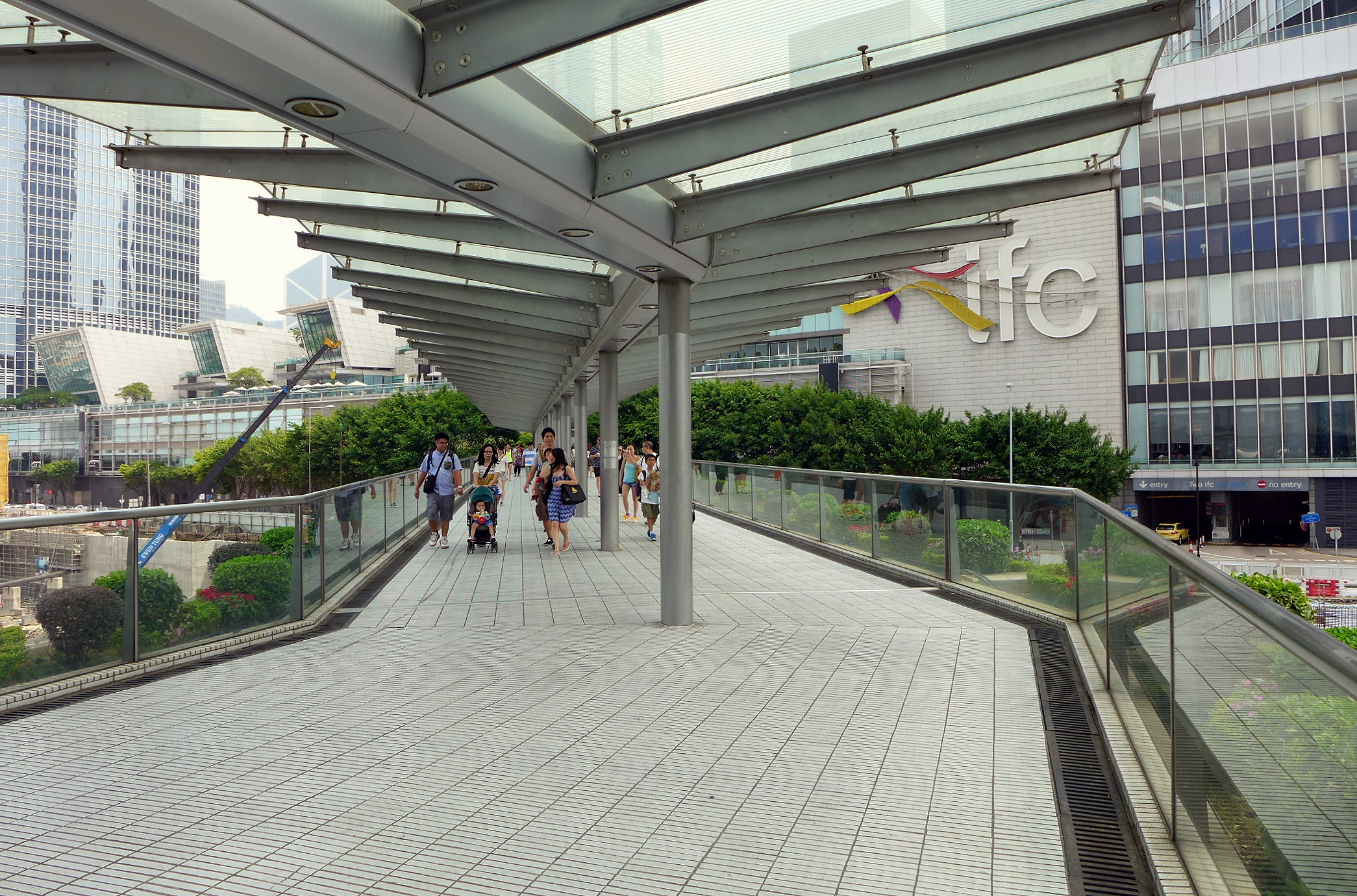
North to Central Piers

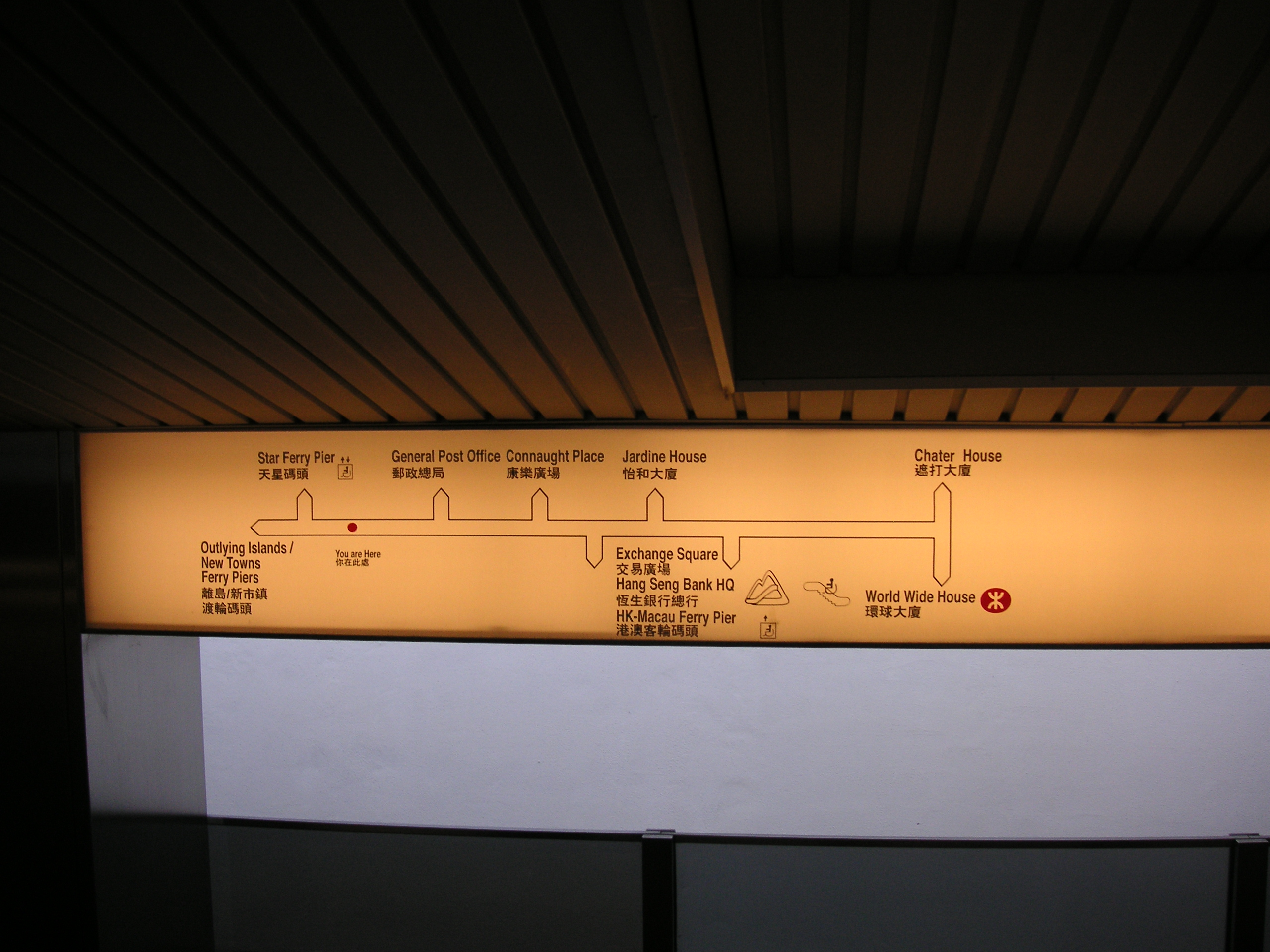
A topological map

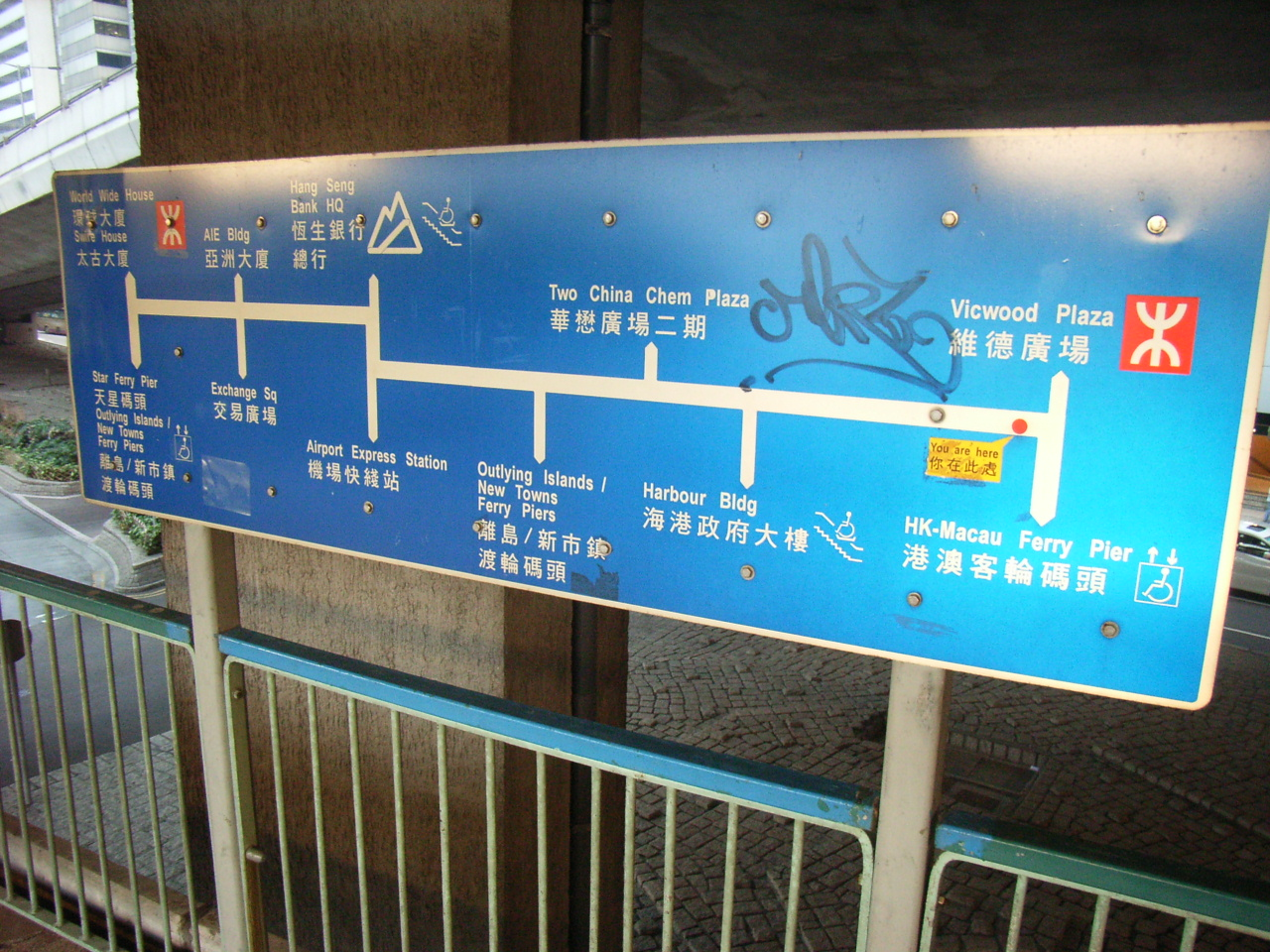
Another map beside the harbour

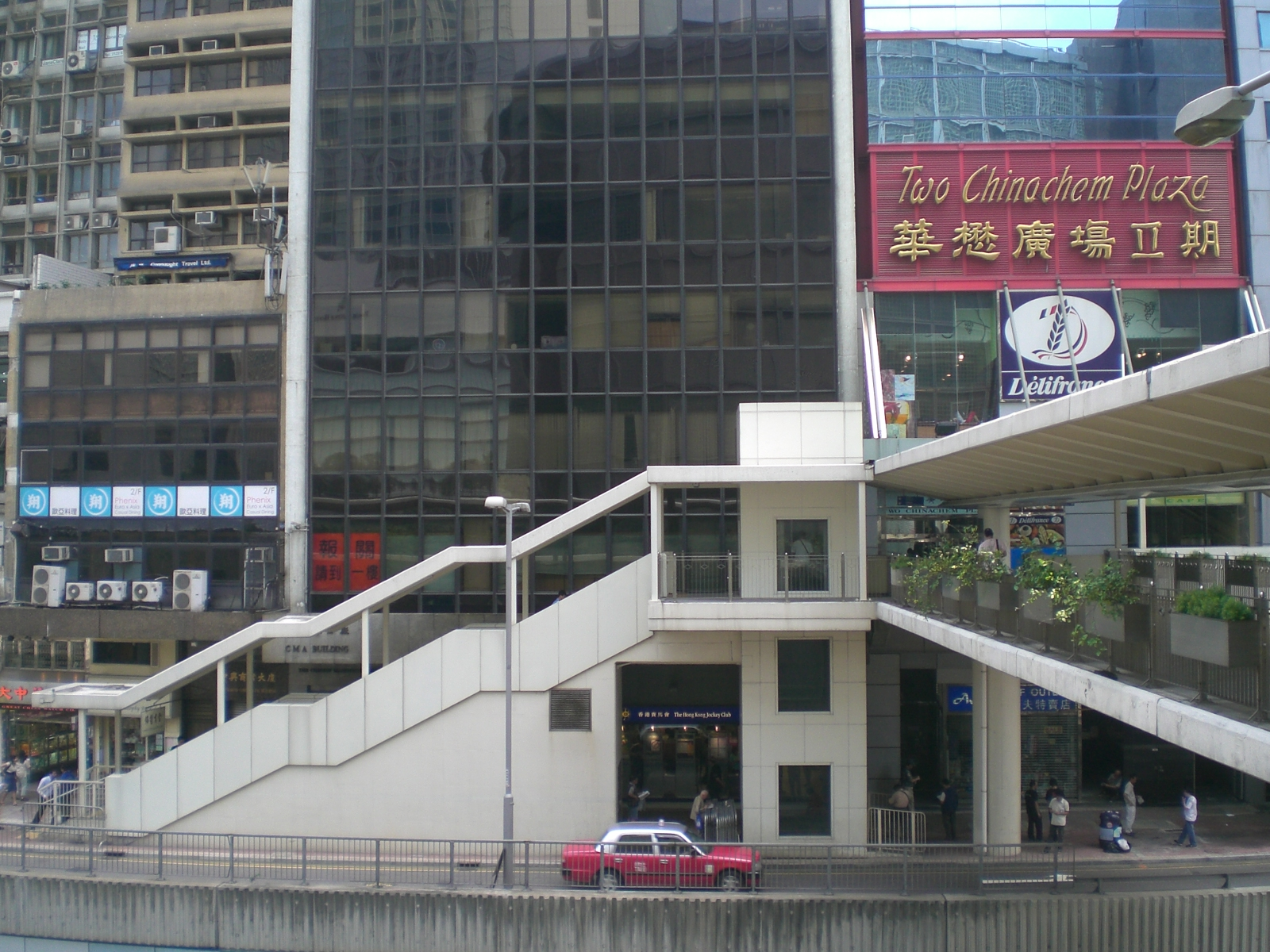
Near Phase 2 of the Chinachem Golden Plaza

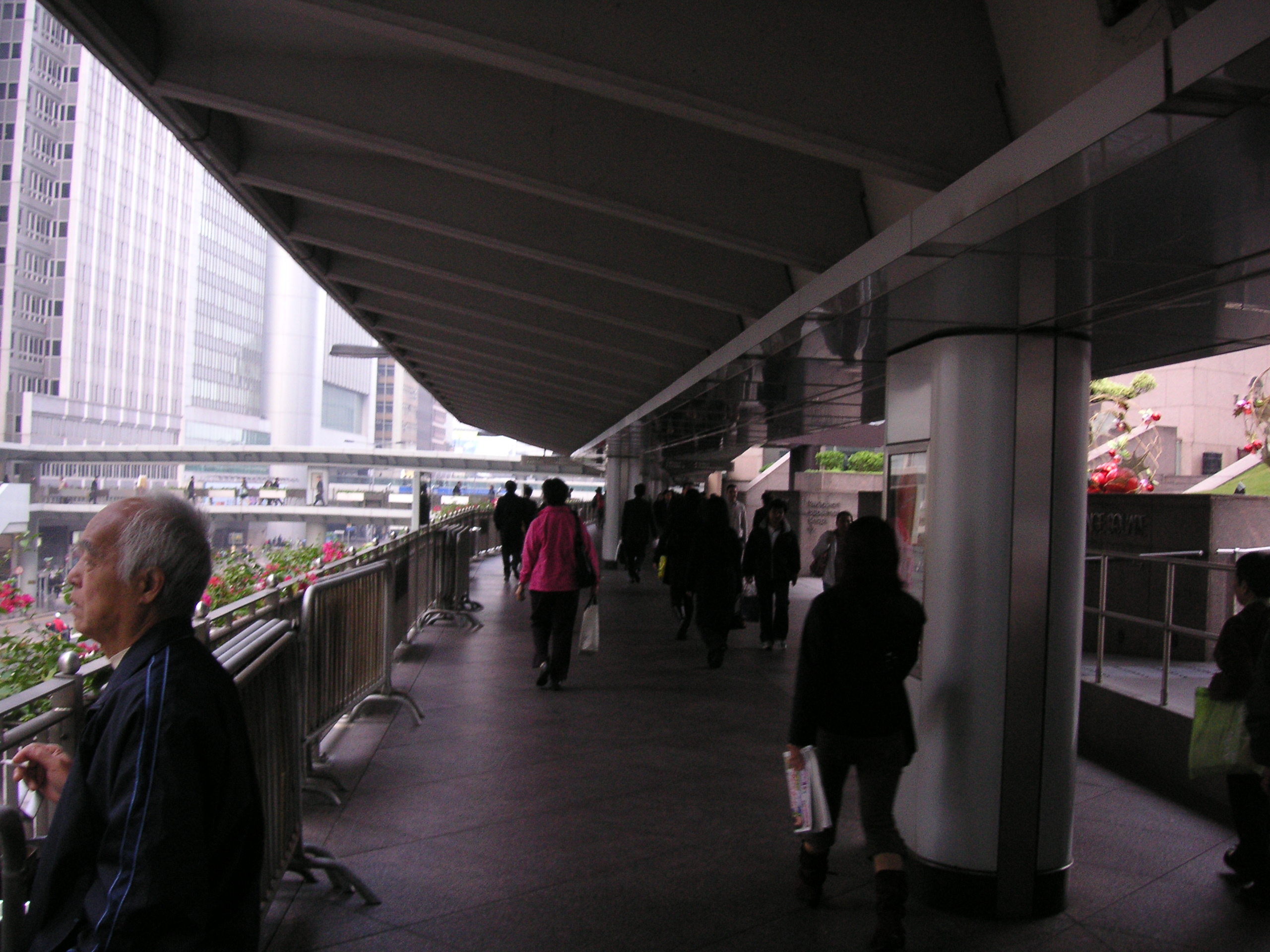
Section near Exchange Square

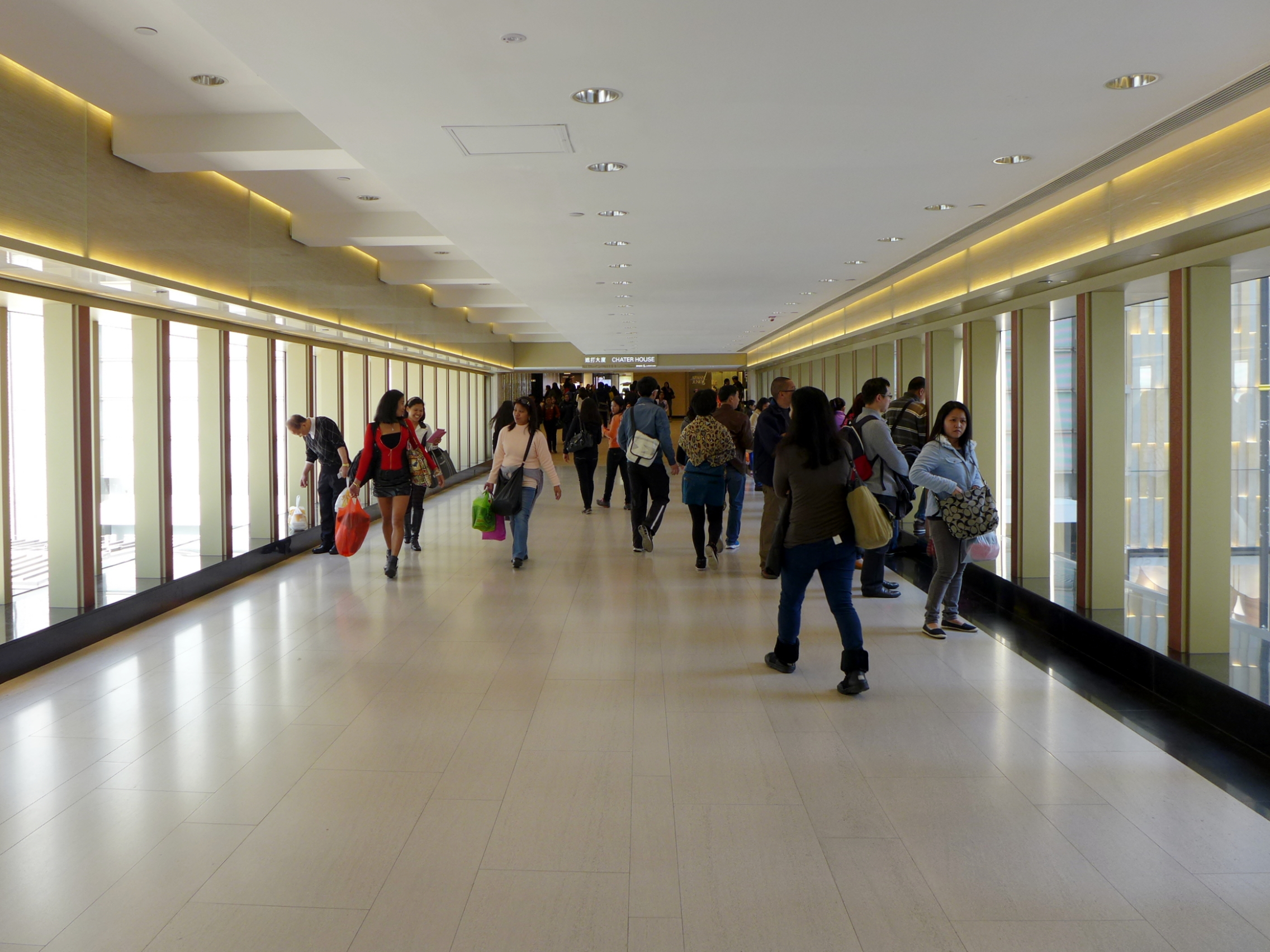
Bridge Access between Alexander House and Chater House

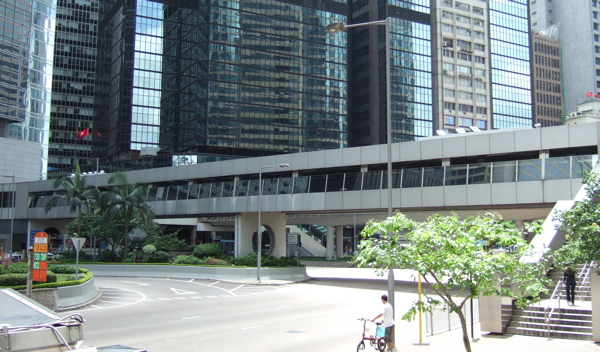
The Central Elevated Walkway, across Connaught Road

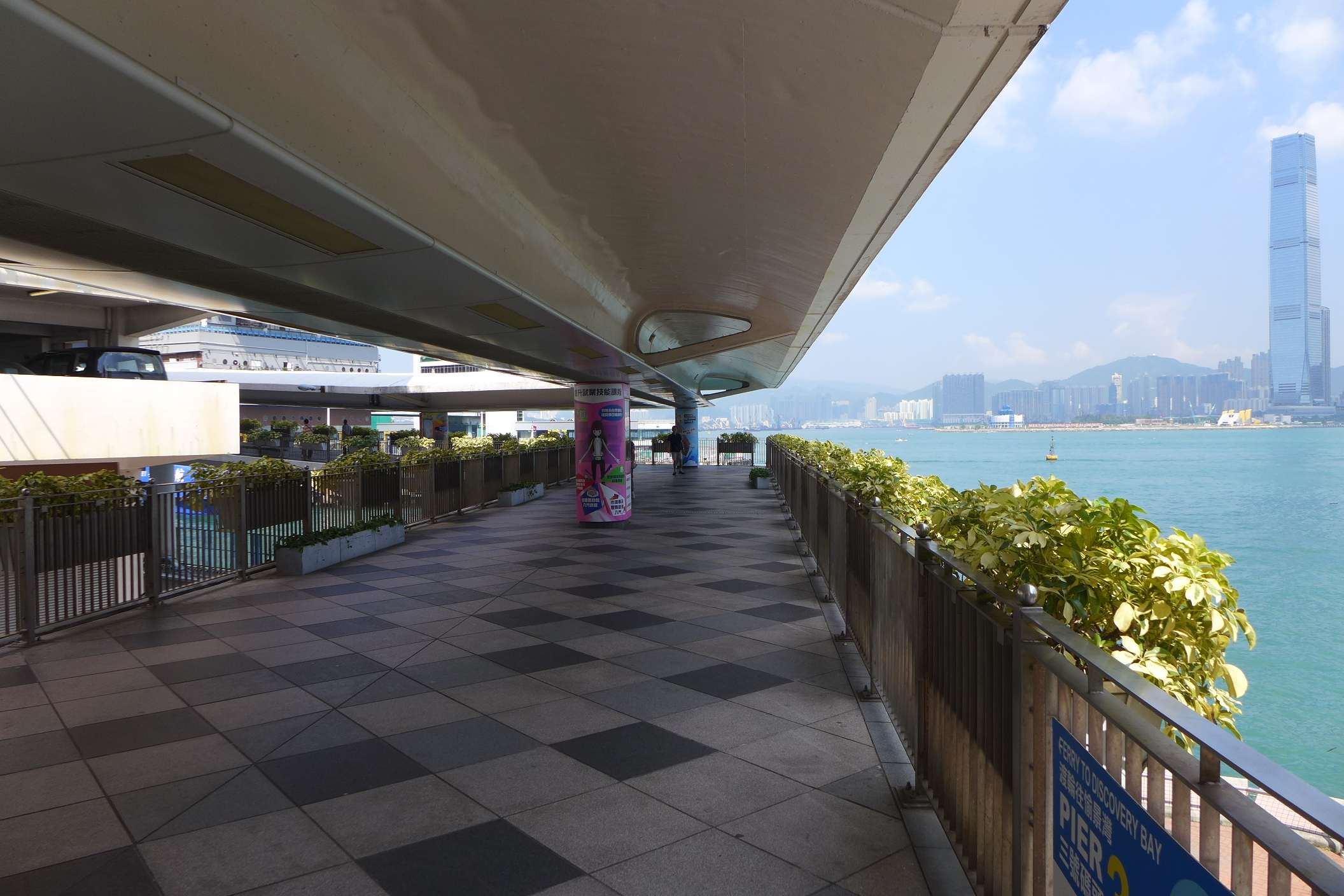
Enjoying the view of Victoria Harbour

In the 1970s, Hongkong Land built a footbridge over Connaught Road to facilitate pedestrian access between Connaught Place (today's Jardine House), Swire House (today's Chater House) and the General Post Office. The developer also built many footbridges between its buildings which were under construction.

In the 1980s, after Exchange Square was completed, the government built a footbridge to connect to Hongkong Land's network; it ran west along the harbourfront to connect Central Piers and Shun Tak Centre. Other buildings along Queen's Road Central, such as Standard Chartered Bank Building and Central Tower, were also connected to the system.

In 1993, the Central–Mid-Levels escalator came into operation, and Hang Seng Bank Building was connected.

In 1998, the International Finance Centre and Airport Express Hong Kong station were completed and brought into the network.

After 2000, the government built a bridge between World-Wide House and Exchange Square.

== Central system ==
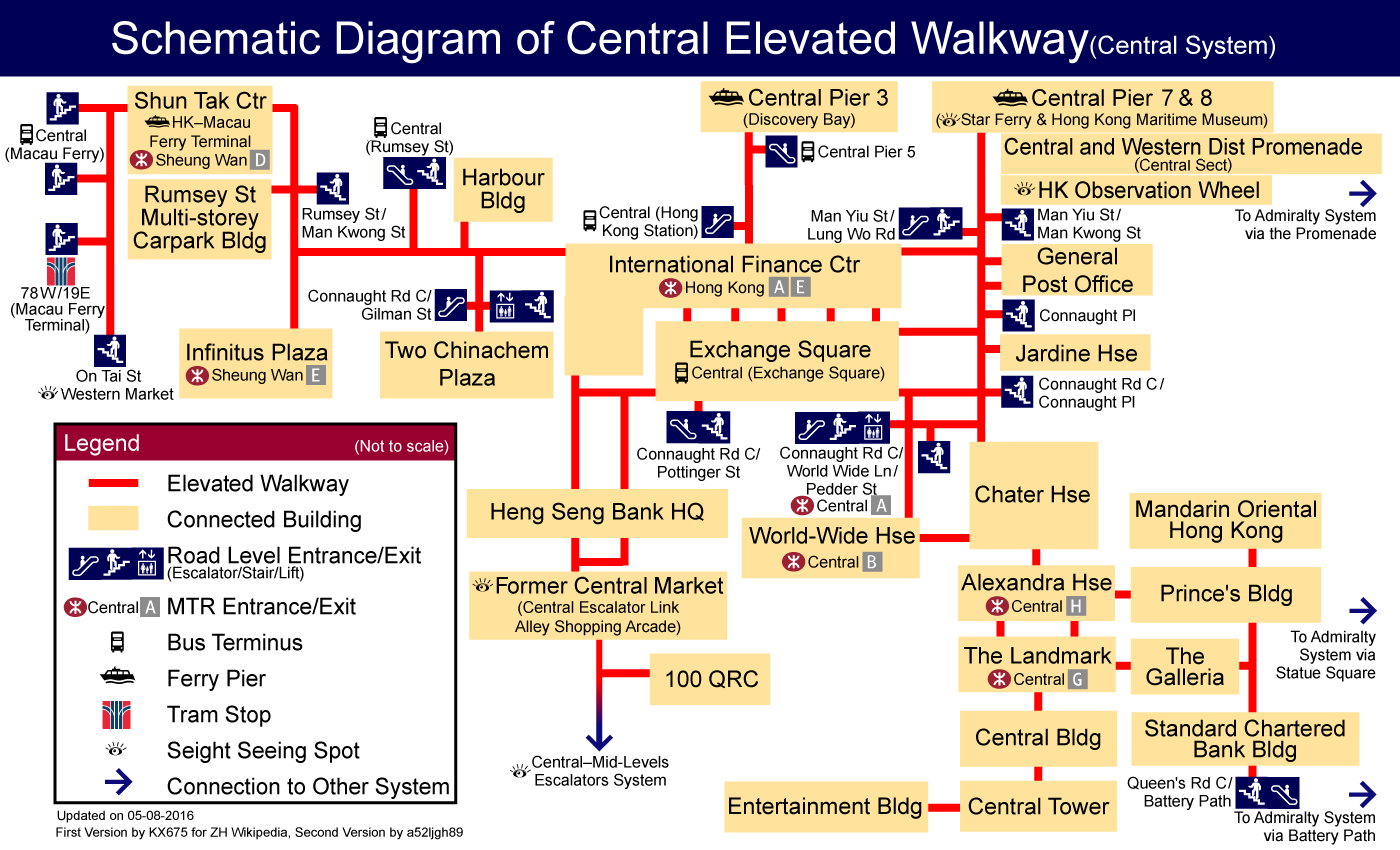
Network Diagram of Central Elevated Walkway (Central System)

=== Coverage ===
- East to: The Landmark, Prince's Building, MTR Hong Kong station, Central station
- South to: Hang Seng Bank main branch, Central–Mid-Levels escalator, Soho, Conduit Road
- West to: Shun Tak Centre (Sheung Wan), Hong Kong–Macau Ferry Terminal, MTR Sheung Wan station
- North to: International Finance Centre, Central Piers, MTR Hong Kong station

=== Connected buildings ===
- International Finance Centre
- City Hall
- Jardine House
- Exchange Square
- General Post Office
- World-Wide House
- Chater House
- Alexandra House
- Mandarin Oriental
- Prince's Building
- 9 Queen's Road Central
- Bank of East Asia main branch
- Standard Chartered Bank Building
- The Landmark
- Central Building
- Central Place
- Hang Seng Bank building
- Central Market
- Harbour Building
- Infinitus Plaza
- Shun Tak Centre

== Admiralty system ==
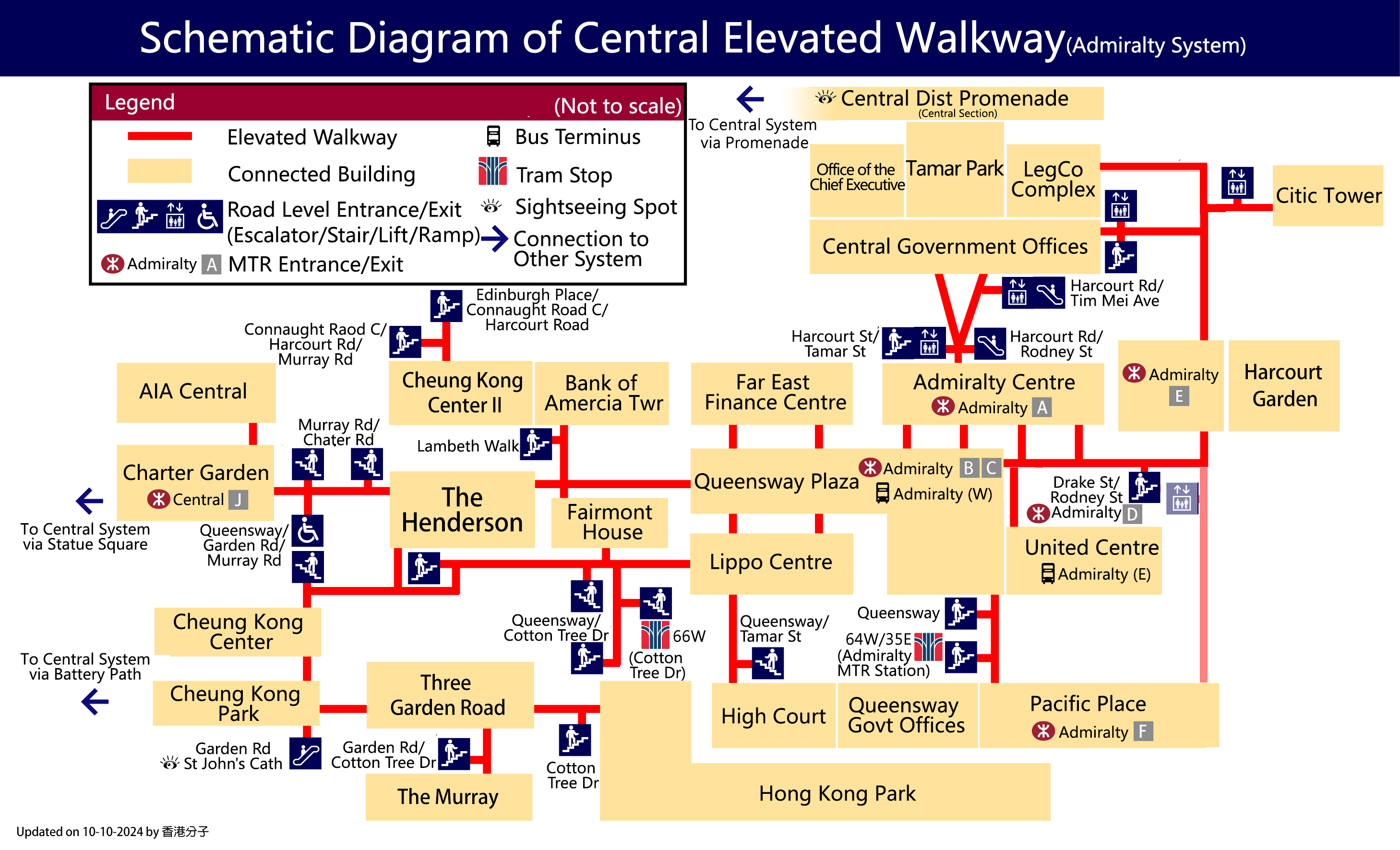
Network Diagram of Central Elevated Walkway (Admiralty System)

=== Coverage ===
- East to: CITIC Tower, MTR Admiralty station
- South to: Hong Kong Park, CITIC Tower
- West to: Hutchison House, AIA Central, Cheung Kong Center
- North to: City Hall

=== Connected buildings ===
- Pacific Place
- CITIC Tower
- United Centre
- Admiralty Centre
- Queensway Plaza
- Far East Finance Centre
- Lippo Centre
- Queensway Government Offices
- Fairmont House
- Murray Road Carpark Building
- Bank of China Tower
- Cheung Kong Center
- Hong Kong Park
- Three Garden Road
- Bank of America Tower
- ~~Hutchison House~~(redevelopment in progress)
- AIA Central

== Interactive map ==
Central Elevated Walkway

== See also ==
- Footbridge Network in Tsuen Wan
