= Worldwide Plaza =

Worldwide Plaza may refer to:

- One Worldwide Plaza, a building in the complex Worldwide Plaza, Hell's Kitchen, New York City
- A shopping center in World-Wide House, Hong Kong
