= Jardine House =

Building in Central, Hong Kong

- 怡和大廈
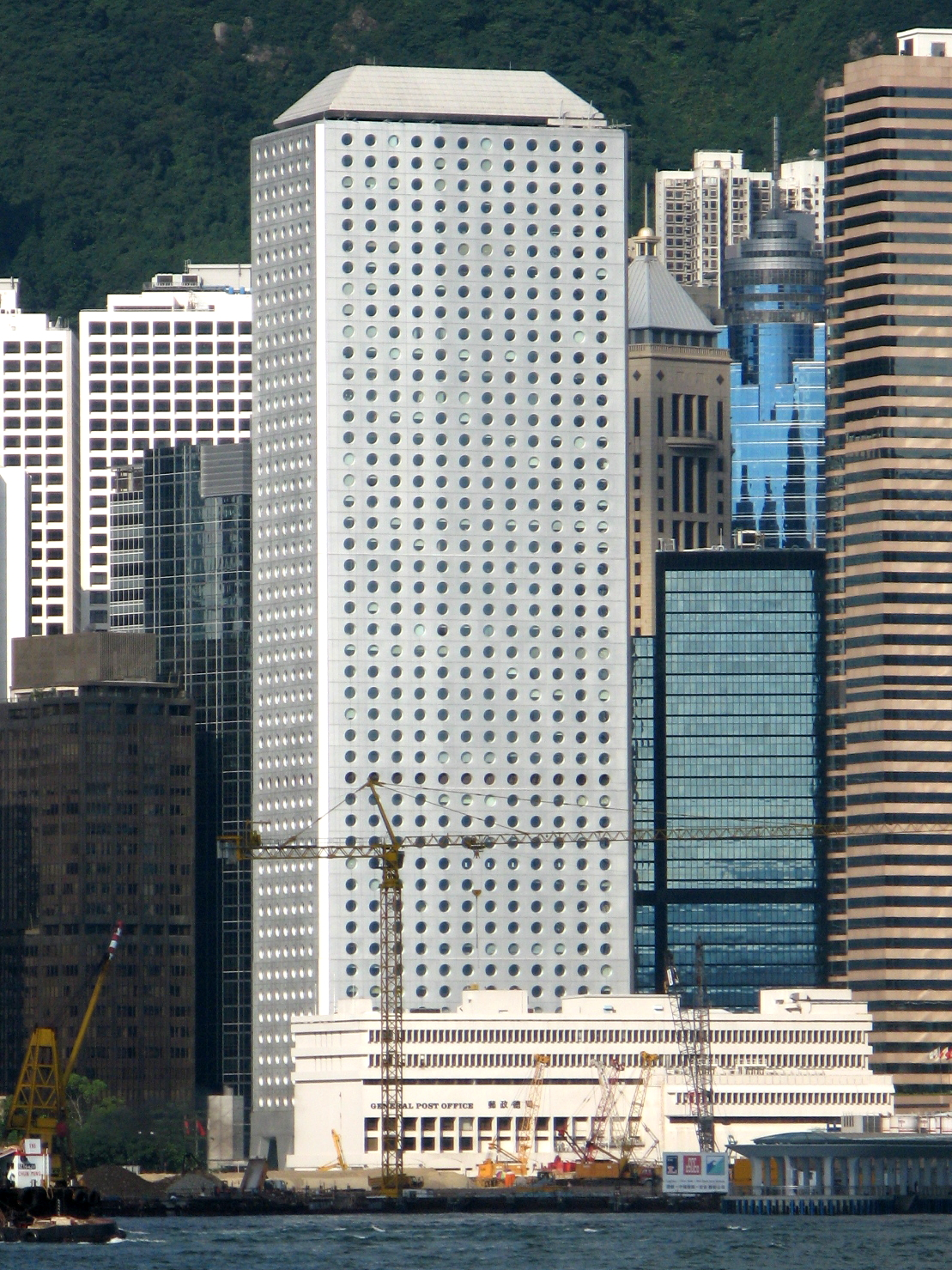
- Jardine House, as seen from Victoria Harbour in June 2008; General Post Office in the foreground.

General information
- Status: Completed
- Type: Commercial offices
- Location: 1 Connaught Place, Central; Hong Kong
- Coordinates: 22°16′59″N 114°9′32″E
- Completed: 1973; 53 years ago
- Opening: 1973; 53 years ago
- Cost: HK$$18,589,744
- Owner: Jardine Matheson

Height
- Roof: 178.5 m (585.6 ft)
- Top floor: 168.5 m (552.8 ft)

Technical details
- Floor count: 52
- Floor area: 700,000 sq ft (65,032 m^{2})
- Lifts/elevators: 24 passenger + 2 service

Design and construction
- Architect: Palmer & Turner
- Developer: Jardine Matheson
- Main contractor: Gammon Construction

Jardine House (Chinese: 怡和大廈), formerly known as Connaught Centre (康樂大廈), is an office tower in Hong Kong. The building is located at 1 Connaught Place, Central on Hong Kong Island. It is owned by Hongkong Land Limited, a subsidiary of Jardines. At the time of its completion in 1973, Jardine House was the tallest building in Hong Kong and in Asia. In 1980, the Hopewell Centre usurped the title of the tallest building in Hong Kong. The building is interconnected by the Central Elevated Walkway with buildings of Hongkong Land Limited like Exchange Square and the International Finance Centre.

There is also another Jardine House in Hamilton, Bermuda, which serves as the registered office for Jardines' Bermuda-domiciled businesses (most of Jardines' businesses including Jardine Matheson Holdings and Hongkong Land are incorporated and domiciled in Bermuda).

== History ==
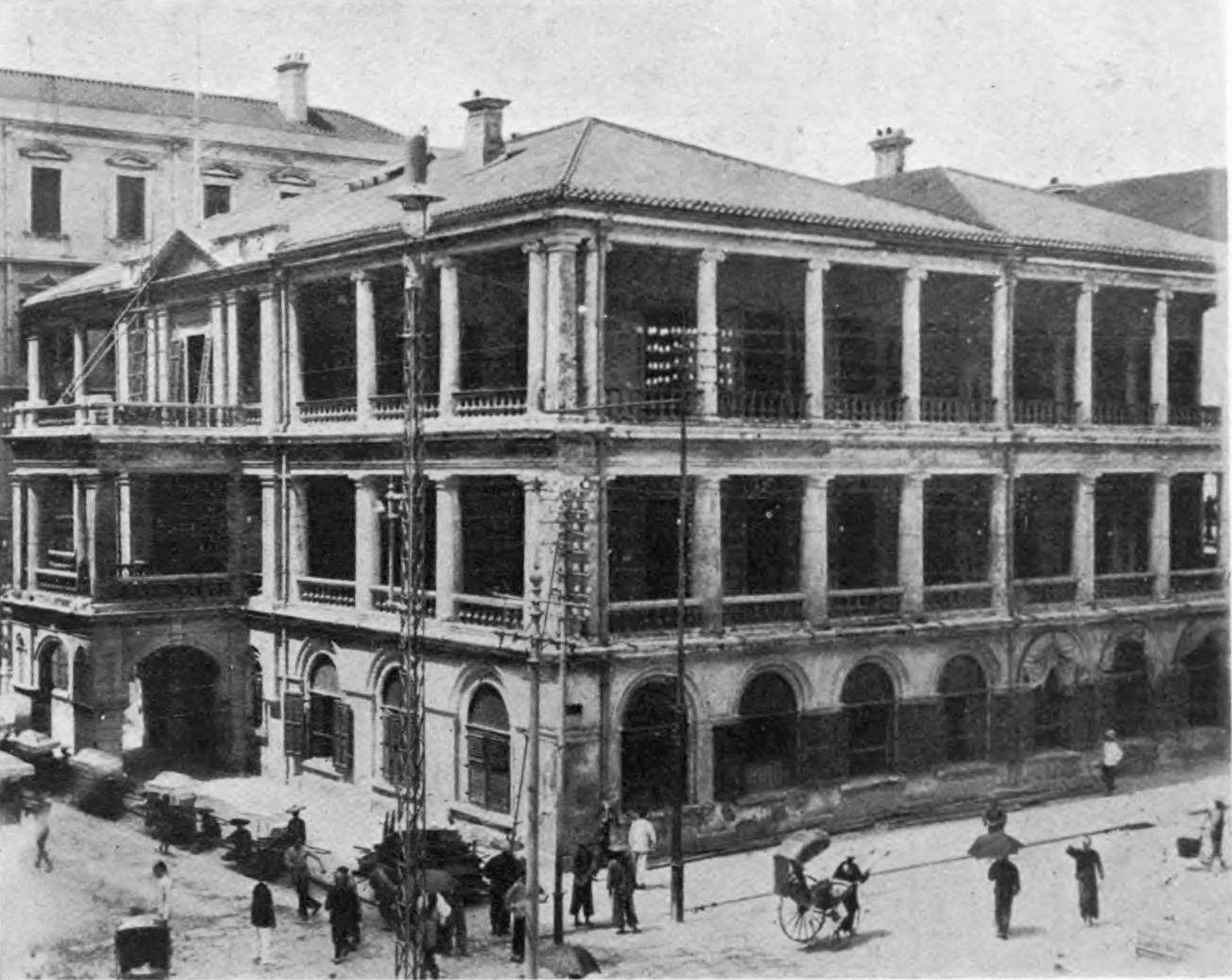
1st generation Jardine House in the 1900s.

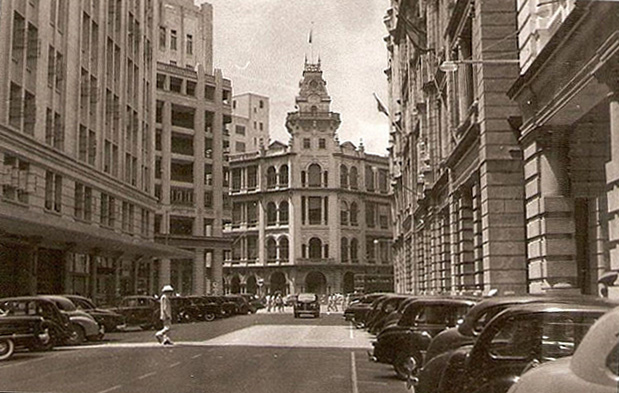
2nd generation Jardine House in the 1930s.

=== Previous Jardine Houses ===
The first three generations of Jardine Houses were situated at 20 Pedder Street, at the corner of Des Voeux Road Central. The first Jardine House was built in 1864. This first building was designed in a style typical of many commercial buildings in 19th Century Hong Kong and borrows elements (arches and pillars) from Neoclassical architecture. In 1908, the second Jardine House was built. It was rebuilt in around 1956 as a 16-storey building. The building was sold by Jardines during the land acquisition exercise of the Landmark complex in Central and 20 Pedder Street is now occupied by the Wheelock House.

=== New Jardine House ===
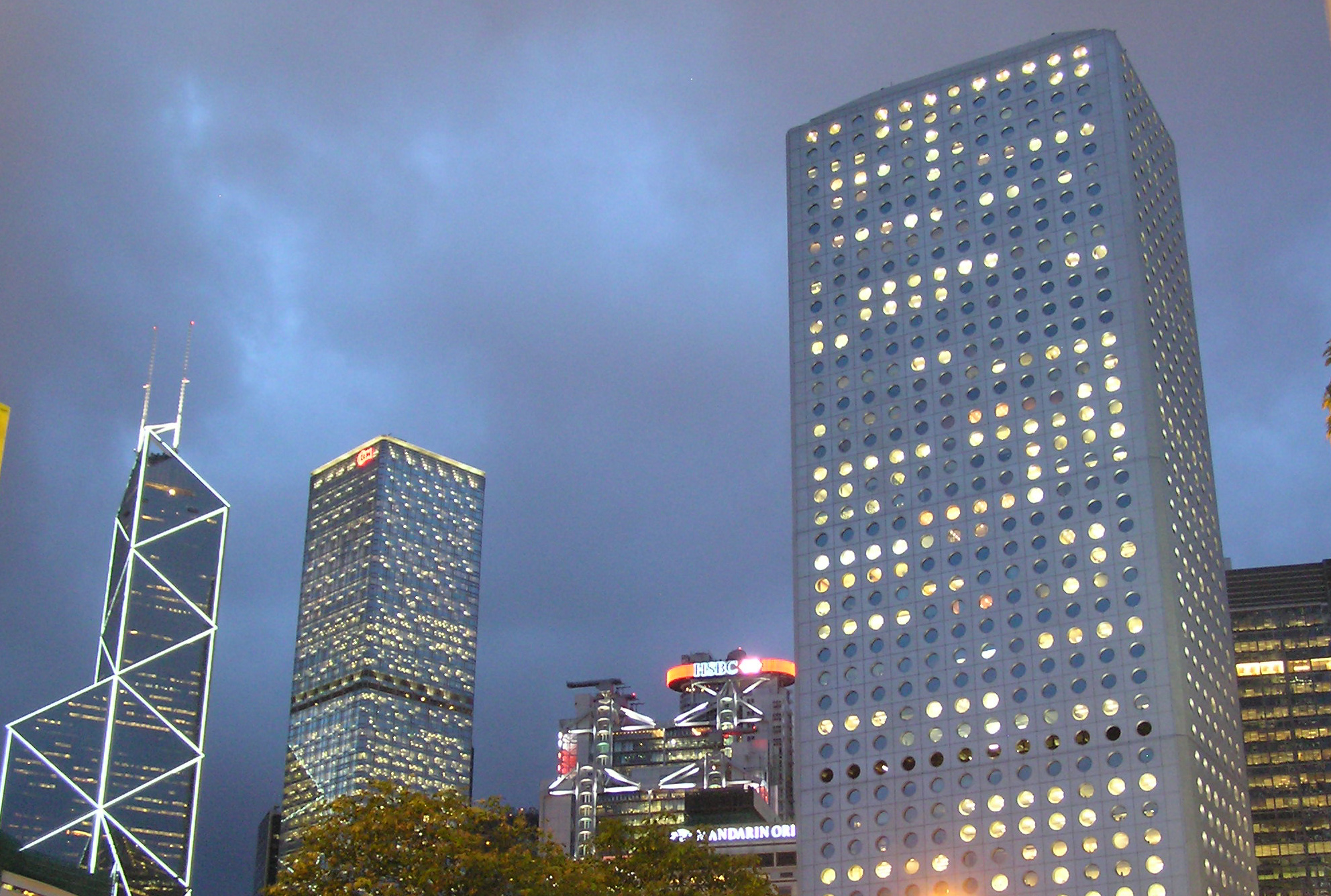
Jardine House (first building from the right) is located in the central business district on Hong Kong Island, next to (from left to right) the BOC Tower, Cheung Kong Center and the HSBC Building. Taken in May 2009.

The new building was constructed on a piece of reclaimed land, under a lease term of 75 years, which was secured by Hongkong Land Limited at a record price of HK$258 million in 1970, payable interest free over a period of 10 years. In exchange, the Government agreed that no building directly to the north of Jardine House would ever be built to obstruct its views. As a result, the height of General Post Office building was capped at 120 ft (37 m). Building costs were estimated at $120 million. Construction of the fifty-two-storey building took 16 months. Metal lettering from the Old Jardine House was salvaged and used in the lobby of the New Jardine House.

== Design ==
The building is constructed with a metal frame, and a curtain wall with round windows. The thickness of the structural frame is reduced because of the shape of the windows.

Unusually for a Jardine property, elevators were produced by Otis Elevator (was the fastest in Asia at the time of opening, one bank reaching speeds of 1,400 feet per minute (430 m/min)), while escalators were manufactured by Schindler Elevator (Jardine was and is still Schindler Elevator's partner in Asia). Schindler would modernize the elevators later in the mid-2000s.

The circular design of the windows has earned the building the nickname, "The House of a Thousand Arseholes."

== In popular culture ==
Jardine House was prominently displayed in the 1988 NBC television miniseries Noble House as the headquarters for Struan's in a subtle nod to James Clavell using Jardines as a model for Struan's. It also appeared in establishing shots in The Amsterdam Kill, and was climbed by a giant gorilla in the climax of The Mighty Peking Man (1977). The building was also featured in the 1978 episode titled "The Chinese Web" of The Amazing Spider-Man TV series.

Jardine House is featured in the Dockside track in Burnout 3: Takedown

== Gallery ==
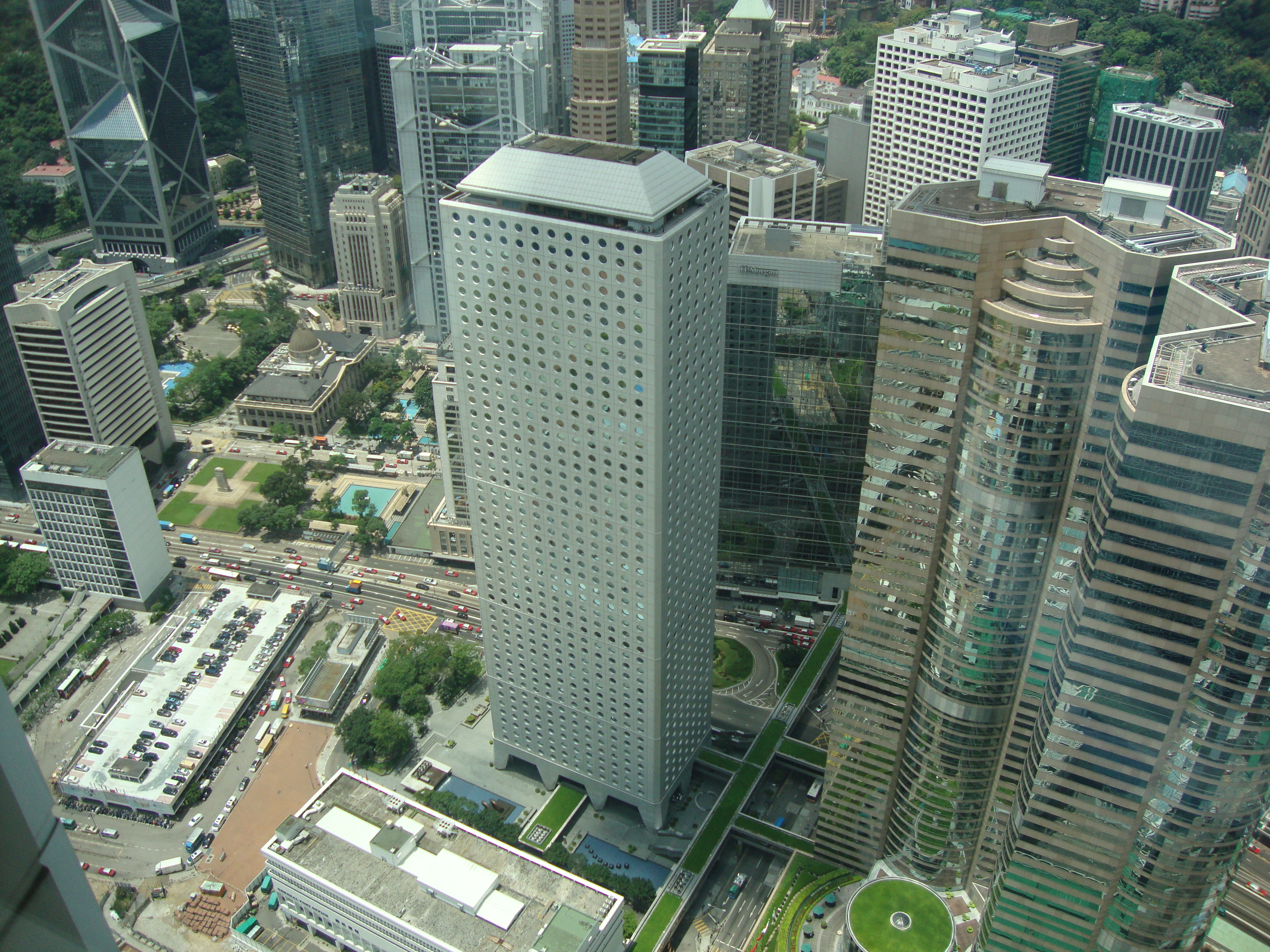
Jardine House seen from IFC2 in May 2013

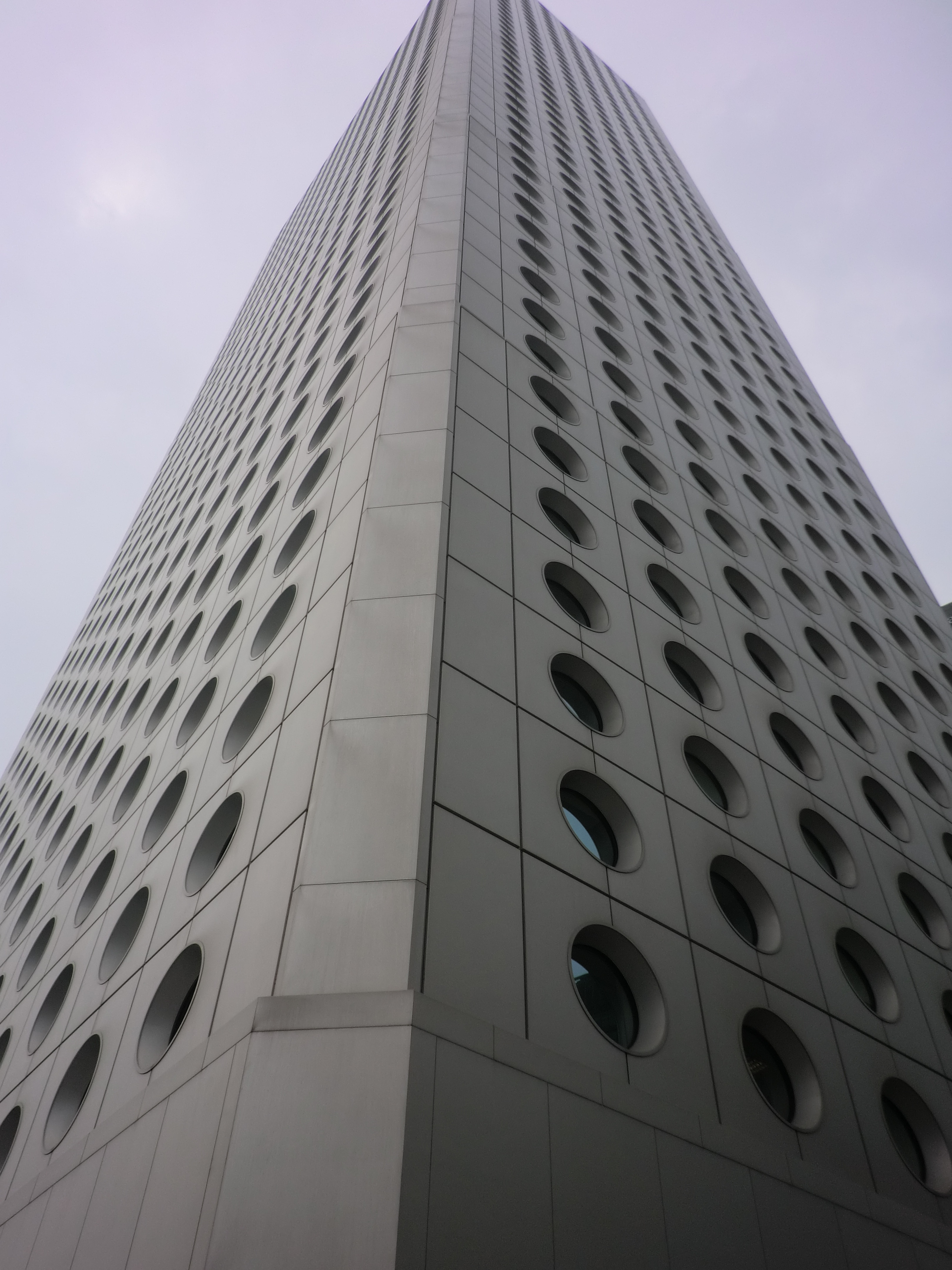
Taken from the Pedestrian bridge skywalk at Central/IFC in September 2011

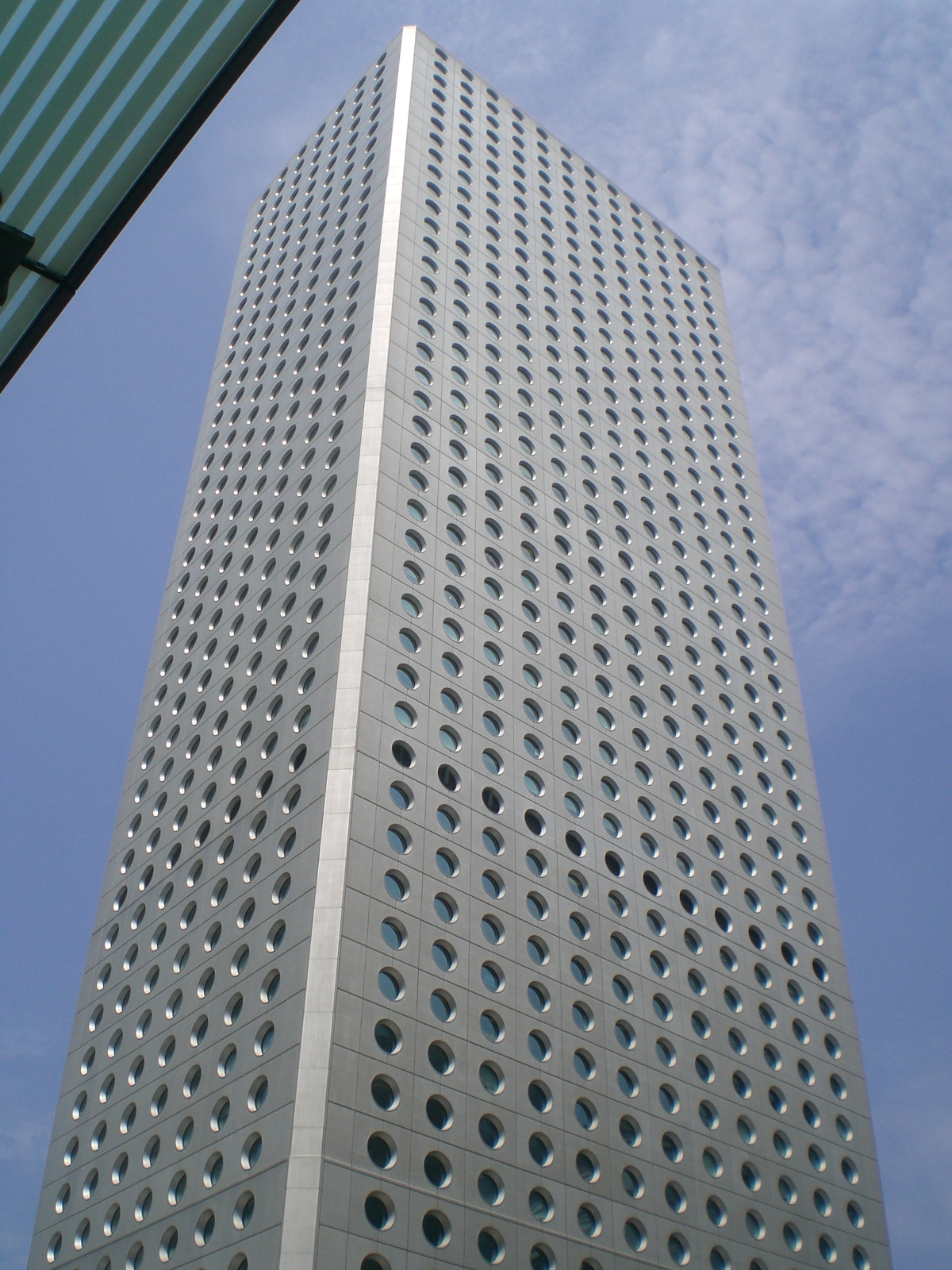
Jardine House in April 2007

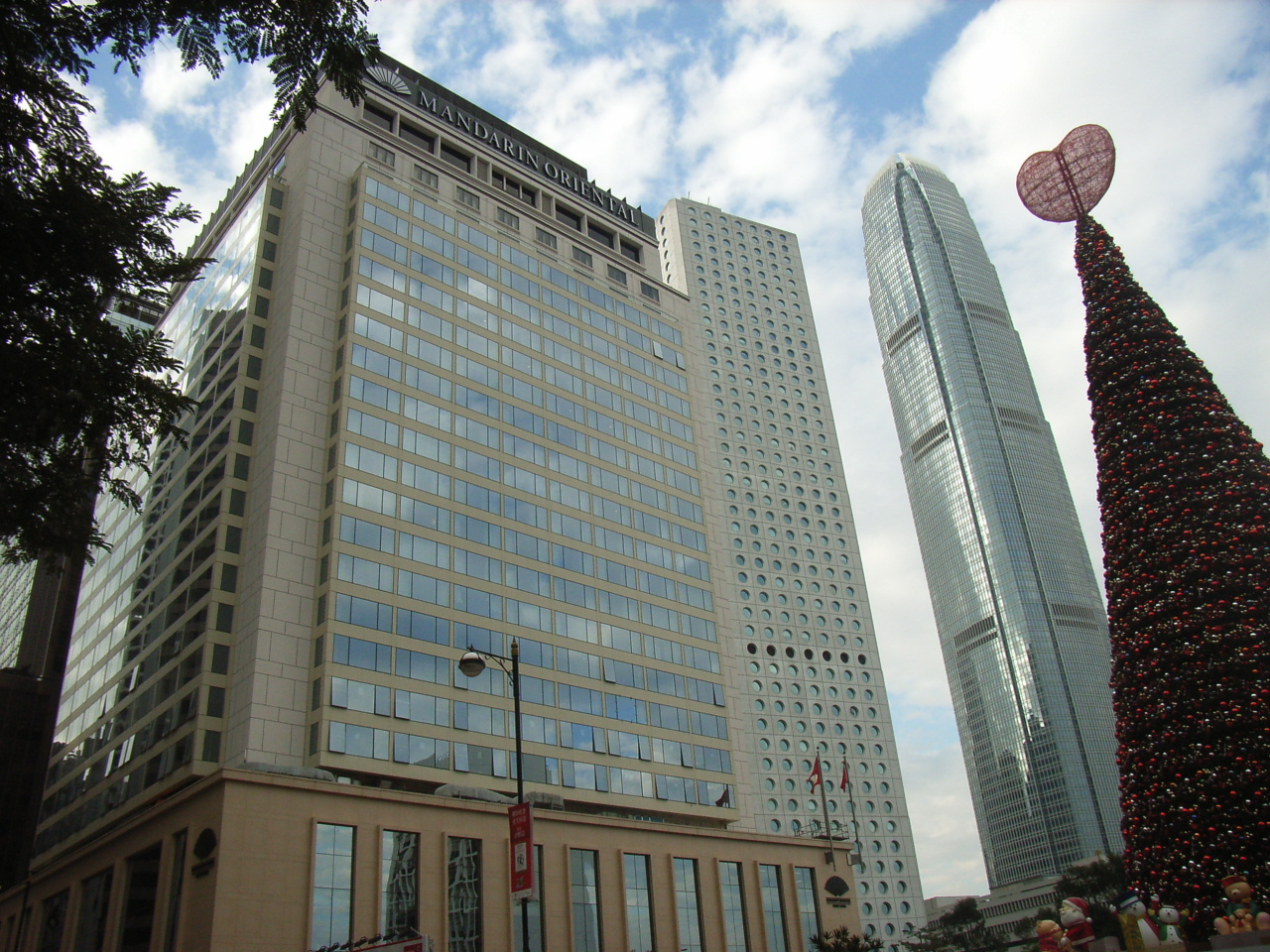
The Mandarin Oriental Hotel, Jardine House and IFC2 seen from Statue Square in December 2006

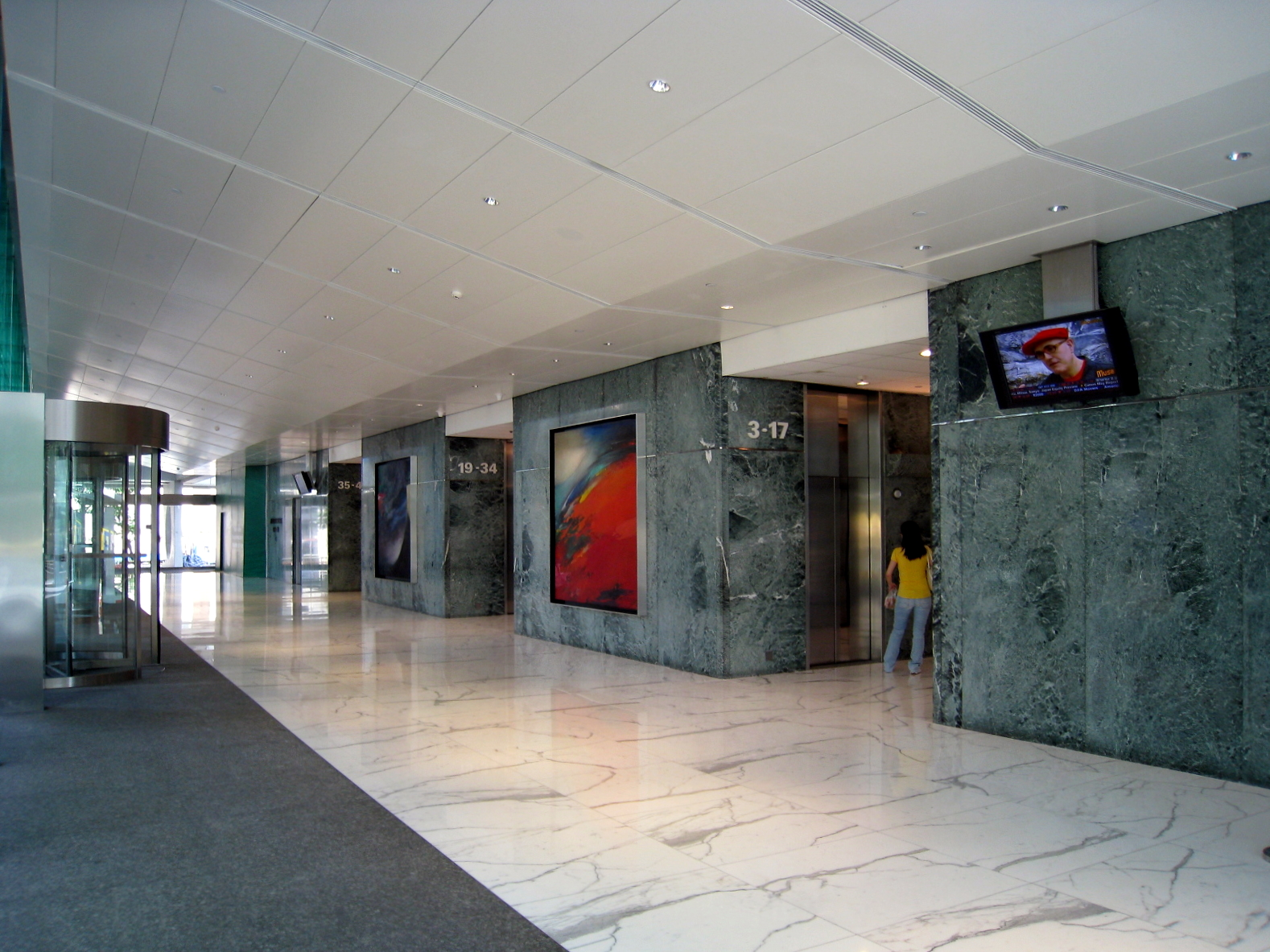
Jardine House lift lobby in Ground Floor in June 2008

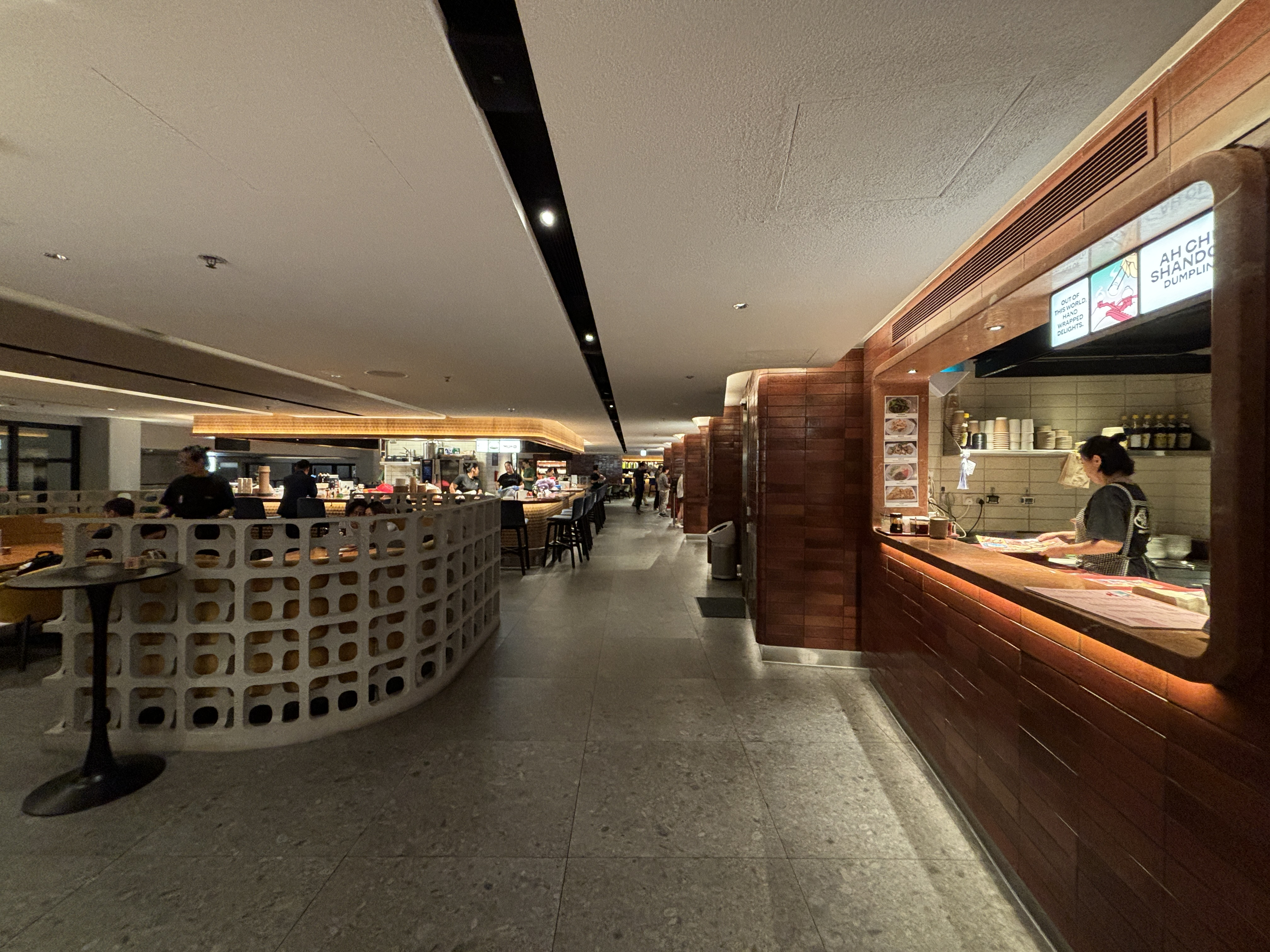
Base foodhall in Jardine House basement

== See also ==
- Timeline of tallest buildings in Hong Kong
