= Central Market, Hong Kong =

Historic market building in Hong Kong

Coordinates: 22°17′1.78″N 114°9′19.51″E

Central Market
- 中環街市
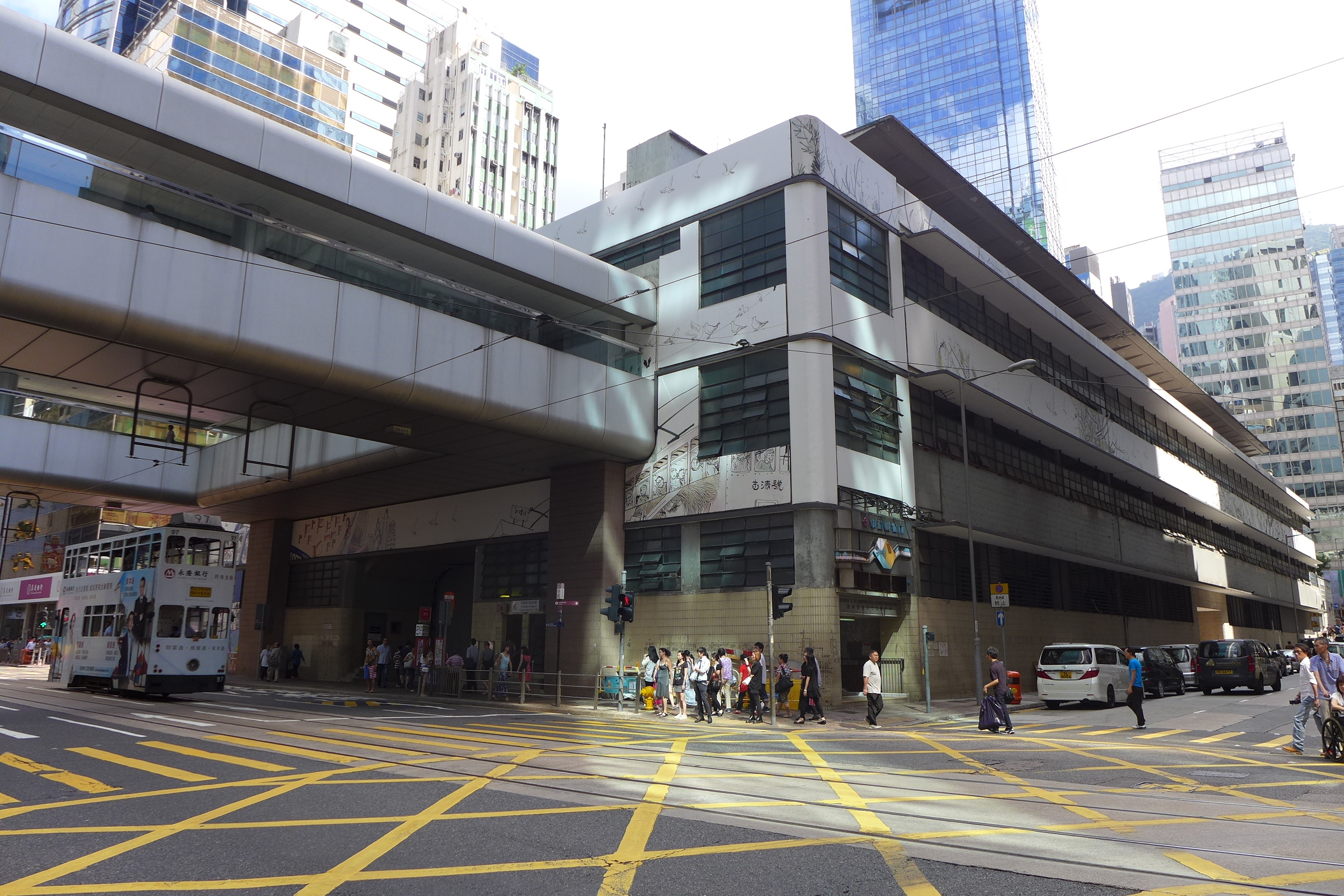
- Corner of Des Voeux Road Central and Jubilee Street, with a section of the Central Elevated Walkway, in June 2015.
- Interactive map of the Central Market area

General information
- Type: Marketplace
- Architectural style: Bauhaus
- Location: Central, Hong Kong, 80 Des Voeux Road Central; 93 Queen's Road Central, China
- Groundbreaking: 1937; 89 years ago
- Completed: 1938; 88 years ago
- Opened: 1 May 1939; 87 years ago
- Cost: HK$900,000,000

Technical details
- Floor count: 4

Design and construction
- Designations

Hong Kong Graded Building – Grade III
- Designated: 1996; 30 years ago
- Reference no.: 599

Website
- https://www.centralmarket.hk/en

Central Market, Hong Kong
- Traditional Chinese: 中環街市
- Simplified Chinese: 中环街市
Transcriptions
Standard Mandarin
- Hanyu Pinyin: Zhōnghuán Jiēshì
Yue: Cantonese
- Yale Romanization: Jūng wàahn gāai síh
- Jyutping: Zung1 waan4 gaai1 si5

Alternate name
- Chinese: 中央街市
Transcriptions
Standard Mandarin
- Hanyu Pinyin: Zhōngyāng Jiēshì
Yue: Cantonese
- Yale Romanization: Jūng yēung gāai síh
- Jyutping: Zung1 joeng1 gaai1 si5

Central Market is a fresh food market in Central, Hong Kong and the first wet market in the city. It is one of only two existing Bauhaus market buildings in Hong Kong, the other one being Wan Chai Market.

It is located between Jubilee Street, Queen Victoria Street, Queen's Road Central and Des Voeux Road Central. By its side is the first public female toilet and first above-ground toilets in Hong Kong.

== History ==
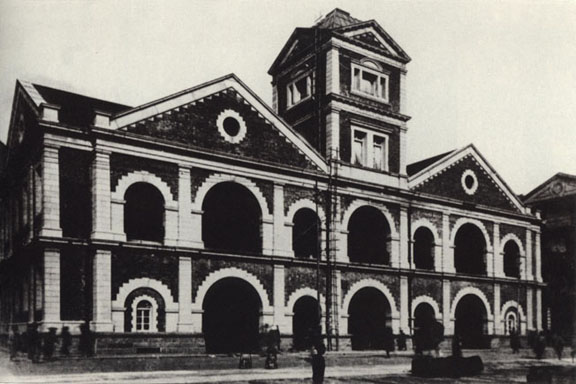
Old Central Market of 1895.

=== Earlier structures ===
The precursor of the market was Canton Bazaar, which was established in 1842 on Queen's Road Central between Cochrane Street and Graham Street. In 1843, it was also known as the Middle Bazaar. The Chinese population were later forced to relocate from Central to the Tai Ping Shan area due to a series of fires. The market was then replaced by residential houses for Europeans. The bazaar was moved to Queensway, where the present-day High Court stands. It housed Chinese furniture dealers, joiners, cabinet makers and curio shops. Due to its proximity of Naval Yard and the construction of cantonment, the bazaar, shops and civil tenement had to be moved. In the 1850s, it was moved to its current location on Des Voeux Road (then known as The Praya). Its name also changed to Central Market (中環街市).

The market was rebuilt in 1858, then completely replaced with a Western marble structure in 1895. The rebuilt market was a three-storey Victorian-style structure with a tower in the middle.

=== Current Bauhaus structure ===
The market was demolished again in 1937, this time replaced with a Bauhaus structure. Construction was completed in 1938, and cost HK$900,000. The market re-opened on 1 May 1939.

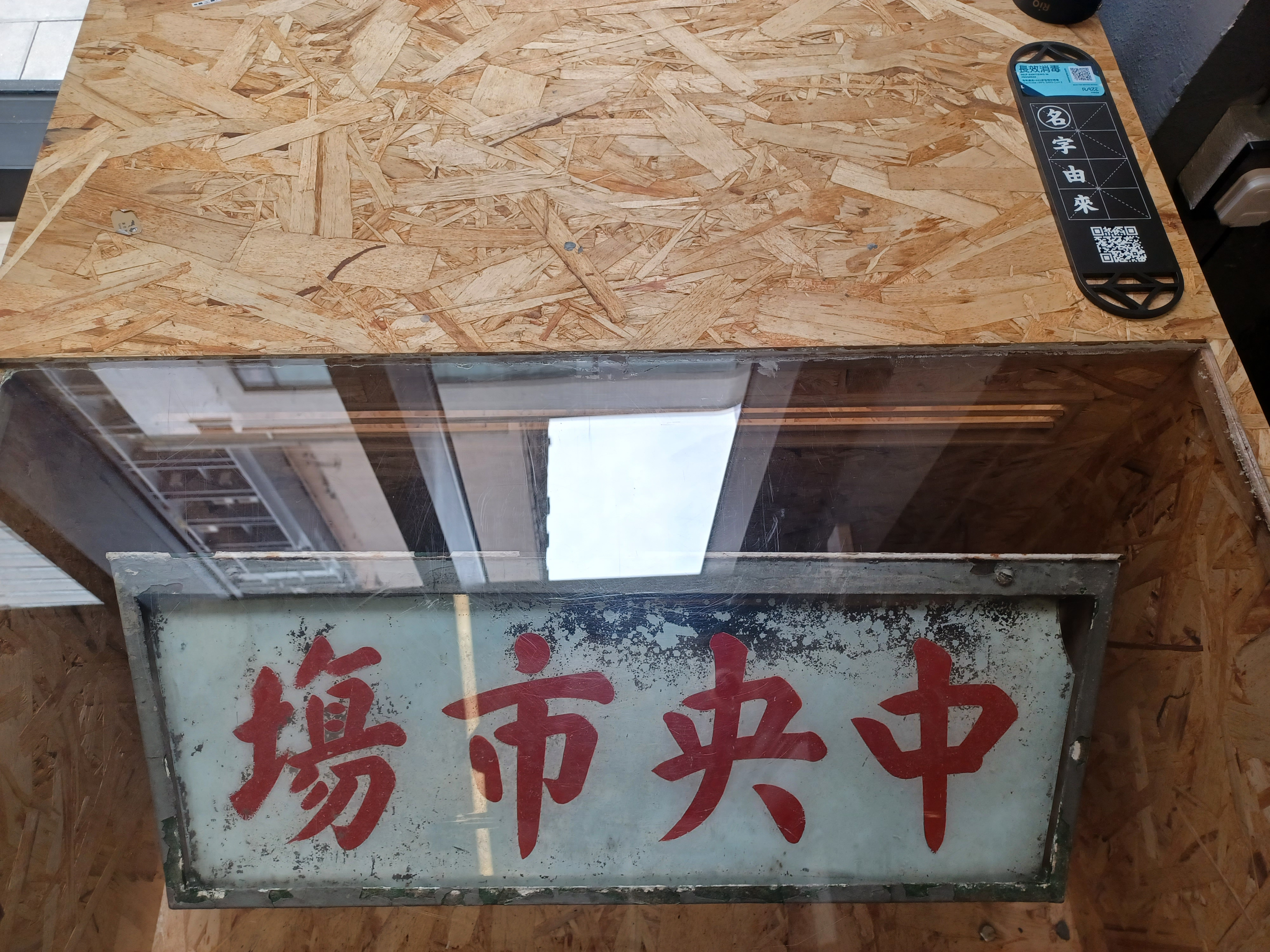
Sign with the old name used since the Japanese occupation to 1993

During the Japanese occupation of Hong Kong between 1941 and 1945, the Chinese name of the market was changed from 中環街市 (chung wan kai shi) to 中央市場 (chung yeung shi cheung). The Chinese name displayed at the Des Voeux Road Central entrance was not restored until 1993. Central Market was the biggest meat market in Southeast Asia and the then-Governor of Hong Kong David Trench made a visit to the market in 1967. The importance of the market attracted another Governor Alexander Grantham to pay another visit.

In 1994, the western part of its second floor was converted into the Central Escalator Link Alley Shopping Arcade, an access way between the Central Elevated Walkway and Central–Mid-Levels escalators. It was managed by the Urban Council until its dissolution in 1999. The market was then closed in March 2003.

=== State of disuse, 2003–2017 ===
The building was largely abandoned from 2003, with few stores along a renovated pedestrian corridor inside, Central Escalator Link Alley Shopping Arcade (中環購物廊). The corridor linked by two footbridges to Hang Seng Bank Headquarters Building and Central Elevated Walkway, and another footbridge to the Central–Mid-Levels escalator. Shops in the arcade included tailors, cleanser, collectors and other trades. On Sunday, one side of the corridor was a popular gathering place among Filipino domestic workers.

Prior to the redevelopment, the building was temporarily redecorated on the theme of Central Oasis.

=== Renewal and current status ===
From 2017 to 2021, the building underwent significant works for preservation and revitalization, including major rehabilitation to the aging building structure. This was being overseen by the Urban Renewal Authority. The pedestrian corridor continued to provide access through the site during the majority of the redevelopment works.

It was reopened to the public on August 23, 2021 as a new centre for retailers, eateries and public areas. The renovation retained some original architectural structures, such as some market stalls and its iconic stairwell. The market is currently operated by the Chinachem Group on a ten-year lease.

== Structure ==
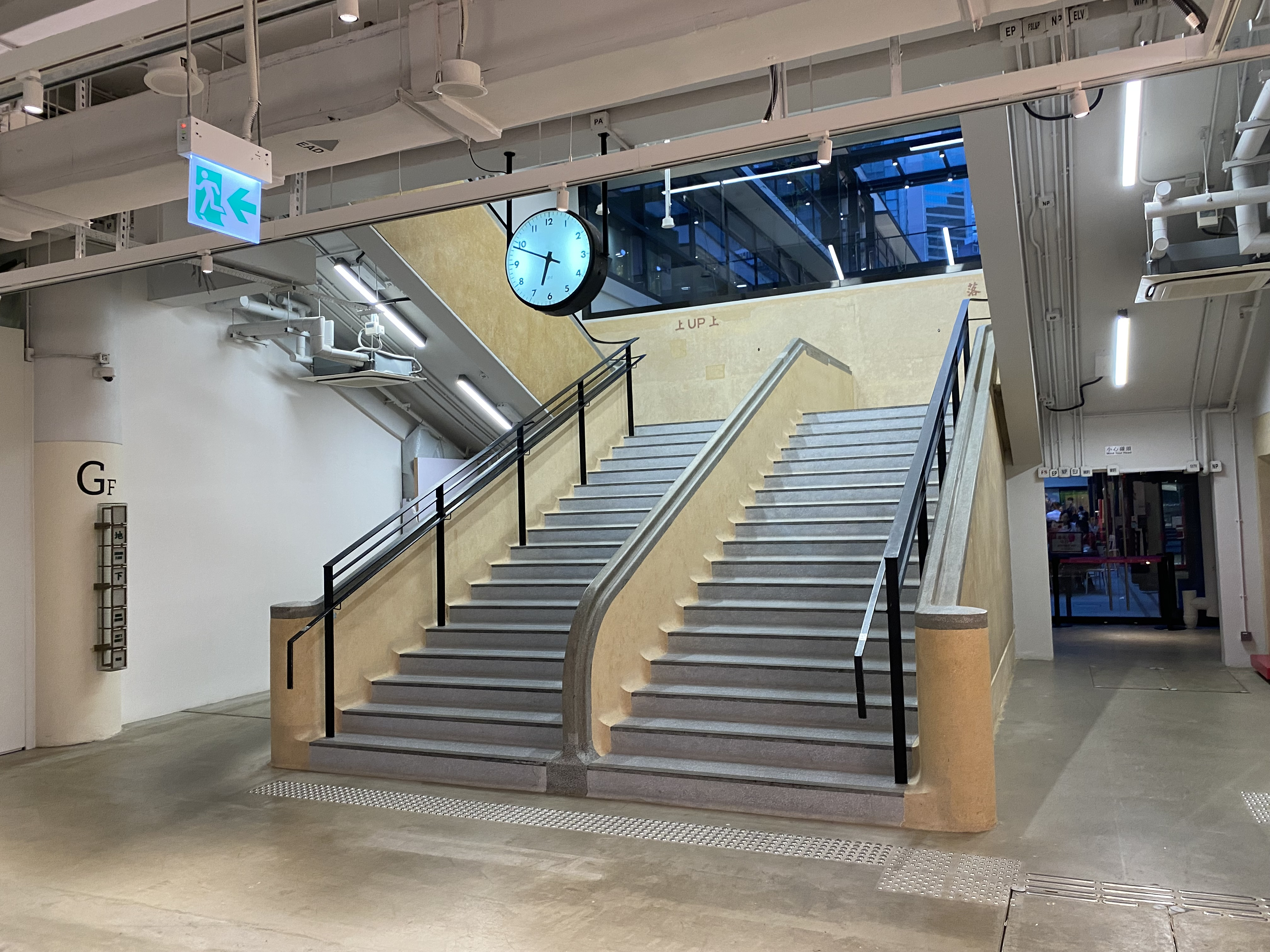
The central staircase after the renewal

The market is housed in a 4-storey reinforced concrete structure, and contains 200 booths inside. The market is spacious with a central court, high ceiling and window walls for natural light and ventilation. There are two entrances of the market. The Des Voeux Road Central entrance is on the ground floor while the Queen's Road Central entrance bridges the first floor. In the early days, the root floor were offices and quarters of hygiene inspectors and other staff.

== Conservation ==
Central Market is listed as a Grade III historic building. It is part of the Central and Western Heritage Trail.
