= General Post Office, Hong Kong =

Building in Central, Hong Kong

Coordinates: 22°17′0.30″N 114°9′34.51″E

General Post Office
- 郵政總局
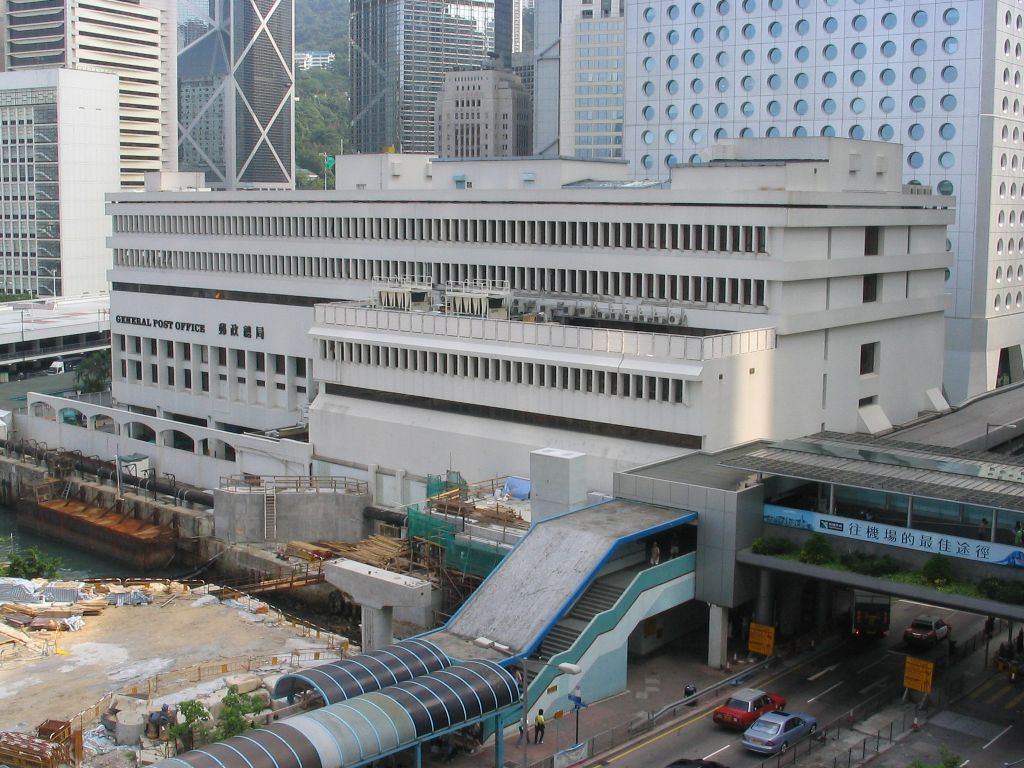
- General Post Office in Central, built 1976
- Interactive map of the General Post Office area

General information
- Location: Central, 2 Connaught Place, Hong Kong
- Current tenants: Hongkong Post
- Completed: 11 August 1976; 50 years ago

Website
- Official website

General Post Office, Hong Kong
- Traditional Chinese: 郵政總局
- Simplified Chinese: 邮政总局
Transcriptions
Standard Mandarin
- Hanyu Pinyin: Yóuzhèng Zǒngjú
Yue: Cantonese
- Yale Romanization: Yàuh jing júng guhk
- Jyutping: Yau^{4} zing^{3} zung^{2} guk^{6}

The General Post Office (GPO) is the headquarters of Hongkong Post. Built in 1976, it is located at Connaught Place, Central, Hong Kong. The office was adjacent to the former Star Ferry Pier, and it is adjacent to Jardine House and the International Finance Centre. The current building occupied a seafront location until 2007, since when reclamation works have led to it becoming inland.

As of 2018, the building is scheduled for demolition, although there are efforts to preserve it as a historical landmark.

== Past locations ==
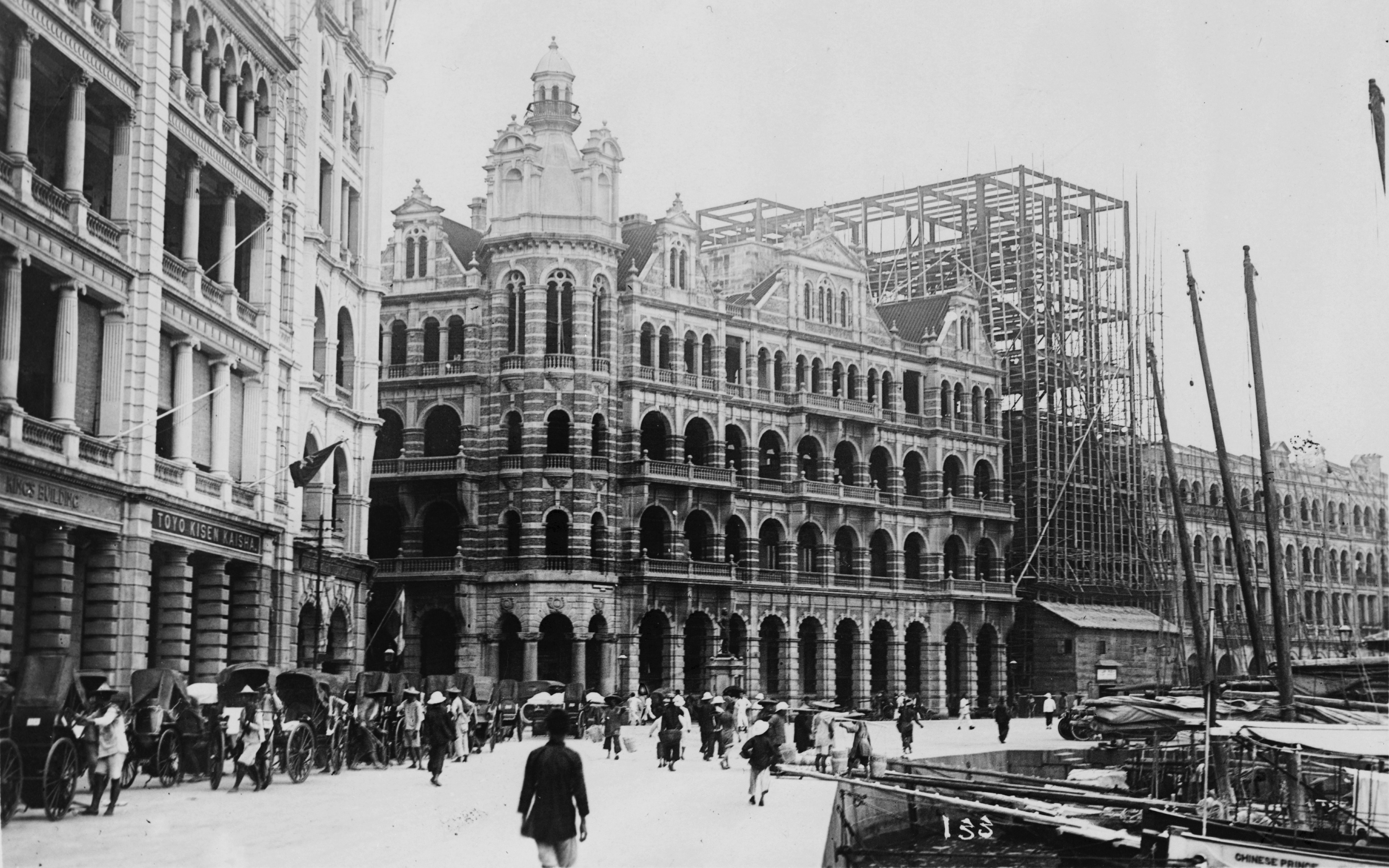
General Post Office, c. 1923

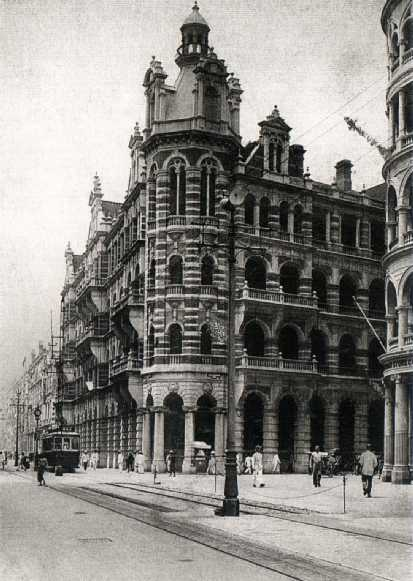
General Post Office at Des Voeux Road Central and Pedder Street in Central, 1911

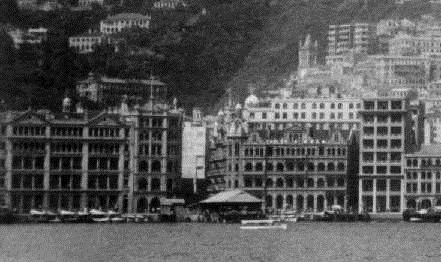
View from Victoria Harbour in the 1920s. The General Post Office is the third building from right, at the corner with Pedder Street. The pier in front is Blake Pier.

The GPO has been moved three times after several reclamations as it was essential to locate the office near the shore for receiving letters from ocean liners. Past locations of the GPO were:

- 1841–1846: Above St. John's Cathedral, Garden Road (current Former Central Government Offices)
- 1846–1911: Queen's Road Central, opposite D'Aguilar Street
- 1911–1976: Junction of Des Voeux Road Central and Pedder Street (rebuilt into World-Wide House)
- 1976–present: 2 Connaught Place, Central

=== 1846 GPO ===
In 1846 premises which had belonged to Dent & Co. were transformed into Government Treasury (庫務署), Supreme Court and General Post Office. This land was auctioned in 1921, when it achieved a price of HK$50 per square foot. The resulting China Building (華人行) was completed in 1924.

=== 1911 GPO ===
Reclamations had taken place in the meantime in the late 1890s, and the first General Post Office was relocated in 1911 into new premises on the newly reclaimed section of Pedder Street. It was a typical Edwardian municipal construction of granite and red brick, and was known as "the Old Lady of Pedder Street".

This old General Post Office building was demolished in 1976, and was functionally relocated to Connaught Place to make way for the construction of the Central station of the MTR below ground. Below the building is the interchange of Hong Kong station and Central station of MTR. World-Wide House, an office block, was constructed above ground.

Joseph Ting, former chief curator of the Hong Kong Museum of History, regarded the 1911 General Post Office as Hong Kong's most beautiful building.

=== 1976 GPO ===
The building was constructed on reclaimed land. In 1967, the Government had planned for a 30-storey block, with 5 floors for the GPO, and 25 for government offices.

The site directly to its south was secured by Hongkong Land at a record price. In exchange, the Government was obliged to accede to a stipulation that no building directly to the north of Connaught Centre, now Jardine House, would obstruct its views, thus the maximum height of the GPO building was limited to 120 feet.

The GPO was designed by architect K. M. Tseng, as a 5-storey building, and the foundation to support another 2, up to the maximum permitted height of 120 feet. The building houses the first central vacuum-cleaning system in Hong Kong, without the need to change bags.

For an alternative view and update, please read the following articles: # Pamela Pang, Maximum Cards of the Old General Post Office of Hong Kong, Journal no. 29, The Hong Kong Philatelic Society # Pamela Pang and Richard A Whittington, The General Post Offices of Hong Kong, Journal No. 30, The Hong Kong Philatelic Society # Pamela Pang and Richard A Whittington, The General Post Offices of Hong Kong, Journal July 2026 No. 417, The Hong Kong Study Circle

== Gallery ==
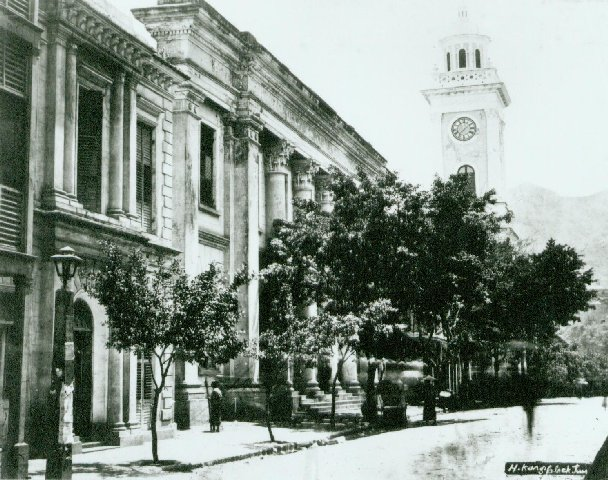
Courthouse (centre) and the 2nd GPO (left), c.1880

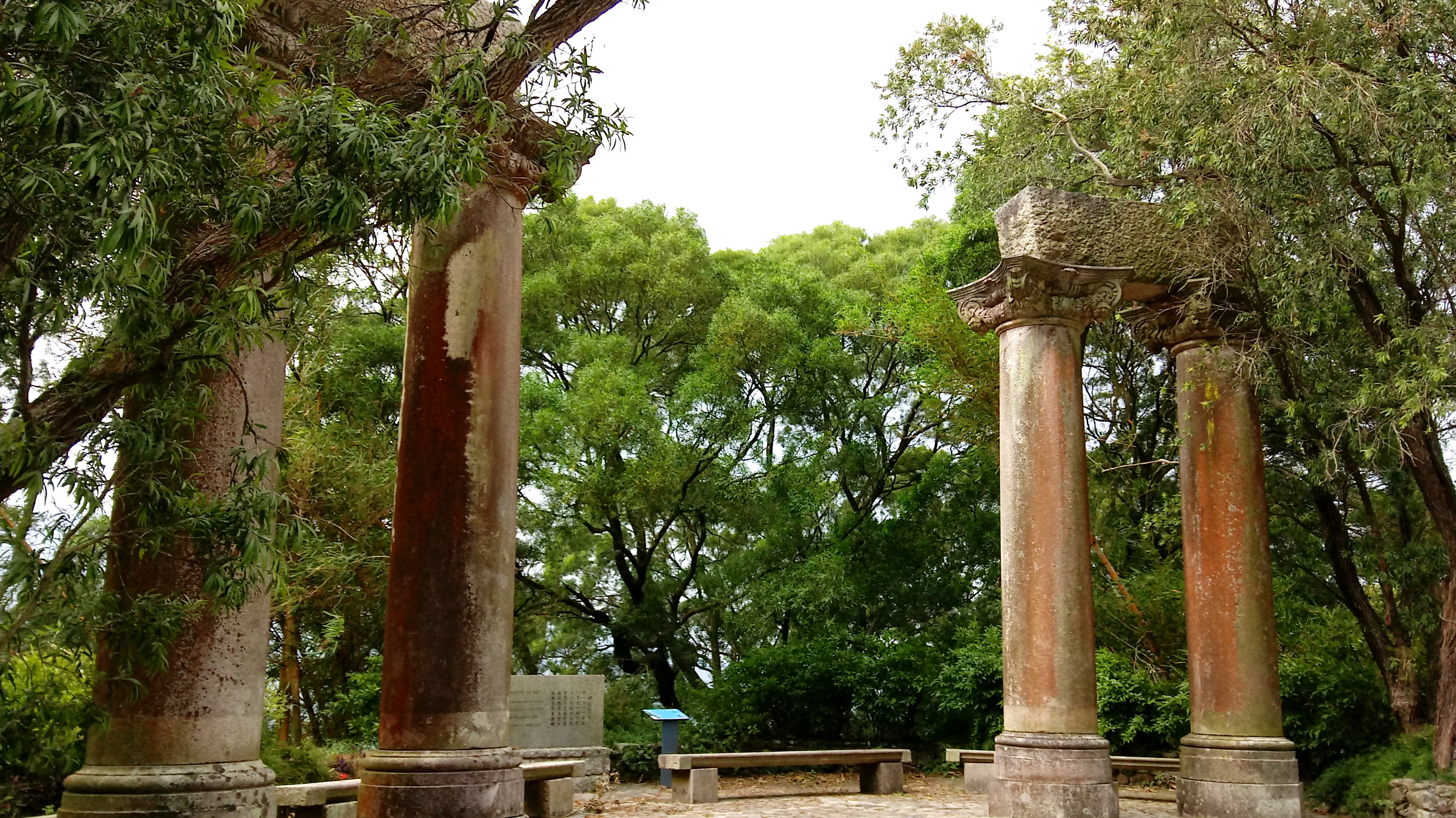
Pillars of the 1911 GPO, now displayed in the Kadoorie Farm and Botanic Garden

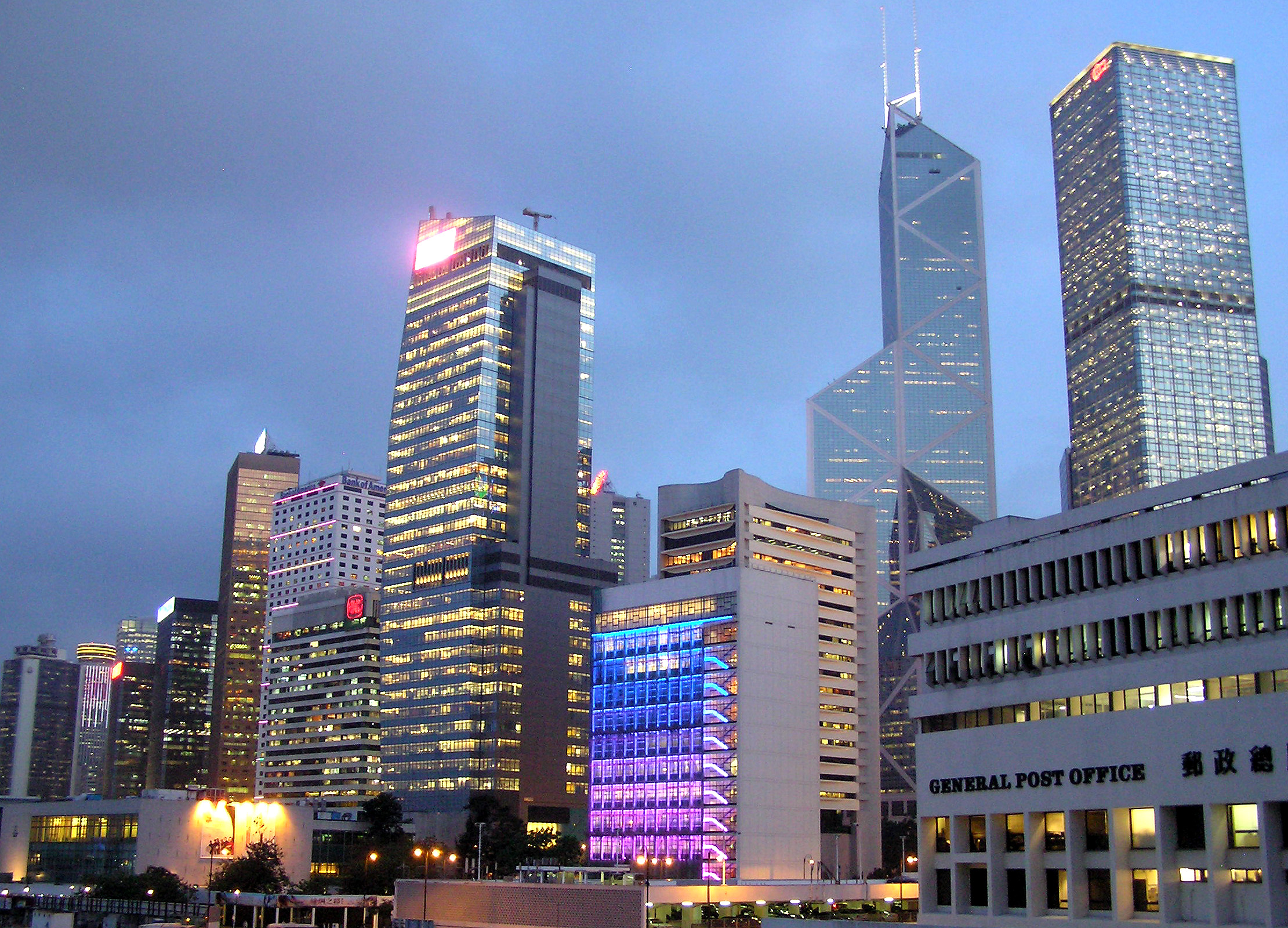
The General Post Office, the City Hall and the surrounding office buildings

Philatelic datestamp of General Post Office
