= Connaught Place, Hong Kong =

Square and roadway in Central, Hong Kong

Coordinates: 22.2830°N 114.1594°E

Connaught Place
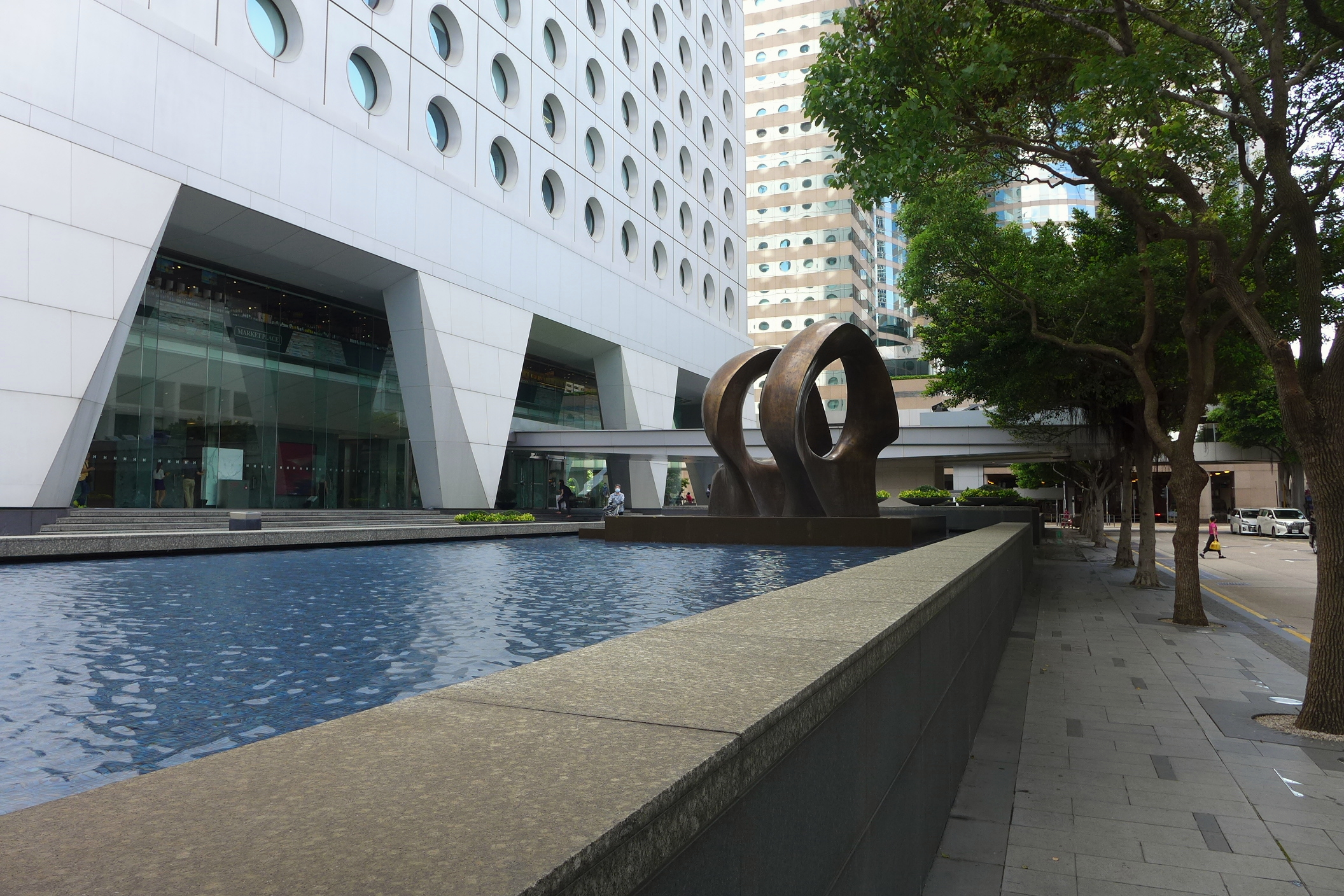
- Traditional Chinese: 康樂廣場
Transcriptions
Yue: Cantonese
- Yale Romanization: hong1 lok6 gwong2 cheung4

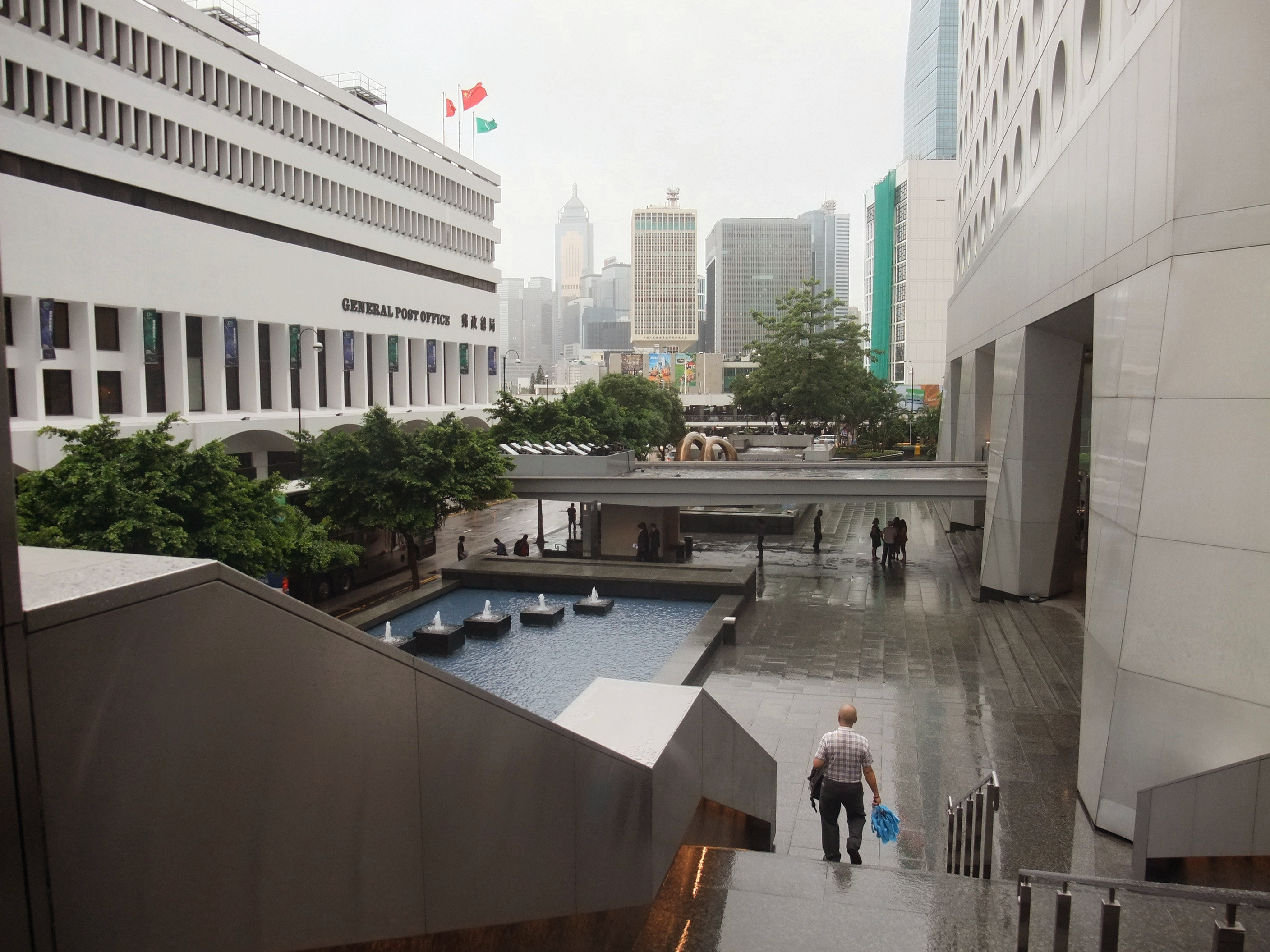
Connaught Place between the General Post Office (left) and Jardine House on the right

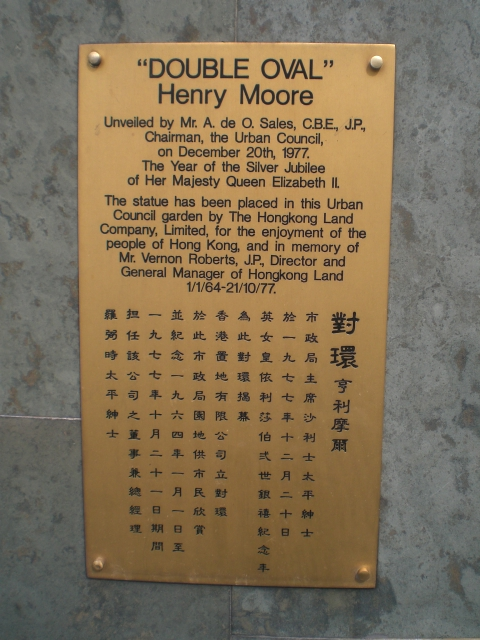
Memorial plaque on Double Oval

Connaught Place (Chinese: 康樂廣場) is a square (and adjacent roadway) near Jardine House in Central, Hong Kong. The General Post Office and Exchange Square have Connaught Place addresses.

Opened in December 1977, the square is home to a statue by Henry Moore entitled Double Oval. The square and the surrounding buildings are all built in a 20th-century modern architectural style.

It is named after Prince Arthur, Duke of Connaught and Strathearn.

== History ==
In 1976, Hongkong Land, the developer of the adjacent Connaught Centre (now Jardine House), approached the Urban Council, and offered to help fund construction of the square. The company procured a preliminary layout plan and selected the Henry Moore sculpture. On 17 September 1976, the council agreed to proceed with project on a joint venture basis with Hongkong Land. Hongkong Land funded about 25 per cent of the project, and retained ownership of the sculpture, while the council covered the remaining cost, and managed the space following completion.

The square was completed in December 1977. The square and the sculpture were both formally unveiled on 20 December 1977 by Urban Council chairman A. de O. Sales.

== Features ==
The focal point of the square is a sculpture by English artist Henry Moore titled Double Oval, one of two casts from a 1966 mould. Upon its unveiling in December 1977, it was dedicated to Vernon Roberts, former director and general manager of the Hongkong Land company, who had died on 21 October of that year.

Other features include planted areas, seating, and two large pools with fountains.

== See also ==
- List of streets and roads in Hong Kong
- List of urban public parks and gardens in Hong Kong
