= World-Wide House =

Office building in Central, Hong Kong

Coordinates: 22°16′57″N 114°9′28.44″E

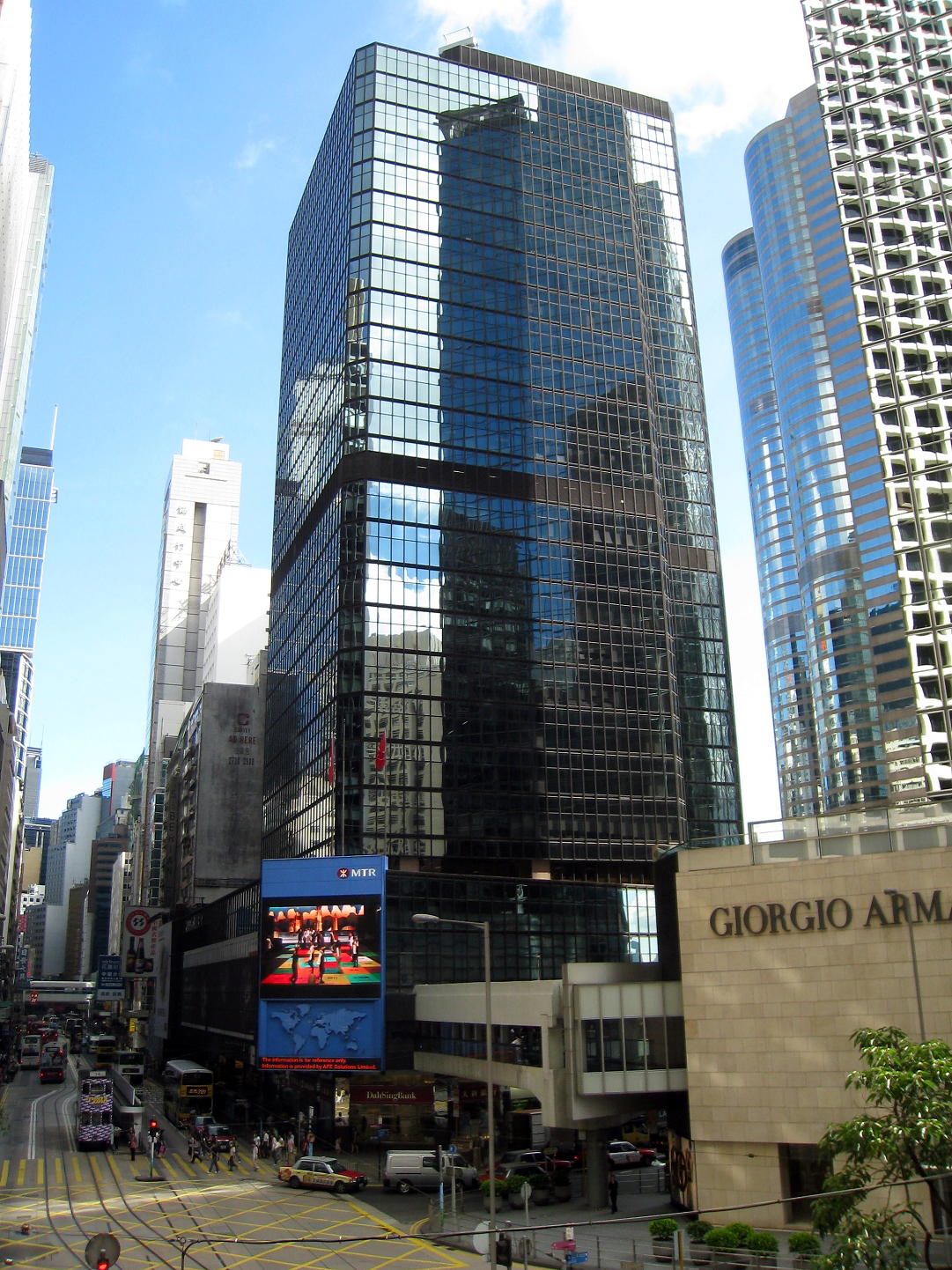
- Worldwide House, viewed from Des Voeux Road
- Traditional Chinese: 環球大廈
- Simplified Chinese: 环球大厦
Transcriptions
Standard Mandarin
- Hanyu Pinyin: Huánqiú Dàshà
Yue: Cantonese
- Jyutping: waan4 kau4 daai6 haa6

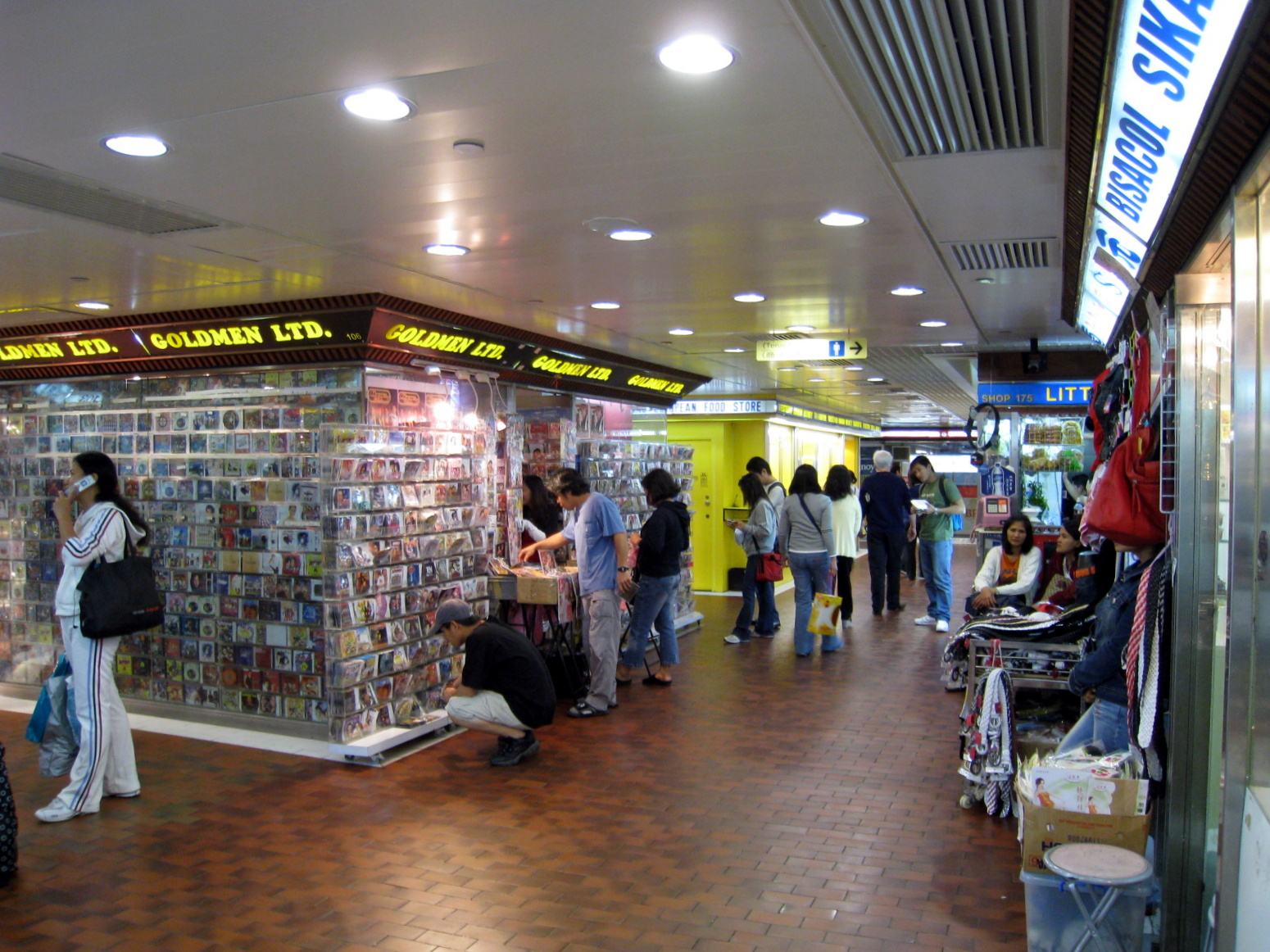
Interior of Worldwide House

World-Wide House is an office building in Central, Hong Kong. It is located between Connaught Road Central, Pedder Street and Des Voeux Road Central.

== History ==
The site is situated on land reclaimed at the turn of the 20th century.

WWH was constructed on a 23,000-square-foot (2,100 m^{2}) site vacated by the former General Post Office, which was located there from 1911 to 1976. The GPO was relocated to Connaught Place for the construction of the Pedder station (later renamed to Central) of MTR. Below the building is the interchange of Hong Kong station and Central station of MTR.

In the early 1970s, there were proposals for the site to be swapped for the Alexandra House plot, to create more open space in Central, and be pedestrianised. The proposals were defeated mainly due to financial considerations.

MTR Corporation, which had been given the first refusal on the site, paid the Hong Kong Government approximately HK$212 million in cash for the rights for the site. The Government ended up receiving some $8,700 per square foot instead of its initial asking price of $10,000.

Cheung Kong, the enterprise founded by Li Ka-shing, obtained the right for the development of the above-ground structure. With a plot ratio of 15:1, CKH built a 32-storey single tower office-cum-commercial building. The arcade is connected to adjacent properties by the Central Elevated Walkway.

== Shopping arcade ==
World-Wide Plaza is the shopping centre on 3 levels on the lower floors of World-Wide House. It is built in an "atrium" style, but without skylight. Its first level is accessible from the Central Elevated Walkway or by escalator from the ground floor of the building.

The kiosks or shop units are typically from around 10 square metres, and are rented out to small traders, who sell telecommunications and banking services, to food, and magazines. The arcade is popular with the large Filipino population, particularly on Sundays, as many of the shops are run by their compatriots. The wide assortment of typically small shops caters to their needs, selling merchandise from their homeland.

== Gallery ==
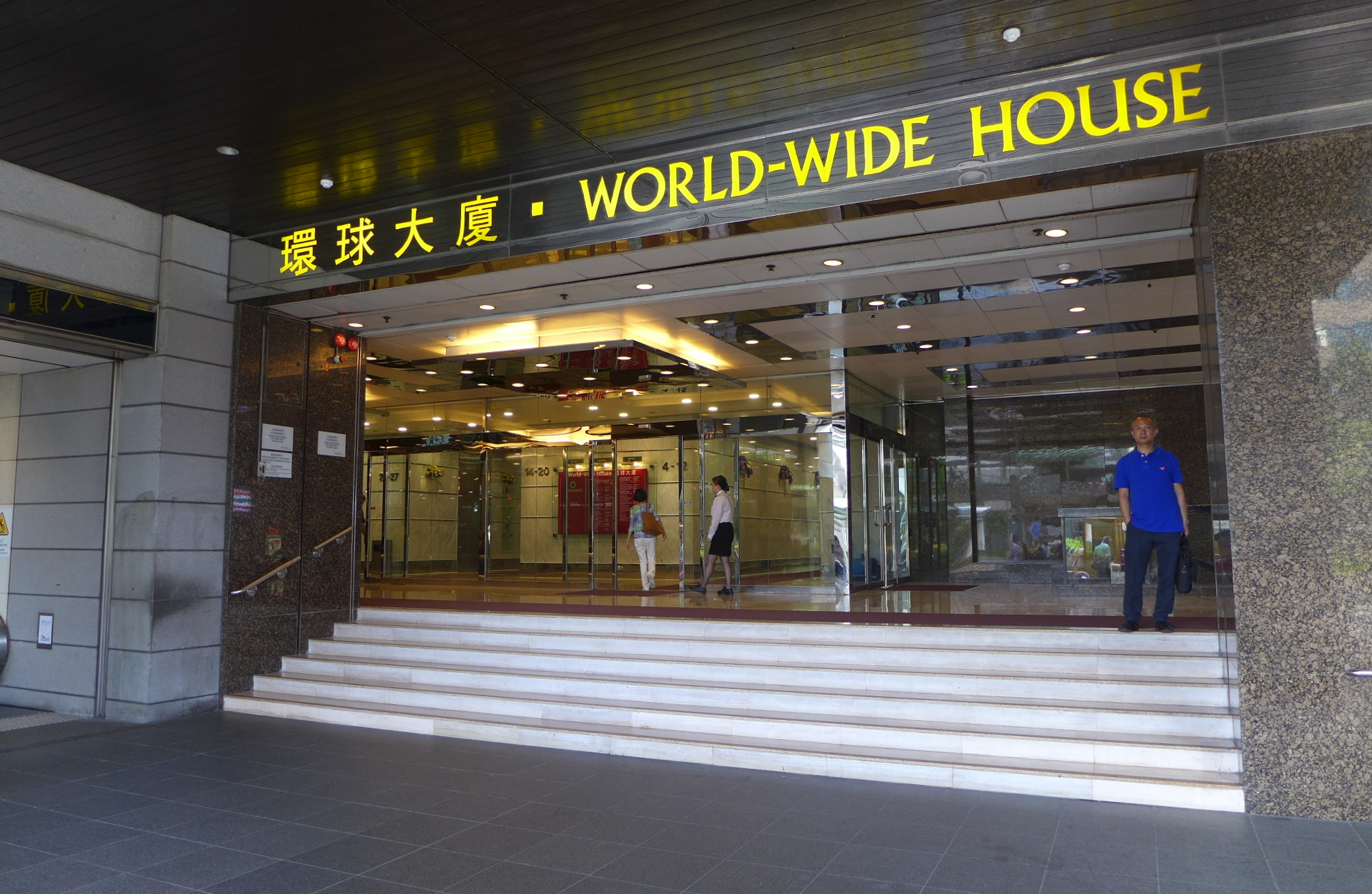
The Office entrance of World-Wide House

Interior of World-Wide Plaza

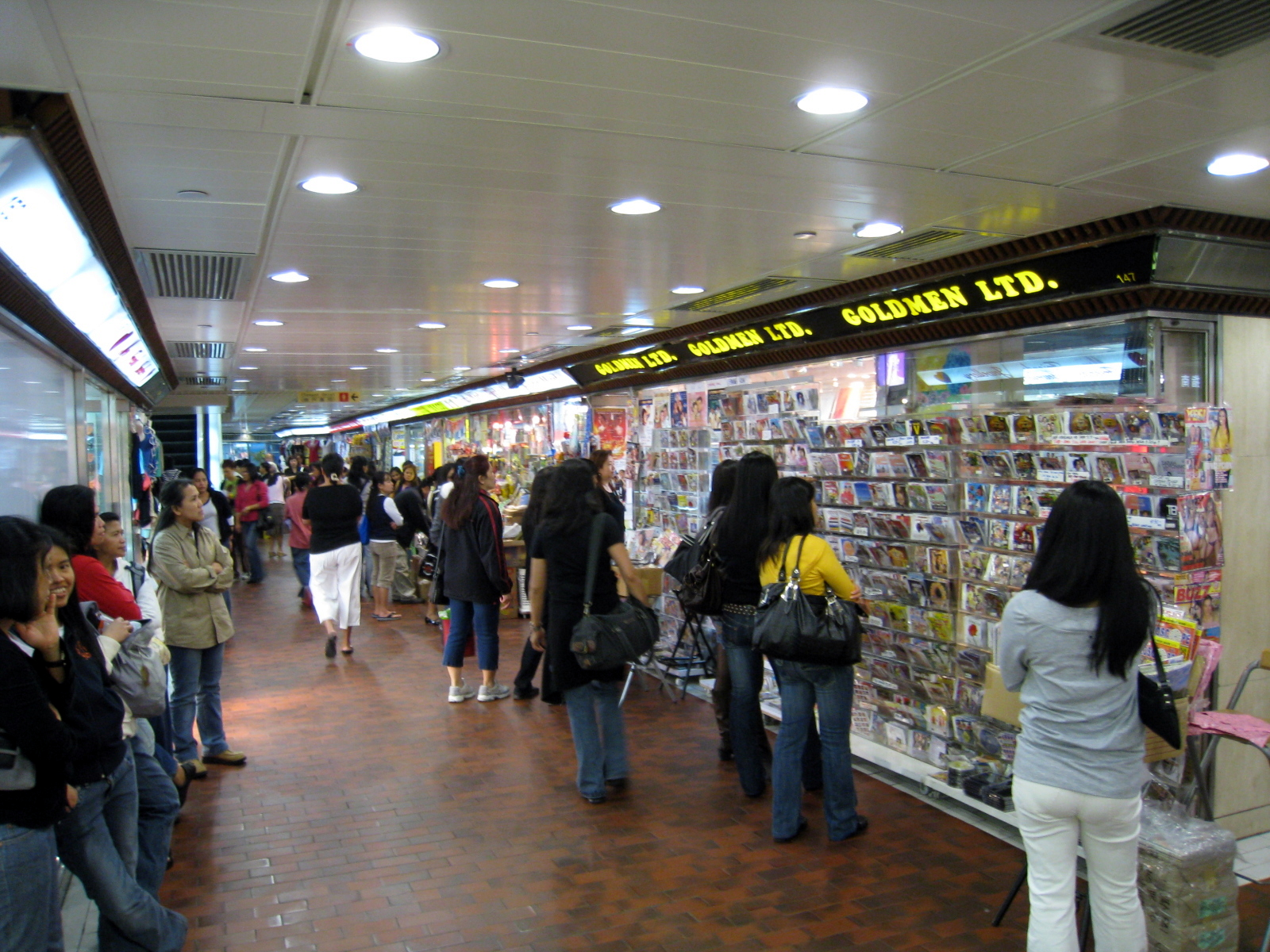
Filipinos selling and purchasing VCDs in World-Wide Plaza, Central.
