= Hong Kong Club Building =

The Hong Kong Club Building
- Chinese: 香港會所大廈
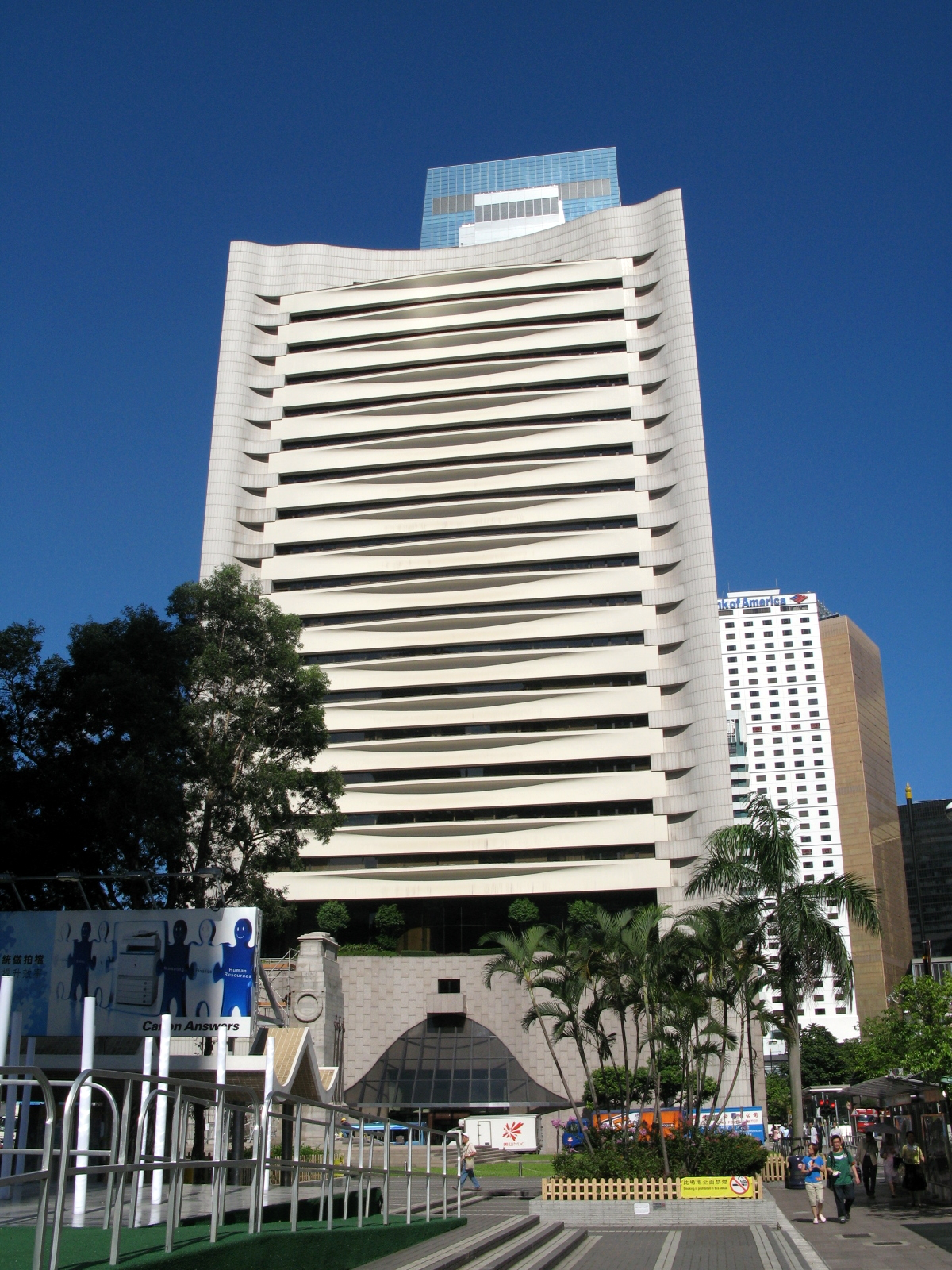
- The third generation (1980) Hong Kong Club Building.
- Interactive map of the The Hong Kong Club Building area

General information
- Type: clubhouse
- Location: 1 Jackson Road, Central, Hong Kong
- Coordinates: 22°16′53.40″N 114°9′39.60″E
- Construction started: 1981; 45 years ago
- Opening: 1984; 42 years ago
- Owner: Hong Kong Club

Technical details
- Floor count: 21

The Hong Kong Club Building (Chinese: 香港會所大廈) is a 25-story office building located in between Chater Road and Connaught Road Central at the junction of Jackson Road, in Central, Hong Kong. The Hong Kong Club Building is currently in its third generation, in its second location. It is owned by the Hong Kong Club, which occupies 8 levels, while the other floors are leased for office use.

The Hong Kong Club Building, in its second incarnation, was one of the last examples of renaissance architecture remaining in Hong Kong. The building was completed in 1897, and demolished in June 1981. It was replaced by the current modern building.

== History ==
=== First generation ===
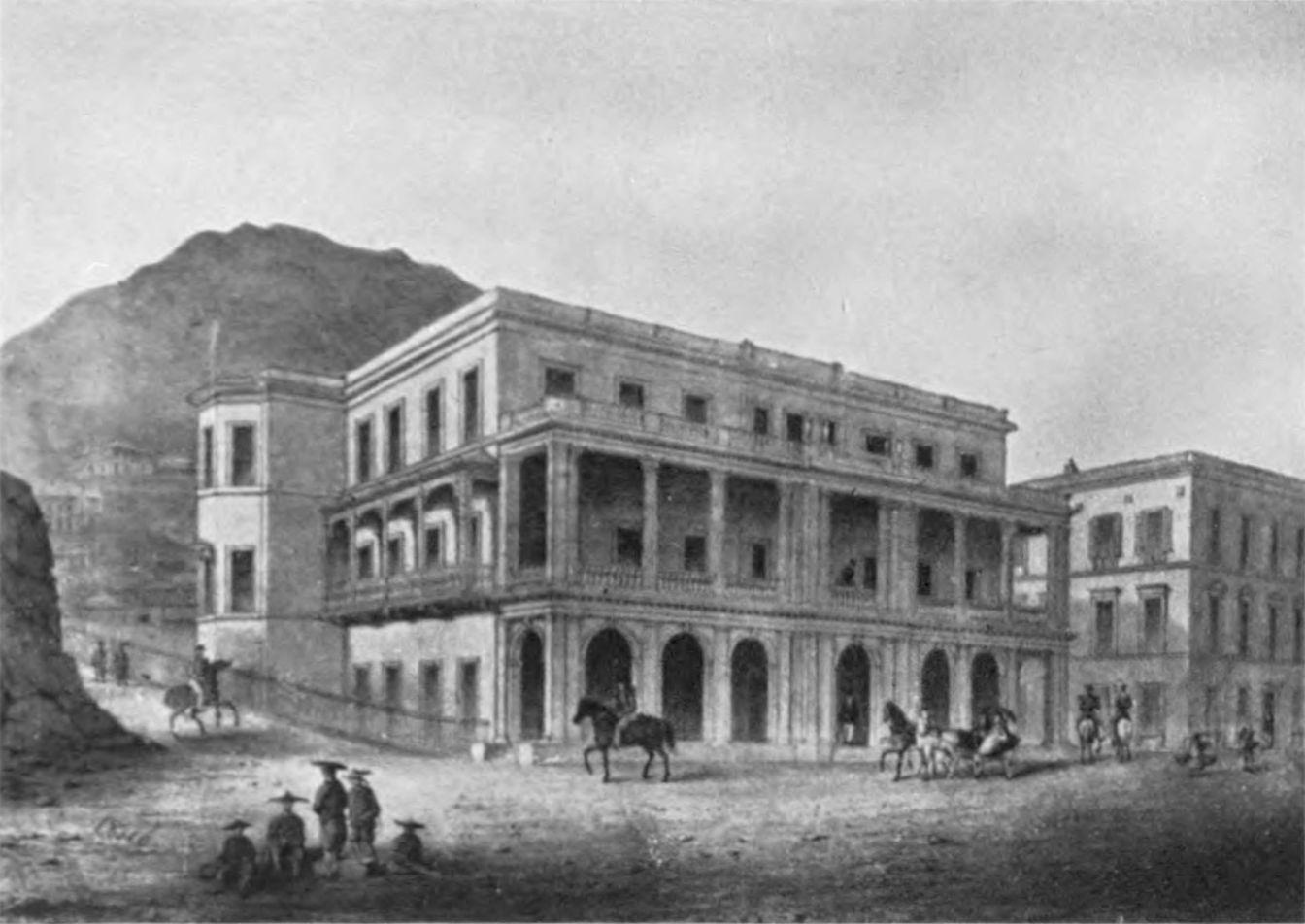
The first location of the Hong Kong Club Building.

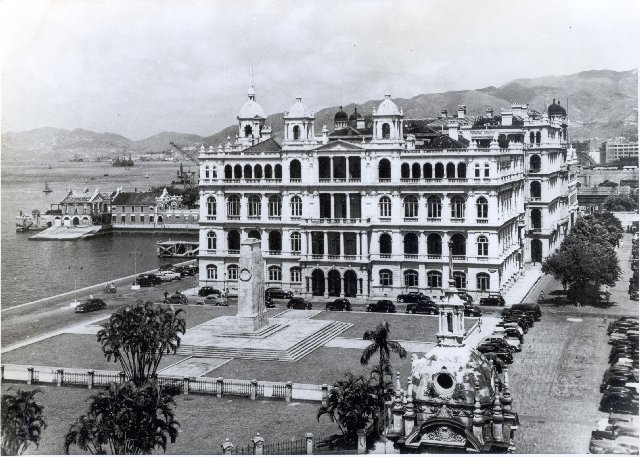
The Hong Kong Club Building in 1928. Cenotaph in front.

Founded in 1846, the Club's first premises were located along Queen's Road Central, from the corner of Wyndham Street to the corner of D'Aguilar Street.

The three-storey building was designed in a classic style. The cost of construction and furniture of £15,000 was raised through an issue of £100 shares.

A chronicle article from 1847 said:

It is a handsome three-storey building and with the out offices covers nearly the third of an acre of ground..."

The interior arrangements are very elegant and reflect great credit on the architect (Mr. S. Strachan) for whose design for the building a premium was awarded.... The entrance hall and grand staircase in the centre supported on fluted columns with capitals in the Corinthian order has a very noble effect...

In 1897, the club moved to more spacious accommodation next to the war memorial, on a sea-front plot of land created by the Central Praya reclamation. The existing building was sold to A. S. Watson & Company, who initially rented it out to the short-lived New club, a club for master mariners. The plot of the first generation Club Building is now occupied by the Entertainment Building.

=== Second generation ===
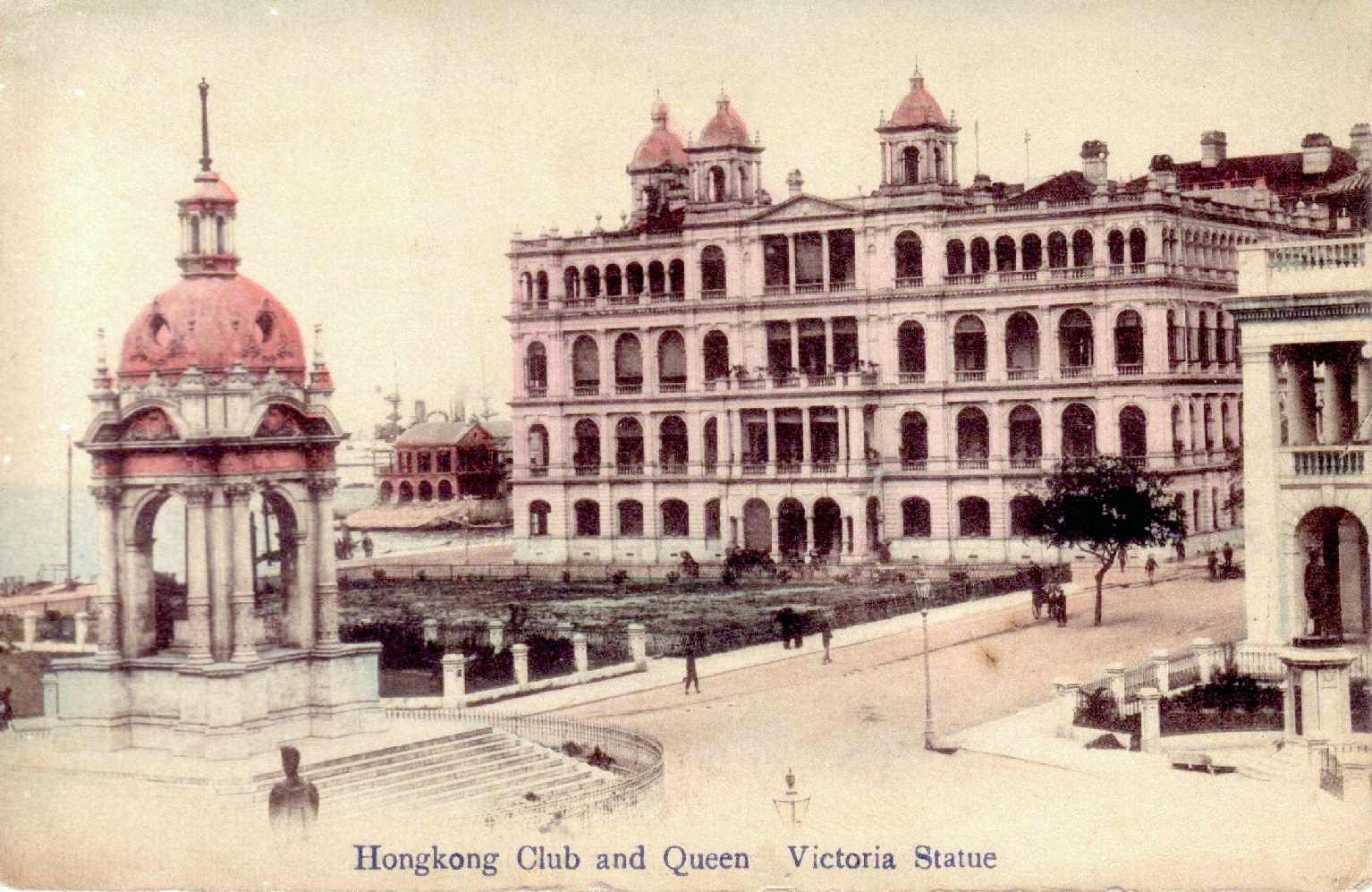
Second generation Hong Kong Club Building and Statue of Queen Victoria, c1905

On 16 February 1895, the Club was granted a 999-year lease on the site under which it had very few restrictions. Rent of $324 was paid annually to the Government. The club building was designed by Palmer & Turner, and was completed in July 1897.

The club held a referendum in around 1974, when the members voted to retain the building and not to redevelop. In 1977 and again in 1978, a demolition plan was rejected by members. The club committee became increasingly alarmist with arguments to redevelop, including the assertion in 1978 that the building was a fire safety hazard; that, in November 1979, it made inflated claims that it would cost HK$25 million to renovate, and eventually won the day.

In 1981, architects who designed the building but who lodged an application to demolish it were quoted as saying that the existing building was old, traditional and would fall to pieces if leaned on heavily. A spokesman said it would "come down like a pack of cards".

==== Preservation campaign ====
To update the club facilities, the members had opted to have the building renovated at a cost of HK$20 million. However, the parlous state of the club's finances tempted the club to explore options to redevelop the valuable site. In 1977, it was reportedly offered HK$200 million for the site by Wardley, part of the Hong Kong Bank.

In around 1978, a campaign at all levels was mounted to save the 82-year-old building.

The Heritage Society also mounted a campaign to stop the demolition of the building. The building was declared a monument by the Antiquities Advisory Board late in 1980. A petition was sent to the Executive Council. On 16 September 1980, the Executive Council decided not to endorse the AAB's recommendation that the Club building be preserved as a monument, citing "unjustified cost to the community" – the cost to taxpayers would be HK$500 million. The decision was denounced by conservationists as being influenced by "powerful vested interests" and against public opinion The Hong Kong Conservancy Association also appealed to the then Governor Murray MacLehose not to undervalue its cultural importance and not to allow the decision to be taken purely on economic grounds. "If even the Government appears to value nothing but money, Hong Kong's youth cannot be expected to have higher standards," said Dr. L. K. Ding, HKCA chairman.

The General Committee of the club was called to task by members, who contested its decision to sign a deal with developers knock down the building and redevelop the site before members had a chance to debate the issue. An EGM was convened to vote on the proposals on 20 October 1980, and the chairman was forced to concede the Heads of Agreement would be subject to members' ratification. Members voted overwhelmingly to proceed with redevelopment.

Hongkong Land was the appointed developer. The club occupied the 25th to 27th floors of World-Wide House during redevelopment. The Victorian building was demolished in June 1981.

=== Third generation ===
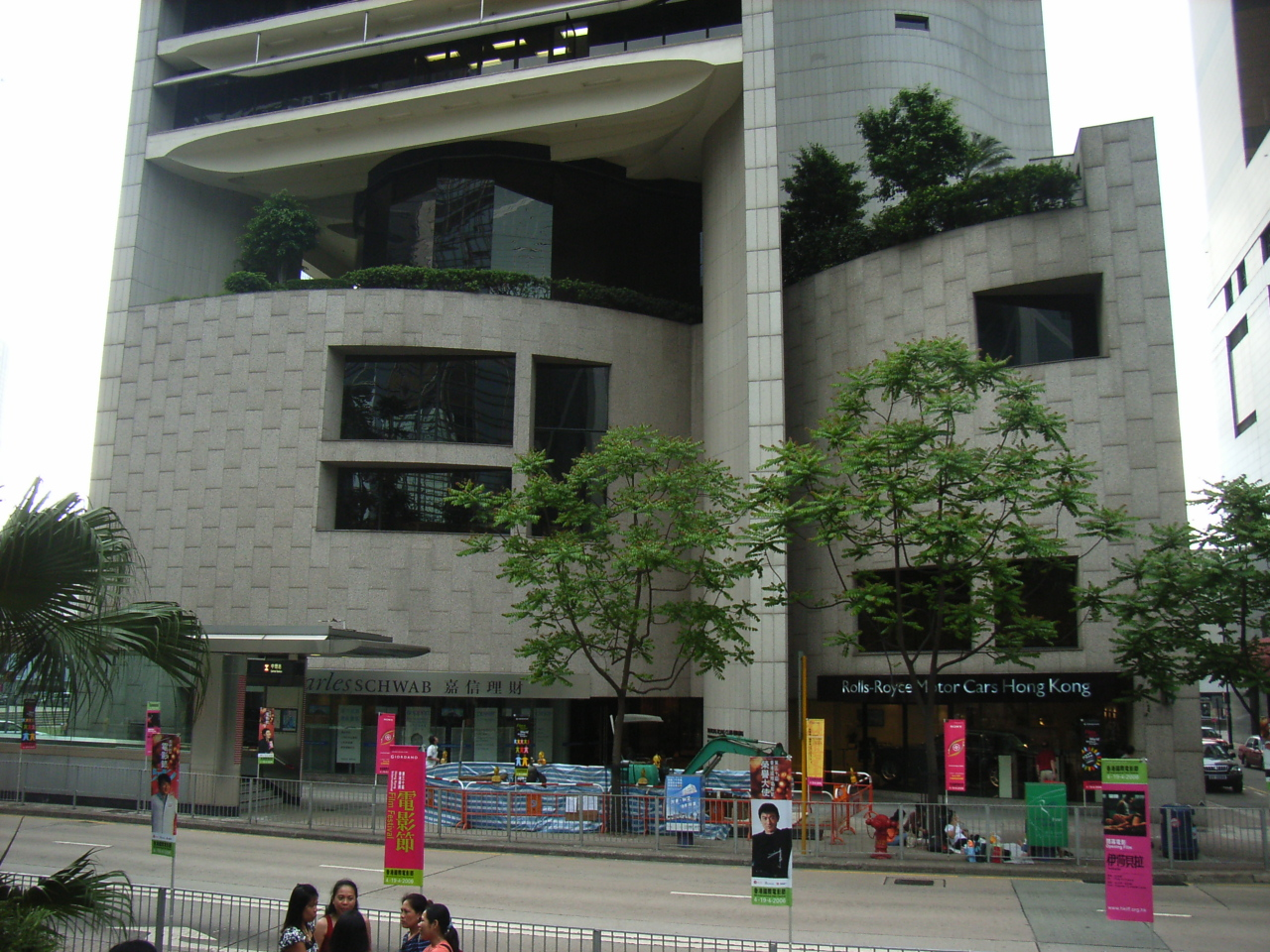
Third generation Hong Kong Club Building viewed from across Chater Road.

The knocked-down building was replaced with a 21-storey building designed by Austrian-born Australian architect Harry Seidler, that was unveiled to the members in December 1980. Hongkong Land agreed to shoulder all demolition and rebuilding costs in exchange for the rental income of the upper storeys for 25 years. 80,000 square feet (7,400 m^{2}) of the new building was to be occupied by the Club – the four podium floors in the new tower would be kept as dining rooms and bars for the members – while the 17 upper floors would be leased for normal office use.

From 2009, the Club took full ownership of the building and to collect all rental revenues, estimated to be HK$100 million a year. A refurbishment took place in 2011, including the Club taking back the sixth floor and converting it into a fitness center, and taking back the retail premises on the north side of the building. More recently, the retail space in the south-east corner of the building were taken back and were converted into a Members' cafe which opened in mid-2021.

The building no longer has any retail space on the ground floor. Floors 7 to 21 are leased to a variety of companies, law firms and other organizations.

== Lease ==
In September 2021, Legislative Council member Paul Tse questioned the 999 year lease of the building for use with only 1500 elite members, asking "given that the HKC building occupies a site in the heart of Central at a low government rent, and that its members are the rich or noble with the general public not being able to enjoy its facilities, whether the Government has assessed if such a situation is outdated and not in the public interest".

== See also ==
- Central and Western Heritage Trail
