= Century Tower I =

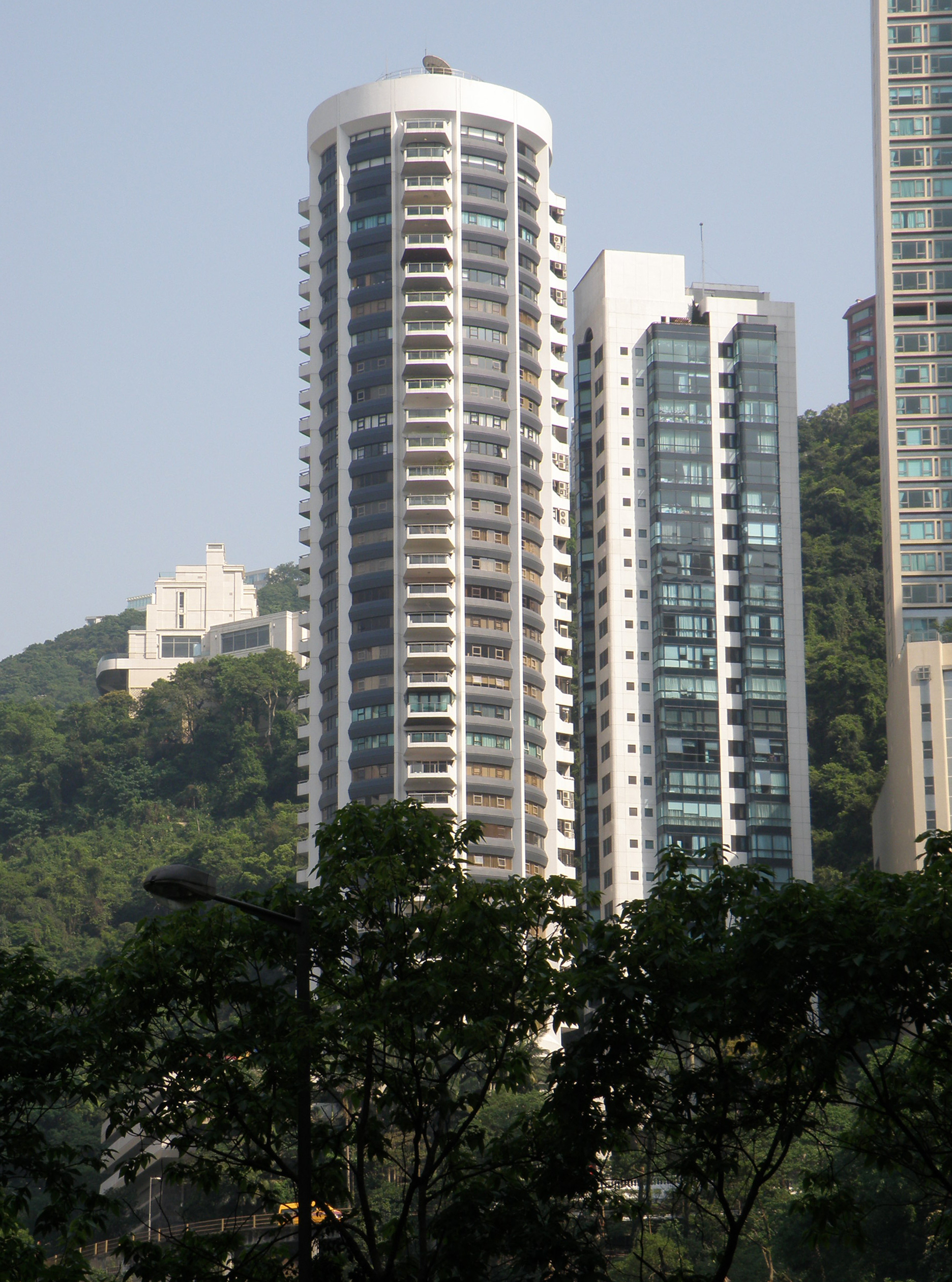

General information
- Status: Completed
- Location: Hong Kong, China
- Completed: 1971
- Height: Roof: 108.5 meters

Technical details
- Floor count: 31

Design and construction
- Architects: P&T Architects

Century Tower I is a 108.5-meter high skyscraper located in Hong Kong, China, built in 1971. It houses 60 residential units on 31 floors. It is one of the oldest skyscrapers in Hong Kong.

The building was designed by Hong Kong-based architectural firm P&T Architects & Engineers.

In 2019, Century Tower I was awarded for the 4T Charter and Energy Saving Charter 2019 issued by the Environment Bureau and Electrical and Mechanical Services Department.
