= Alexandra House =

Office building in Central, Hong Kong

- 歷山大廈
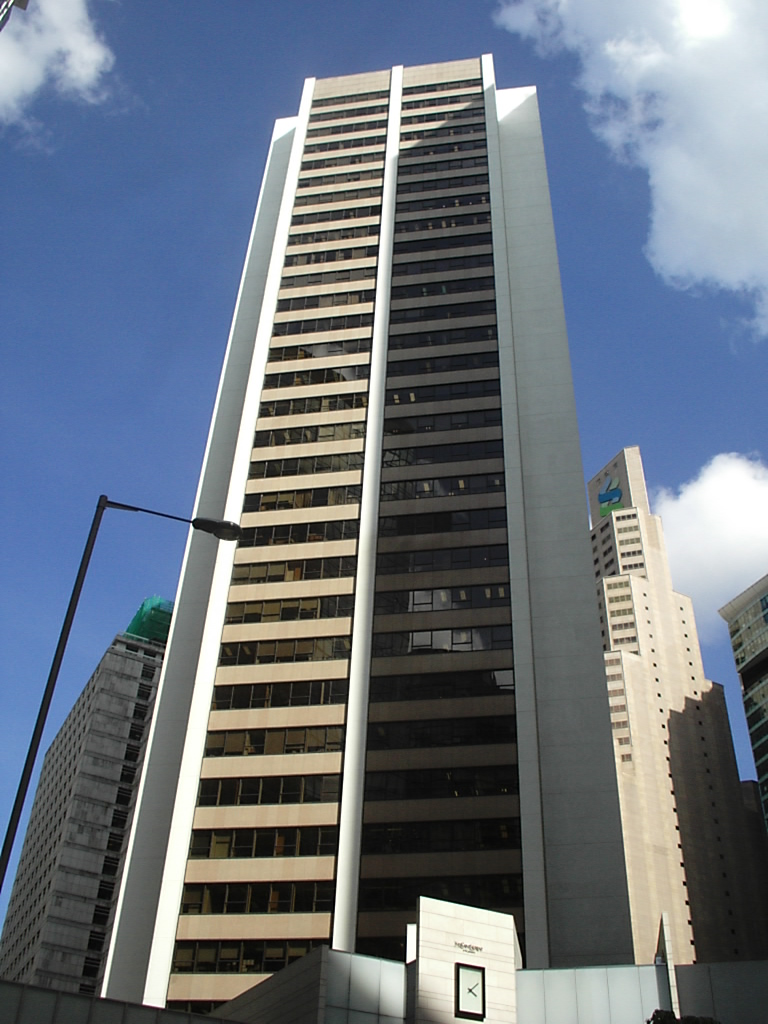
- Alexandra House in 2007

General information
- Status: Completed
- Type: Office, retail
- Location: 16 Chater Road; 5 Des Voeux Road Central
- Coordinates: 22.281676°N 114.158479°E
- Topped-out: May 1976; 50 years ago
- Completed: September 1976; 50 years ago
- Cost: HK$106 million
- Owner: Hongkong Land

Height
- Roof: 124 m (407 ft)

Technical details
- Floor count: 36
- Lifts/elevators: 14

Design and construction
- Architect: P & T Architects & Engineers Ltd.
- Main contractor: Paul Y Construction

Alexandra House
- Traditional Chinese: 歷山大廈
- Simplified Chinese: 历山大厦
Transcriptions
Standard Mandarin
- Hanyu Pinyin: Lì Shān Dàshà
Yue: Cantonese
- Jyutping: lik6 saan1 daai6 haa6

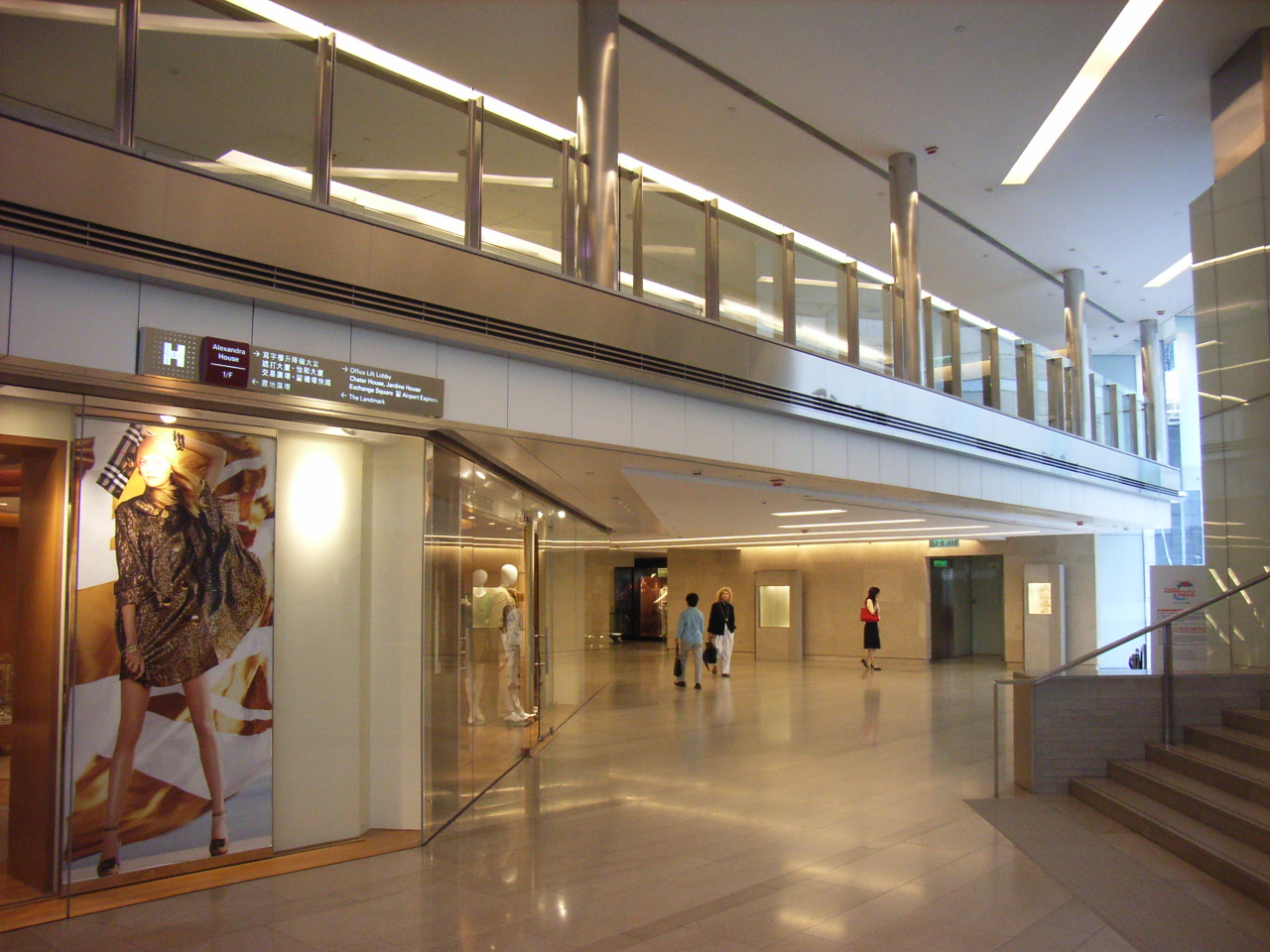
Interior of Landmark Alexandra

Alexandra House (Chinese: 歷山大廈) is an office building in Central, Hong Kong near Central station.

The building has 37 levels. It hosts a shopping arcade, Landmark Alexandra, and it is connected to the Central Elevated Walkway. The block formed by Alexandra house is surrounded by Ice House Street, Des Voeux Road Central, and Chater Road.

== History ==
The current building was completed in 1976. It is the third generation building bearing the "Alexandra" name on this site.

The first generation building, "Alexandra Building", was named after Queen Alexandra, the wife of then reigning monarch Edward VII. It was designed by Palmer and Turner and completed in 1904. The building was five storeys high, with arched verandahs. It was equipped with an Otis electric lift and electric lights installed by the Hongkong Electric Company. It was demolished in 1950.

The second generation building, "Alexandra House", was built in two phases—Phase 1 (on the site of Alexandra Building) between 1950 and 1952, and Phase 2 (on the site of Chung Tin Building and Hotel Cecil) between 1954 and 1956. Demolition started on 29 May 1974.

The current building, a 34-storey tower, was developed by Hongkong Land at a cost of HK$106 million. The plans were approved by the Building Authority in 1975. The tower was constructed by Paul Y. Construction and was the tallest building in Hong Kong to be constructed by slip forming to that date. The tower houses 15 lifts, and the design of the public plaza included the first outdoor escalators in Hong Kong. The building was topped out in May 1976. It received an occupation permit in September 1976.

After the building was completed, Hongkong Land moved their headquarters there.

In 2002, Hongkong Land refurnished the podium of Alexandra House, a new entrance at Chater Road and new retail spaces were created.

In 2012, Hongkong Land launched the brand "LANDMARK", which represents the 4 retail buildings of its Central portfolio, including the retail podium of Alexandra House, which was renamed as Landmark Alexandra.

== Tenants ==
The three Michelin-starred restaurant 8½ Otto e Mezzo is located within Alexandra House. The retail podium, Landmark Alexandra, is occupied by international brands such as Prada, Burberry, Dolce & Gabbana and Ermenegildo Zegna. The commercial building consists of notable tenants and firms such as Christie's, Deacons, Dorsey & Whitney, Howse Williams, Linklaters, Milbank, Sullivan & Cromwell, Holman Fenwick Willan and Weil, Gotshal & Manges.
