= Chater Garden =

Park in Central, Hong Kong

Coordinates: 22.28037°N 114.16100°E

- 遮打花園
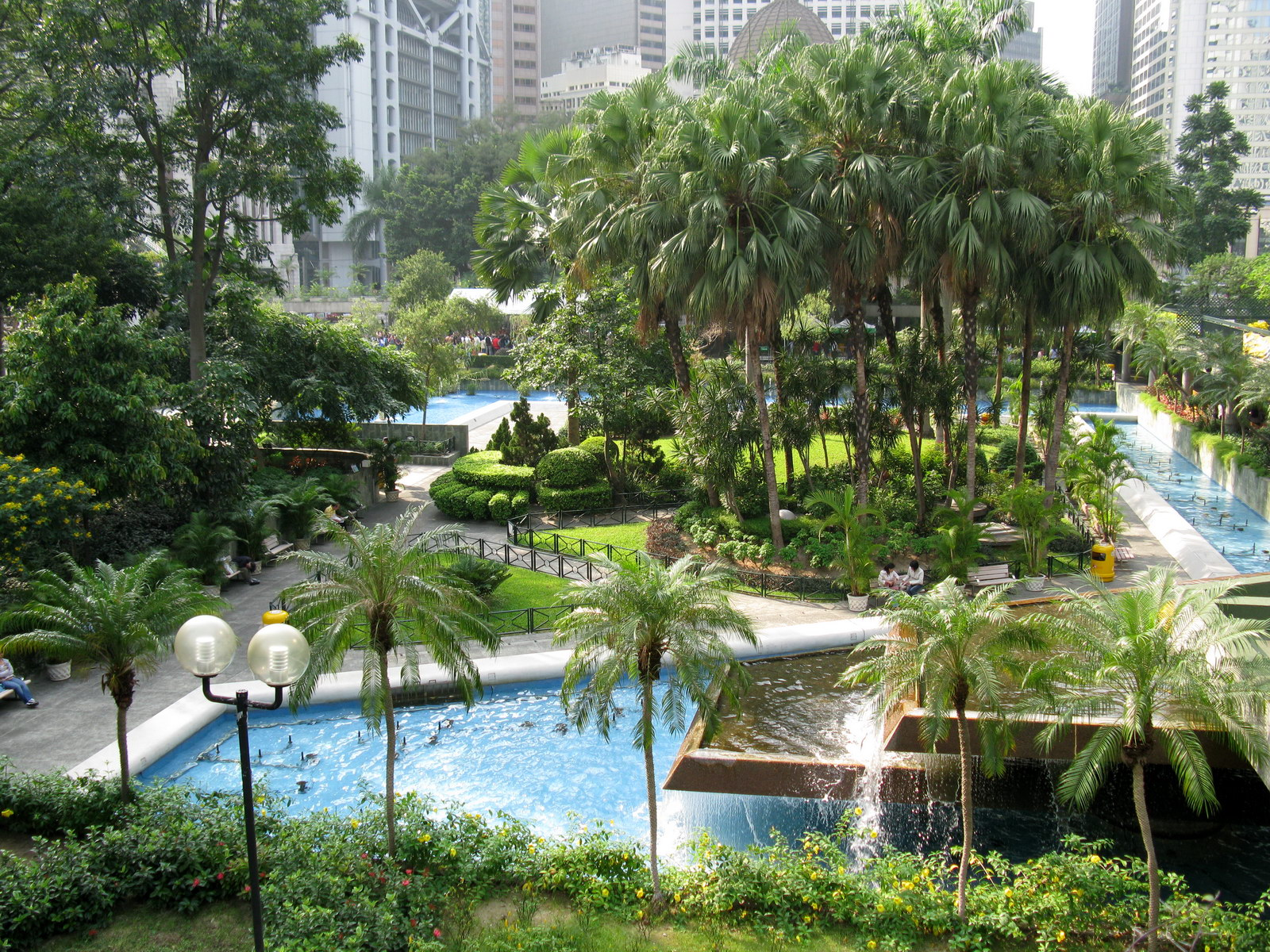
- Chater Garden
- Interactive map of Chater Garden
- Location: Central, Hong Kong
- Established: 20 October 1978; 47 years ago
- Etymology: Named for Sir Paul Chater

Chater Garden
- Traditional Chinese: 遮打花園
- Simplified Chinese: 遮打花园
Transcriptions
Standard Mandarin
- Hanyu Pinyin: Zhēda? Huāyuán
Yue: Cantonese
- Yale Romanization: Jē dáa fāa yùhn
- Jyutping: Ze1 daa2 faa1 jyun4

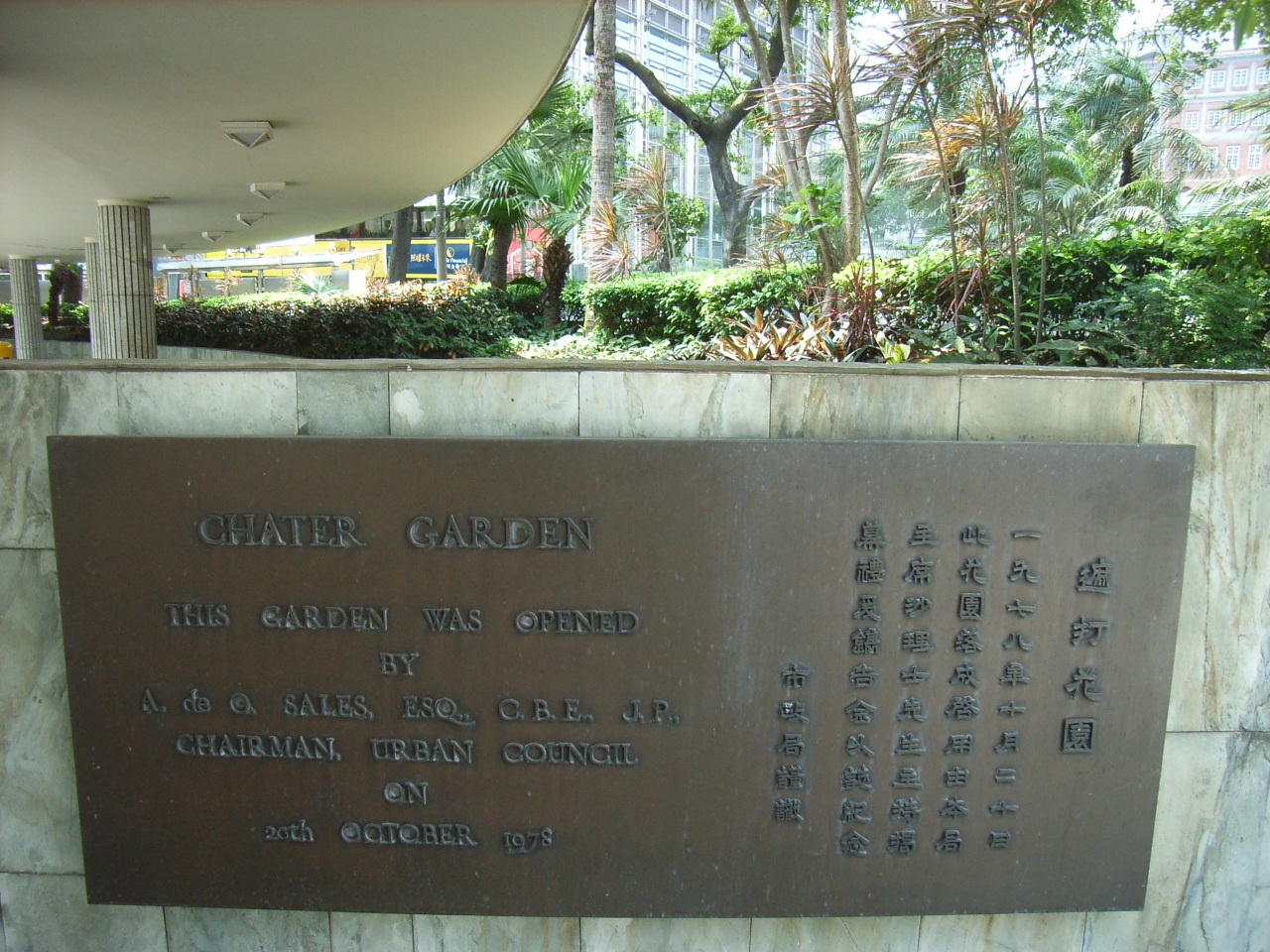
Plaque commemorating the opening of the garden

Chater Garden, located in the Central District of Hong Kong, is a public park directly east of the Legislative Council building. It is named after Sir Paul Chater, as is the adjacent Chater Road.

== History ==
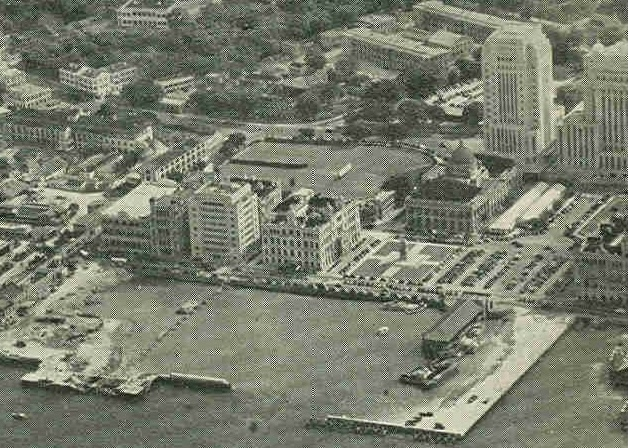
1953 photograph of Central, showing the ground of the Hong Kong Cricket Club behind the Old Supreme Court Building.

In the early days of British rule in Hong Kong, the site was part of the Murray Parade Ground. Then in 1851, it was opened as a sports and recreation area and became home to the Hong Kong Cricket Club and its ground. In 1975, Chater Garden took up the space left by the club when it moved to Wong Nai Chung Gap. The garden was developed in the 1970s, and formally opened on 20 October 1978.

Due to its proximity to the seat of government, the garden has been used as a location for political rallies and demonstrations by groups in Hong Kong such as Falun Gong.

== See also ==
- Central and Western Heritage Trail
- List of urban public parks and gardens in Hong Kong
