= Chater Road =

Three-lane road in Central, Hong Kong

Coordinates: 22°16′52.95″N 114°09′35.35″E

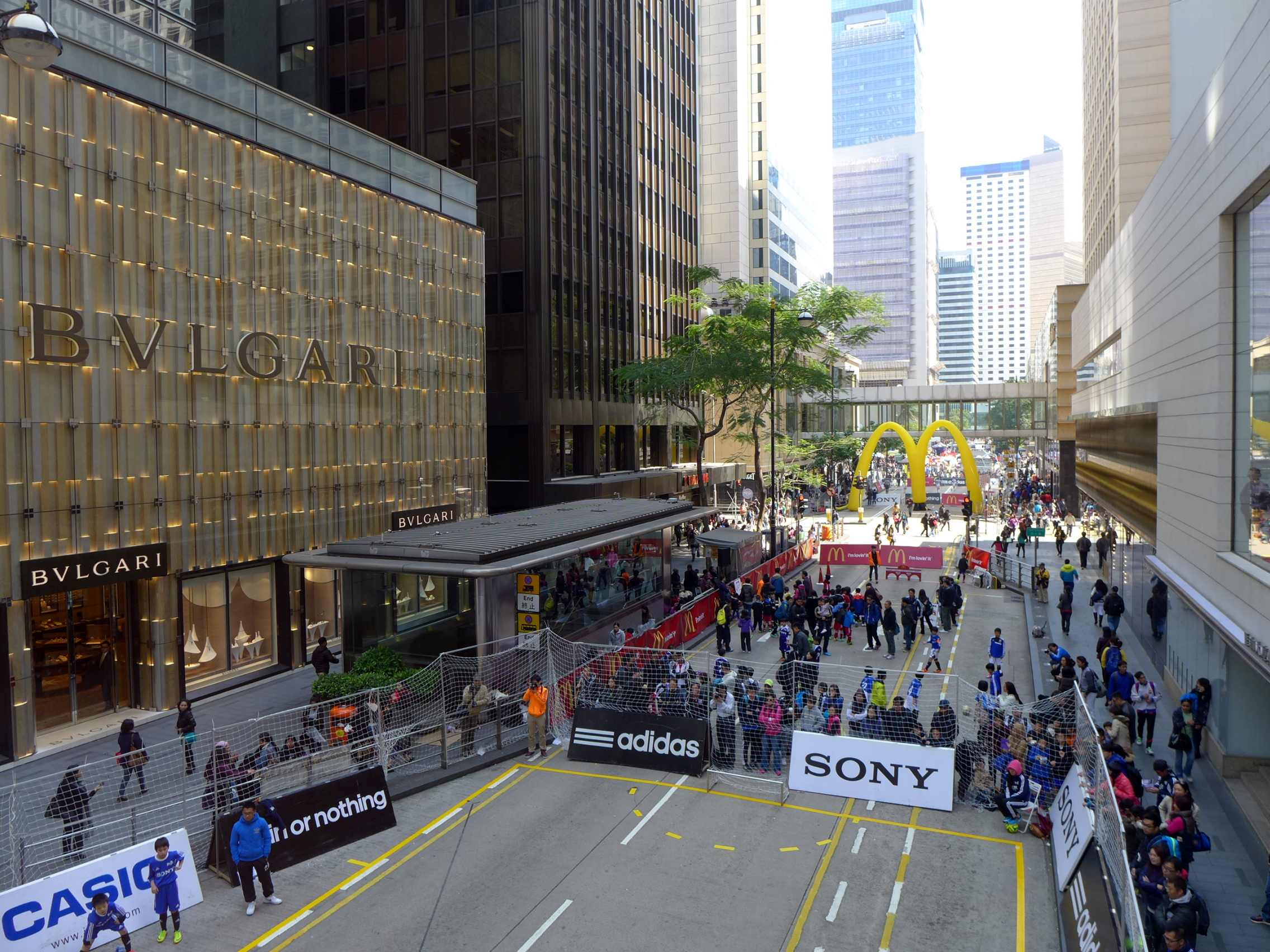
- Chater Road Activities in February 2014
- Chinese: 遮打道
Transcriptions
Standard Mandarin
- Hanyu Pinyin: Zhēdǎ Dào
Yue: Cantonese
- Yale Romanization: Jē Dá Douh
- Jyutping: ze1 daa1 dou6

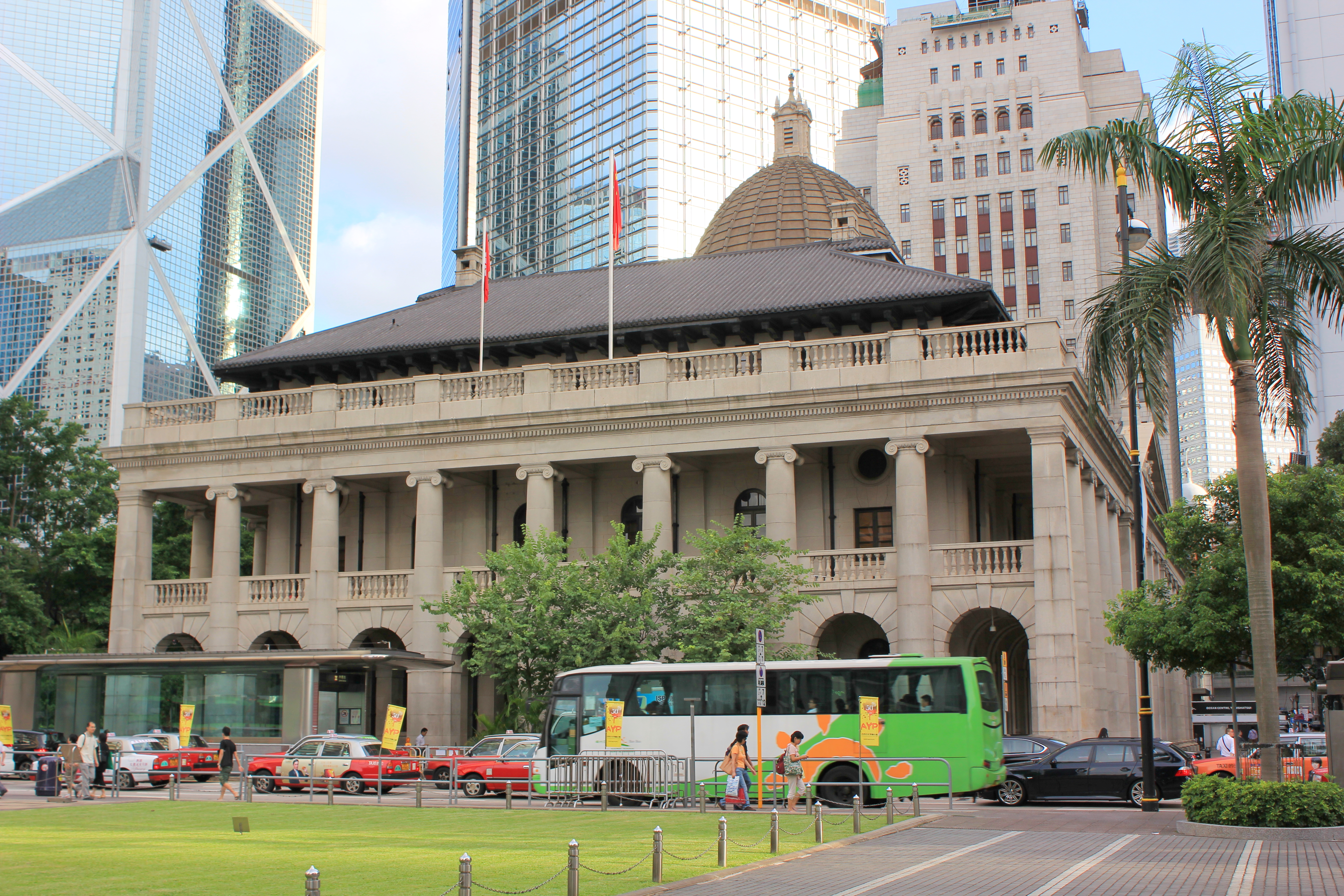
Legislative Council Building, Chater Road in August 2011

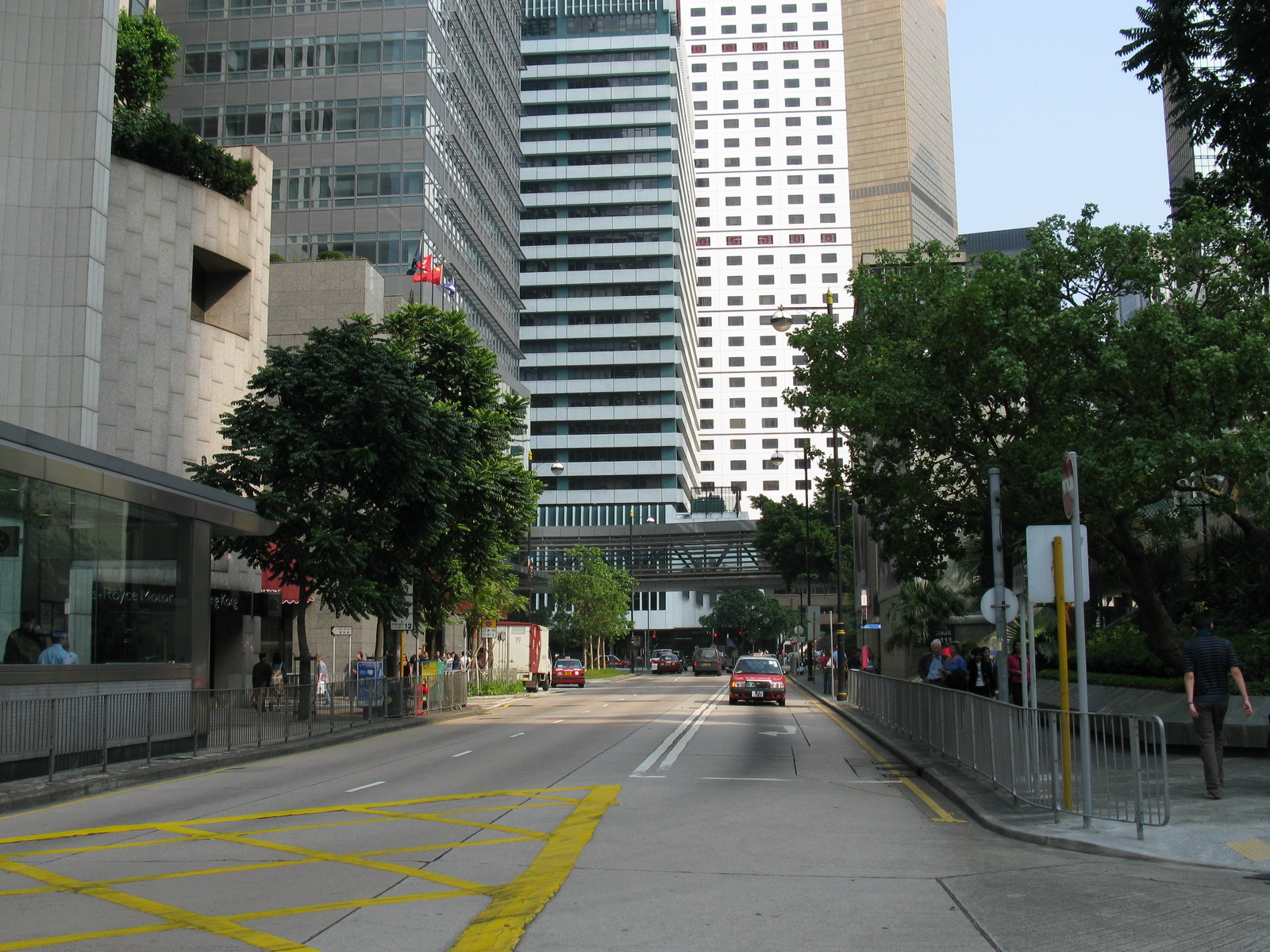
Eastern section of Chater Road in November 2007. The Hong Kong Club Building is on the left, and Chater Garden on the right.

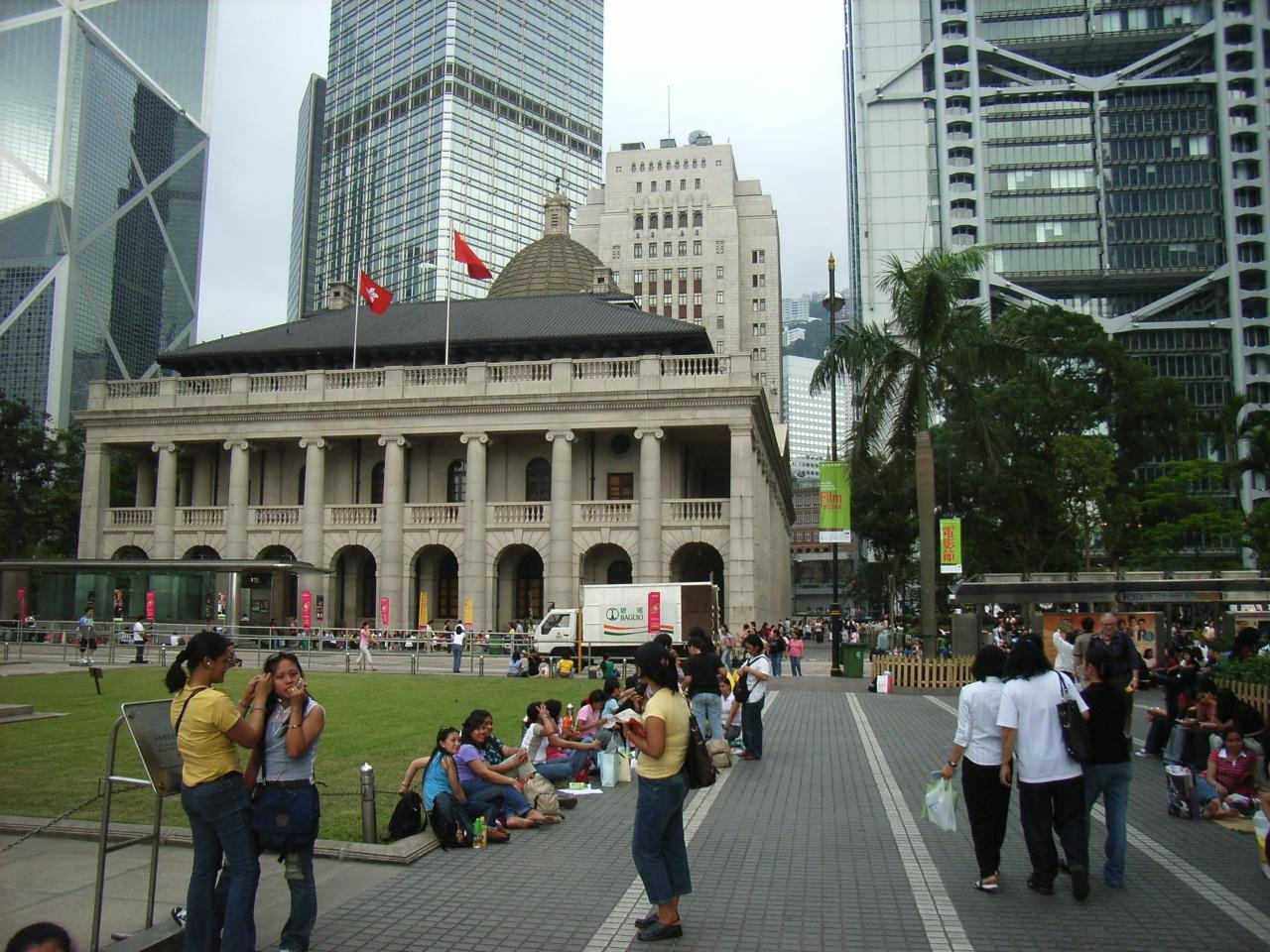
Foreign domestic helpers gathering on the northern section of Statue Square, viewed from Chater Road in May 2006.

Chater Road (Chinese: 遮打道; Jyutping: ze1 daa2 dou6) is a three-lane road in Central, Hong Kong. It begins at its intersection with Pedder Street and Des Voeux Road Central in the west, and ends at Murray Road in the east. It divides Statue Square into southern and northern sections.

== History ==
Chater Road is named after Sir Paul Chater, a leading figure in early colonial Hong Kong, who was instrumental in the Praya Reclamation Scheme which created the reclaimed land on which the road is built. Chater House, owned by Hongkong Land, is located at the western end of the road, which abuts the similarly dedicated Chater Garden, a public square in the middle of the central business district.

== Events ==
Since the growth in the number of foreign domestic helpers in Hong Kong, the road is now usually closed on Sundays and on Hong Kong bank holidays, when the road and the surrounding areas are full of domestic helpers gathering to enjoy their day off work. Impromptu parties with music and dancing are held frequently, and almost all of the people share picnics with their friends.

== Sites along the road ==
Points of interest along the road include (from west to east):

- Chater House
- St George's Building
- Alexandra House
- Mandarin Oriental Hotel
- Prince's Building
- Statue Square
- World War I cenotaph
- Court of Final Appeal Building
- Hong Kong Club Building
- AIA Central (previously AIG Tower)
- Chater Garden (a former cricket ground, and common location for protests)

The former Furama Kempinski Hotel stood on the site of the AIG Tower.

== Public transport ==
Part of the MTR's Tsuen Wan line runs underneath the road, and the Tsuen Wan line station serving the area was originally called Chater in English. It was later renamed Central together with the Island line Pedder station nearby.

== See also ==
- List of streets and roads in Hong Kong
