= Entertainment Building =

High-rise in Central, Hong Kong

- 娛樂行
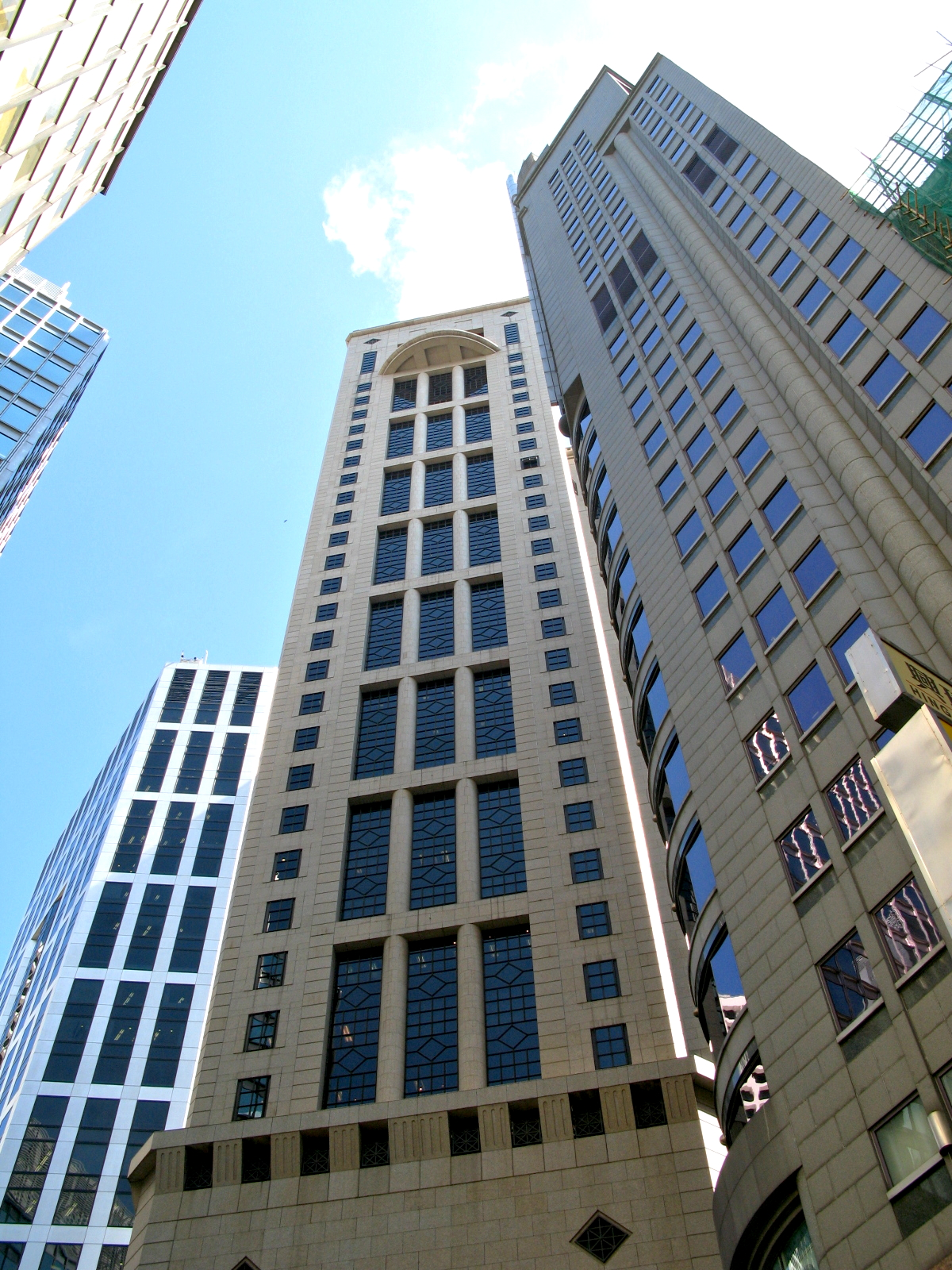
- Entertainment Building (middle)
- Interactive map of the Entertainment Building area

General information
- Status: Completed
- Type: Commercial office
- Location: 30 Queen's Road Central, Central, Hong Kong
- Coordinates: 22°16′53.4″N 114°9′23.5″E
- Completed: 1993; 33 years ago

Height
- Architectural: 186.45 m (611.7 ft)
- Roof: 172.15 m (564.8 ft)
- Top floor: 146.85 m (481.8 ft)

Technical details
- Floor count: 33; 1 below ground
- Lifts/elevators: 12

Design and construction
- Architect: P & T Architects & Engineers Ltd.

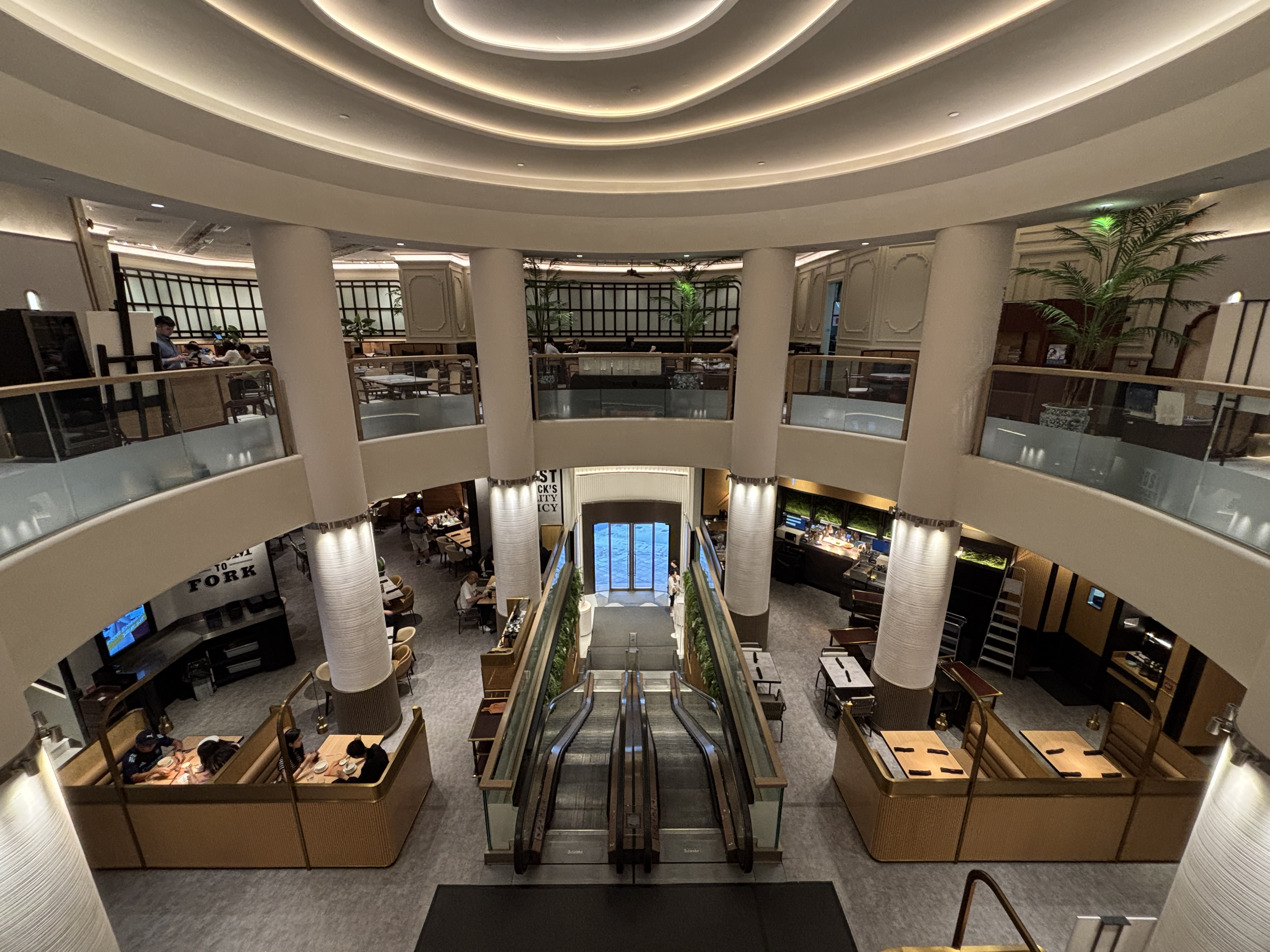
Interior of Entertainment Building.

Entertainment Building (Chinese: 娛樂行) is an office building in Central, Hong Kong Island, Hong Kong. The neo-gothic architecture and height of the building make it distinctive amongst the office buildings nearby. The building stands at 30 Queen's Road Central and occupies an area of 5,800 square feet (540 m^{2}) between Wyndham Street and D'Aguilar Street. It faces the Aon China Building (怡安華人行) and overviews Pedder Street. It has a total gross floor area of 210,000 square feet (20,000 m^{2}).

== History ==
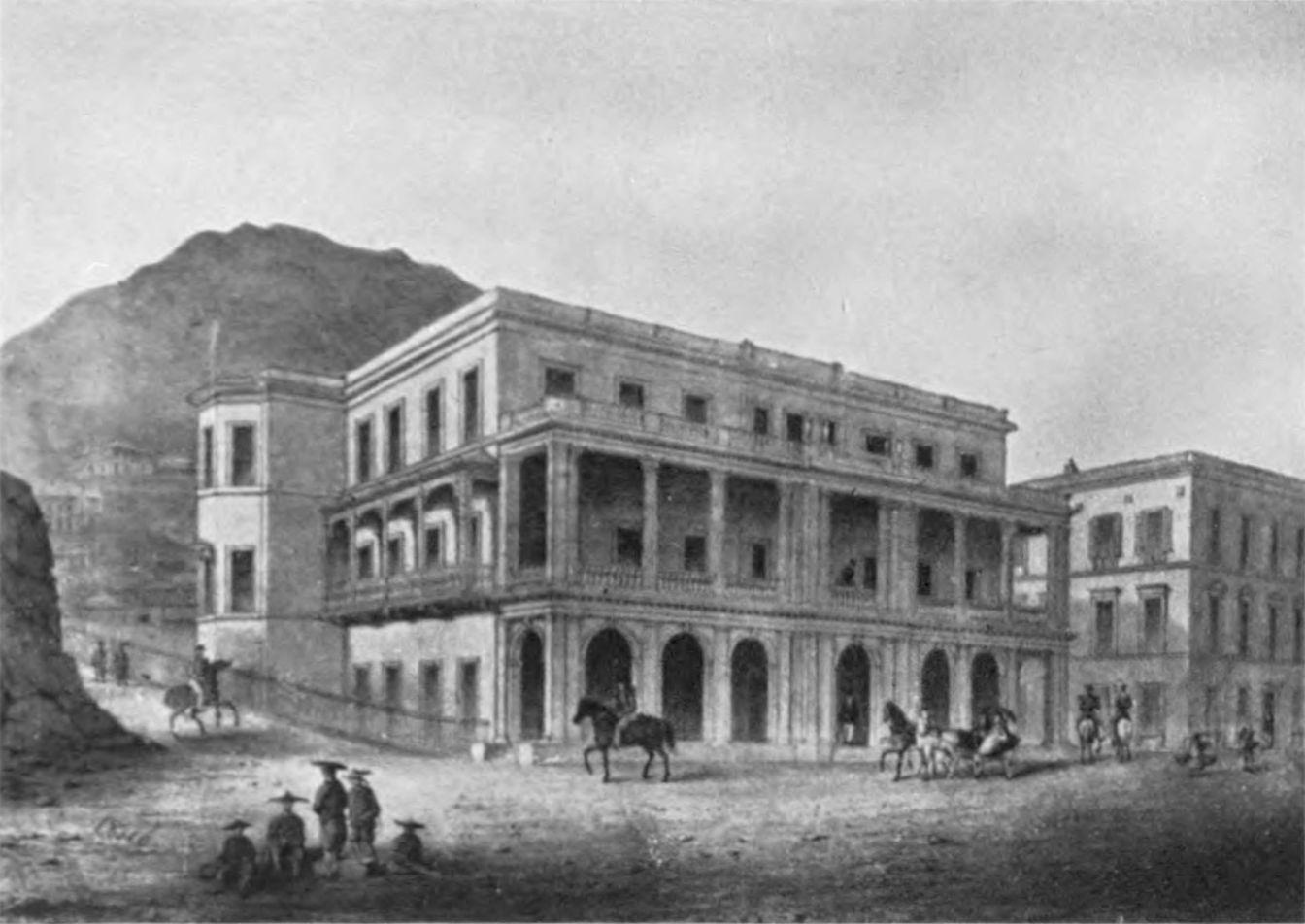
The first generation of Hong Kong Club that stood on its site

Completed in 1846, the first building on the site was the first generation of the Hong Kong Club. After the club moved to its current location at 1 Jackson Road in 1897, the building turned into commercial use, the largest tenant was Yee Sang Fat.

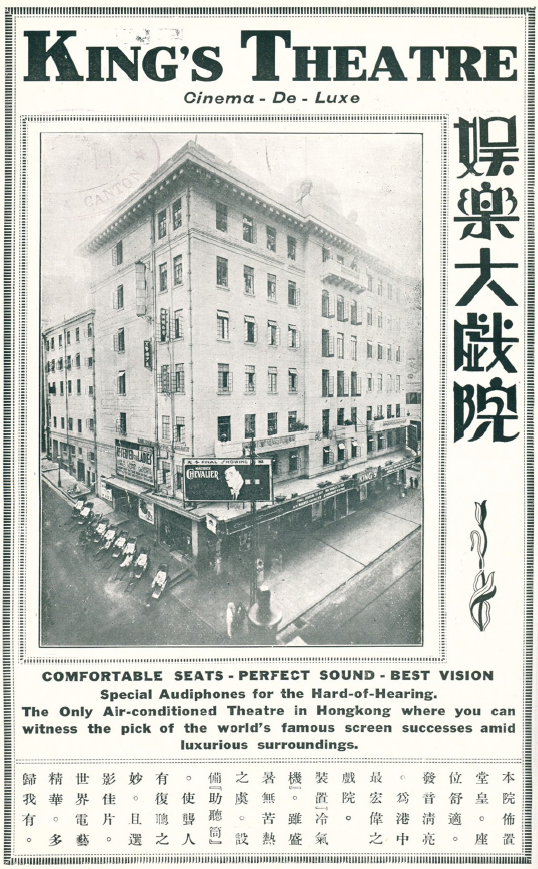
Advertisement of King's Theatre, 1931

In 1928, the building, along with the Coronet Theatre at its back, were demolished to make way for the construction of the air-conditioned King's Theatre (娛樂戲院). It featured a ballroom as well as a restaurant. The theatre opened to business on 31 March 1931 with Ernst Lubitsch's Monte Carlo.

The theatre closed on 1 September 1962 with a Walt Disney film and was replaced by the second generation of King's Theatre. The rebuilt King's Theatre opened to business on 21 December 1964. It had 1,302 seats. The theatre was in turn closed on 1 January 1990 and was rebuilt into the present building.

== Ownership ==
In November 1996, Hysan Development Holdings agreed to buy the building from Chinese Estates Holdings, for $3.64 billion, an average price of about $17,300 per sq ft.

In 2005, Hysan announced that it would sell the building for $2.7 billion.

== See also ==
- List of tallest buildings in Hong Kong
