= Hong Kong Club =

Gentlemen's club in Hong Kong

The Hong Kong Club (Chinese: 香港會) is a private members' club in Central, Hong Kong, the oldest in the city. Opened on 26 May 1846, it is a private business and dining club in the heart of Central, Hong Kong. Its members were (and still are) among the most influential people in the city, including such personalities as government officials, local businessmen, the heads of the major trading firms, and many legal and accounting professionals. It was often referred to simply as "The Club". The club's first premises were situated on Queen's Road at the junction with D'Aguilar Street.

The 2026/27 Chairman is Stephen Li who succeeded Anthony Souza. The General Manager is Patrick Behrens.

== History ==
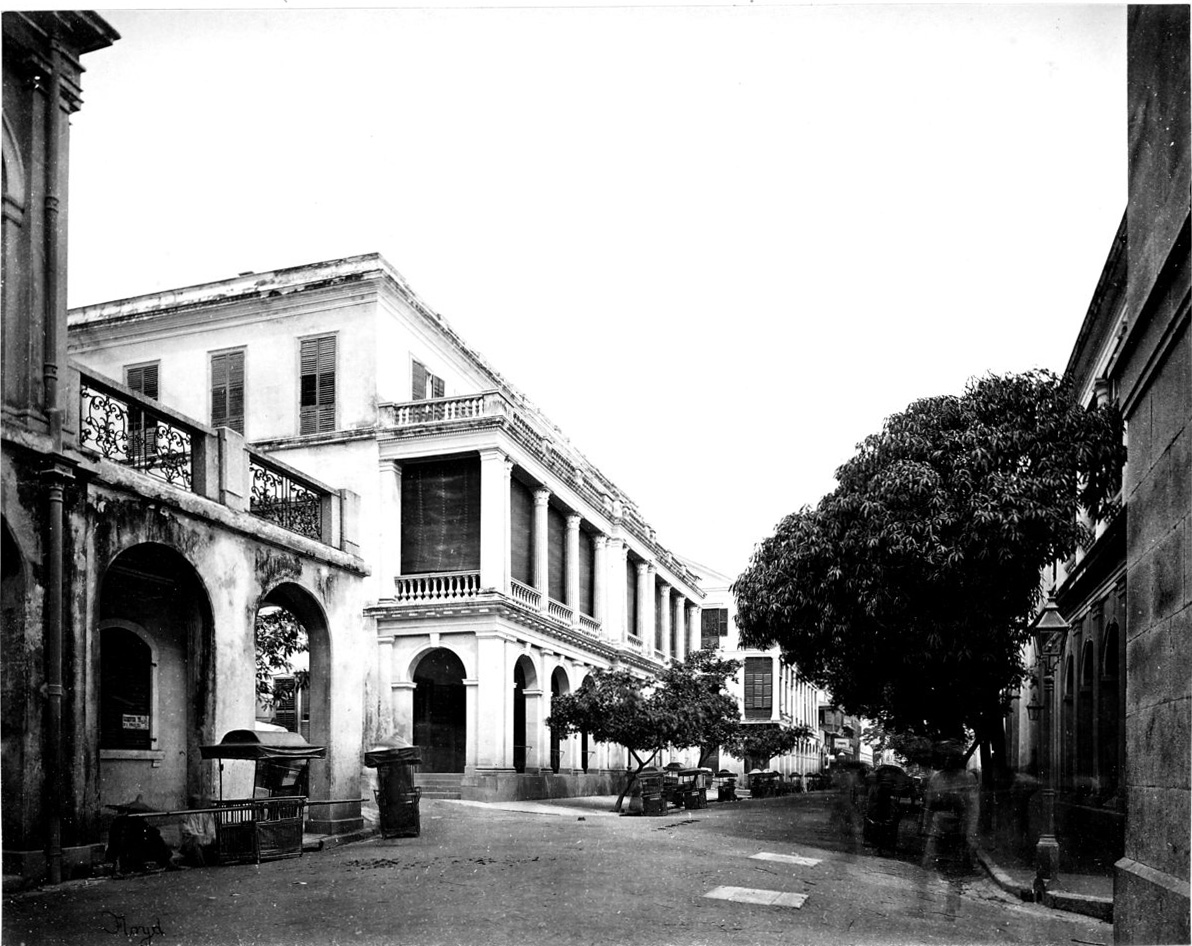
Hong Kong Club c. 1873 at the corner of Wyndham Street and Queen's Road.

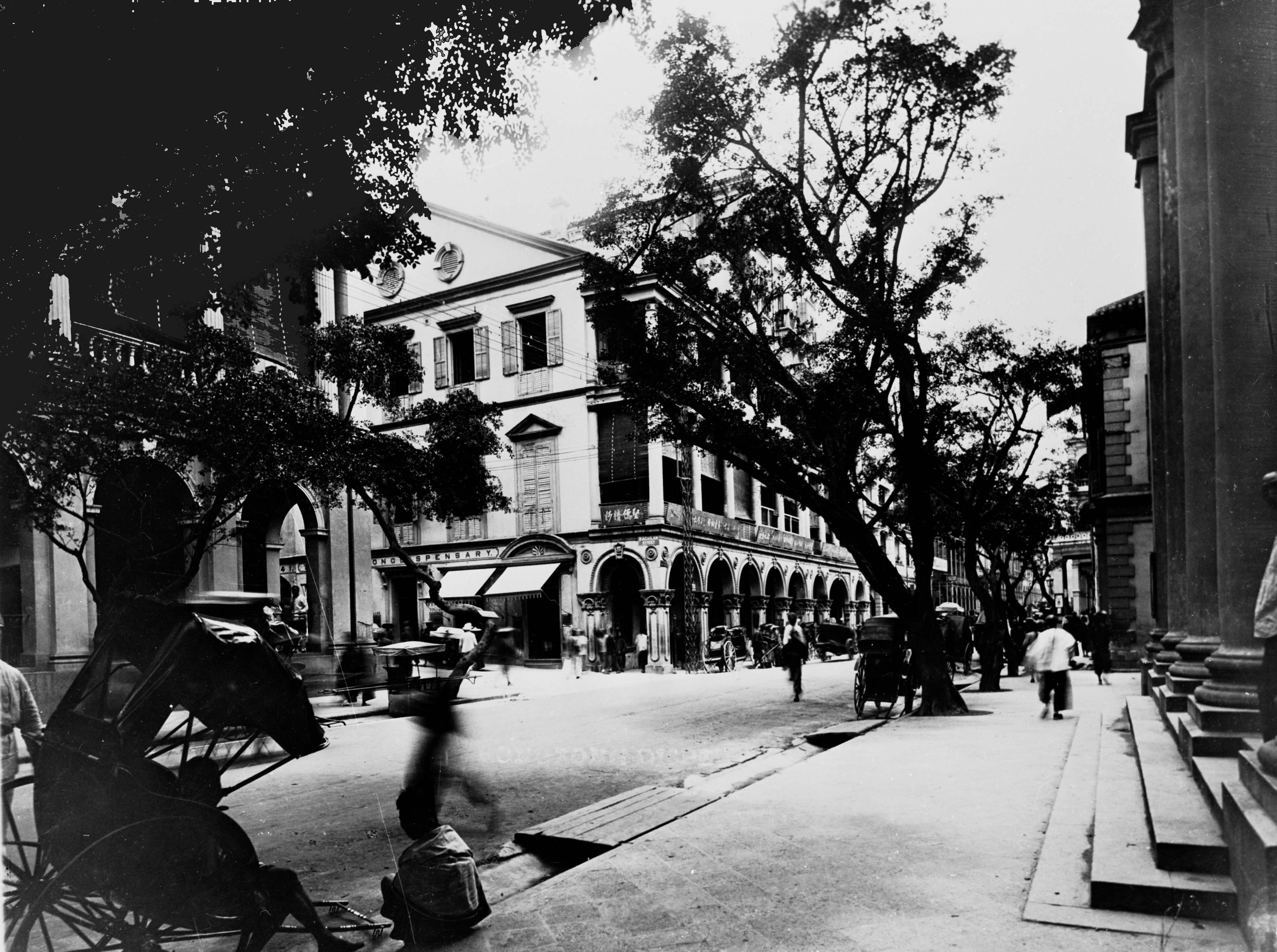
Hong Kong Club in 1890 at the corner of D'Aguilar Street and Queen's Road, opposite the Supreme Court (It is the building on the left, not the one in the centre).

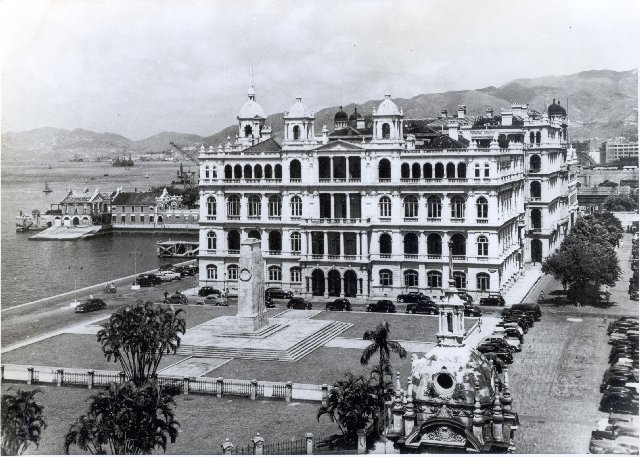
Second generation Hong Kong Club Building in 1928.

The Club was an exclusive gentlemen's club set up by British merchants and civil servants, to "create a greater community of feeling among these classes". At the outset, an entrance fee of HK$30 was payable, and monthly subscription fees of $4 were charged quarterly in advance. Facilities included guest rooms charged at $1 per night, dining rooms and bars, and a billiards room.

The Club was historically described as the seat of real power in Hong Kong. It was a place where the governor and senior civil servants would hold discussions with business elites. In 1877, the Club witnessed an intrusion by a British soldier who was enraged by the privileges of the official and merchant classes. The lone assailant wandered into the club brandishing a sword, swinging it at the lamps and chandeliers, and menacing members saying "You're one of them".

The Club moved into its second-generation clubhouse on Jackson Road in 1897, and the former premises became home for the short-lived 'New Club', a residential club whose members were almost entirely master mariners. The current clubhouse, remaining at 1 Jackson Road, represents the third-generation Club's premises.

Governor Sir Cecil Clementi (1925–1930) believed the club to be too exclusive, and suggested abolishing it and replacing it with a club whose membership would be open to all races.

In May 1981, a group of members trying to preserve the Victorian clubhouse built in 1897 called an extraordinary general meeting with a motion to wind up the Club and distribute its assets. The motion was rejected by a 451–147 vote.

In 2016, the Club set out its history in a book entitled Kindred Spirits.

In 2026, the Club celebrated its 180th Anniversary, marking a significant milestone in its distinguished history.

== Membership ==
Rules of membership were strict: Membership was restricted to British merchants and civil servants, women and people of unsuitable background being banned.

Membership remained exclusive to Europeans until the membership rules were eased in the late 1970s. Some parts of the club premises were off-limits to women. One former member is quoted as saying "there was nothing in the rules to say that Chinese couldn't join. It had simply been understood that you didn't put a Chinese up for membership". There were reportedly only a few Chinese members as recently as in the early 1980s. The Sex Discrimination Ordinance, which came into force in 1996, eventually forced its doors open to women.

The Club reportedly had 1,218 members on its membership register in 1981. In 2007, the Club had some 1,400 members, of which 70% are expatriates.

In 2026, the Club has approximately 1,600 resident members and approximately 270 full-time staff.

In 2015, the Club established The Hong Kong Club Foundation for charitable purposes. The Foundation is separately managed from the Club and John Budge has served as its chairman since its establishment. Each year, HKCF supports non-governmental organisations in Hong Kong, focusing on the elderly, disadvantaged youth and the ethnically diverse.

== Clubhouse ==
The Hong Kong Club Building is currently in its third generation, in its second location. Prior to its redevelopment during the 1980s, the Hong Kong Club Building was famous for being one of the last examples of Victorian architecture in Hong Kong. The first clubhouse was constructed on the corner of D'Aguilar St and Queen's Road. The cost of its construction, together with furniture, of £15,000 was financed through an issue of shares of £100 each.

On 16 February 1895, the Club was granted a 999-year lease on the current site, and a new clubhouse was completed there in 1897.

The Club currently occupies eight floors (LG2, LG1, Ground, 1st, 2nd, 3rd and 4th floor, and a Sports and Wellness Centre on the 6th and 7th floors) of The Hong Kong Club Building. Facilities include a billiards room, bowling alleys, squash courts, golf simulator, library, card room, and dining and bar facilities.
