= P&T Group =

Architectural firm in Hong Kong

Coordinates: 22.2922°N 114.2067°E

P&T Group 巴馬丹拿集團 巴马丹拿集团

Practice information
- Founded: 1868; 158 years ago
- No. of employees: 1400+
- Location: Hong Kong; Singapore; Shanghai; Dubai; Abu Dhabi; Riyadh; Bangkok; Ho Chi Minh City; Shenzhen; Macau; Kuala Lumpur; Jakarta

Significant works and honors
- Buildings: Exchange Square; Jardine House; Standard Chartered Bank Building; Burj Rafal
- Projects: Over 7,000 finished

Website
- https://www.p-t-group.com/

P&T Group (Chinese: 巴馬丹拿), formerly known as Palmer and Turner Hong Kong (Chinese: 公和洋行; "Kung Wo Yeung Hong"), is an architectural firm in Hong Kong. It is one of the oldest architecture and engineering firms in the world and it has designed numerous buildings across Asia, Africa, and the Middle East.

== History ==
Based in Hong Kong, P&T claims its roots when architect William Salway set up his own practice on 1 October 1868. Herbert William Bird, a partner of the firm from 1901 to 1928, was also a member of the Legislative Council of Hong Kong. Hong Kong public records suggest that Palmer & Turner arose out of Palmer & Bird – a prominent firm at the time whose senior partner was Lennox Godfrey Bird, younger brother of HW Bird. It is known that Clement Palmer, then only 23 years of age, designed the first Hong Kong and Shanghai Bank Building in 1883. Arthur Turner, a structural engineer, joined the firm in 1884. From 1891 onwards, the name Palmer and Turner was kept, despite the arrival of new partners.

During the late 19th and early 20th centuries, the practice was very active in colonial Hong Kong, and in Shanghai, which was a treaty port at the time. A Shanghai office of Palmer and Turner was opened in the mid-1920s, and it designed many important buildings that constitute the Old Bund in Shanghai, including the Peace Hotel. Following a rule change by the architects' professional body, HKIA, in 1981, after which full liability partnerships could incorporate, the practice was incorporated and renamed P&T Group in 1982. Its holding company, which owns all its offices premises and practices, was transferred into a trust protecting its owners, with rules determining dividends, and the reinvestment of profits within the company.

The company's fortunes have waxed and waned over the years. During the Asian financial crisis, its headcount was pruned from 800 employees down to 450. In China, business has fallen from its peak in the 2000s, when the mainland accounted for over half its revenues, to less than 30 per cent, the firm shrunk from some 2,000 employees to just over 1,600. Heinz Rust, one of the P&T directors responsible for the changes at the time, said the new company was "streamlined" to suit expansion plans. The company expanded internationally since around 2000, opened new offices in Dubai (2004), Abu Dhabi (2007), Ho Chi Minh City (2008), Chongqing (2012), Indonesia (2014), Shenzhen (2016) and Riyadh (2018).

=== 1860s–1900s: Early years ===
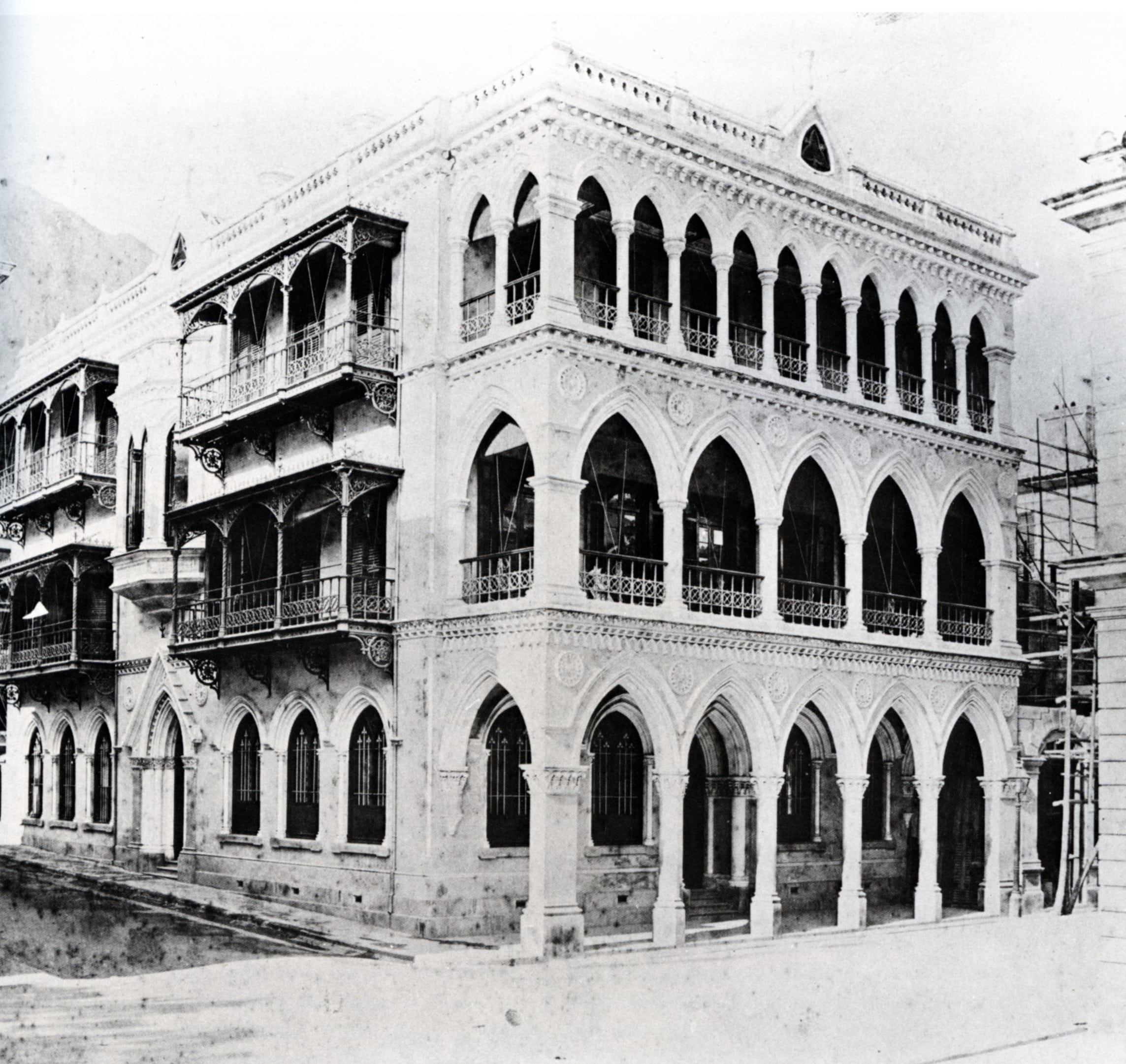
Chartered Bank, Hong Kong

The origins of the P&T Group date back to 1868, with founder William Salway's arrival in Hong Kong from Australia, to establish a design practice in response to the demand for grander buildings. In 1880s, the Beaconsfield Arcade was completed, Hong Kong's first multi-storey shopping centre. Architect, Clement Palmer and structural engineer Arthur Turner joined the partnership. In 1890s, the company name changed to Palmer & Turner, the name remained for nearly a century.

=== 1900s–1950s: Growth and expansion ===
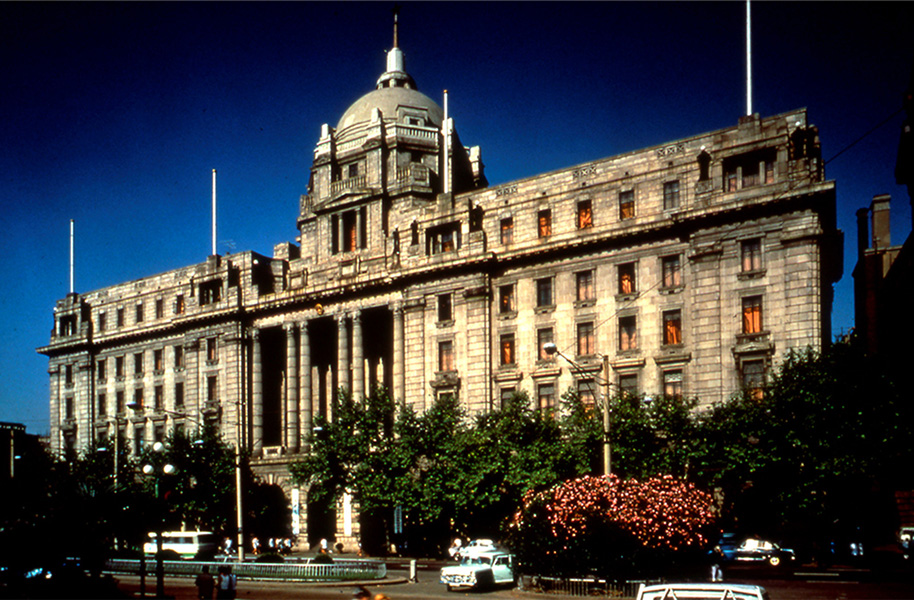
HSBC Shanghai

In 1920s, the Shanghai office was opened. Saturation piling was introduced to allow buildings to rise above three storeys. The Hong Kong Shanghai Bank was completed on the famous Shanghai Bund. The Shanghai Customs Building was completed, establishing a distinctive "Shanghai Style".

In 1930s, the Peace Hotel and the Bank of China were completed as iconic additions on Shanghai's Bund. Hong Kong Shanghai Bank Headquarters was completed, being the first fully air-conditioned building in Hong Kong, and the tallest structure in South East Asia, at the time. India and Malaya offices were opened. Sultan of Johor's Palace was completed. The Shanghai and other offices were closed due to World War II.

In 1940s, the Hong Kong office was reopened after World War II. The iconic Jardine House was completed in Hong Kong.

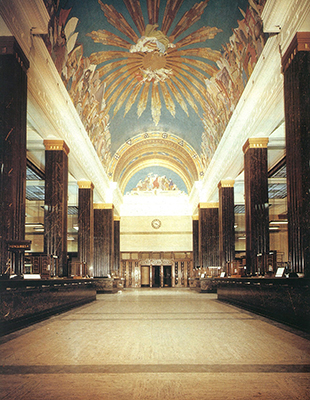
Interior HSBC Shanghai

=== 1950s–2000s: Incorporation and success ===
In 1950s, the new Chartered Bank and Bank of China buildings were completed, continuing the firm's "Shanghai Style". The grand Goodwood Park Hotel was completed in Singapore, reflecting a distinctive South East Asian tropical style.

The Hilton Hotel, Choi Hung Housing Estate and AIA Building were completed in a modern style in 1960s, the latter two winning the Hong Kong Institute of Architects award.

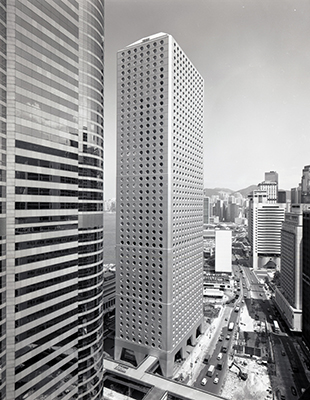
Jardine House, Hong Kong

In 1970s, the Connaught Centre (now known as Jardine House) was completed, Hong Kong's first skyscraper, tallest building in Asia at the time and heralded the revitalisation of the Central District. The Hong Kong Polytechnic University at Hung Hom was completed, the highest density campus in the world at that time. The Singapore office was opened.

The company name changed to P&T Group in 1980s, the name remaining to this day. Award-winning Exchange Square in Hong Kong's Central District was completed. The Bangkok, Taipei, Kuala Lumpur and Jakarta offices were opened. Jinling Hotel and Bank Negara were completed, the tallest building in China and Indonesia respectively at the time.

In 1990s, Hong Kong modern landmarks such as the new Standard Chartered Bank, Entertainment Building, CITIC Tower and Central Tower were completed. China landmarks such as the Oriental Plaza in Beijing, Harbour Ring Plaza, Citic Square and Raffles City in Shanghai were also completed. Shanghai office was opened.

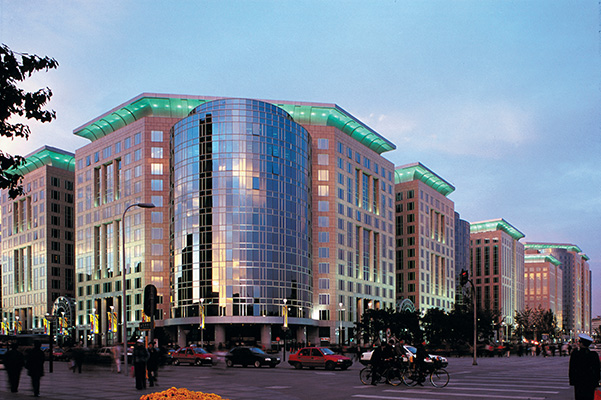
Oriental Plaza, Beijing

=== 2000s–present: Global growth ===
Middle East and Vietnam offices and additional China offices were opened. The firm global employees reached 1000 in 2007, now about 1600.

P&T Group has expanded from a small firm to one of the largest international consultancies globally. It now has 14 offices in China, Singapore, Thailand, Middle East, Vietnam, Indonesia, and Malaysia; a team of more than 1600 architects, engineers, and designers; and projects carried out worldwide in over 100 cities. In 2018, P&T donated a collection of historical architectural archives to the University of Hong Kong and M+ Museum.

In June 2024, P&T Group was among ten companies to receive the (Building and Construction Information) BCI Asia Top 10 Architects Award.

== Projects ==
=== Hong Kong ===
Notable commissions in Hong Kong include:

- Hong Kong Club Building (second generation, 1897)
- Mountain Lodge (second generatio] (1903) House]] (first generation, 1904)
- Rosary Church (1905)
- Netherlands India Commercial Bank (1906)
- Victoria Theatre (1911)
- No. 27 Lugard Road (1914)
- Rutton House (1923)
- Shek-O Clubhouse (1924)
- Hop Yat Church (1926)
- The Falls (1928)
- St. Stephen's College (1929)
- SCMP Building (1932)
- Pedder Building (1932)
- Ko Shing Theatre (1932)
- Bank of Canton Building (1932)
- War Memorial Hospital (1932)
- Kau Yan Church (1932)
- Bank of China Building (Hong Kong) (1933)
- HKSBC Head Office (third generation, 1935)
- Maryknoll School & Convent (1936)
- Hillcrest Apartments (1937)
- Eu Gardens (1938)
- Marina House (1939)
- Holland House (1939)
- Hong Kong Hilton (1963)
- Jardine House (1972)
- Hong Kong Polytechnic University (1972)
- Exchange Square (1988)
- Standard Chartered Bank Building (1990)
- Hong Kong Science Museum (1991)
- Entertainment Building (1993)
- Central Elevated Walkway (1970s–2000)
- Hong Kong Design Institute (2007)
- Harrow International School Hong Kong (2012)
- Jao Tsung-I Academy (2012)
- Hong Kong Velodrome (2013)
- SKYPARK (2017)
- Malvern College Hong Kong (2018)
- The Quayside (2018)
- Ying Wa Girls' School (2019)
- K11 ATELIER King's Road (2019)
- Novo Land (2023)
- Redevelopment of St. Paul's Hospital (2024)
- Shanghai Xujiahui ITC (2025)

=== Mainland China ===
Notable commissions in mainland China include:

- Peace Hotel, Shanghai (1926–29)
- Shanghai Dream Center (2018)
- Fuzhou Poly Hilton DoubleTree Hotel, Fozhou (2023)
- Ningbo One Central, Ningbo (2026)

=== Singapore ===
Notable commissions in Singapore include:

- Rediffusion Building, Clemenceau Avenue (1948–49)
- MacDonald House, Orchard Road (1949)
- Sandes Soldiers Home, Portsdown Road (1949)
- Odeon Cinema, North Bridge Road (1953)
- Bank of China Building, Battery Road (1953)
- Clementi NorthArc
- 15 Holland Hill (2022)

=== Taiwan ===
Notable commissions in Taiwan include:

- Far Eastern Plaza, Taipei (1994)
- Polaris Garden, Taipei (2007)
- King's Town Hyatt, Kaohsiung (2009)
- Panhsin Twin Towers, New Taipei (2009)
- BELLAVITA Shopping Center, Taipei (2009)

=== Macau ===
- Bank of China (1991)
- One Grantai, Hotel (2011)
- Novo Park (2014)
- The Paragon (2015)
- The Residencia Macau and Crowne Plaza Hotel (2015)
- Pedestrian System at Guia Hill (Tunnel) (2022)

=== Thailand ===
- Park Ventures Ecoplex, Bangkok (2012)
- Vanissa Building, Bangkok (2020)
- The ParQ, Bangkok (Phase 1 - 2020)
- Kronos Sathorn, Bangkok (2021)
- Grande Centre Point Space Pattaya, Pattaya City (2022)
- Grande Centre Point Surawong, Bangkok (2023)
- JLK Tower, Bangkok (2023)
- Mochit Complex, Bangkok (2025)

=== Dubai Studio ===
- Burj Rafal, Riyadh (2014)
- FIVE Hotel Resort and Residences, Dubai (2017)
- InterContinental Ras Al Khaimah Mina Al Arab Resort & Spa, Ras Al Khaimah (2021)
- Dubai CommerCity, Dubai (Phase 1 - completed, Phase 2 - on-going)
- City of Lights, Abu Dhabi (2016)
- City of Arabia, Dubai (2010)
- Hameni Tower, Dubai (2018)
- Saraya Aqaba Resort, Jordan (2018)
- Bourdillon No. 4, Lagos in Nigeria (2018)
- 27 Glover Road - The Pantheon, Lagos in Nigeria (2024)
- Bourdillon No. 39, Lagos in Nigeria (2024)

== Significant works ==
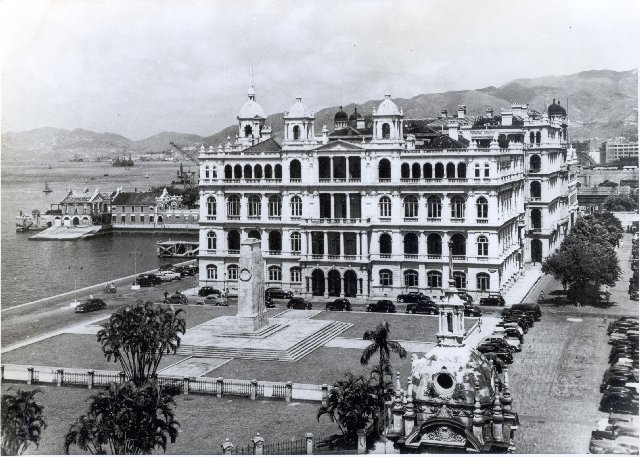
Hong Kong Club Building (second generation, 1897)

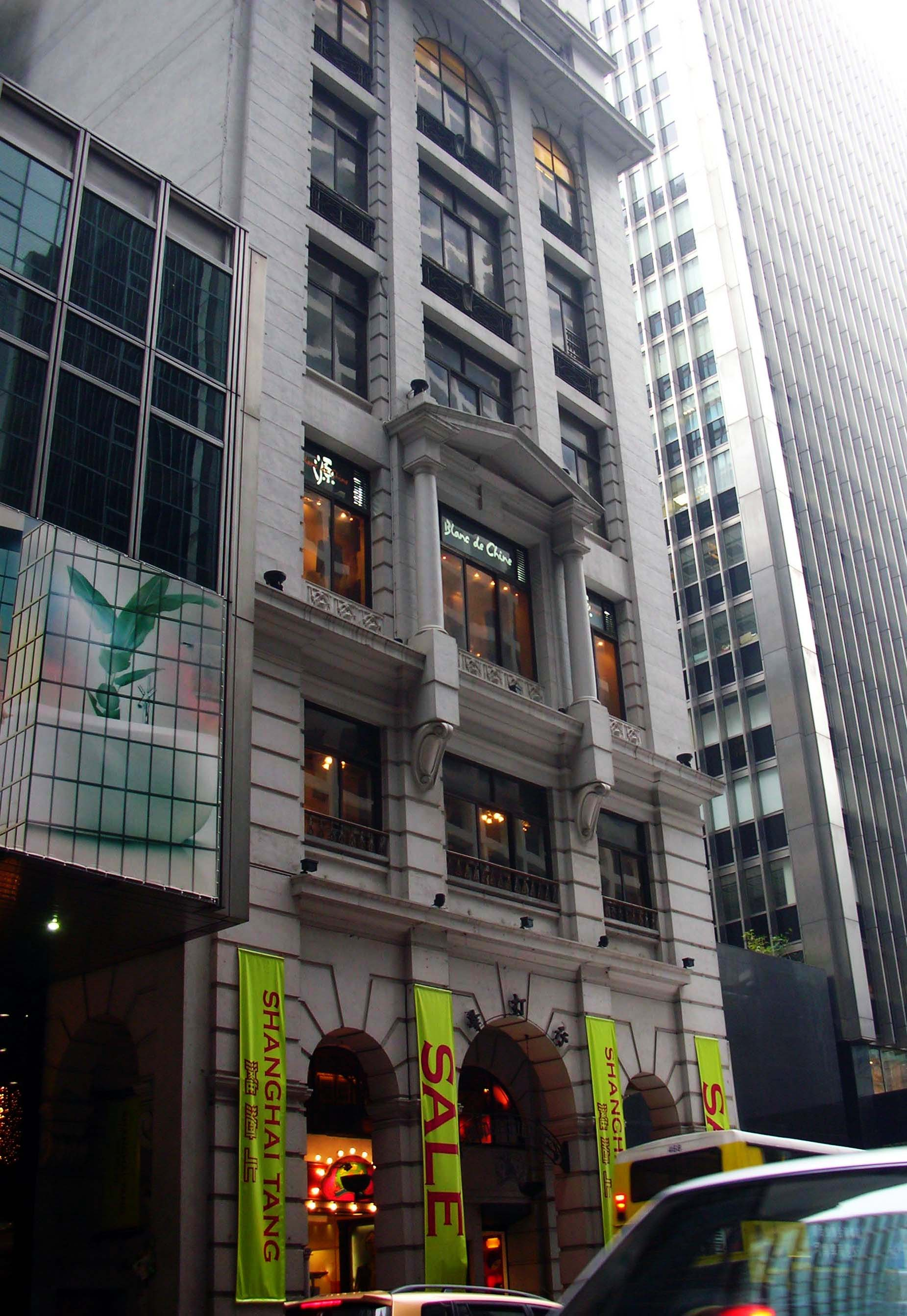
Pedder Building, Hong Kong (1923)

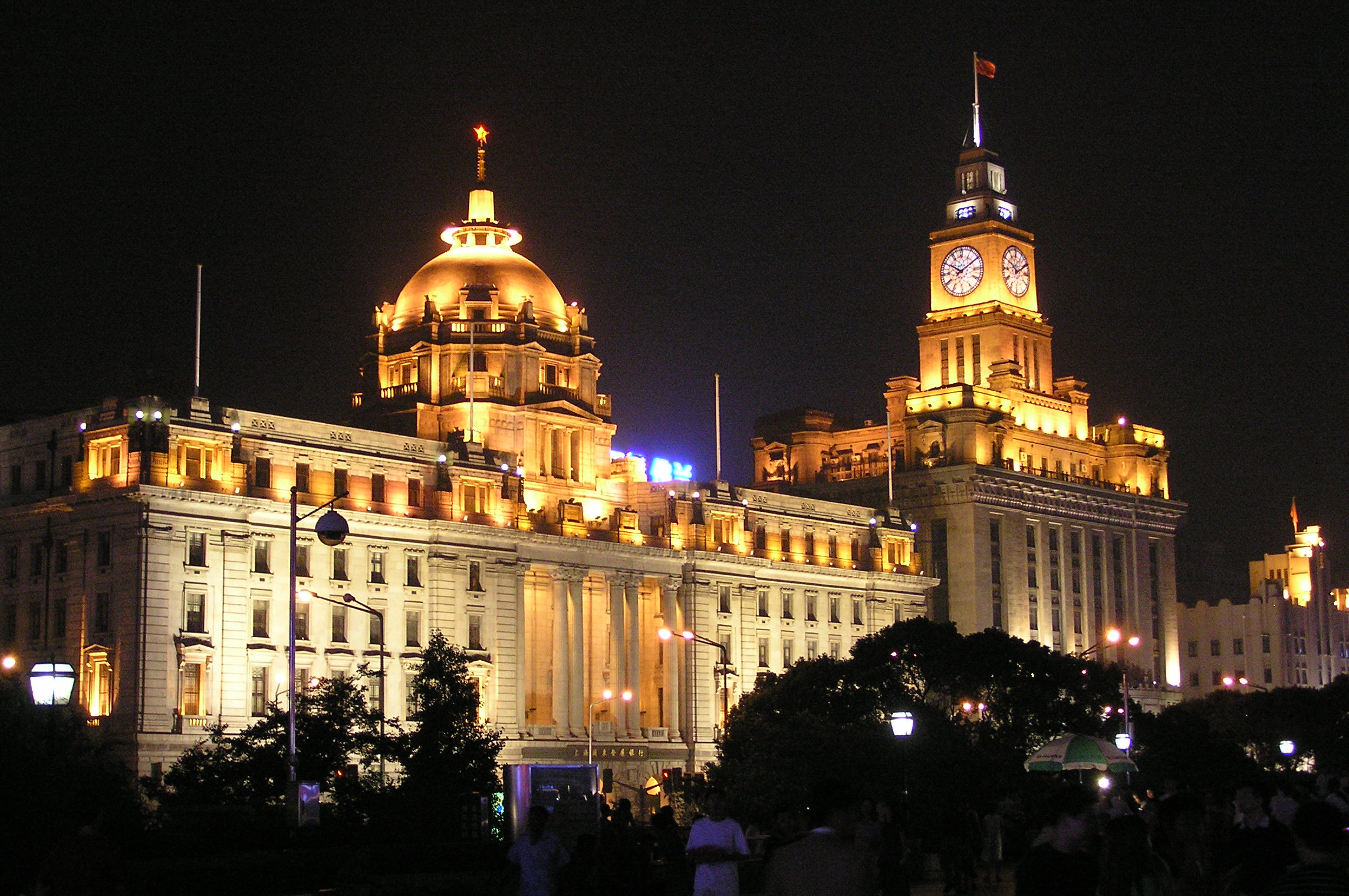
HSBC Building, Shanghai, Shanghai (1923)

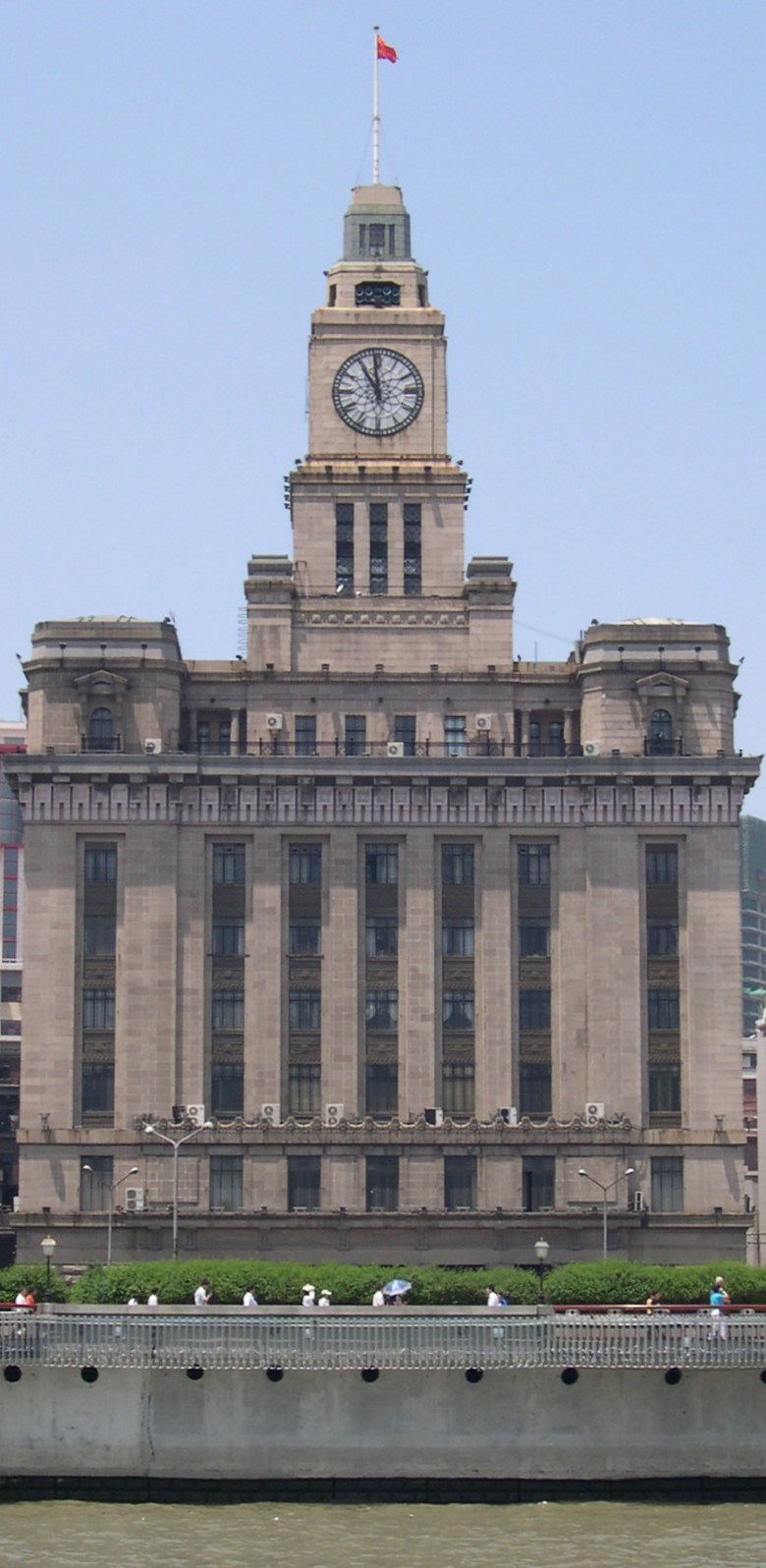
Customs House, Shanghai (1927)

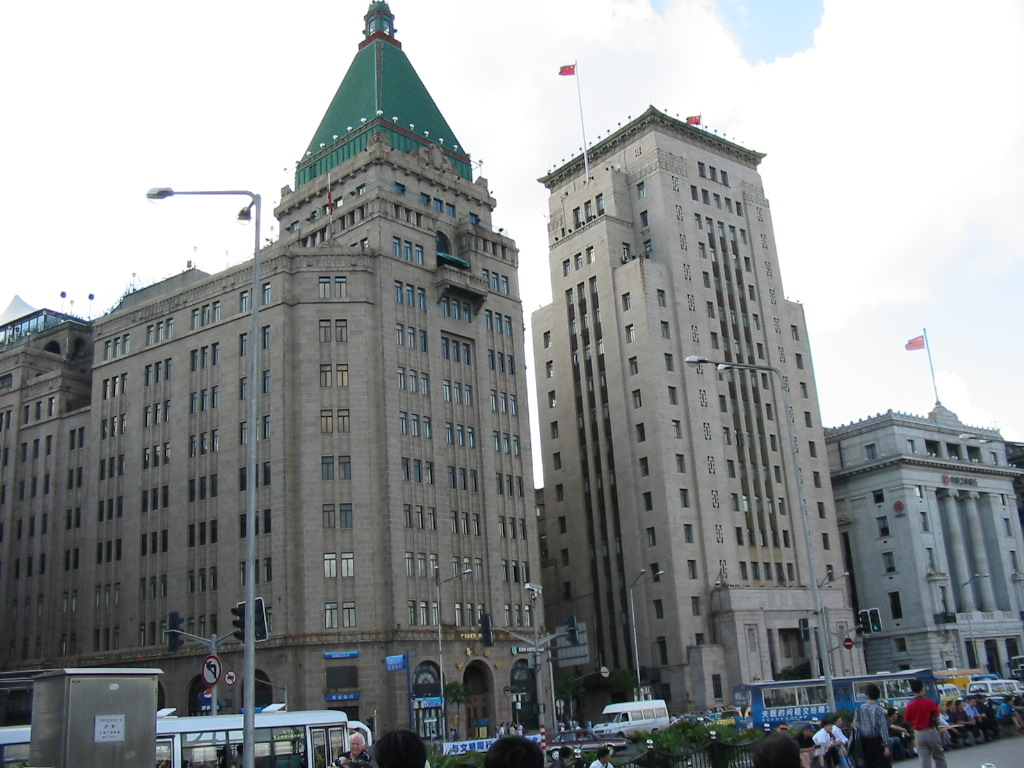
Sassoon House, Shanghai (1929)

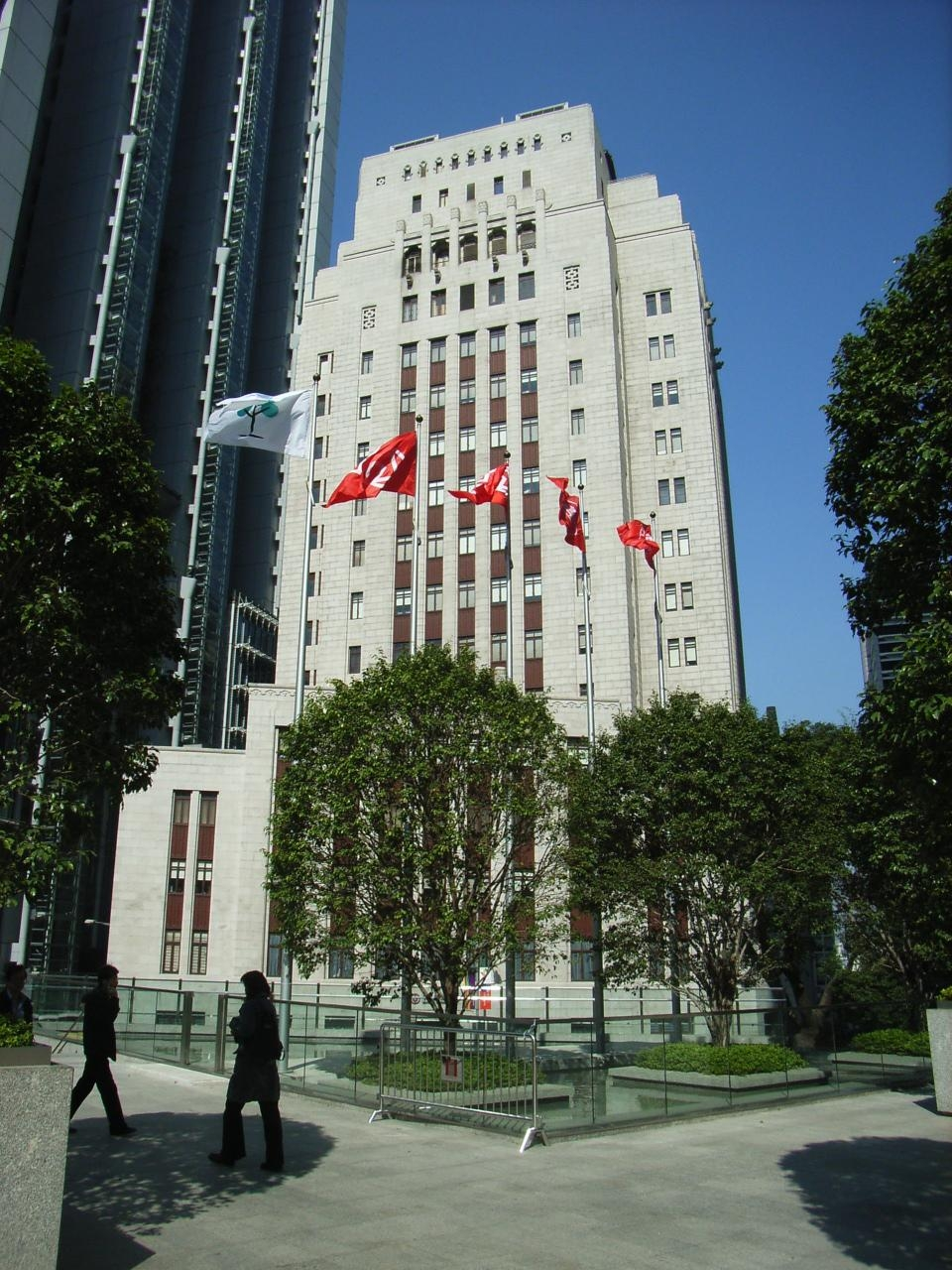
Bank of China Building, Hong Kong (1952)

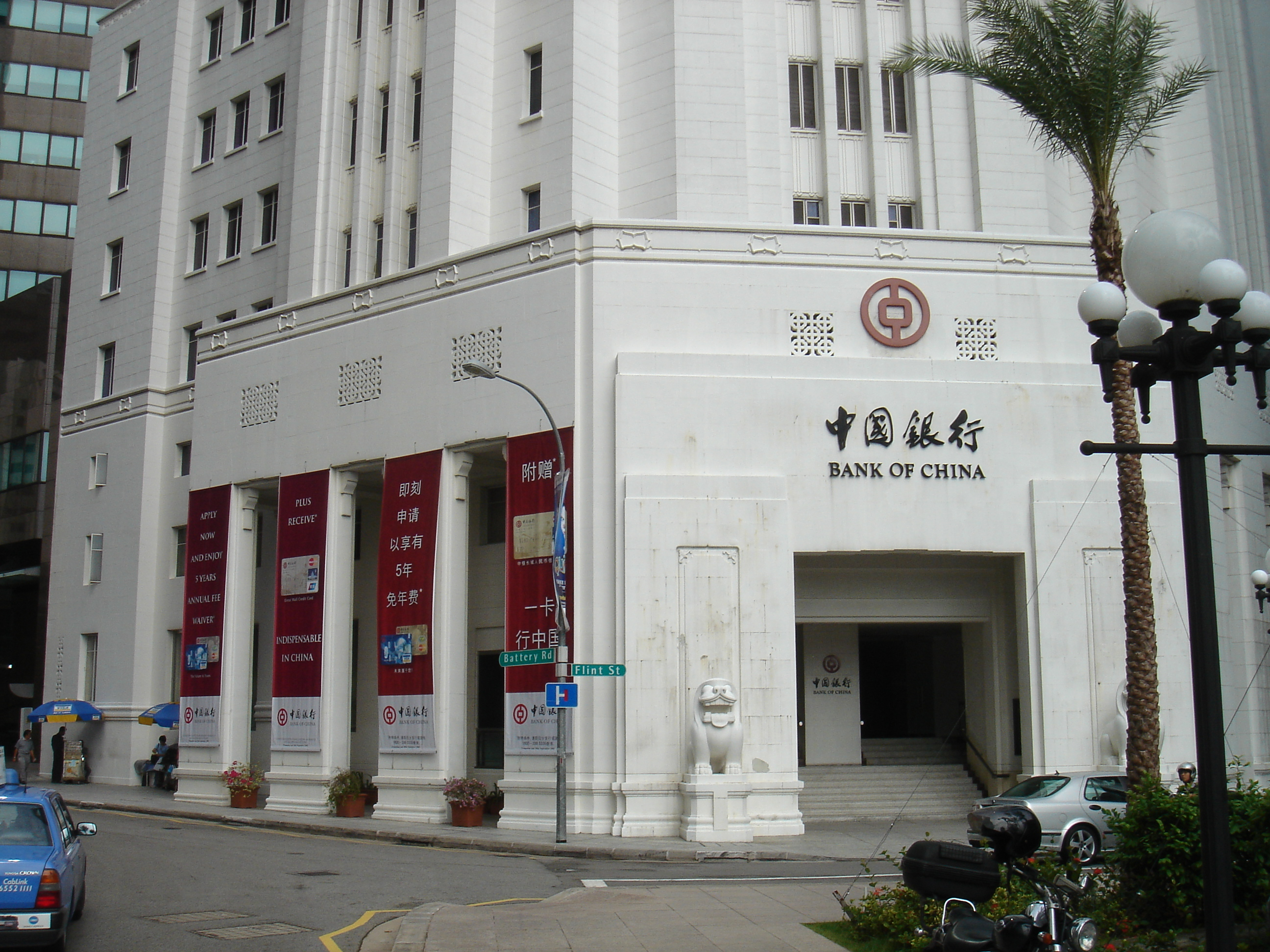
Bank of China Building, Singapore (1954)

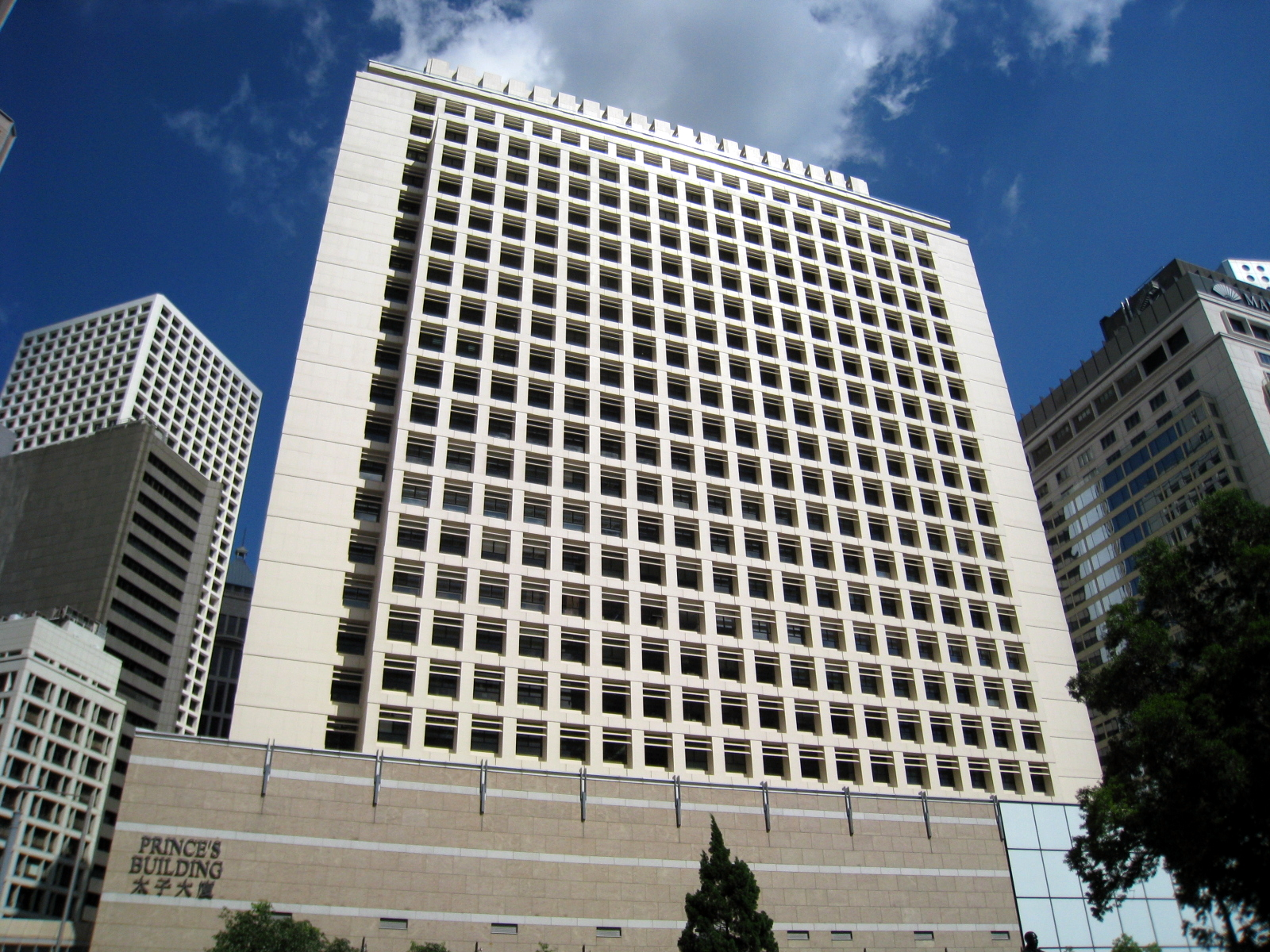
Prince's Building, Hong Kong (second generation, 1965)

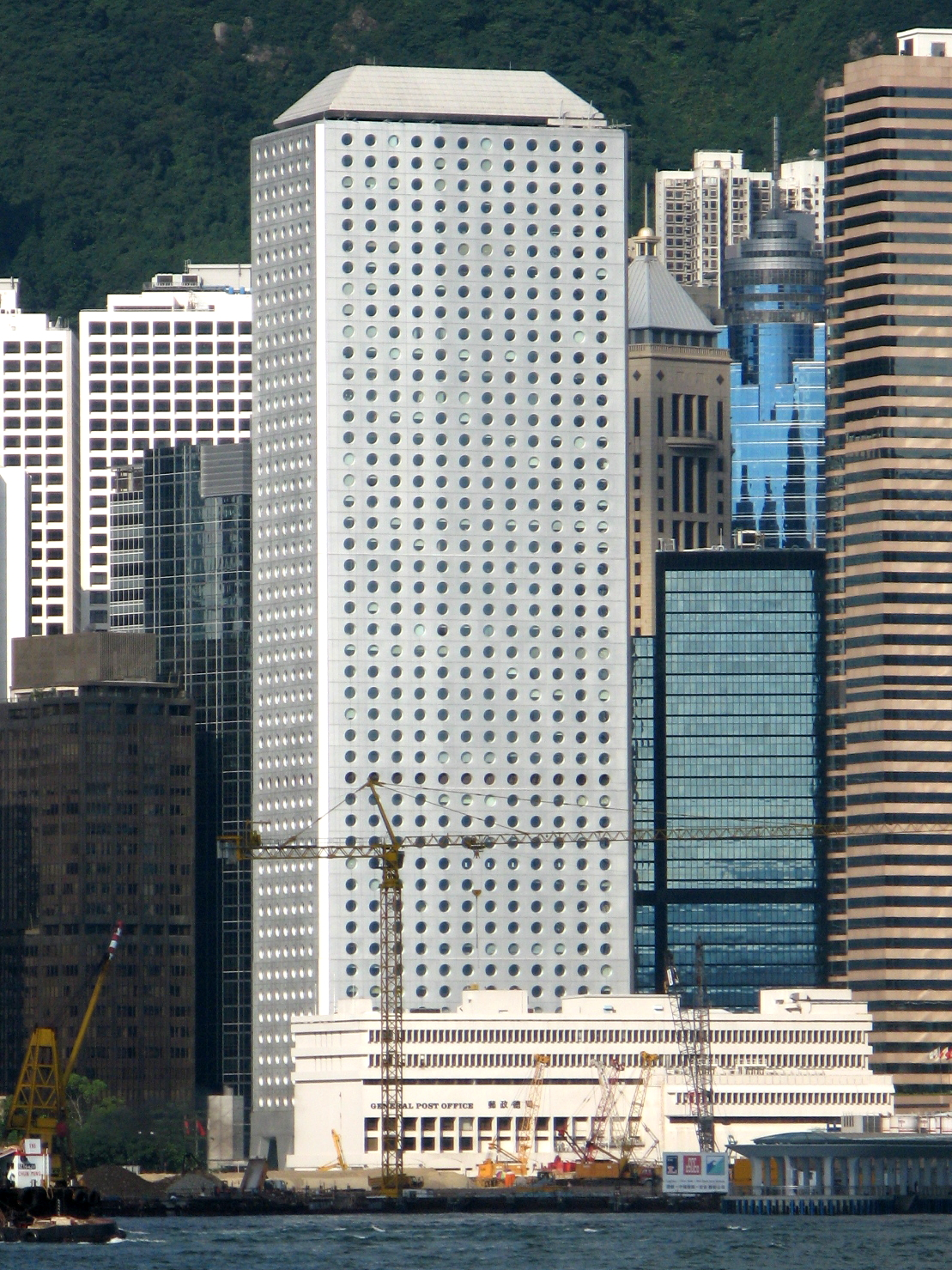
Jardine House, Hong Kong (1972)

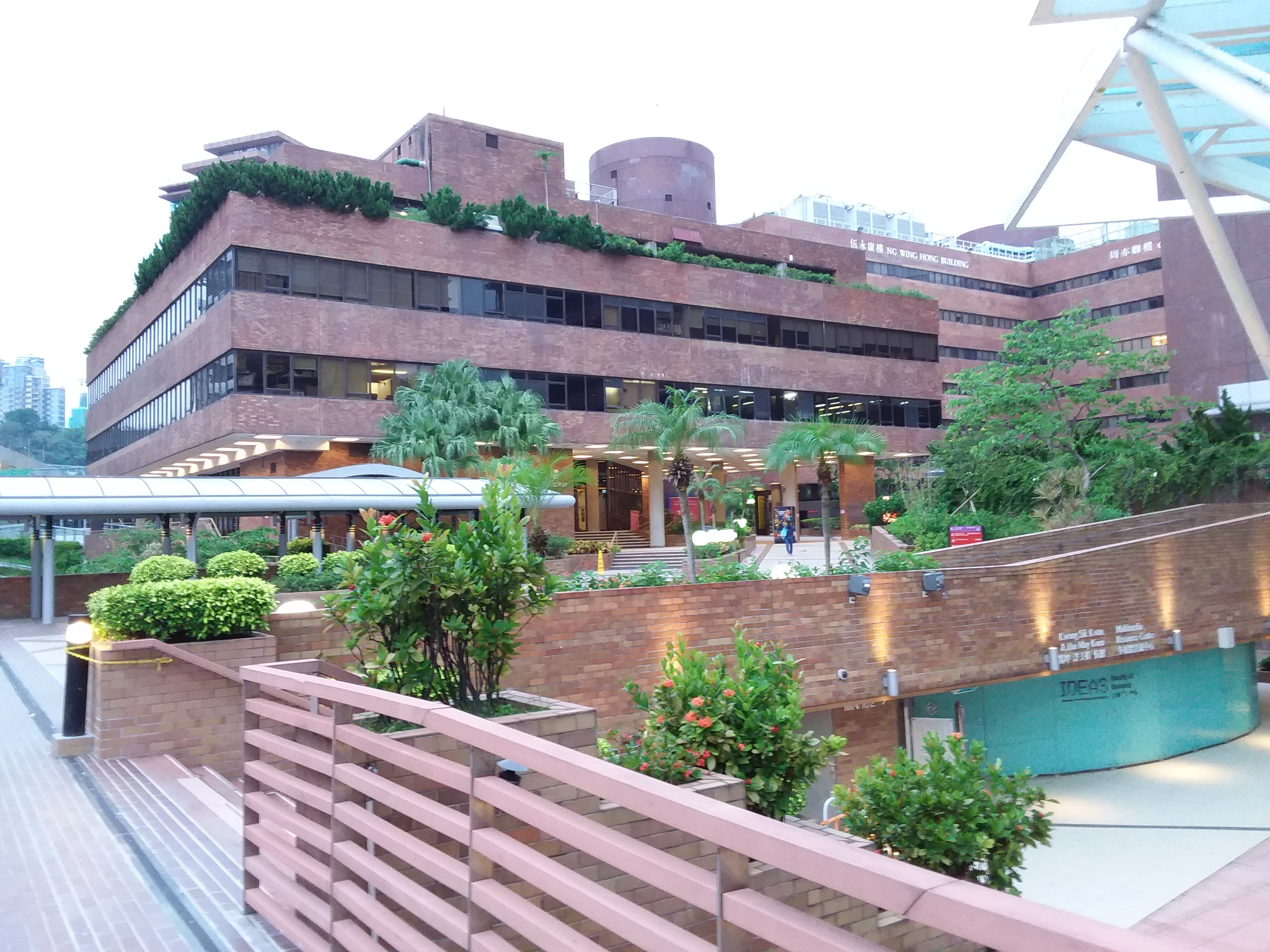
Hong Kong Polytechnic University, Hong Kong (1972)

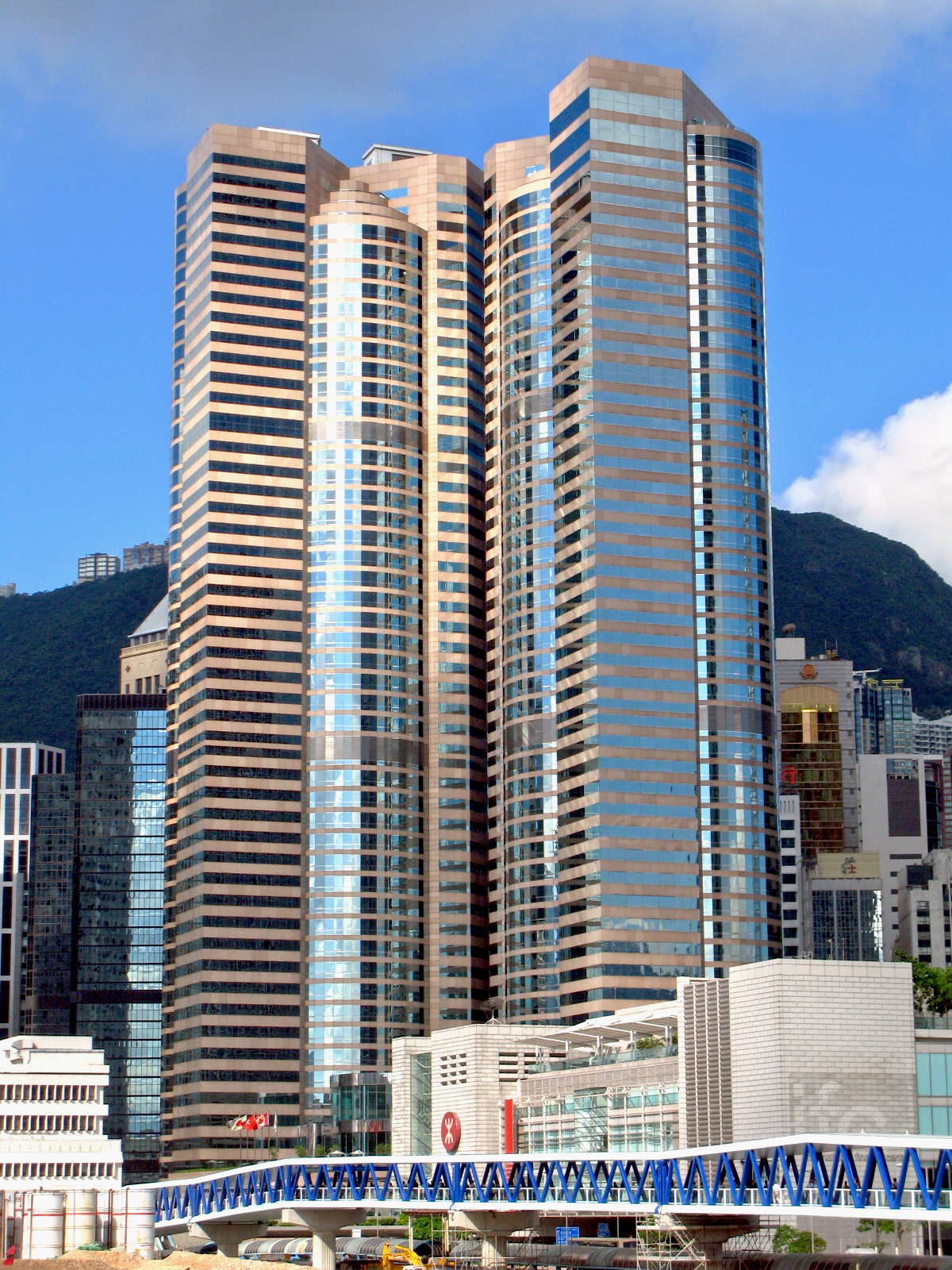
Exchange Square, Hong Kong (1988)

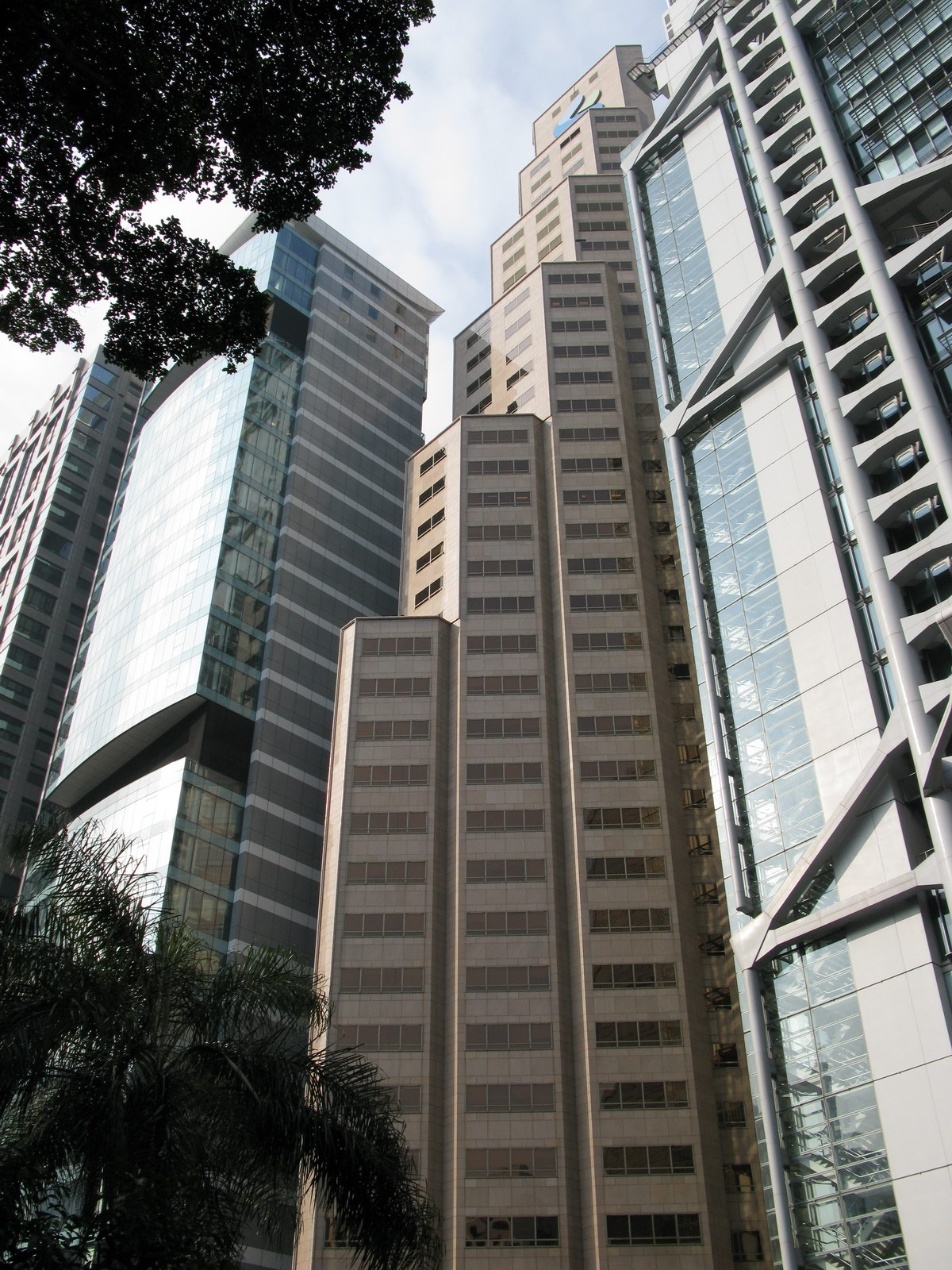
Standard Chartered Bank Building (Hong Kong) (1990)
