= List of buildings and structures in Hong Kong =

This is a list of buildings and structures in Hong Kong, in alphabetical order.

== Sports venues ==
- Hong Kong Coliseum
- Hong Kong Stadium
- Kai Tak Sports Park
- Mong Kok Stadium
- Queen Elizabeth Stadium

== Shopping malls ==
- Apm (Hong Kong)
- Discovery Park (Hong Kong)
- Elements (Hong Kong)
- Harbour City (Hong Kong)
- K11 Musea
- Langham Place
- New Town Plaza
- Pacific Place (Hong Kong)
- The Landmark (Hong Kong)
- Times Square (Hong Kong)

== Hotels ==
- Conrad Hong Kong
- Cordis Hong Kong
- Four Seasons Hotel Hong Kong
- Grand Hyatt Hong Kong
- Hotel Icon (Hong Kong)
- Hyatt Regency Hong Kong, Tsim Sha Tsui
- Hyatt Regency Hong Kong, Sha Tin
- Island Shangri-La
- JW Marriott Hotel Hong Kong
- Kerry Hotel Hong Kong
- Kowloon Shangri-La
- Landmark Mandarin Oriental
- Le Meridien Cyberport Hotel
- Mandarin Oriental (formerly Queens Building)
- Panda Hotel
- Rosewood Hong Kong
- The Peninsula Hong Kong
- The Ritz-Carlton, Hong Kong
- The St. Regis Hong Kong
- The Upper House Hotel Hong Kong
- W Hong Kong

== Office buildings ==
- AIA Tower
- Bank of America Tower
- Bank of China Tower
- Central Plaza
- Cheung Kong Centre
- Cityplaza
- Cyberport
- Exchange Square (Hong Kong) (Exchange Square One, Two and Three)
- Hong Kong Convention and Exhibition Centre
- Hopewell Centre
- HSBC Hong Kong headquarters building
- Hysan Place
- Lippo Centre
- Murray House
- Pacific Place
- Standard Chartered Bank Building
- International Commerce Centre
- International Finance Centre (1 and 2)
- Manulife Plaza
- Prince's Building
- Shui On Centre
- Taikoo Place
- The Center
- Wing On House
- World-Wide House

== Places of worship ==
- Chi Lin Nunnery
- Man Mo Temple, Sheung Wan
- Po Lin Monastery
- St. John's Cathedral
- Pak Tai Temple, Wan Chai
- Wong Tai Sin Temple

== Others ==
- AsiaWorld-Expo
- Central Police Station
- Chinese People's Liberation Army Forces Hong Kong Building (formerly the Prince of Wales Building)
- Chungking Mansions
- The Cullinan
- Flagstaff House, housing the Flagstaff House Museum of Tea Ware
- Government House
- The Harbourside
- Hong Kong Academy for Performing Arts
- Hong Kong China Temple
- Hong Kong Convention and Exhibition Centre
- Hong Kong International Trade and Exhibition Center
- Hong Kong Visual Arts Centre
- Jardine House
- Legislative Council of Hong Kong (former Supreme Court Building)
- Liaison Office of the Central People's Government
- Nan Lian Garden
- Prince of Wales Hospital
- Tian Tan Buddha
- Tung Chung Fort
- Tung Wah Group of Hospitals Museum
- Union Square
- Victoria Dockside
- Yiu Tung Public Library

== See also ==
- Category:Apartment buildings in Hong Kong
- Category:bridges in Hong Kong
- Category:piers in Hong Kong
- Category:public housing estates in Hong Kong
- Category:shopping centres in Hong Kong
- Declared monuments of Hong Kong
- Hong Kong International Airport
- Hong Kong-Zhuhai-Macau Bridge
- Kai Tak Airport, former Hong Kong International Airport
- Kowloon Walled City
- List of hospitals in Hong Kong
- List of district police stations in Hong Kong
- List of MTR stations
- List of the oldest buildings and structures in Hong Kong
- List of schools in Hong Kong
- List of universities in Hong Kong
- List of tallest buildings in Hong Kong
- Museums in Hong Kong
- Tunnels and bridges in Hong Kong
- List of cities with most skyscrapers
