= Island Shangri-La =

Island Shangri-La, Hong Kong
- 港島香格里拉
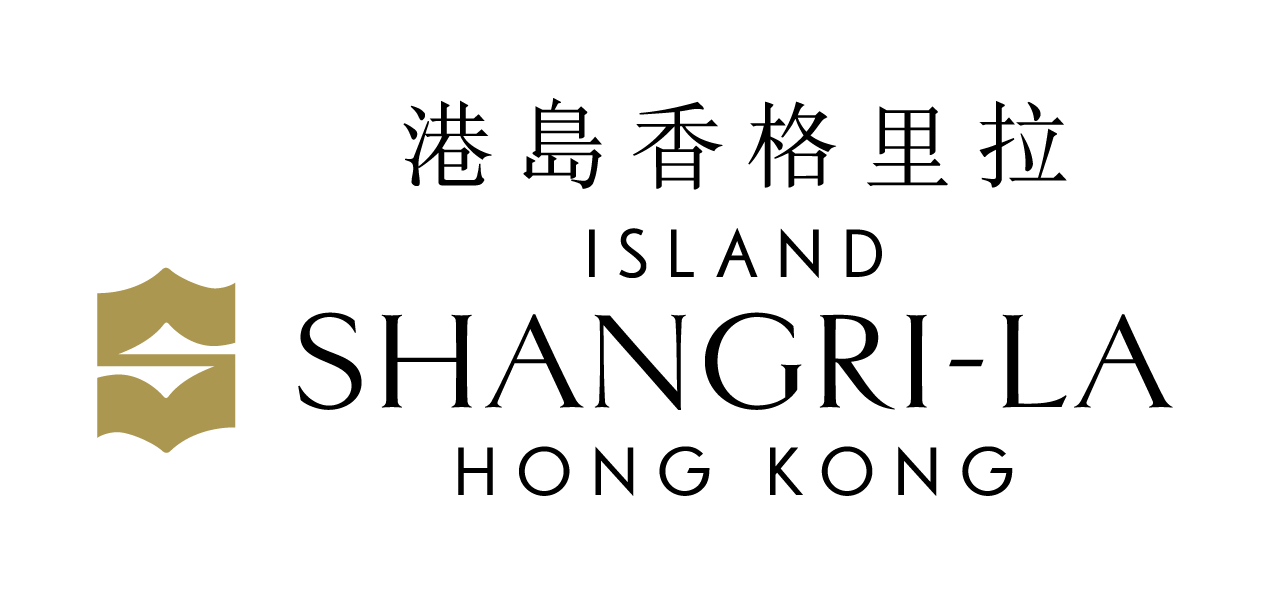

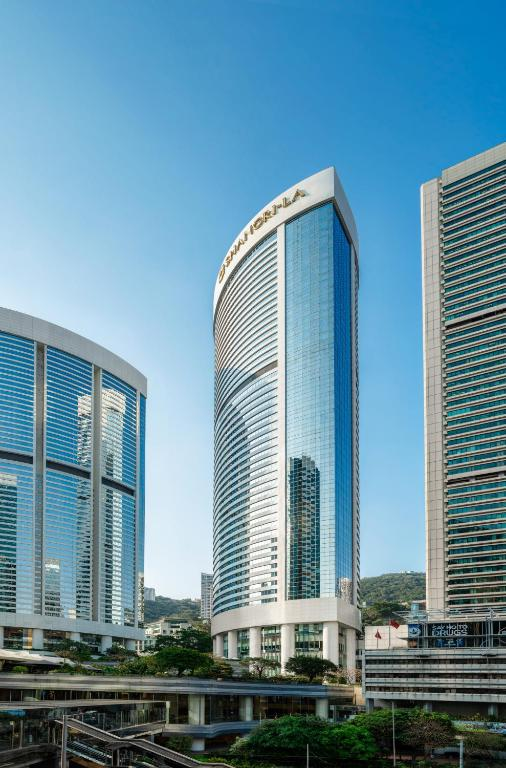
- Island Shangri-La, Hong Kong
- Interactive map of the Island Shangri-La, Hong Kong area

General information
- Status: Completed
- Type: Hotel
- Architectural style: High-rise
- Location: 88 Queensway, Pacific Place, Supreme Court Road, Central, Hong Kong
- Coordinates: 22°16′38″N 114°9′51″E
- Construction started: 1986; 40 years ago
- Completed: 1991; 35 years ago
- Opening: 1 March 1991; 35 years ago
- Owner: Shangri-La Hotels and Resorts; Swire Properties (20%)
- Operator: Shangri-La International Hotel Management Limited

Height
- Architectural: 213.1 m
- Tip: 213.1 m
- Top floor: 197.8 m

Technical details
- Floor count: 57

Design and construction
- Architect: Wong & Ouyang (HK) Ltd.
- Developer: Swire Properties
- Structural engineer: Leslie E. Robertson Associates
- Other designers: Leese Robertson Freeman Designers Ltd. (interior designer)

Other information
- Number of rooms: 557
- Number of suites: 34
- Number of restaurants: 7

Website
- Island Shangri-La, Hong Kong

Island Shangri-La
- Traditional Chinese: 港島香格里拉大酒店
- Simplified Chinese: 港岛香格里拉大酒店
Transcriptions
Standard Mandarin
- Hanyu Pinyin: Gǎngdǎo Xiānggélǐlā Dàjiǔdiàn
Yue: Cantonese
- Jyutping: gong2 dou2 hoeng1 gaak3 lei5 laai1 daai6 zau2 dim3

Island Shangri-La, Hong Kong (Chinese: 港島香格里拉大酒店) is a five-star luxury hotel of Shangri-La Hotels and Resorts. It is located in Admiralty, Hong Kong and is the sister hotel to the Kowloon Shangri-La in Tsim Sha Tsui East, Kowloon. It is housed within Two Pacific Place, a 213-metre, 57-storey skyscraper opened on 1 March 1991.

== History ==
The Island Shangri-La, Hong Kong was opened on 1 March 1991 as part of Pacific Place, a complex of office towers, hotels and a shopping centre at 88 Queensway in Admiralty. The hotel was part of phase two out of three, the initial phase having opened in 1988, and the final third phase in 2004. It contains 557 guestrooms which start at US$606 per night, of which 34 are suites which start at US$1,041 per night., spread through the top half of the tallest tower of the complex, which is 213 metres tall. The hotel also contains eight restaurants, a business centre, a 24-hour health club, a 645-square-metre ballroom, and seven function rooms. The bottom half of the tower contains office space, known as "Two Pacific Place".

Pacific Place contains three other luxury hotels: the Conrad Hong Kong, the JW Marriott Hotel Hong Kong, and Upper House Hong Kong. The complex is directly connected to Admiralty station, which began operation in 1980 as part of Hong Kong's Mass Transit Railway.

== Design and construction ==
The hotel's interior was designed by Leese Robertson Freeman Designers. 771 Viennese chandeliers are used throughout the interior, while carpets are provided by Tai Ping.

The proximity of Hong Kong Park, covering 80,000 m², has meant that the hotel has become popular with leisure travellers who are able to jog there in the mornings, according to former VP and GM Wolfgang Krueger.

== Features ==
=== Art collection ===
The Great Motherland of China, a silk painting composed of 250 panels, is the centrepiece of the hotel's art collection. It scales an internal wall of over 16 stories and can only be seen from within the hotel's inner atrium, stretching from the 41st to 56th floor and only accessible to guests. The painting was created by a team of 40 artists from Beijing and took six months to complete.

The hotel also holds a collection of over 700 artworks, and frequently hosts art fairs and auctions. As well as auctions in its ballroom by the likes of Bonhams that focus on contemporary Asian art, the hotel was also selected as the venue for art entrepreneur Dong Myeong Kim's Bank Art Fair, which showcased over 100 emerging Korean artists on floors 41 and 42 as part of Art Basel Hong Kong from 23–26 May 2013.

=== Rooms and suites ===
The hotel has 523 standard rooms, 17 executive suites, 14 Harbour View Suites, two speciality suites at and a Presidential Suite. Each has views of either the Victoria Harbour, or Victoria Peak. The rooms are all scented with the hotel's own brand fragrance, which it has made available for sale.

=== Restaurants ===
The hotel contains seven restaurants. Fine dining facilities includes the one-Michelin-starred Cantonese restaurant Summer Palace and the one-Michelin-starred French cuisine Restaurant Petrus, both of which received the recognition in the guide's inaugural 2021 Hong Kong and Macau edition.

=== Health Club ===
Located on Level 8, the Health Club offers yoga and pilates circuit classes. Treatments include the signature Caviar Crystal Soothing Treatment, using the European approach of entrusting selected products such as jojoba, almond, peppermint and rosemary oil for spa treatments in order to be unobtrusive. The club contains five treatment rooms, two for women, two for couples and one for men.

== Gallery ==
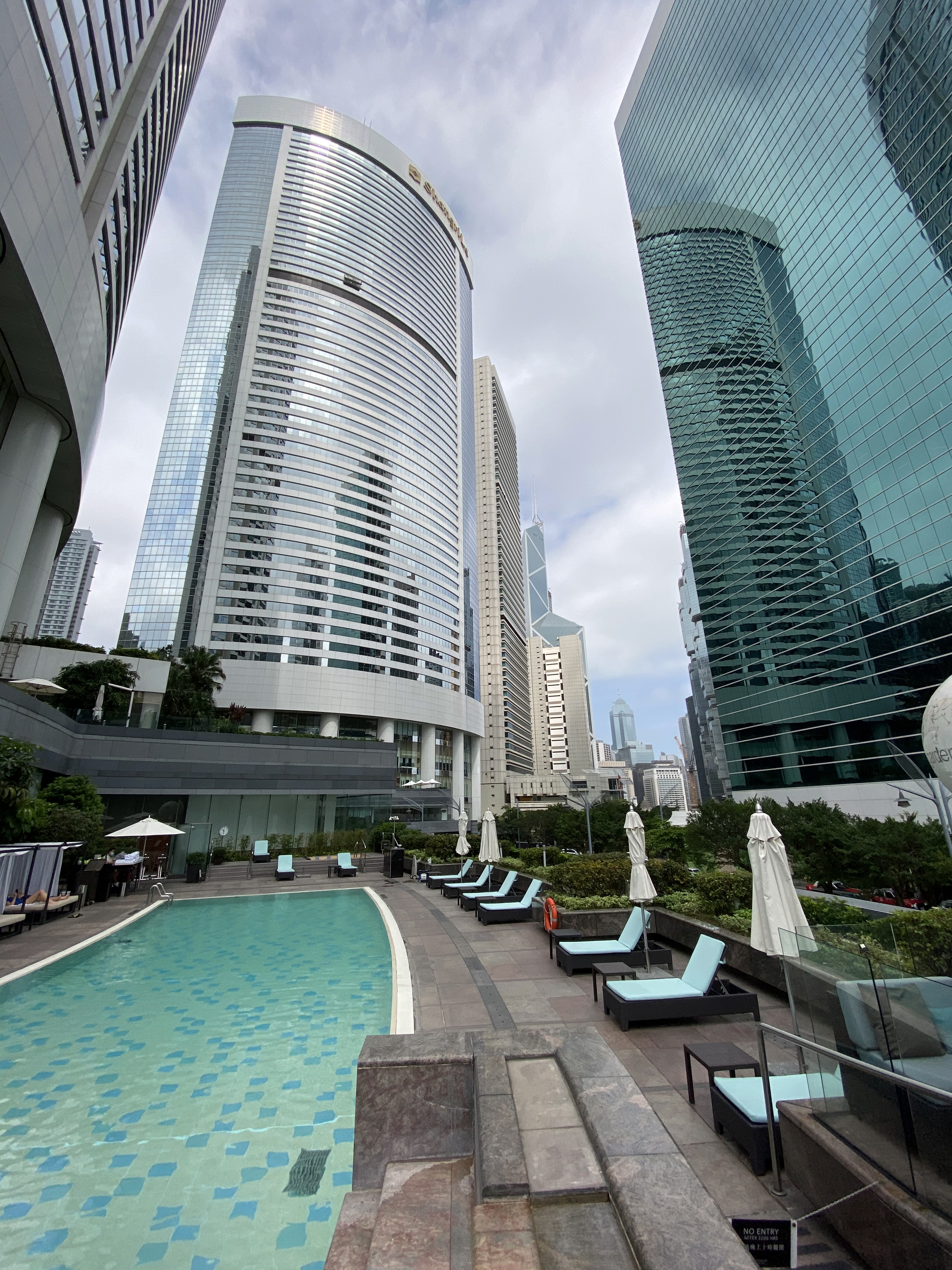
Exterior view of Two Pacific Place, taken from the adjacent Conrad Hotel

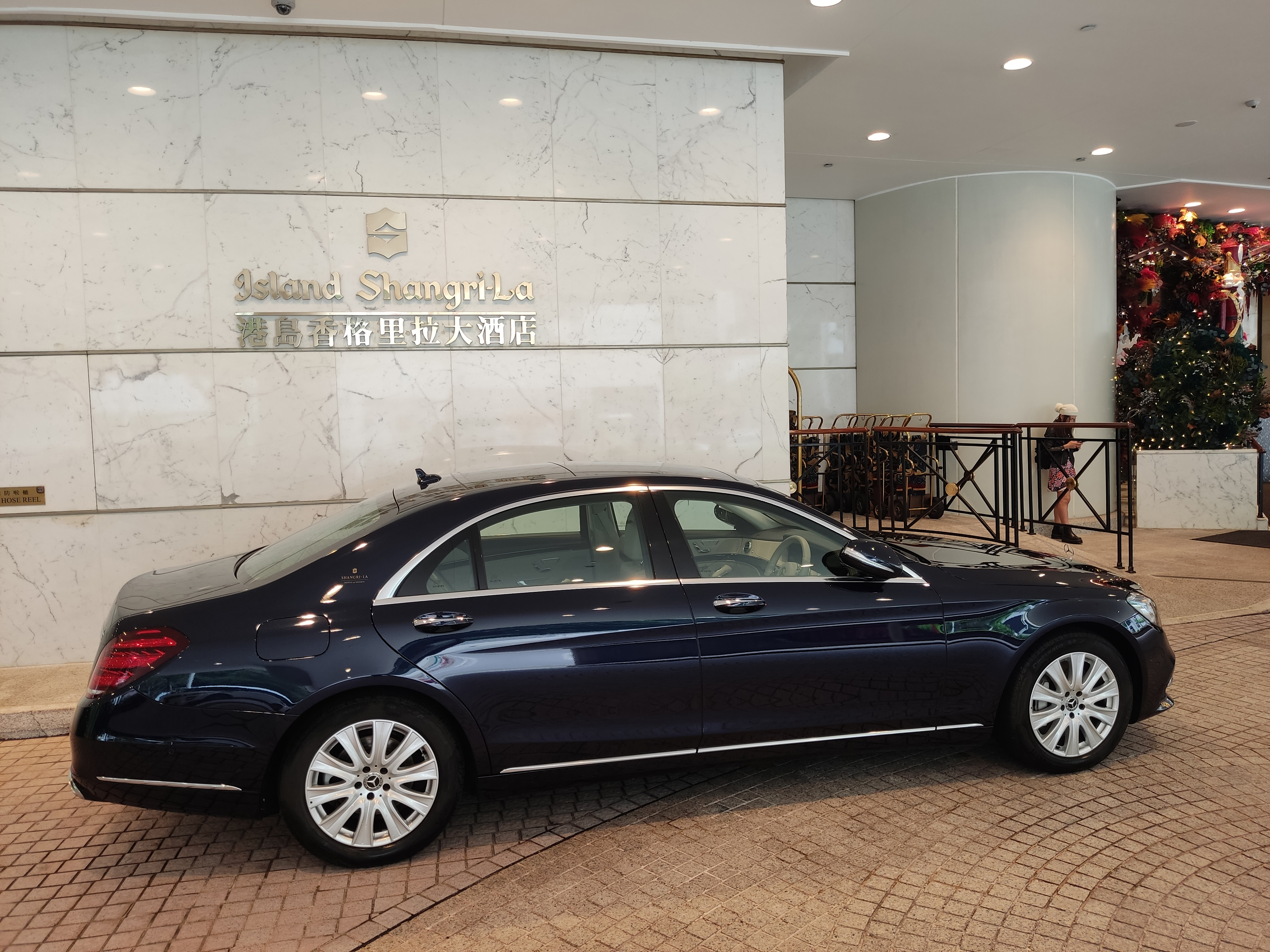
Hotel driveway, 6th floor

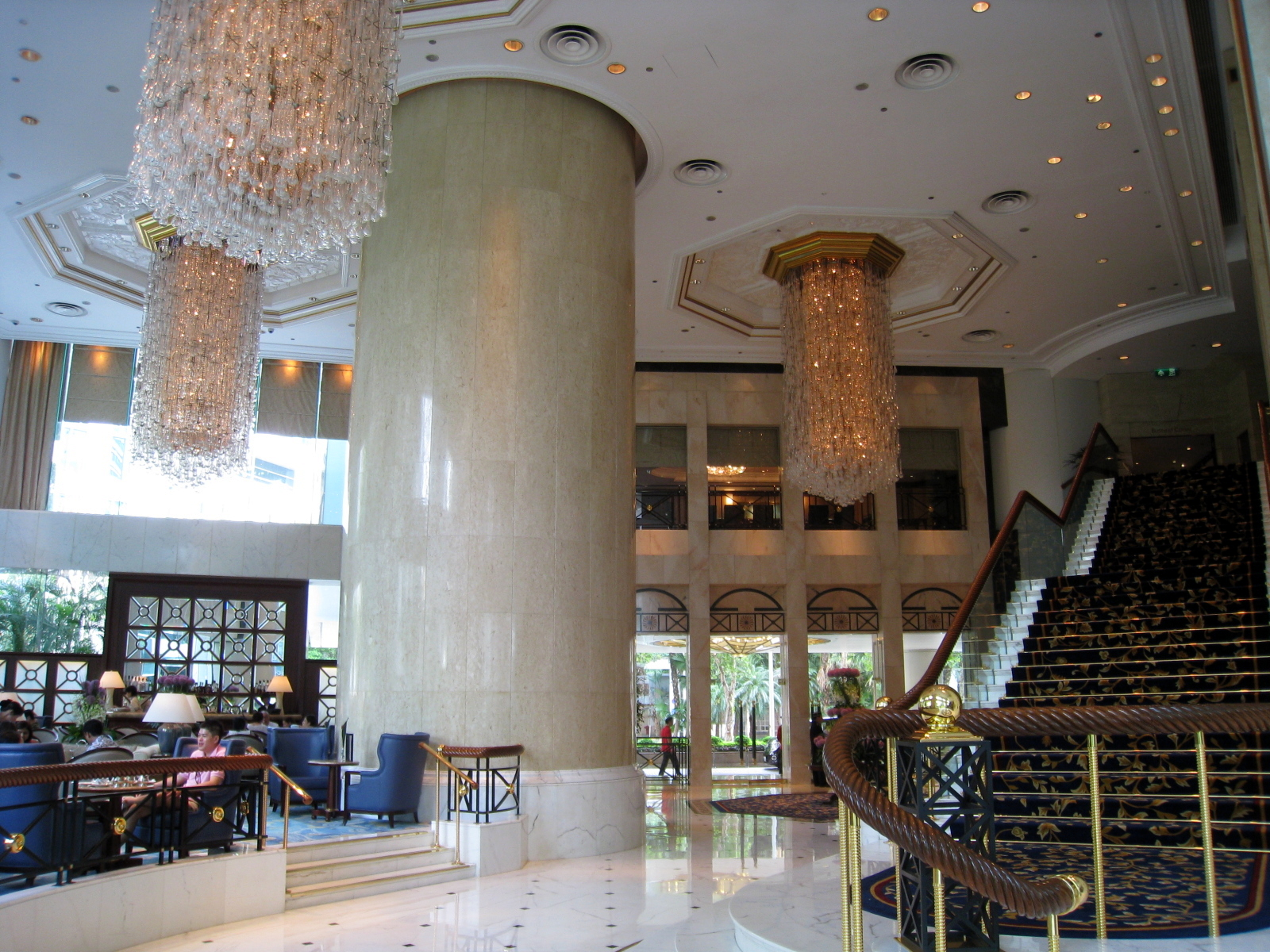
Main lobby, 6th floor

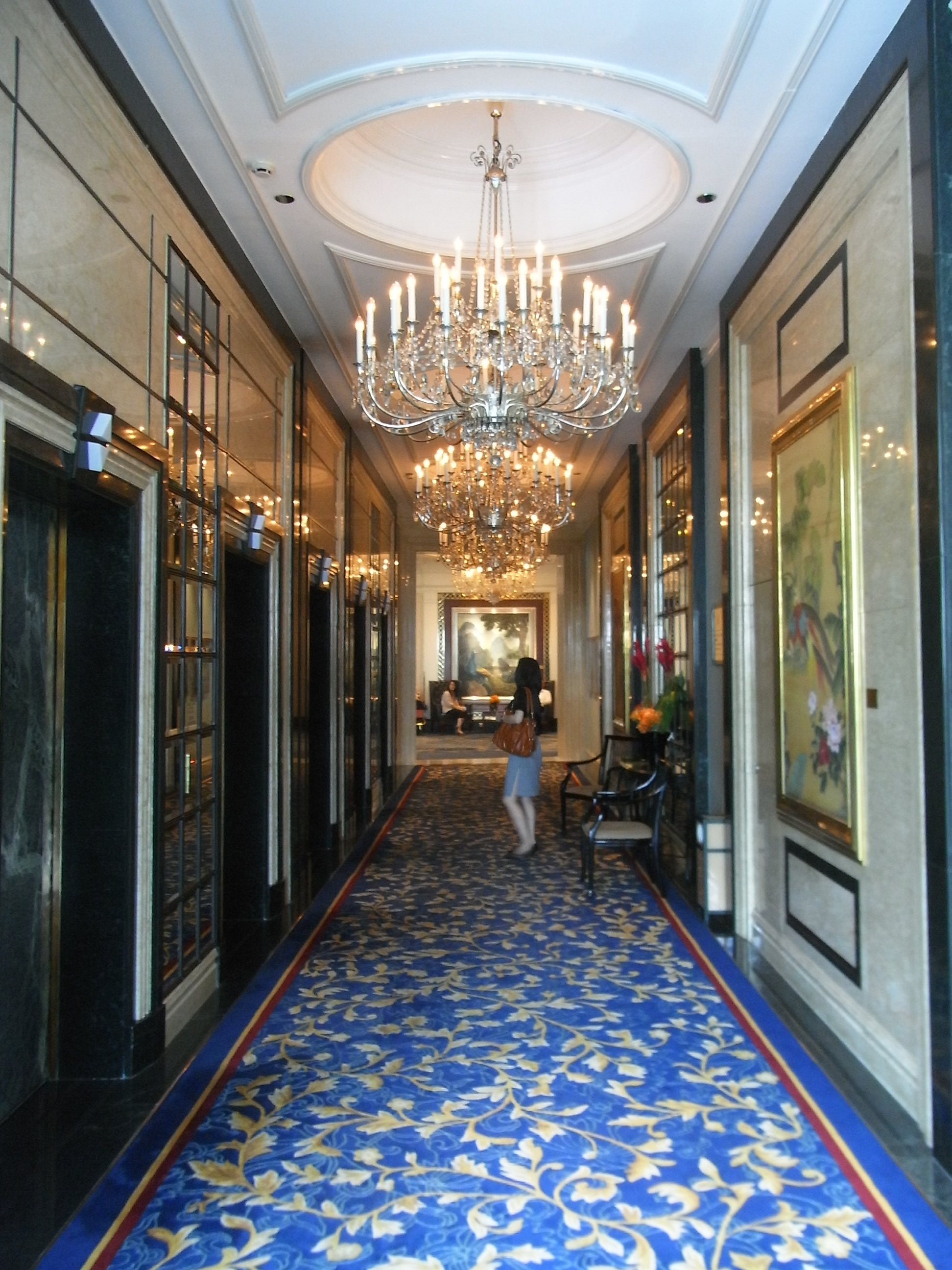
Elevator hall, 6th floor

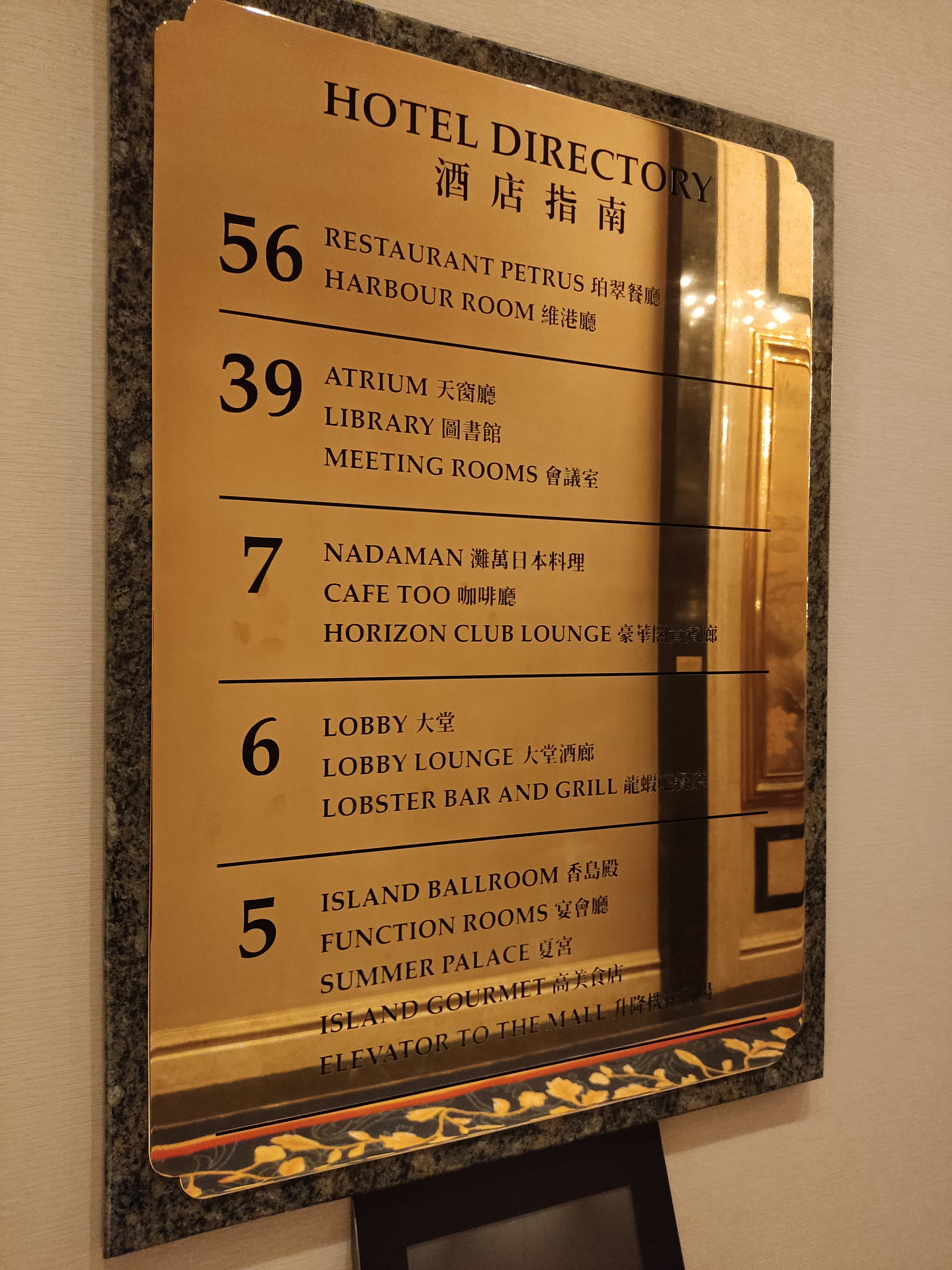
Directory board, 6th floor

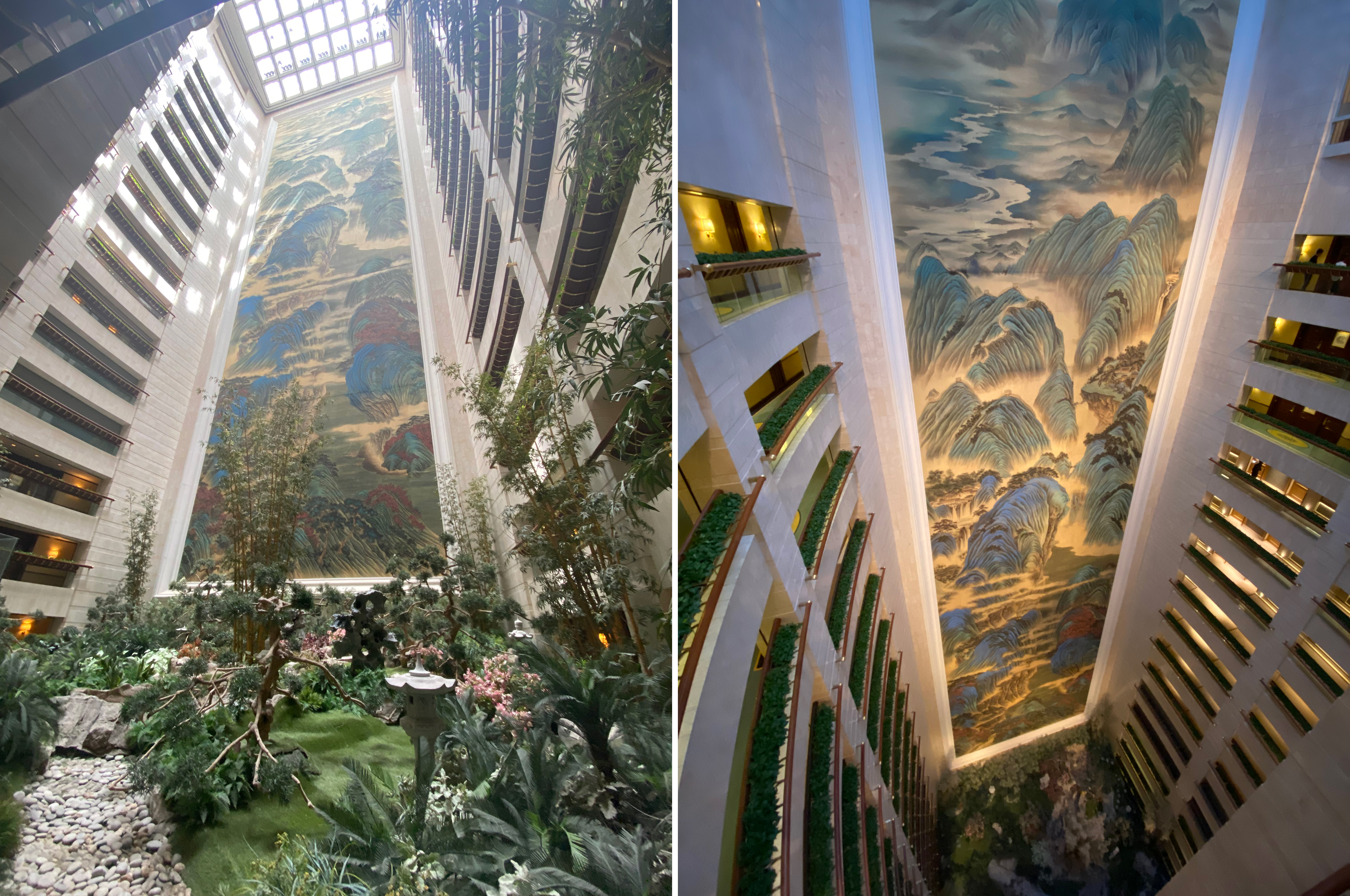
Inner atrium with The Great Motherland of China on display, 41st to 56th floor

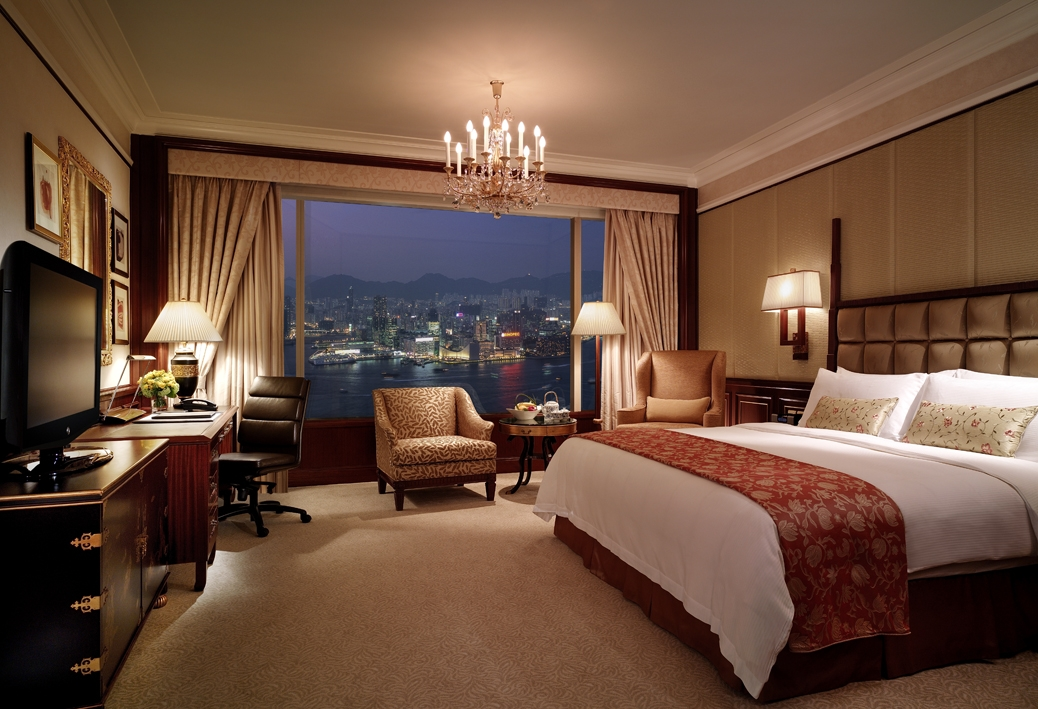
Interior of Harbour View room

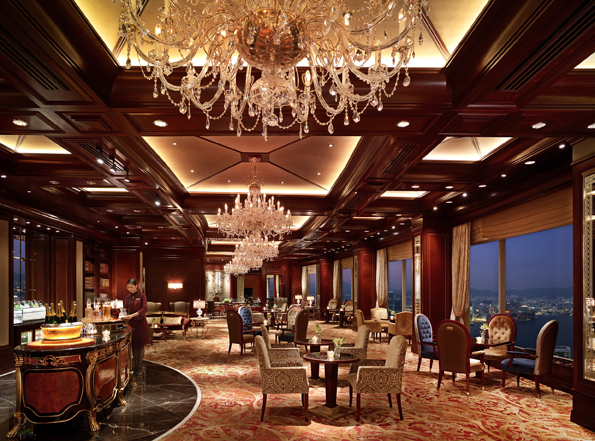
Interior of Horizon Club Lounge, 7th floor

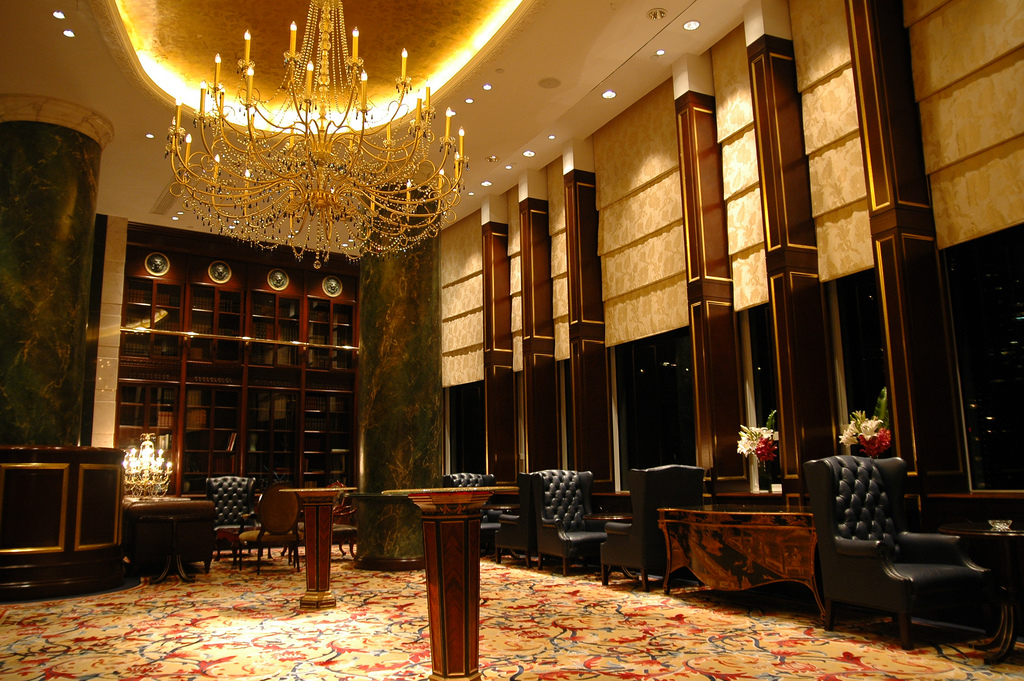
Interior of hotel library, 39th floor

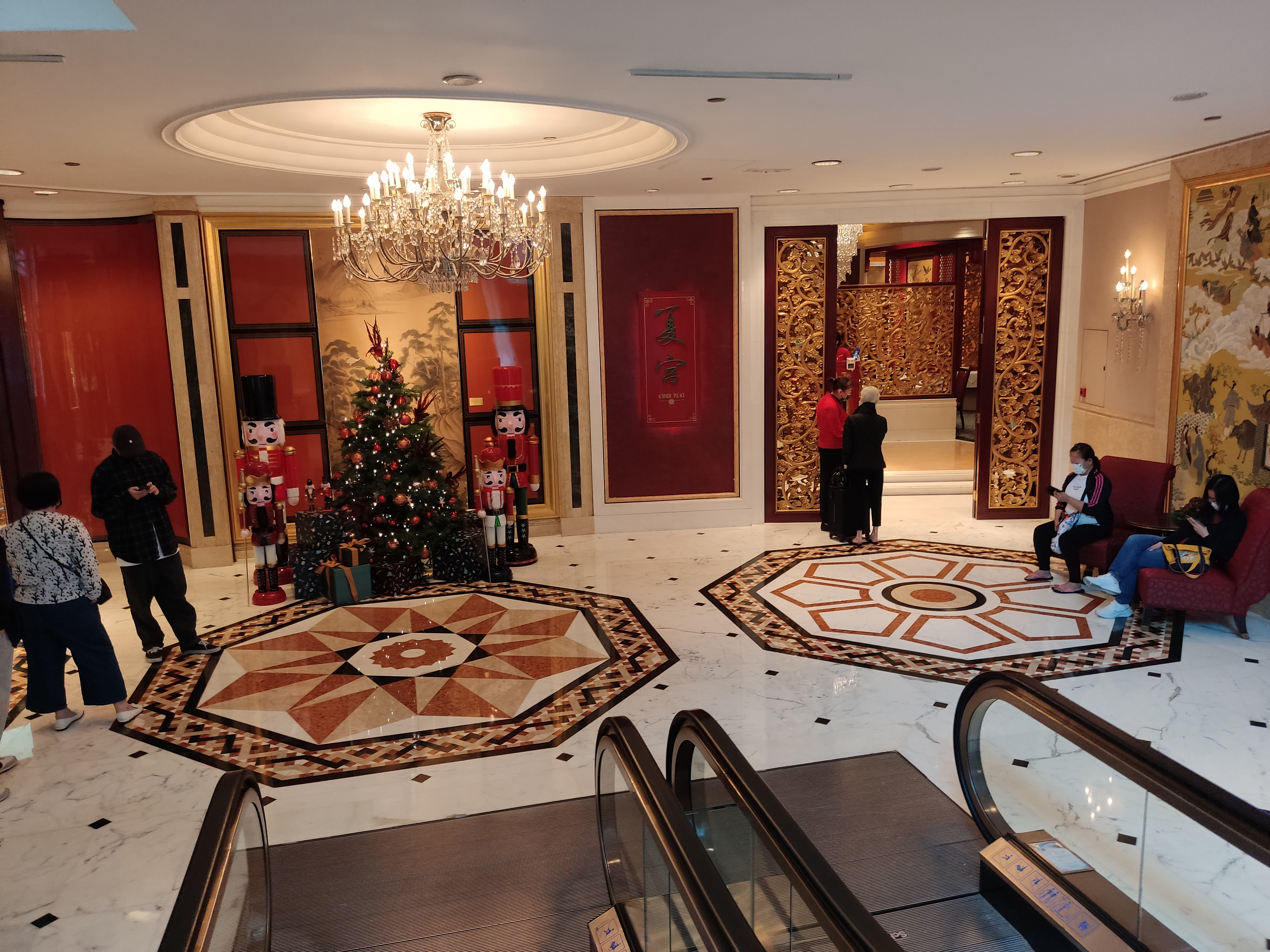
Entrance to Summer Palace restaurant, 5th floor

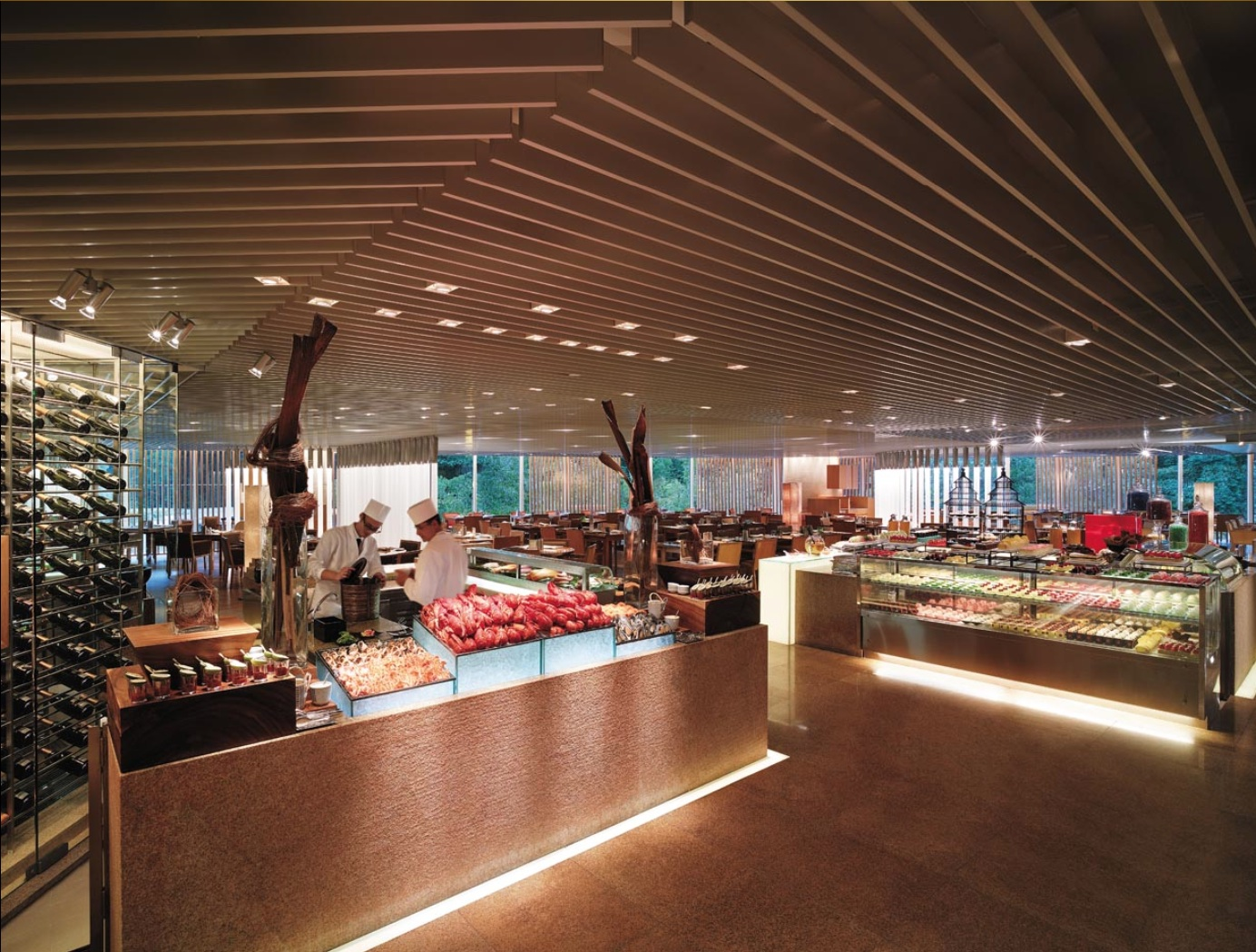
Interior of Café TOO buffet restaurant, 7th floor

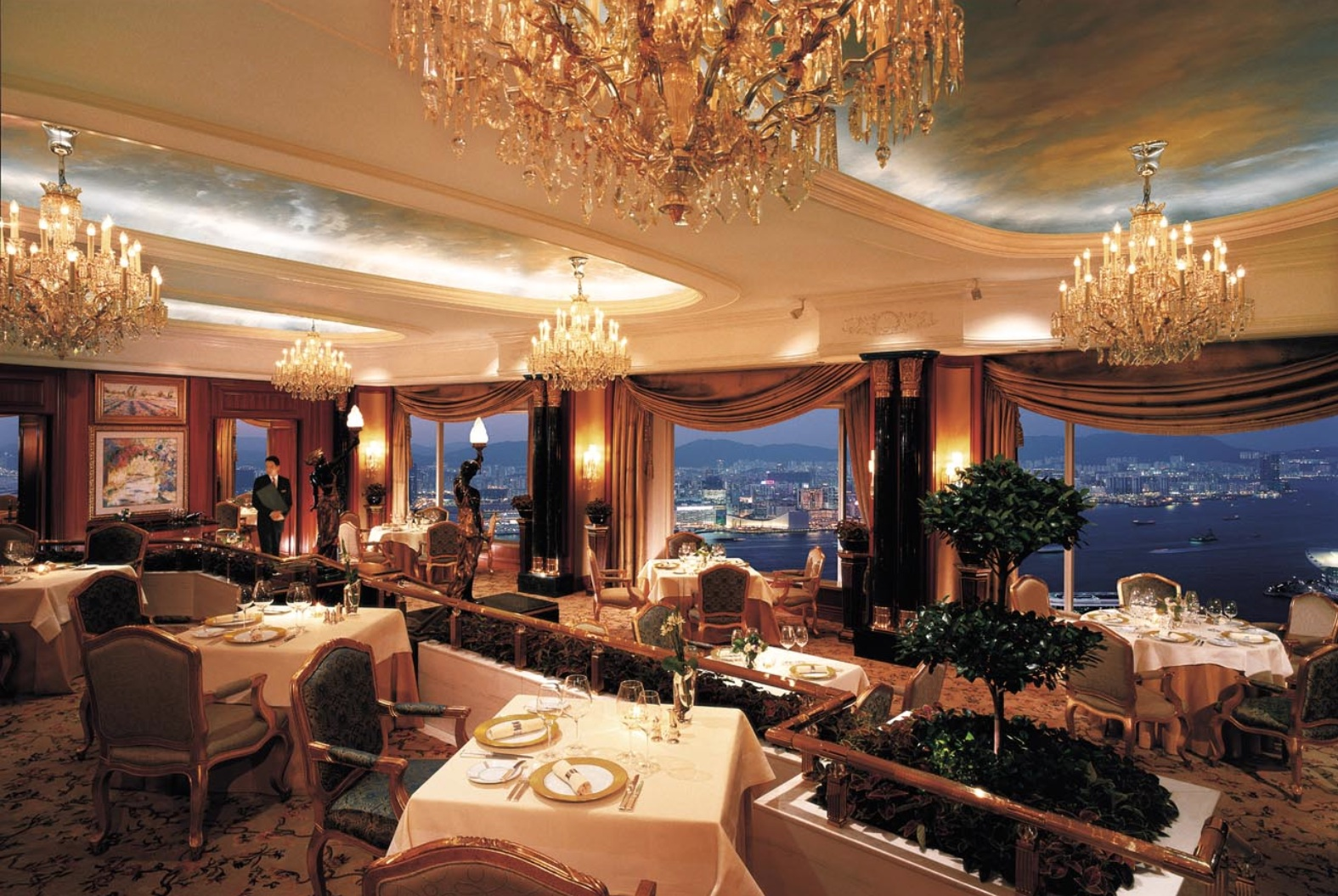
Interior of Petrus restaurant, 56th floor
