= Kowloon Shangri-La =

Hotel in Hong Kong

- 九龍香格里拉大酒店
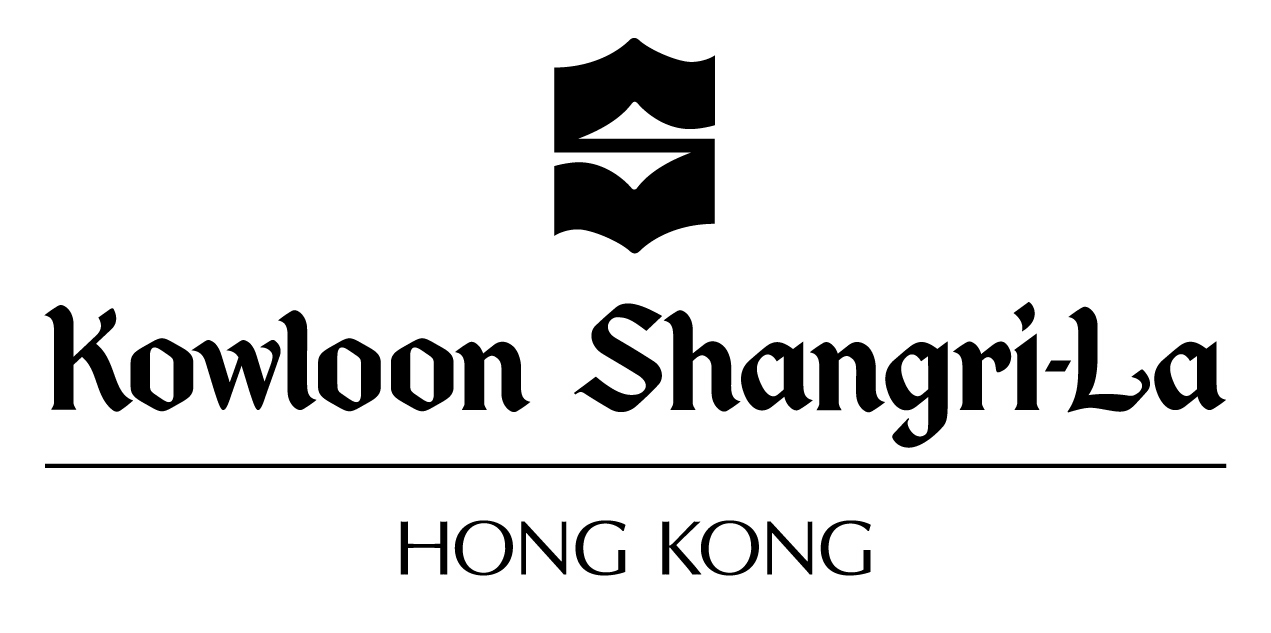

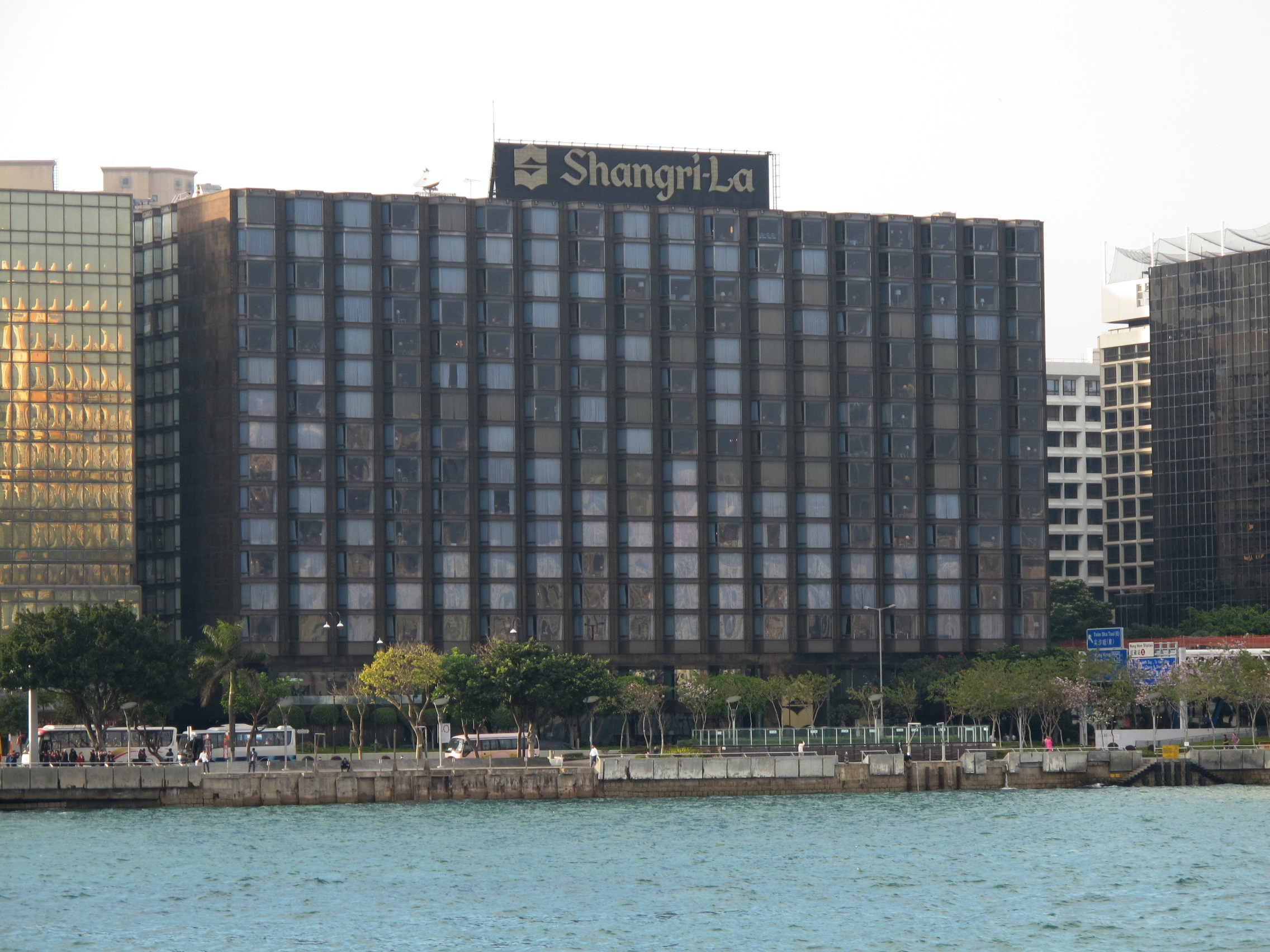
- Kowloon Shangri-La (2011)
- Interactive map of the Kowloon Shangri-La area

General information
- Status: Completed
- Type: Hotel
- Location: 64 Mody Road, Tsim Sha Tsui East, Kowloon, Hong Kong
- Coordinates: 22.297198°N 114.177361°E
- Opening: 17 June 1981; 44 years ago
- Owner: Shangri-La Hotels
- Operator: Ulf Bremer

Design and construction
- Architect: Wong & Ouyang Associates

Other information
- Number of rooms: 679

Website
- Kowloon Shangri-La official website

Kowloon Shangri-La
- Traditional Chinese: 九龍香格里拉大酒店
- Simplified Chinese: 九龙香格里拉大酒店
Transcriptions
Standard Mandarin
- Hanyu Pinyin: Jiǔlóng Xiānggélǐlā Dàjiǔdiàn
Yue: Cantonese
- Yale Romanization: Gáu lùhng hēung gaak léih lāai daaih jáu dim
- Jyutping: Gau2 lung4 hoeng1 gaak3 lei5 laai1 daai6 zau2 dim3

Kowloon Shangri-La is a hotel of the Hong Kong–based Shangri-La Hotels and Resorts group. It is located on Mody Road in Tsim Sha Tsui East overlooking Victoria Harbour and the Hong Kong Island skyline. It is the sister hotel to the Island Shangri-La in Admiralty district, Hong Kong.

It is recently rated as a four star hotel in the Forbes Travel Guide in 2026.

== History ==
The history of the hotel is tied to the history of the Shangri-La Hotels and Resorts chain, which began with the opening of the Shangri-La Hotel in Singapore, in 1971. The Kuok Group, which built the Singapore hotel, put it under the management of Western International Hotels. Kuok entered hotel management in 1979 when Kuok Hotels was formed to manage the Rasa Sayang Resort and Spa in Penang, the Golden Sands Resort in Penang, and The Fijian, Yanuca Island, on Fiji.

A management contract with Western International for the new Hong Kong property was signed on 1 August 1978 and the Shangri-La Hotel opened on 17 June 1981, managed by Westin Hotels, the new name of Western International as of 5 January 1981. In 1983, the Kuok Group created Shangri-La International Hotel Management Ltd. The hotel was soon after renamed the Kowloon Shangri-La.

In April 1991,Shangri-La Hotels and Resorts assumed management of the Kowloon Shangri-La from Westin.

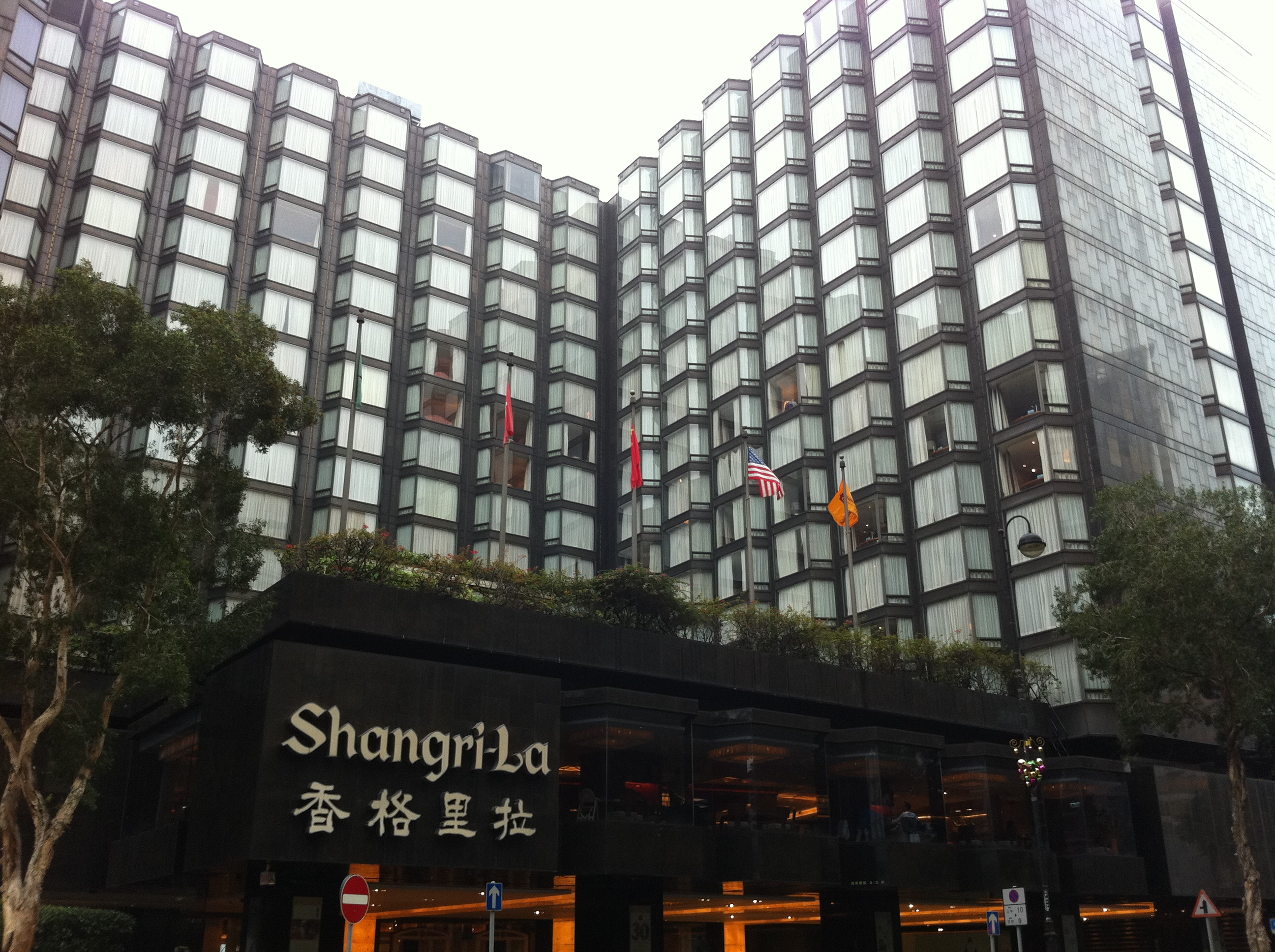
The facade of Kowloon Shangri-La Hotel

== Awards ==
Kowloon Shangri-La frequently receives recognition as one of the top luxury hotels in Asia, featuring in media such Condé Nast Traveler. It has won the following awards:

- Certificate of Excellence, Daodao.com (Trip Advisor China), 2013
- Best Hotels for Service (Asia) Category, Condé Nast Traveler Readers' Awards (UK), 2011
- China's Top 10 Most Popular Business Hotels, The Golden Pillow Award of China Hotels, 2009 and 2011
- Top 25 Luxury Hotels in China, Tripadvisor (UK)'s Travellers' Choice, 2012

== Design and construction ==
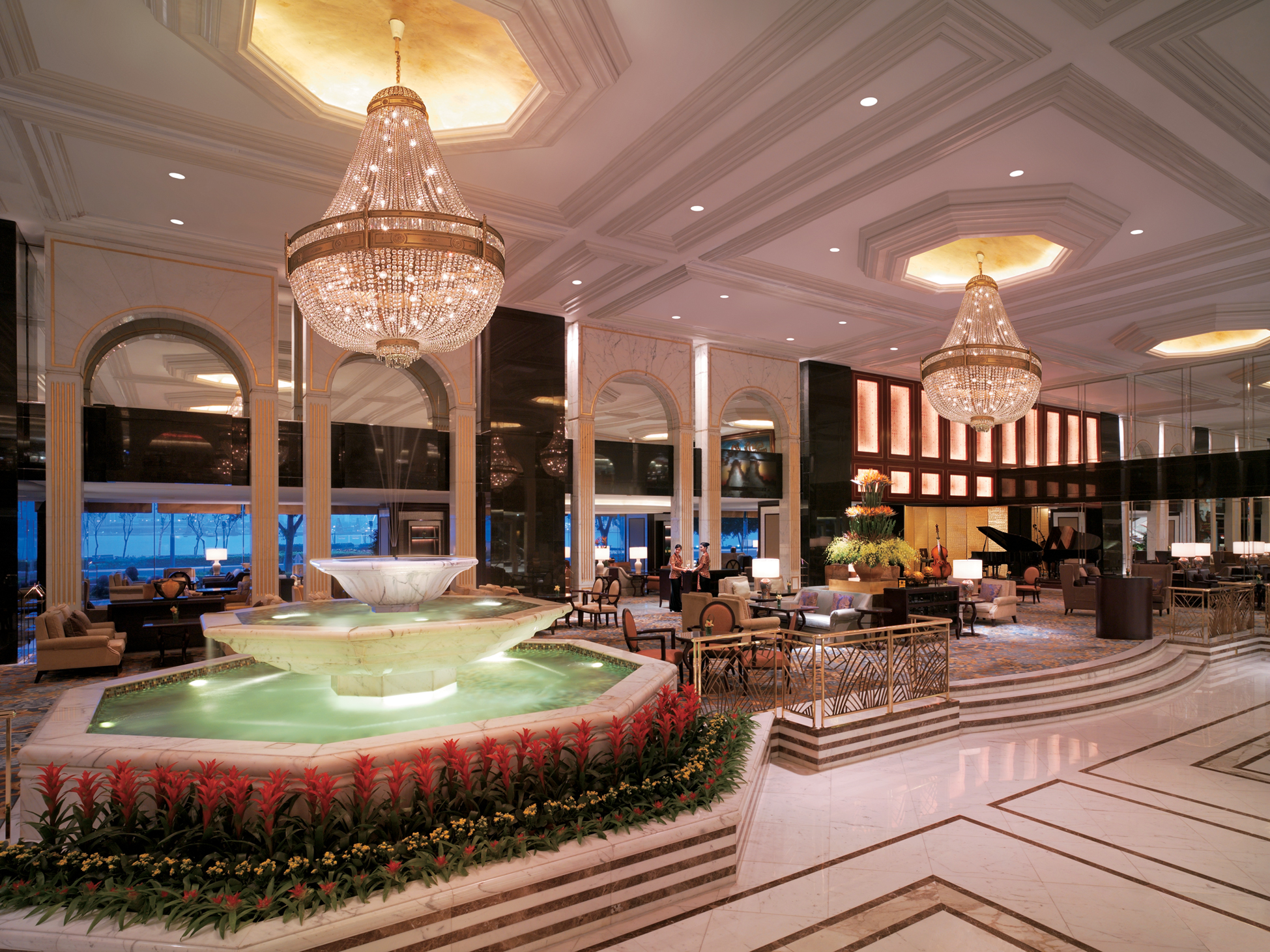
Kowloon Shangri-La Hotel lobby

Kowloon Shangri-La is located in Tsim Sha Tsui East.

The interior design, which includes a lobby created from Italian Statuario marble and two murals of the Shangri-La Valley by UK artist Malcolm Golding, was developed by Y Shibata & Associates of Japan, Don Aston Designers Asia Ltd., and Bilkey Llinas Design Ltd.

Malcolm Golding returned in 2003, 23 years after painting the original murals, to restore them. He became a tourist attraction as he used bamboo scaffolding to repaint his vision of Shangri-La as a "lush tropical valley hemmed by startling mountains, with colourful birds and huge flowering plants surrounding a stylised Chinese palace."

== Features ==
=== Rooms and suites ===
The rooms of the hotel were developed by LRF Designers Limited and number 679, of which 638 are guest rooms, and 41 are Suites.

=== Restaurants ===
The hotel holds five restaurants serving a variety of cuisines under Executive Chef, as well as a lounge and a bar, Lobby Lounge and a Tapas Bar. Both outlets were designed by Bilkey Llinas Design Ltd., and the Tapes Bar was honoured with the "Wine by The Glass Restaurant Award", organised by Restaurant & Bar Hong Kong, in 2011.

Previously, the hotel hosted the Californian restaurant Napa, described as a "Hong Kong institution" when it closed in June 2005 after 12 years. It was the first fusion restaurant of its kind to appear in a Hong Kong Hotel and was led by chef David Monson. The hotel's French bistro Margaux closed down the same year, replaced by Italian restaurant Angelini.

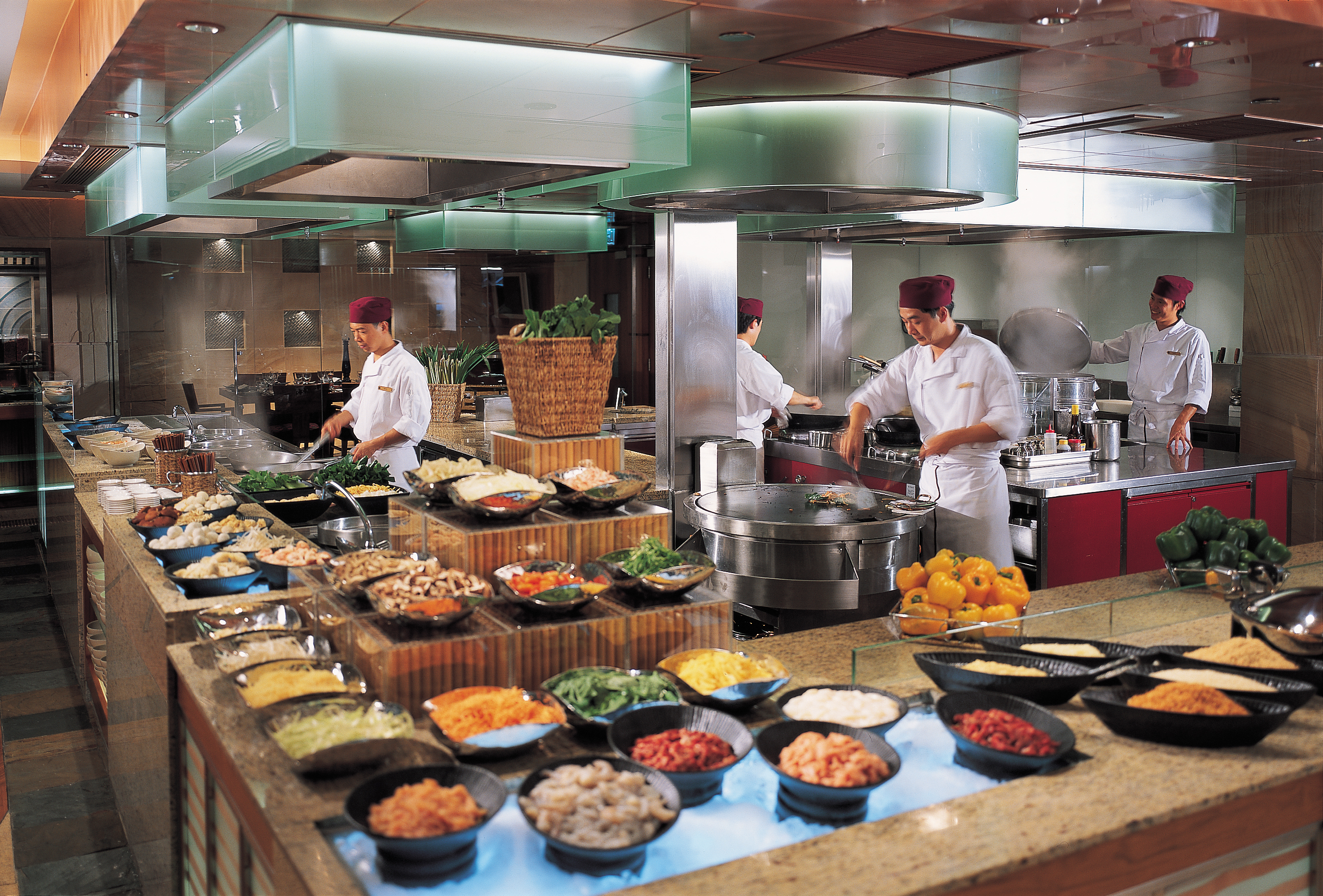
Kowloon Shangri-La Café Kool

- Angelini – Italian

Chef Alessandro Angelini leads the hotel's Italian restaurant, which was honoured as "One of Hong Kong's 50 Finest Restaurants" in Dining with Stars 2008, organised by Hong Kong Tatler and supported by Hong Kong Tourism Board. The restaurant was designed by Hong Kong based interior design firm Zanghellini & Holt Associates and has 69 seats.

- Cafe Kool – International

Led by Chef Lou Kuok Kam, Cafe Kool is the hotel's largest, with 322 seats. Serving Global cuisine, it was designed by Bilkey Llinas Design Ltd. It has a hardwood ceiling and marble surfaces. The restaurant offers a buffet.

- Nadaman – Japanese

Serving Kyoto-style Japanese cuisine in kaiseki style and also including a teppanyaki grill and sushi bar, Nadaman is led by Chef Takao Kojima and can host 138 guests. Nadaman first opened in Osaka in 1830, and the Kowloon Shangri-La restaurant which opened at the same time as the hotel, in 1981, was its first overseas outlet. Kojima spent 20 years at Nadaman in Japan before moving to Hong Kong, where here changes the mini-kaiseki menu every month.

The restaurant's interior was designed by CL3 Architects Ltd. and Kanko Kikaku Sekkeisha Consultants & Designers Ltd., Tokyo. In 2005 it was named one of the "top ten great hotel restaurants in the world" by Hotels Magazine. In 2010, the kaiseki cuisine Japanese fine dining restaurant, Nadaman, was listed along with its sister outlet at the Island Shangri-La, as the 'Best Japanese restaurant' on the Hong Kong Best Eats 2010 list compiled by CNN Travel in 2010.

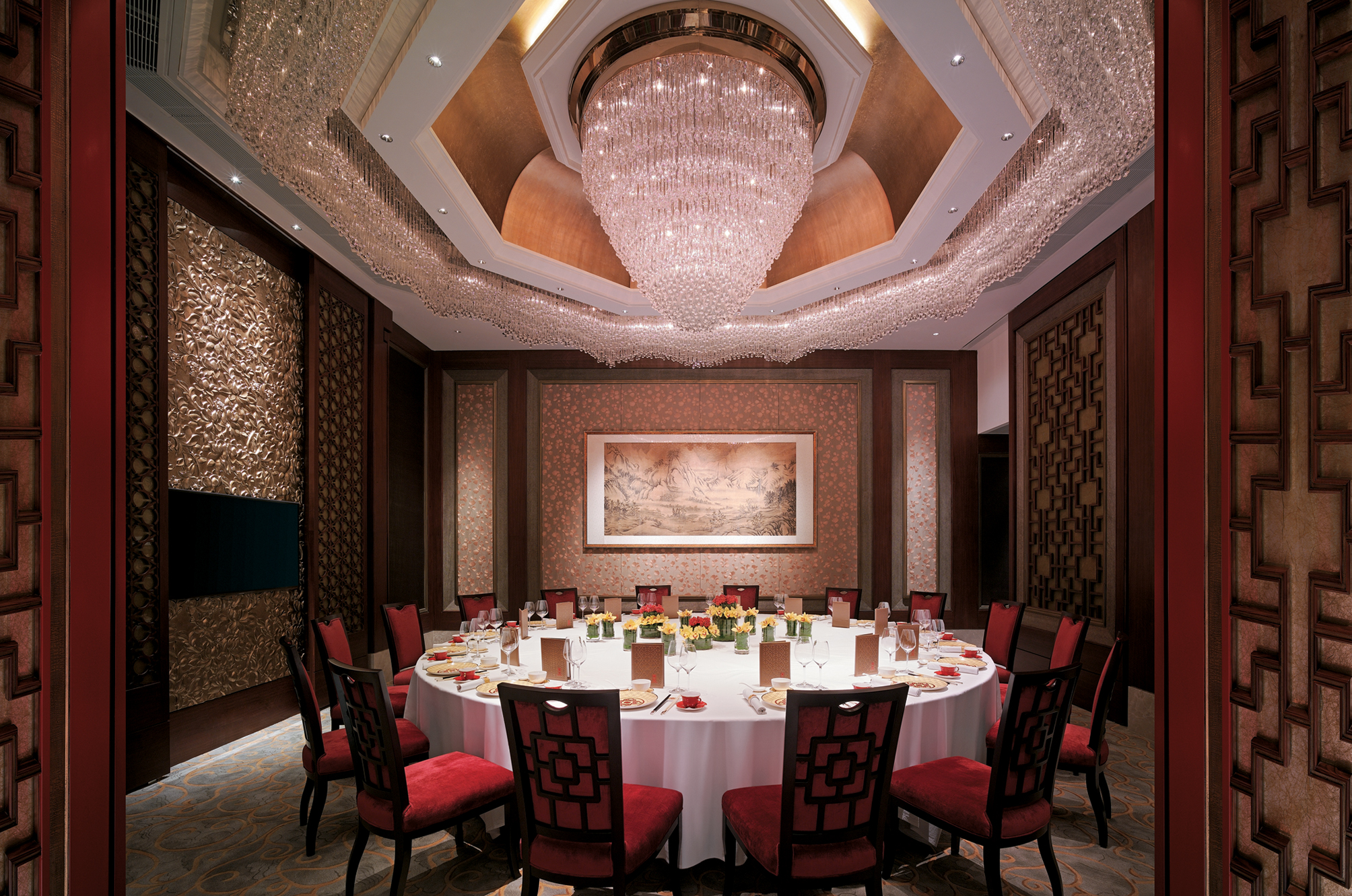
Michelin two-starred Shang Palace's grand private dining room

- Shang Palace – Chinese

Shang Palace, led by Chef Cheung Long Yin is a one-Michelin-starred Cantonese restaurant, received in the Michelin Guide's 2020 Hong Kong and Macau edition. Designed by LRF Designers Ltd., it holds 160. The restaurant was entirely refurbished and reopened in September 2012.

- Deli Kool – Delicatessen

Chef Jonathan Gallet created bread, pastries and desserts at the 24-seater delicatessen located at the hotel's mezzanine.

== Corporate social responsibility ==
Kowloon Shangri-La, Hong Kong has worked with a number of local charitable organisations such as Christian Action, offering financial assistance to guest donation programs, as well as arranging numerous charity visits to those in need, and sponsoring venues for charity events. Projects include a School visit and Easter egg-painting workshop for students from Ebenezer School & Home for The Visually Impaired, a Tree-Planting Challenge organised by Friends of the Earth, a Mid-Autumn Festival Lunch Party for elderly in collaboration with The Rotary Club of Channel Islands, and food donation and serving to refugees and asylum seekers at Chung King Mansion in association with Foodlink.

== See also ==
- Shangri-La Hotels and Resorts
- List of buildings and structures in Hong Kong
