= JW Marriott Hotel Hong Kong =

Hotel in Hong Kong, China

Coordinates: 22.27781°N 114.16549°E

JW Marriott Hotel Hong Kong 香港JW萬豪酒店
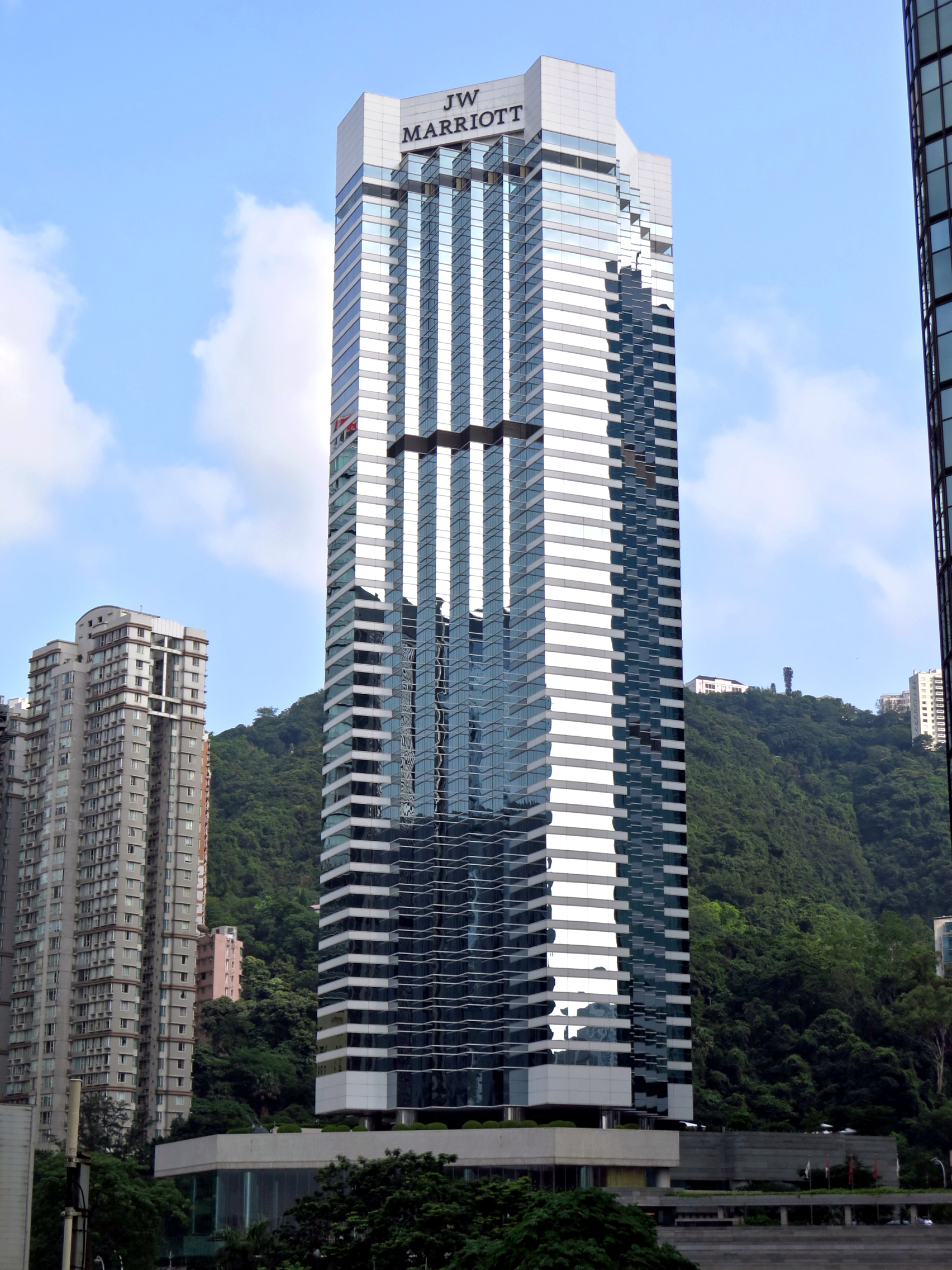
- JW Marriott Hotel Hong Kong

General information
- Location: Pacific Place, 88 Queensway, Admiralty, Hong Kong
- Opening: 27 February 1989; 37 years ago
- Operator: Marriott International

Design and construction
- Developer: Hong Leong Group (80%); Swire Properties (20%)

Other information
- Number of rooms: 581
- Number of suites: 27
- Number of restaurants: 8

Website
- www.jwmarriotthongkong.com

JW Marriott Hotel Hong Kong
- Traditional Chinese: 香港JW萬豪酒店
Transcriptions
Yue: Cantonese
- Yale Romanization: Hēung góng JW maahn hòuh jáu dim
- Jyutping: Hoeng1 gong2 JW maan6 hou4 zau2 dim3

JW Marriott Hotel Hong Kong is a 5-star hotel located in the Pacific Place complex in Admiralty, Hong Kong, next to Wan Chai and Central. It opened on 27 February 1989 and is the first Marriott International hotel in the Asia-Pacific region. The upper floors of the building are occupied by Upper House Hong Kong.

The hotel has 581 guestrooms and 27 suites with panoramic views of the city, harbour and mountains. It offers 8 restaurants including Michelin-starred Man Ho Chinese Restaurant, JW Café, The Lounge, alfresco Fish Bar, Flint, Pool Lounge, Bar Q88 and Dolce 88. The hotel also has 18 function rooms, a 24-hour fully equipped fitness centre, massage treatments, an outdoor pool, business services and 24-hour in-room dining.

== History ==
JW Marriott Hotel Hong Kong was opened in the first phase of development of Pacific Place, a complex of office towers, hotels and a shopping centre situated at 88 Queensway, in Admiralty, Hong Kong. The hotel was part of phase one out of three; the second phase opened in 1991, and the third and final phase in 2004.

Pacific Place contains three other luxury hotels, the Island Shangri-La, the Conrad Hong Kong, and Upper House Hong Kong respectively. The complex is directly connected to Admiralty station, part of Hong Kong's MTR that opened in 1979 and is located in Admiralty, at the eastern extension of Hong Kong's central business district.

== Awards ==
Hotel

- TTG Asia Travel Awards 2024 – Best Hotel in Hong Kong
- Condé Nast Traveller Readers' Choice Awards 2024
- DestinAsian Readers' Choice Awards 2024

MICE & Business Travel

- M&C Asia Stella Awards 2024 – Best Meetings Hotel (Hong Kong)
- TTG China Travel Awards 2024 – Best Meeting & Conventions Hotel in Hong Kong
- Business Traveller Asia-Pacific Awards 2024 – Best Business Hotel in Hong Kong

Sustainability

- 2024-2025 Green Key Certificate

Food & Beverage

- MICHELIN Guide Hong Kong Macau 2024 One-star recognition – Man Ho Chinese Restaurant
- Tatler Best 100 Restaurants in Asia 2024 – Man Ho Chinese Restaurant
- Tatler Dining 20 Hong Kong 2024 – Man Ho Chinese Restaurant
- Harper's Bazaar 2024 BAZAAR Taste Elite 20 – Man Ho Chinese Restaurant
- Weekend Weekly Best-ever Buffet Restaurant Award 2024 – JW Café
- The Loop HK Eats Awards 2024 – Fish Bar
