= List of district police stations in Hong Kong =

This is a list of district police stations in Hong Kong, by police district.

== Headquarters ==
- Hong Kong Police Headquarters, Wan Chai

== Hong Kong Island ==
- Central
- Waterfront
- Peak (sub-station)
- Western
- Aberdeen
- Stanley (sub-station)
- Wan Chai
- Happy Valley
- North Point
- Chai Wan

== Kowloon East ==
- Wong Tai Sin
- Sai Kung
- Kwun Tong
- Tseung Kwan O
- Sau Mau Ping
- Ngau Tau Kok

== Kowloon West ==
- Tsim Sha Tsui
- Yau Ma Tei
- Sham Shui Po
- Cheung Sha Wan
- Mong Kok District
- Kowloon City
- Hung Hom

== New Territories South ==
- Kwai Chung
- Tsing Yi
- Tsuen Wan
- Sha Tin
- Tin Sum
- Ma On Shan
- Lantau North
- Lantau South (Mui Wo)
- Airport Police Station
- Penny's Bay Police Post

== New Territories North ==
- Tai Po
- Sheung Shui
- Tuen Mun
- Castle Peak
- Yuen Long
- Tin Shui Wai
- Pat Heung
- Sha Tau Kok
- Lok Ma Chau
- Ta Kwu Ling

== Marine ==
- Marine Harbour Division
- Marine East Division
- Marine South Division
- Marine West Division
- Marine North Division
- Cheung Chau
- Lamma Island Police Post
- Peng Chau Police Post

== See also ==
- Historic police buildings in Hong Kong
- List of buildings and structures in Hong Kong
