= Pacific Place (Hong Kong) =

Building complex in Admiralty, Hong Kong

- 太古廣場

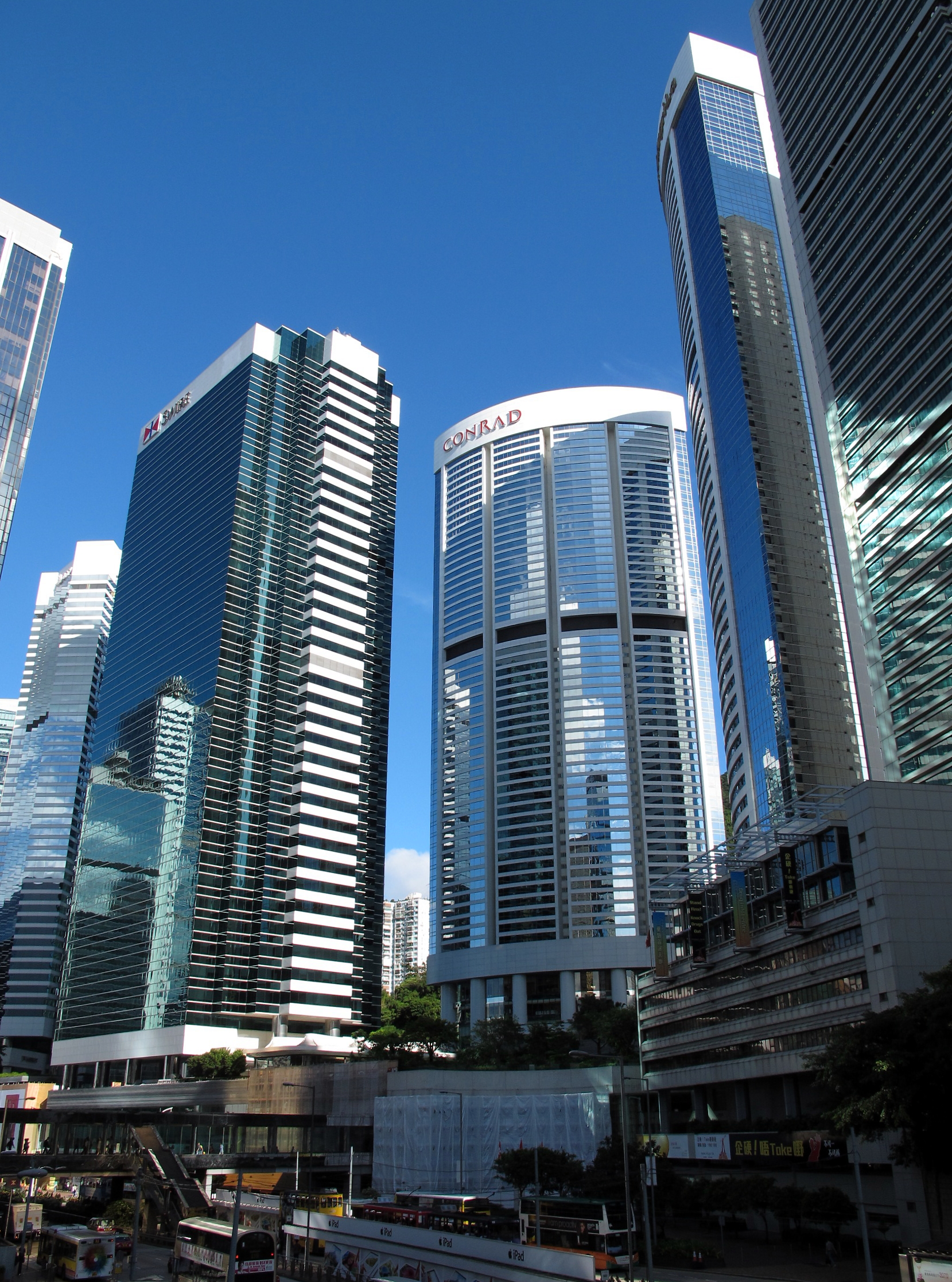
- View of Pacific Place entrance from Queensway in July 2012
- Location: Admiralty, Hong Kong
- Coordinates: 22°16′38.17″N 114°9′53.75″E
- Address: 88 Queensway, Admiralty (One Pacific Place and Two Pacific Place) 1 Queen's Road East, Wan Chai (Three Pacific Place); 28 Hennessy Road, Wan Chai (Five Pacific Place) 50 Queen's Road East, Wan Chai (Six Pacific Place)
- Opened: 1988; 38 years ago
- Developer: Swire Properties
- Floor area: Over 710,000 sq ft (66,000 m^{2})
- Floors: 4 (shopping mall)
- Parking: 500 parking spaces
- Website: www.pacificplace.com.hk

Chinese name
- Traditional Chinese: 太古廣場
- Simplified Chinese: 太古广场
- Literal meaning: Swire/Taikoo Plaza
Transcriptions
Standard Mandarin
- Hanyu Pinyin: Tàigǔ Guǎngchǎng
Yue: Cantonese
- Yale Romanization: taai3 gu2 gwong2 coeng4

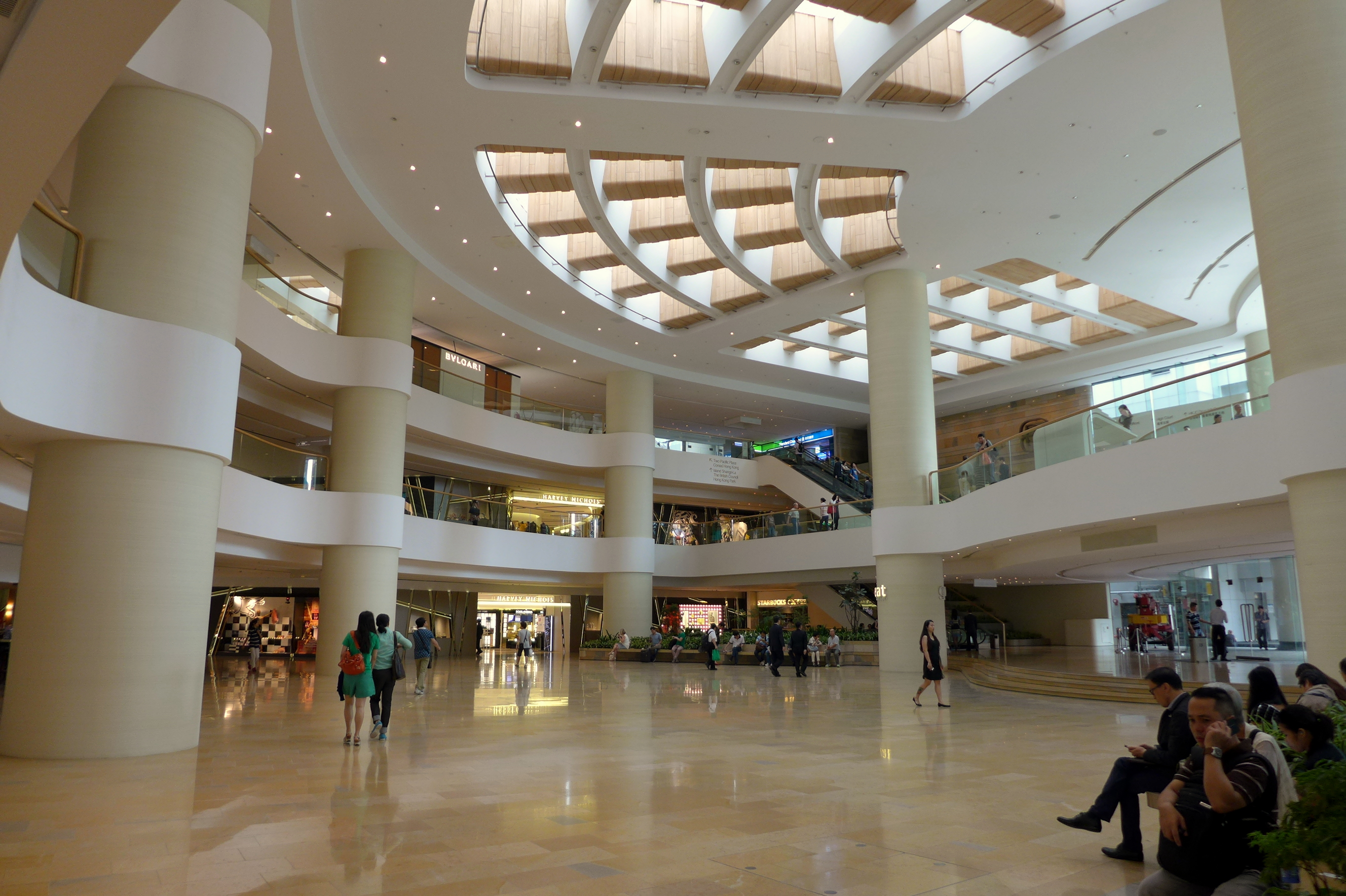
Pacific Place Mall

Pacific Place is a complex of five office towers, three hotels and one shopping centre situated on Queensway and Henessey Road, Admiralty and Wan Chai, Hong Kong. The latest phase, Six Pacific Place, is located at 50 Queen's Road East, Wan Chai.

The four-level shopping centre is home to over 160 shops and boutiques and one major department store. The complex is also home to three five-star hotels, a boutique hotel, three office towers and 270 serviced apartments, all of which are pet friendly.

Pacific Place complex is owned and managed by Swire Properties, with the exception of three of the hotels (Conrad Hong Kong, Island Shangri-La and JW Marriott Hotel), in each of which it retains a 20 per cent equity interest.

== History ==
Pacific Place was developed by Swire Properties. Phases One and Two were built on land formerly part of Victoria Barracks, one of the first military compounds in Hong Kong. The land was auctioned by the Hong Kong Government during redevelopment and was successfully bid for by Swire. It was purchased in two tranches in 1985 and 1986 for a total cost of US$1 billion. During construction, a banyan tree was preserved for HK$23.9-26 million. Phase One opened in 1988. The Conrad International Hotel was opened on 14 September 1990. Phase Three, built by Gammon Construction, was completed in 2004. It was developed from old buildings on Star Street, Wan Chai.

Pacific Place underwent a major renovation that was completed in 2011. It involved interior, exterior, and architectural changes designed by Thomas Heatherwick which cost more than HK$2.1 billion.

== Phases ==
Pacific Place comprises 5 Grade A office towers (One Pacific Place, Two Pacific Place, Three Pacific Place, Five Pacific Place, and Six Pacific Place), 4 five star hotels (Conrad Hong Kong, Island Shangri-La, JW Marriott Hotel Hong Kong, and Upper House Hong Kong), and serviced apartments (Pacific Place Apartments) offering a total of 270 units.

- One Pacific Place
  - One Pacific Place Office
  - JW Marriott Hotel Hong Kong
  - The Upper House Hong Kong
- Two Pacific Place
  - Two Pacific Place Office
  - Island Shangri-La
    - Two Pacific Place and Island Shangri-La hotel occupy respectively the bottom half and the top half of the tallest tower of the complex, which is 213 metres high and has 56 floors.
  - Conrad Hong Kong
  - Pacific Place Apartments
- Three Pacific Place
  - Three Pacific Place Office
- Five Pacific Place
  - Five Pacific Place Office
    - Five Pacific Place is a 24-storey building with 146,000 gross floor area. Offering a uniquely designed ‘sky’ garden on the second floor.
- Six Pacific Place
  - Six Pacific Place Office
    - Six Pacific Place is a 24-storey building with 218,000 gross floor area where exceptional comes to happen. With thoughtful planning that assumes a long-term view focused on placemaking, sustainability and a smart portfolio.
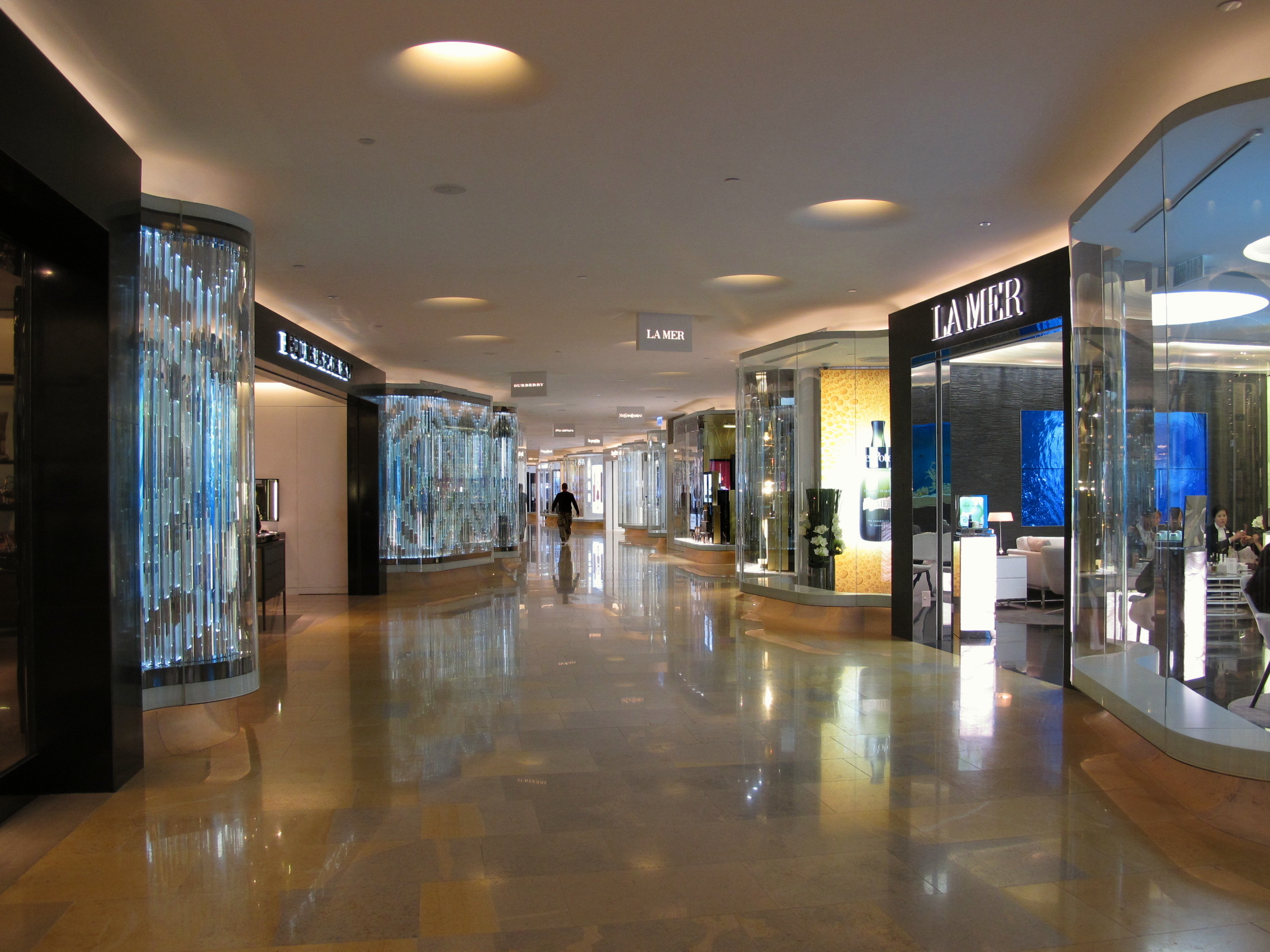
The Beauty Gallery in Level 1

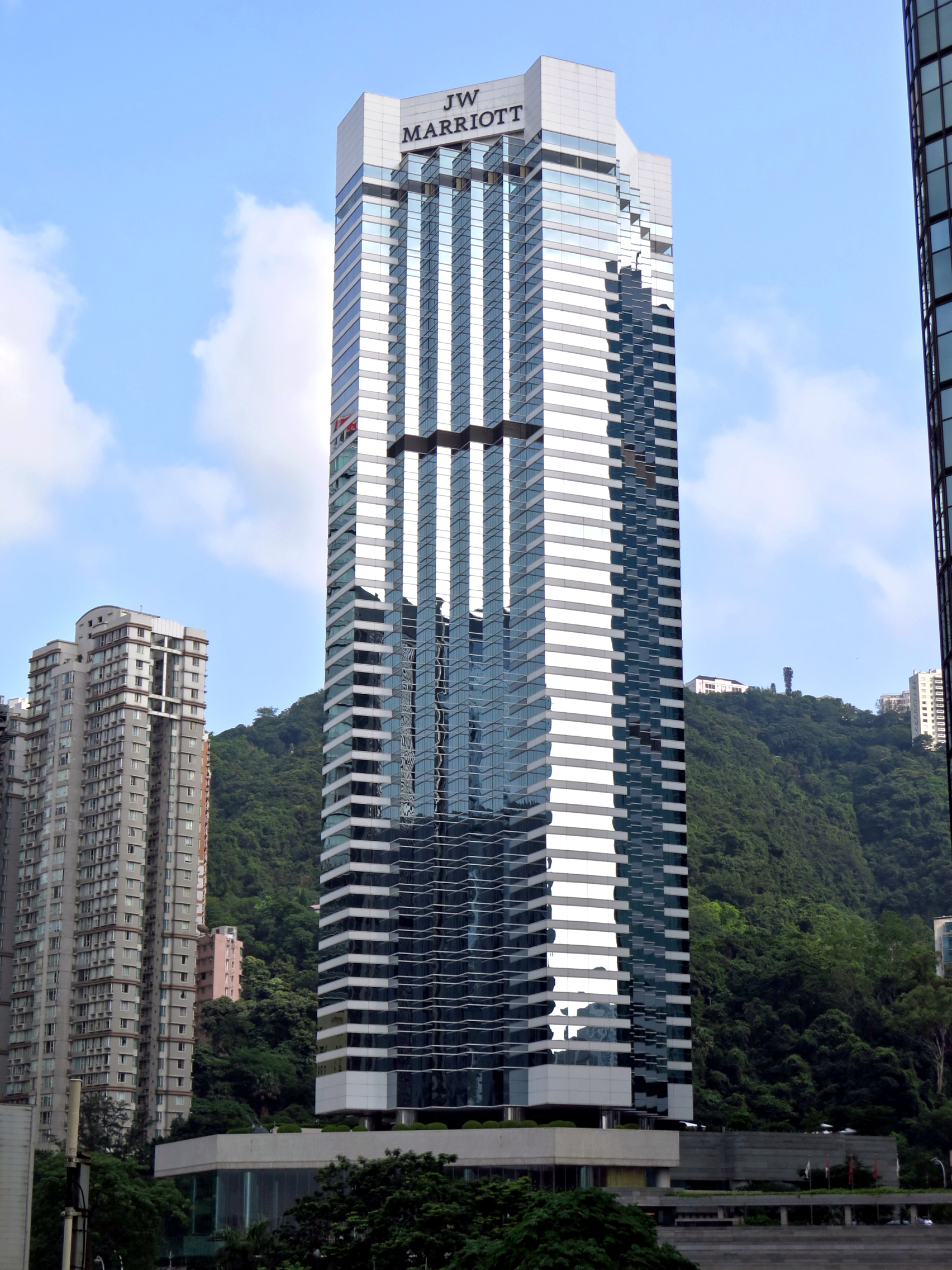
JW Marriott Hotel Hong Kong

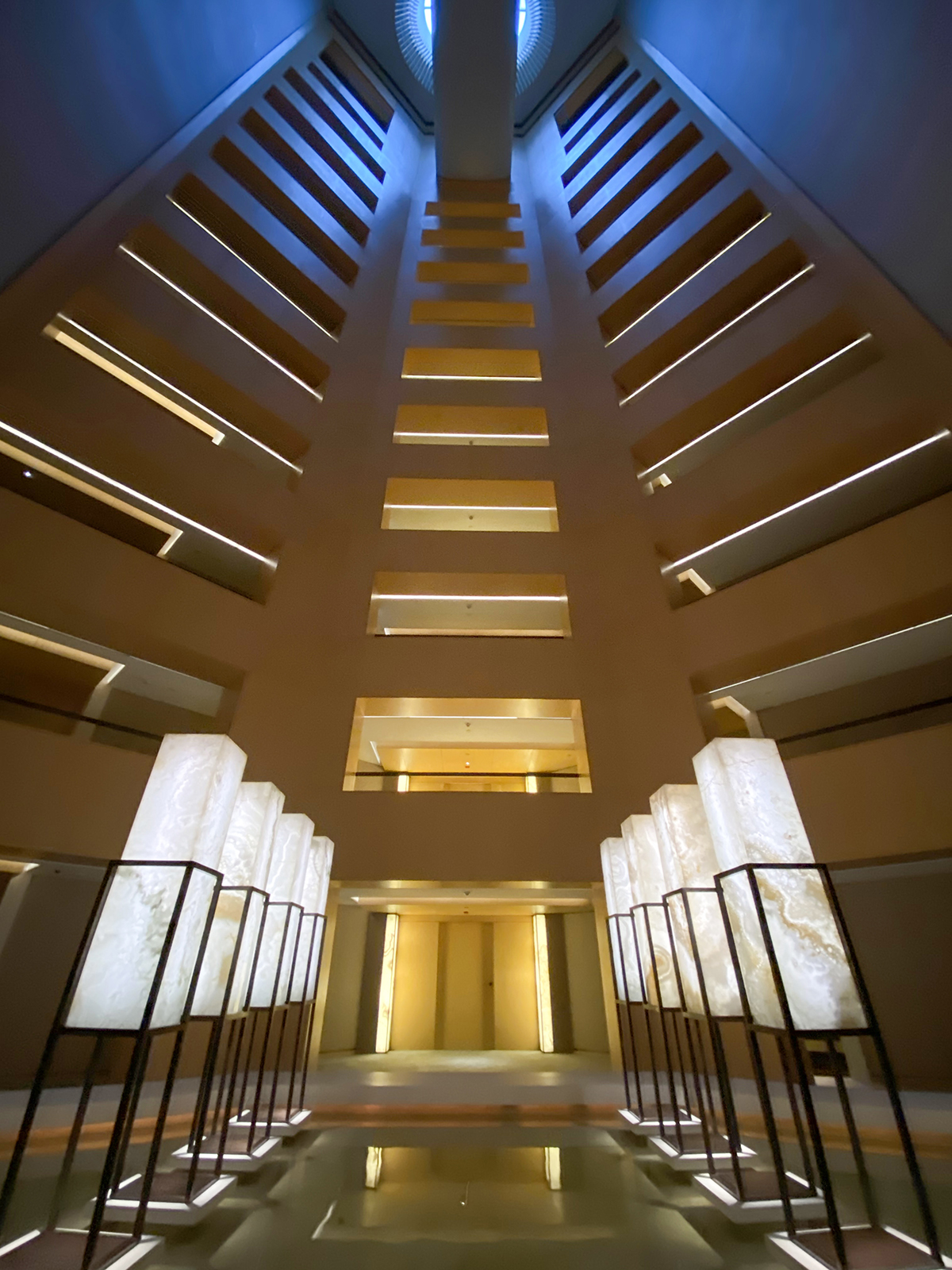
The Upper House

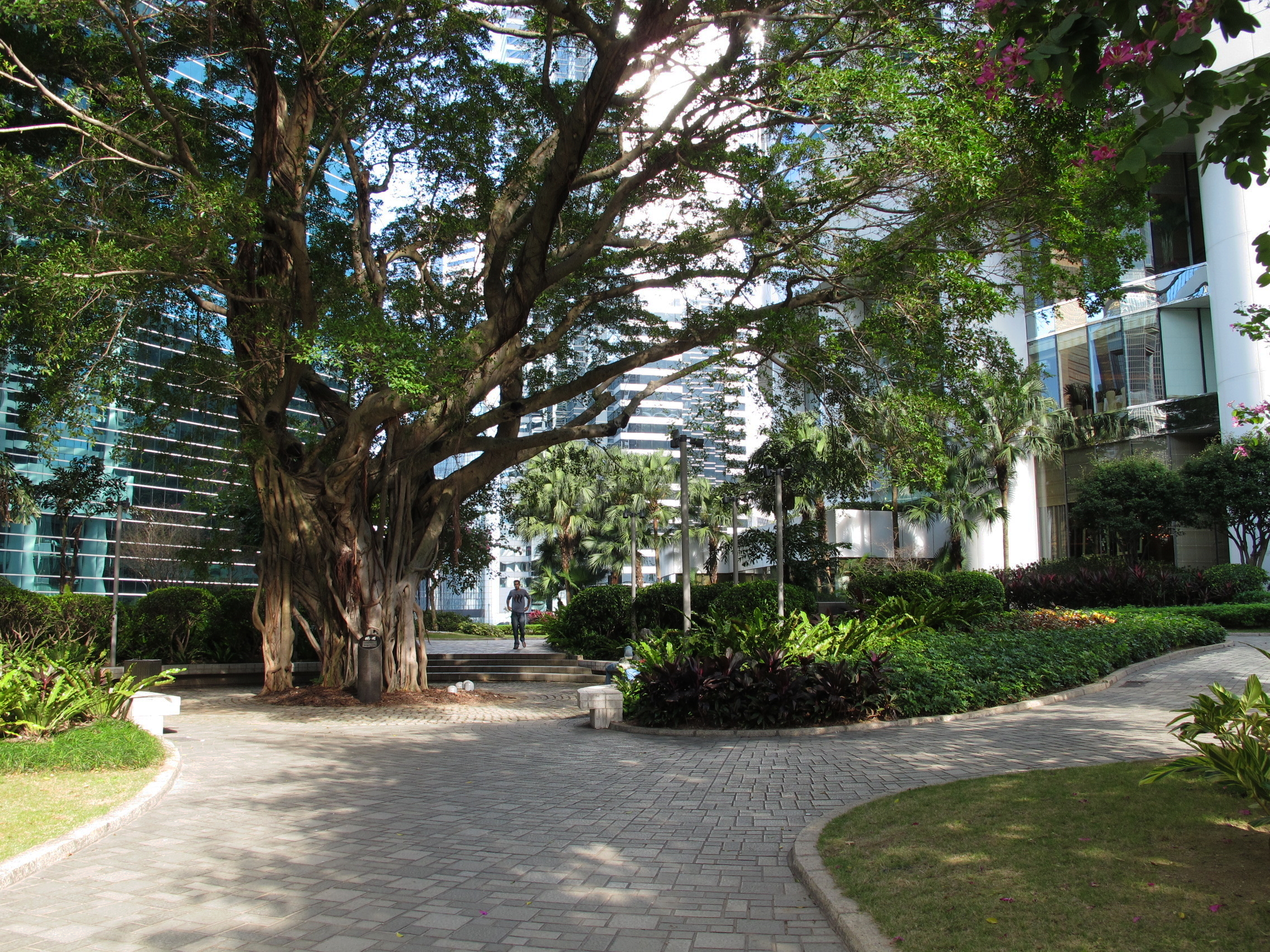
Preserved banyan tree at Pacific Place

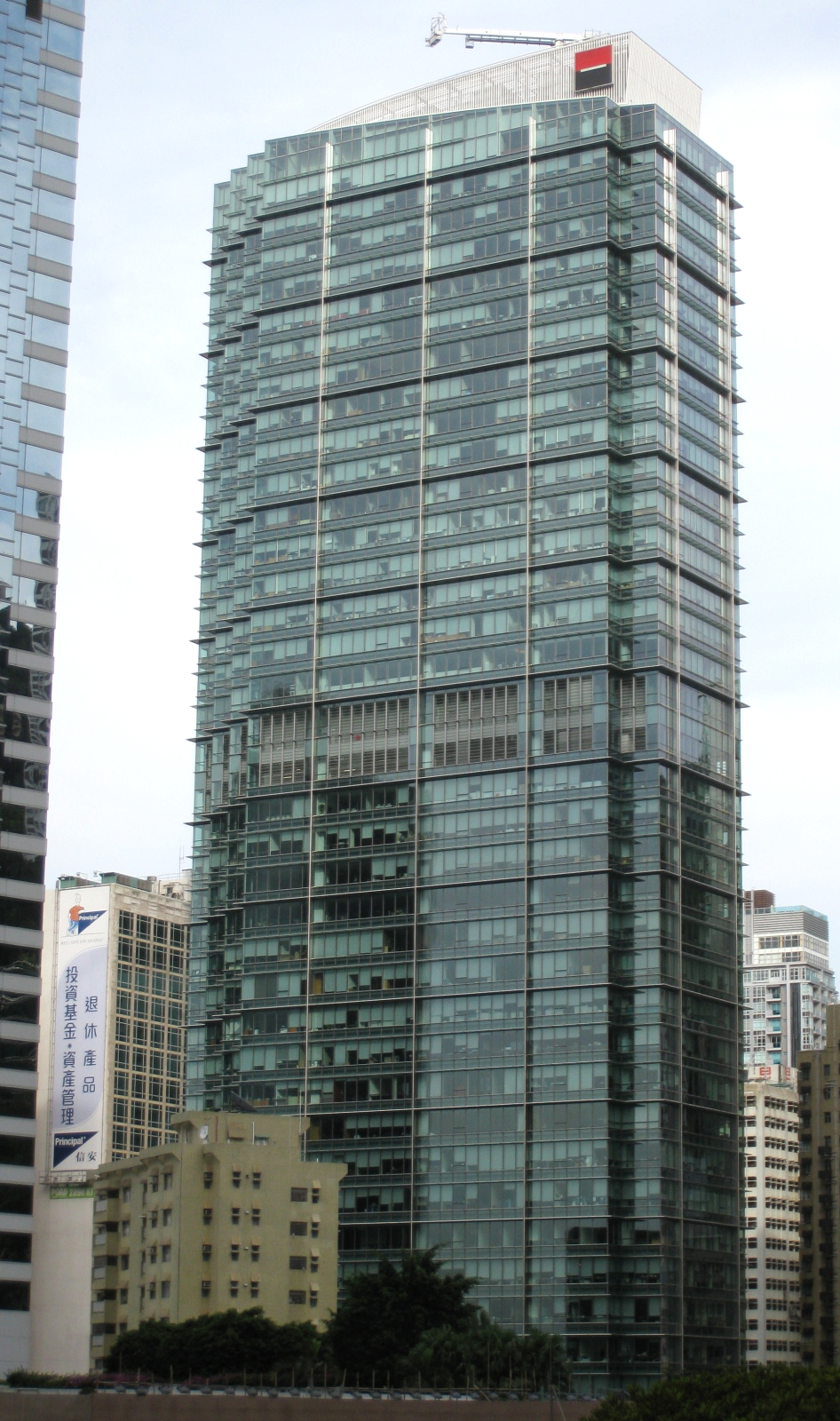
Three Pacific Place

== Shopping centre ==
The four-level shopping arcade currently houses approximately 160 boutiques and the Harvey Nichols department store. A footbridge connects it across Queensway to Queensway Plaza and United Centre. It is connected by tunnels to the Admiralty MTR station and Three Pacific Place. Escalators connect it to Hong Kong Park.

Pacific Place Phase 1 began leasing in December 1988 and officially opened in March 1989. The expanded Phase 2 opened fully in July 1990 as its superstructure neared completion.

Basement (LG1)

In its early years, the basement of Pacific Place Phase 1 housed several restaurants, including the high end Chinese restaurant Zen, Oliver's Super Sandwiches, Maxim's Peking Garden and Kam Kong Chun Chinese restaurants, and two Western establishments. In June 1995, Oliver's Super Sandwiches was replaced by EAT, an American fast food outlet, while one of the Western restaurants was converted into La Fourchette. In 2004, EAT closed and was replaced by the American fast food cafe, Café MET (formerly Metropolitan Café).

Starting in 2008, the basement underwent a tenant restructuring. Zen closed its original location to make way for Thai Basil and relocated to the space previously occupied by Peking Garden and Kam Kong Chun. Peking Garden then reopened at the former site of Thai Basil in December. La Fourchette closed in August 2009 and was replaced by the Mediterranean restaurant Zelo, which opened in December 2009. Zen eventually closed in August 2013, with its space taken over by Tian Yi Chinese Restaurant in December 2013. Additionally, Maxim's m.a.x. concepts introduced the Thai themed Thai Basil and Japanese themed Kokomi in 2002 and 2015, respectively.

Prior to May 2000, the basement of Phase 2 housed the Seibu "COO" Food Court and a ParknShop. In December 2000, this space was converted into the gourmet supermarket Great Food Hall, occupying 34,000 square feet. The remainder of the Phase 2 basement is dedicated to parking.

As of 2026, the basement remains anchored by Great Food Hall and features a diverse range of dining and lifestyle services. Key tenants include Peking Garden, The Hawk & Aster, wellwellwell, La Vache!, Uoharu.

Level 1

Level 1 of Pacific Place houses numerous fashion brands, including Agnès b., Ted Baker, and Zara. Other retailers include Jo Malone、L'Occitane En Provence, and LensCrafters.

The AMC Pacific Place cinema opened on 9 December 2006, featuring futuristic design elements such as suspended ticket counters and a U shaped "time tunnel" corridor. It offered 6 auditoriums with over 600 seats, including a 39 seat VIP suite with private restrooms. On 17 March 2020, the cinema was rebranded as MOViE MOViE Pacific Place after Broadway Circuit took over the operations following the expiry of AMC's franchise.

The floor once housed a 12,000 square foot Marks & Spencer, which opened in 1991. Following the expiry of its lease in June 2005, the space was subdivided into four units, with half the area leased to the Spanish retailer Zara. Other tenants included Wise-Kids and Ted Baker.

Phase 2 previously featured a food court named Food Fare. In late 2001, it was renovated into a "premium dining" area with 329 seats, retaining tenants like Café de Coral and KFC while introducing new outlets such as Momo. The food court closed in 2006 and was replaced by a Lane Crawford.

Seibu Hong Kong was also a major anchor tenant from 1989 until June 2011; its 22 year lease was followed by the opening of a Harvey Nichols flagship store in October 2011.

Following Lane Crawford's departure in January 2012, Burberry leased a significant portion of the space. In August 2012, The Beauty Gallery opened, featuring nine international beauty and skincare brands: Chanel, BEYORG, Giorgio Armani, Joyce Beauty, La Mer, La Prairie, Natura Bissé, Shu Uemura, and Yves Saint Laurent.

On 12 November 2015, Swire Properties and Burberry reached an agreement regarding a restructuring plan for their Pacific Place tenancy. The store, spanning two levels and 21,500 square feet, was Burberry's first Hong Kong flagship and, at the time, its largest globally. Land Registry records indicated that Burberry commenced the lease in May 2012, with the contract running until May 2018. The monthly rent for that year was HK$3.65 million plus 15% of the store's revenue, with the calculated rent for 2017 being approximately HK$2 million.

In February 2016, the American restaurant Dan Ryan's, which had operated for 27 years, was not offered a lease renewal and closed in April, with an Italian restaurant taking its place. Grappa's Ristorante, which opened in 1990, also relocated in July, with the space leased by the prominent Hong Kong F&B group Dining Concepts. In December of the same year, Burberry chose not to renew the lease for its lower level space, which was subsequently occupied by Pure Yoga, opening on 1 September 2017.

As of 2026, Level L1 serves as a hub for international fashion, beauty, and lifestyle brands. Key tenants include Lane Crawford, lululemon, Adidas, On, Maje, and American Vintage. Dining options include Ralph's Coffee, Shake Shack, Shiro, and Venchi.

Level L2

Level L2 of Pacific Place is a concentration of upscale fashion brands, primarily including Bally, I.T、Joyce、Lanvin、Montblanc及Sandro. The café C'est La B, the bookshop Kelly & Walsh, and the mall's first hair and nail salon, Il Colpo, officially opened in August 2012. Other stores on the same level include King & Country and Chinese Arts & Crafts. Smythson's first boutique in Hong Kong opened at Pacific Place in June 2013. The northern side of this floor features a footbridge link to Queensway Plaza.

As of 2026, Level L2 houses a collection of international high-end fashion brands, lifestyle boutiques, and elegant dining venues. The floor features the Harvey Nichols department store, alongside flagship boutiques such as Louis Vuitton (dual-level), Burberry, Balmain, Chloé, Loro Piana and Miu Miu. Jewelry and timepiece brands include IWC Schaffhausen, Messika, and Omega. Lifestyle and service tenants include Kelly & Walsh bookstore, IL COLPO Hair. Nails, HSBC Premier Centre, and Watsons. Dining options feature Apinara Thai Cuisine & Bar, Fuel Espresso, and Lady M.

Level L3

Level L3 of Pacific Place serves as a hub for luxury flagship stores, featuring prominent brands such as Louis Vuitton, Dior, Hermès, Gucci, Cartier, Goyard and Loewe. The floor formerly housed Lane Crawford's menswear department, a 6,000-square-foot portion of which was replaced by the Chinese restaurant Ye Shanghai in January 1999. Other tenants that opened during that period included European luxury retailers PRADA, Chanel and Loro Piana. Following a tenant restructuring in 2007, the area transitioned into a jewelry and watch zone, featuring Jaeger-LeCoultre, Piaget, Richard Mille, Blancpain, Tiffany & Co. and Bulgari.

In 2002, the mall introduced Chanel's first accessories-focused boutique and Burberry's first Asian concept store, occupying 3,200 square feet. Additionally, Gucci renovated and expanded its existing premises to over 4,000 square feet, adding a new entrance.

The third floor of Phase 1 originally featured an indoor garden providing a recreational space for visitors; however, it was replaced by the high end restaurant Cova in June 1999.

As of 2026, Level L3 gathers premier global luxury brands across fashion, jewelry, and timepieces, alongside fine dining establishments. Key fashion tenants include CELINE, DIOR, FENDI, Gucci and Hermès. The floor also features esteemed jewelry and watch boutiques such as Blancpain, Boucheron, BVLGARI, Cartier and CHAUMET. Dining options include ARMANI / CAFFÈ, Caviar House & Prunier, and Ye Shanghai.

Renovation

In 1998, Swire Properties invited renowned American designer James Carpenter to oversee the renovation of Pacific Place. The project included refurbishing restrooms on various floors and installing a new glass staircase connecting levels 2 and 3 to enhance pedestrian flow.

In July 2008, Swire Properties announced a HK$1.5 billion revitalization and renovation plan for Pacific Place. As part of this, the serviced apartments, The Atrium, were converted into a hotel named "The Upper House", now known as “Upper House Hong Kong”, offering 117 rooms and completing in the fourth quarter of 2009. The first phase of the mall's renovation involved remodeling restrooms from the Ground Floor to Level 2 using streamlined wood to create a wave effect, and replacing the original elevators in Phase 1 with transparent elevators traversing from the basement parking to Level 4 to improve connectivity. Additionally, new parking lobbies were constructed in the basements of Phase 1 and Phase 2, linked by escalators for greater convenience. The Garden Court atrium in Phase 1 was also refurbished with large chandeliers and new stone flooring, while the high end restaurant Domani (occupying 4,843 sq. ft.) was added on Level 4. The second phase of renovation was completed by late 2011. The entire project was led by acclaimed British designer Thomas Heatherwick, with the final cost reaching HK$2.1 billion.

To complement the mall's new exterior and interior aesthetic, Pacific Place introduced a new logo in November 2009 to replace the version used since the 1980s. The new logo features flowing, extended lines representing the Pacific Place name, incorporating a "PP" emblem formed by two interlocking "P" letters.

In mid-2016, Pacific Place restructured its tenant mix, resulting in the relocation of long standing tenants Dan Ryan's Chicago Grill (opened in 1989) and Grappa's Ristorante (opened in 1990). The mall strengthened its dining and leisure offerings by introducing over 10 new restaurants and a large scale fitness center, Pure Yoga. Additionally, pop up stores were introduced for various festivals to attract foot traffic amidst a downturn in the retail market.

== See also ==
- List of tallest buildings in Hong Kong
- Starstreet Precinct
