= Upper House Hong Kong =

Hotel in Hong Kong

- Chinese: 奕居

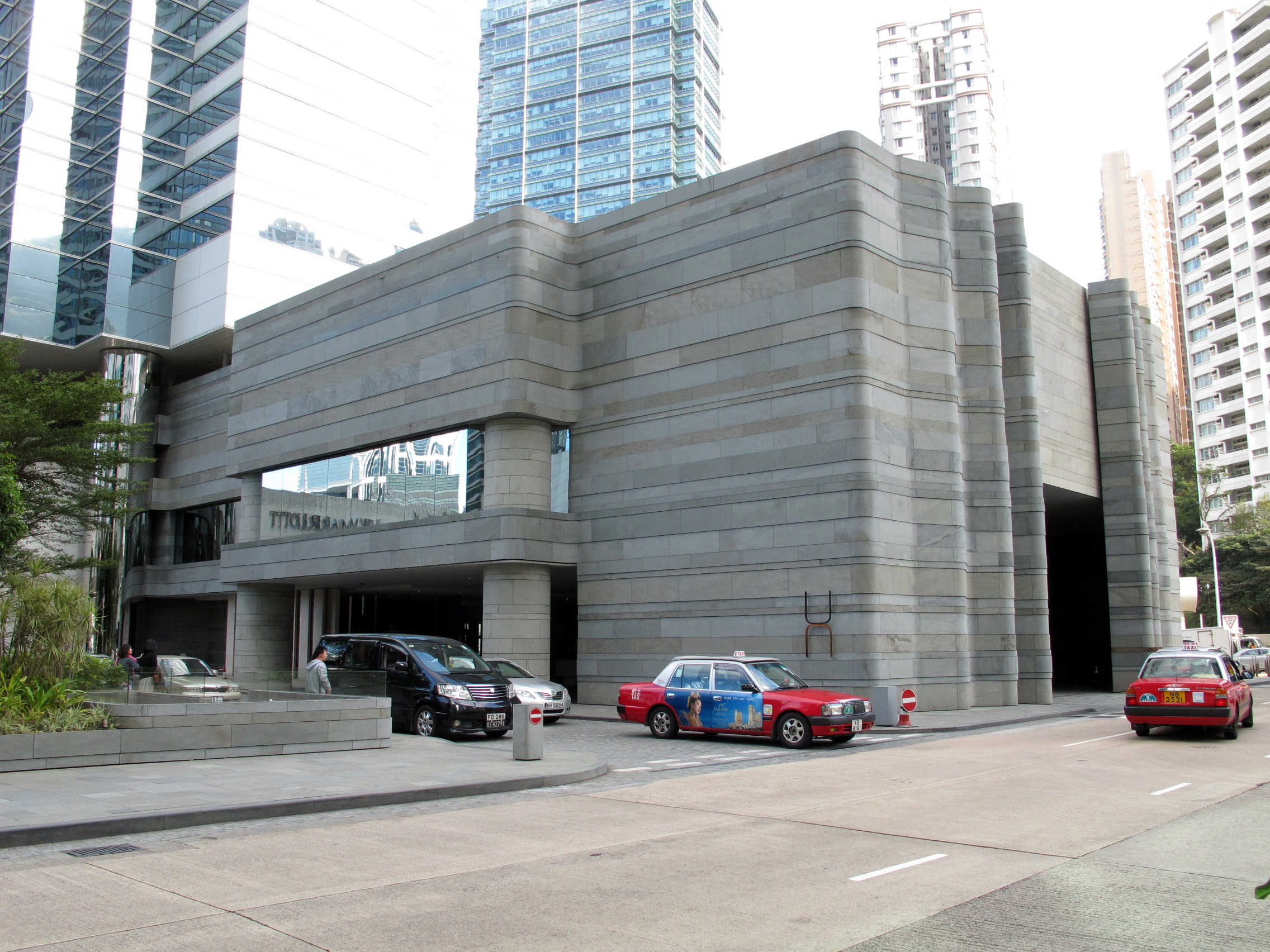
- Exterior of Upper House Hong Kong. It occupies the upper floors of the JW Marriott Hotel Hong Kong building.

- Location within Hong Kong urban core
- Hotel chain: Upper House

General information
- Location: Hong Kong, Pacific Place, 88 Queensway, Admiralty, Hong Kong
- Coordinates: 22°16′38.98″N 114°9′59.01″E
- Opening: 2 October 2009; 16 years ago
- Operator: Swire Hotels

Technical details
- Floor count: 11

Other information
- Number of rooms: 117
- Number of restaurants: 2

Website
- www.upperhouse.com/en/hongkong/

Upper House Hong Kong
- Traditional Chinese: 奕居
Transcriptions
Yue: Cantonese
- Yale Romanization: Yihk gēui
- Jyutping: Jik^{6} geoi^{1}

Upper House Hong Kong is a five-star luxury hotel located at the Pacific Place complex in Admiralty, Hong Kong. It occupies the upper floors (38 to 49) in the JW Marriott Hotel Hong Kong building. It is managed by Swire Hotels, a division of Swire Properties which is a subsidiary of Swire.

From 2023 to 2026, the hotel placed top ten each year in World's 50 Best Hotels list published by William Reed Ltd.

== History ==
Upper House Hong Kong opened in October 2009. André Fu is the designer of the hotel who has stated he wanted to create a small luxury hotel reminiscent of a private residence. The hotel was opened as the sister property to Swire Hotels’ Opposite House in Beijing. Swire Hotels also renamed its multiple other hotel properties in Chengdu and Shanghai to Upper House, as part of a global rebranding and international expansion strategy.

Upper House Hong Kong is noted to have hosted multiple high-profile individuals that include David Beckham, Victoria Beckham, Daniel Kearns, Tom Dixon and Christian Louboutin. It has become the hotel choice for those in the creative and design industries.

== Gallery ==
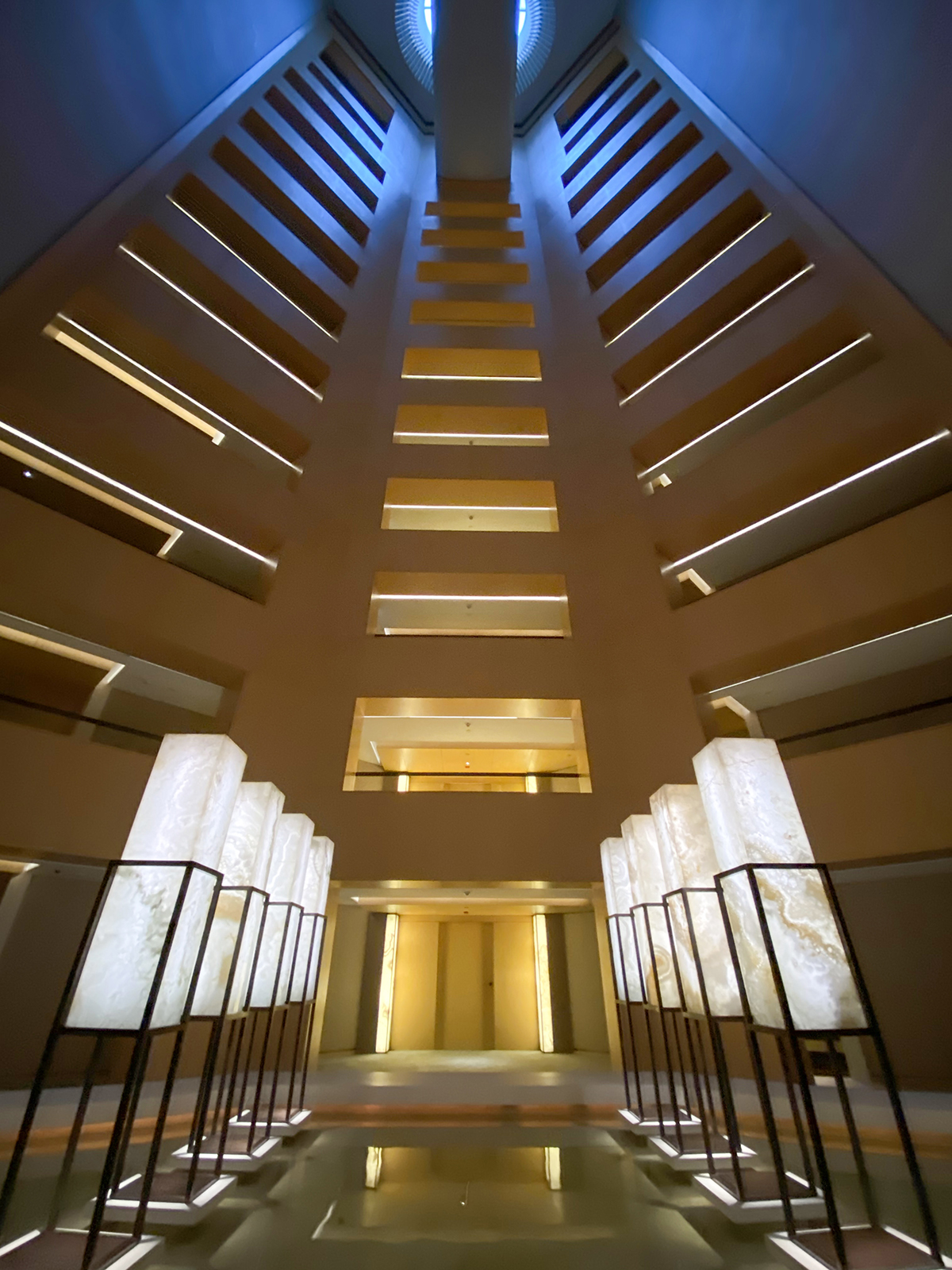
Hotel Interior

== See also ==
- JW Marriott Hotel Hong Kong
- Pacific Place
