= Queensway, Hong Kong =

Road in Admiralty, Hong Kong

Queensway
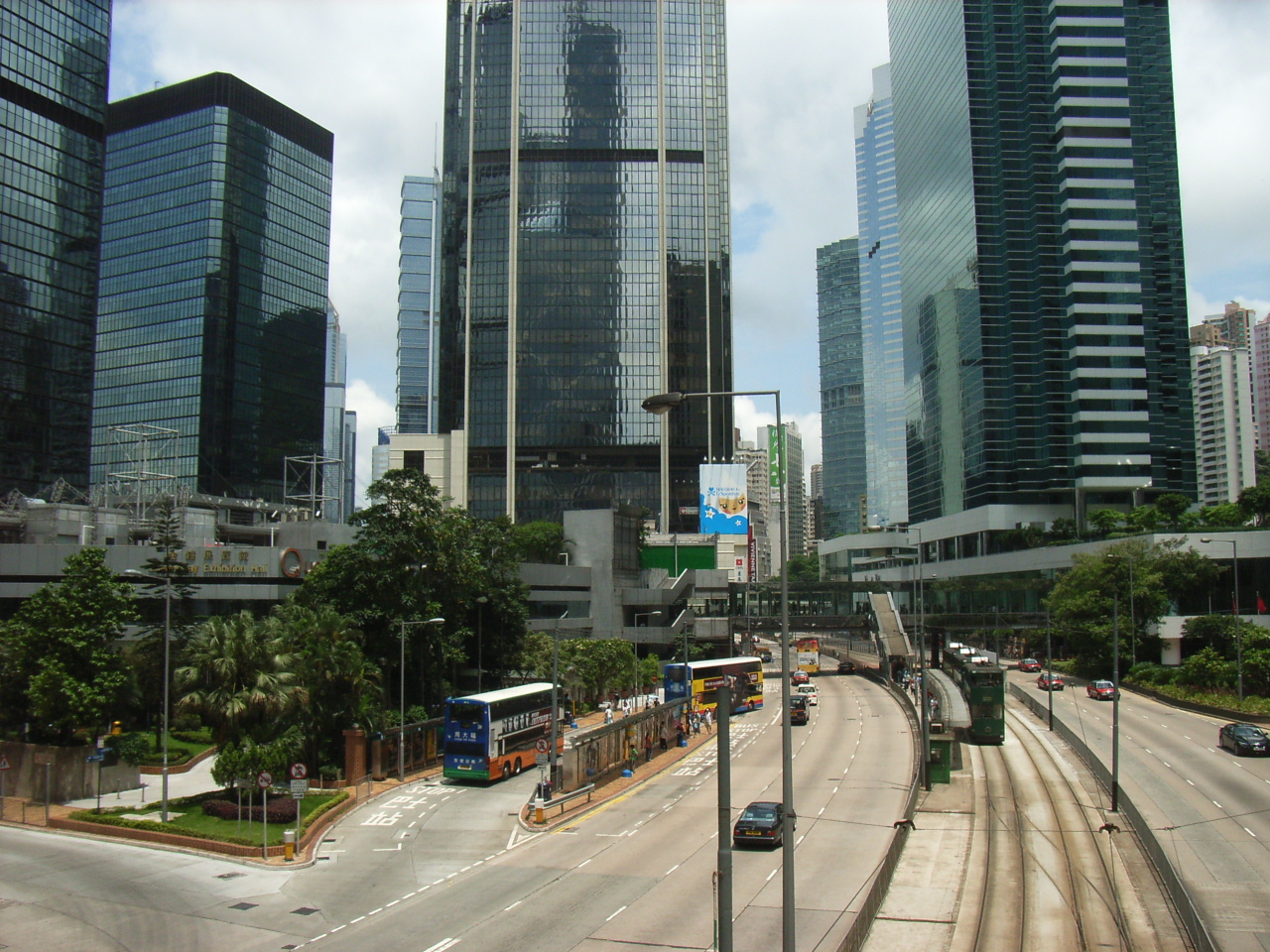
- Queensway in May 2006
- Interactive map of Queensway
- Native name: 金鐘道 (Yue Chinese)
- Length: 600 metres (2,000 ft)
- Location: Admiralty, Hong Kong
- Coordinates: 22.2789°N 114.1645°E

Queensway
- Traditional Chinese: 金鐘道
- Simplified Chinese: 金钟道
- Literal meaning: Golden Bell (Admiralty) Road
Transcriptions
Standard Mandarin
- Hanyu Pinyin: Jīnzhōng Dào
Yue: Cantonese
- Yale Romanization: Gām jūng douh
- Jyutping: Gam1 zung1 dou6
- IPA: [kɐ́m tsʊ́ŋ tòu]

Queensway (Chinese: 金鐘道; Jyutping: gam1 zung1 dou6) is a major road in the Admiralty area of Central, Hong Kong. It was originally a section of Queen's Road East, and forms part of the continuum of Queen's Road which had been split into Queen's Road West, Queen's Road Central, Queensway, and Queen's Road East after World War II. At its western end it splits into Queen's Road Central and Des Voeux Road Central, whilst at its eastern end it merges into Hennessy Road, at the junction with Queen's Road East.

== Name ==
Queensway was formally separated and given its own name when the extensive military and naval sites that dominated this area were redeveloped around the 1960s. Its Chinese name can be translated as Golden Bell Road – a reference to a notable bell once located in the adjacent Admiralty Dock, and does not include the word 'Queen'.

The road is one of only a handful in the territory to have a name consisting of a single word. Other examples are Glenealy (Central), Smithfield (Kennedy Town) and Broadway (Lai Chi Kok). As a result, the road is often mistakenly referred to as Queensway Road.

== Important buildings ==
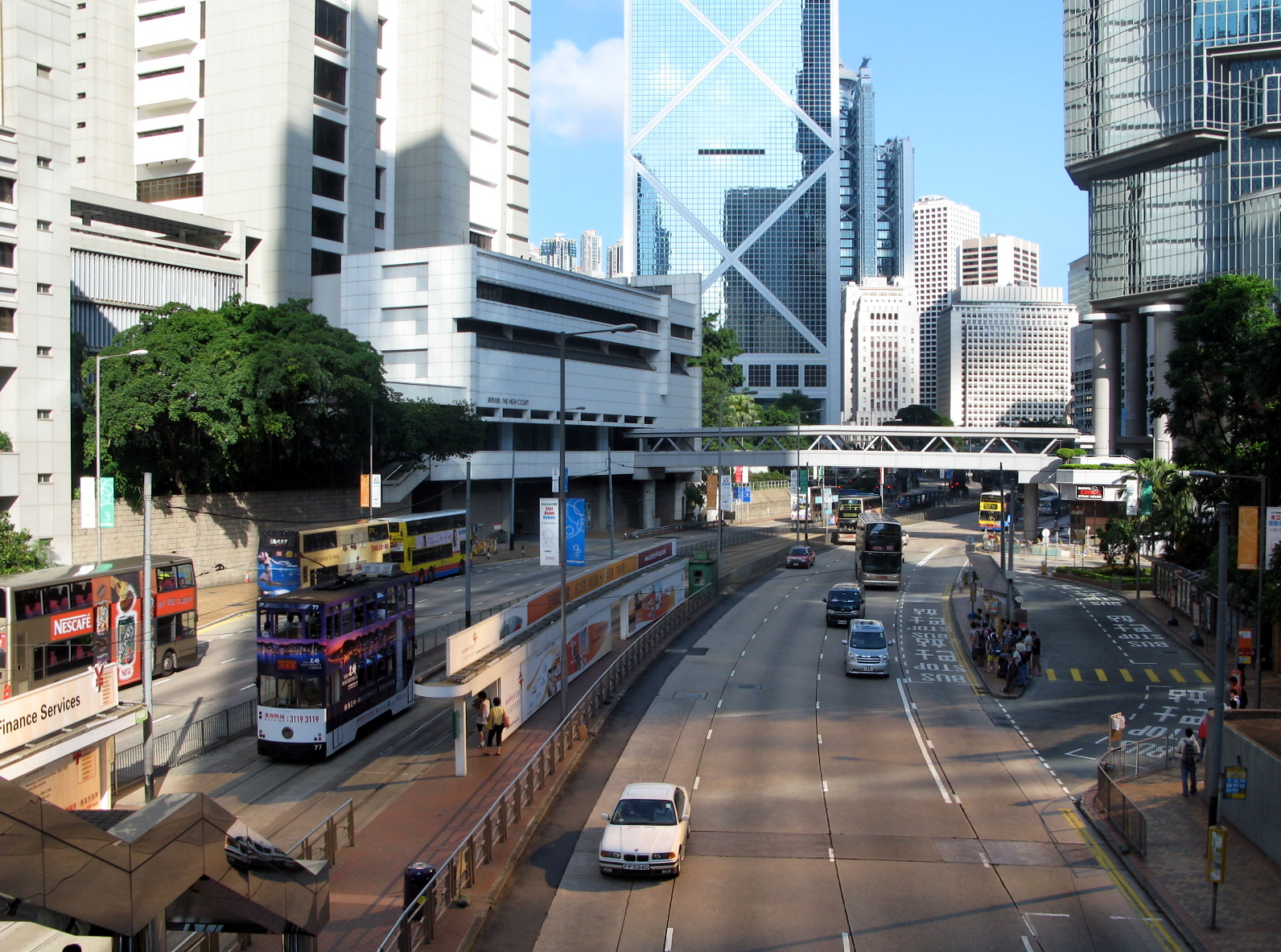
A view of Queensway in August 2009; facing its west-end; from the skyway connecting Pacific Place with Queensway Plaza. The Government Offices, Hong Kong Park, The Bank of China and Lippo Centre can be seen in the vicinity.

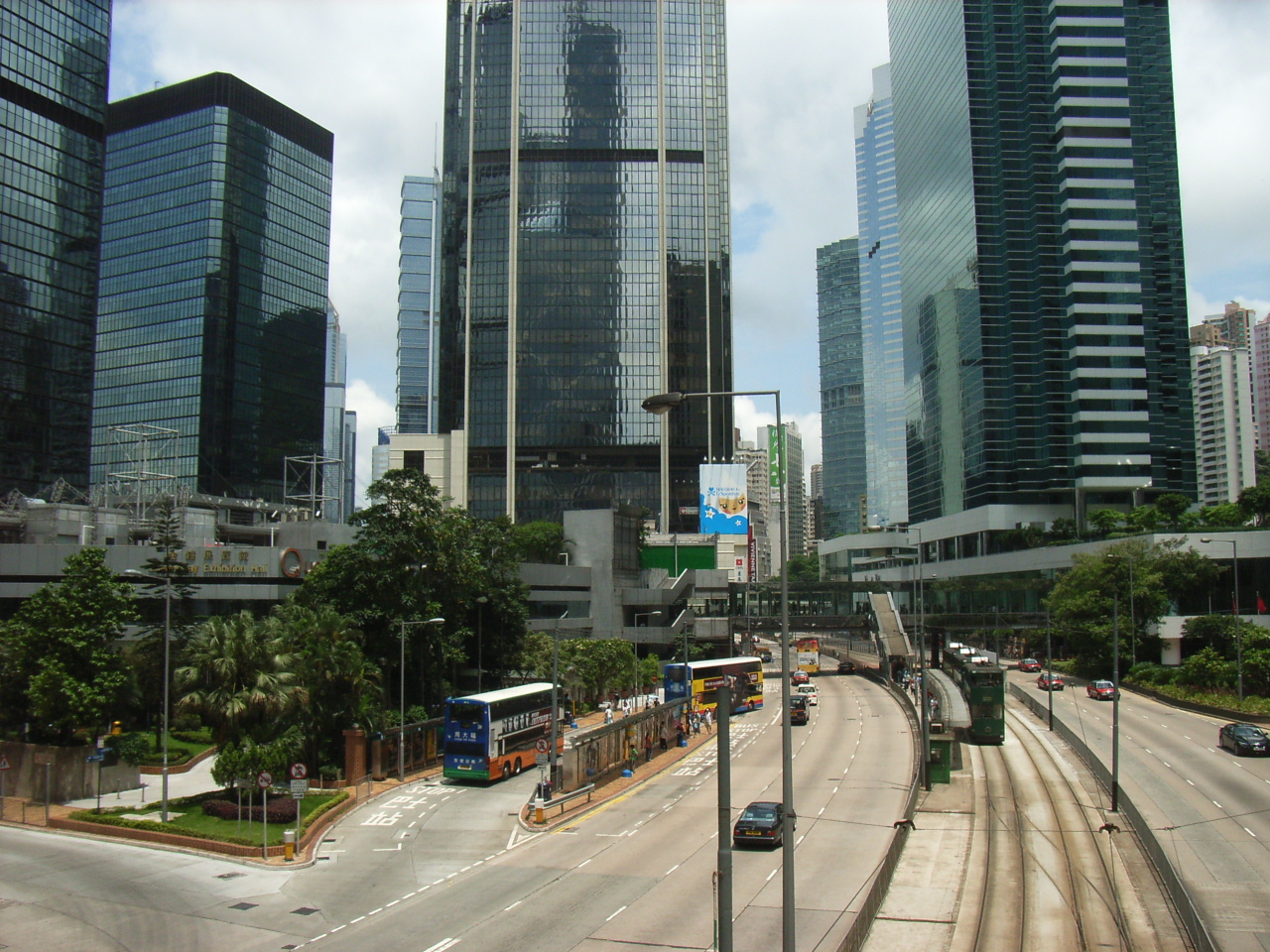
Commercial buildings in Queensway in May 2006. View is eastward; the one-storey Queensway Plaza is on the left, displaying the large "Q" logo. In the centre above the Plaza is the United Centre. On the right is the Pacific Place mall, topped by, from closest: Swire offices, the JW Marriott Hotel and 3 Pacific Place (not on Queensway). In the centre, a Skyway links the two malls with the tram lines running underneath.

The road is home to a large amount of landmarks, with its northbound lane housing such notable buildings as the Cheung Kong Centre; Bank of China Tower; Hong Kong Park (including Flagstaff House and the Museum of Tea Ware); Queensway Government Offices; the High Court; and the Swire-owned Pacific Place, a shopping centre and office tower complex incorporating the Conrad, Island Shangri-La and Marriott hotels. Landmarks located along the southbound lane include: Chater Garden, which is the former site of Hong Kong's main cricket ground; the Lippo Centre; Queensway Plaza – a one-storey shopping mall next to the United Centre office block which is also linked to Pacific Place opposite by means of a fully enclosed skywalk; the small Harcourt Garden; and (at the Wan Chai end) the Hong Kong Police Headquarters.

== Military history ==
Until the 1980s, both sides of the road were British military sites. To its south were Wellington Barracks, Murray Barracks and Victoria Barracks, whilst to the north lay the Admiralty Dock. Flagstaff House was the residence of the Commander British Forces of Hong Kong between 1842 and 1978. These were gradually replaced as the Central district expanded.

== Layout ==
When it was initially laid, the road wasn't as straight as at present. Two close bends in the midsection (between Rodney Block and Naval Terrace – neither of which exists today) formed an S-shape, known as the death bend of Queensway (金鐘道死亡彎角) as it was the site of frequent traffic accidents, especially between vehicles and trams. Straightening of the road was planned from as early as 1968 and finally carried out in 1974 with the official completion taking place on 12 January 1975.

Present-day Queensway is much wider than it used be. Its carriageways are separated by the lines of the famous Hong Kong trams. At no point along its length are pedestrians allowed to cross the road at ground level. Instead, there are a number of footbridges which also provide access to the tramway stop islands.

== Events ==
Although it is a major road, Queensway is part of the route regularly taken by marches and protests including the annual July 1 marches. As part of the 2014 Hong Kong protests in Admiralty, protesters occupied all traffic lanes of Queensway beginning 26 September 2014. The protesters set up barricades to block vehicle access. The Hong Kong police removed these barricades, and the road was re-opened to traffic in the afternoon of 14 October 2014.

== See also ==
- List of streets and roads in Hong Kong
- Murray House, in Stanley, which was originally located along the road, before being moved.
