= Timeline of the 2019–2020 Hong Kong protests (June 2020) =

June events of the 2019–2020 pro-democracy demonstrations in Hong Kong

Timeline of the 2019–2020 Hong Kong protests
2019			March–June				July	August	September	October	November	December
2020	January	February	March	April	May	June	July	August	September	October	November	December
2021	January	February	March	April	May	June	July	August	September–November			December

The month of June 2020 was the first anniversary of the 2019–2020 Hong Kong protests. The decision taken by the National People's Congress on national security legislation and the alleviation of the COVID-19 pandemic in Hong Kong led to a new series of protests and international responses. On 30 June, the Standing Committee of the National People's Congress passed the Hong Kong national security law which came into force the same day, leading to even more people protesting on 1 July.

== Events ==
=== 1 June ===
A petition in support of Beijing's plan to implement national security legislation was published online, which claimed to have been signed by over 2,500 actors, artists, and individuals from the entertainment and cultural industry in Hong Kong. The petition contained the name of veteran actor Ram Chiang, but Chiang later stated in his Facebook page that he did not sign the petition. It was reported that Barbie Hsu had also denied receiving an invitation or notification to join the petition.

The petition also consisted of late artists such as Anita Mui and Leslie Cheung, with several netizens believing that the petition consisted of fake signatures. Sharon Cheung, a news broadcaster, clarified that she never did sign the petition.

A restaurant in Ngau Tau Kok, which was supportive of the protests and youngsters, received a letter from the Hong Kong Housing Authority that the contract was no longer renewed and the eatery would shut down on 30 November 2020, despite the restaurant fulfilling social responsibility by giving out free lunchboxes to the elderly. Employees of the restaurant criticized the authority's decision, calling it a suppression of the Yellow Economic Circle. After learning that the contract was to be terminated through information from the Internet, citizens queued up to support them.

In a press interview in the Legislative Council, Financial Secretary Paul Chan Mo-po was seen with tears in his eyes, stirring controversy and discussion among social media on whether he was scared of the United States restrictions on Hong Kong. Chan later clarified in a Facebook post that the tears were due to the camera lighting during the interview, calling it a "misunderstanding".

The annual Tiananmen Square massacre vigil in Hong Kong was banned for the first time since 1990 citing health concerns due to COVID-19. Lee Cheuk Yan, the chairman of the Hong Kong Alliance in Support of Patriotic Democratic Movements of China, which organized the vigil in the past years, said that the ban signaled the end of Hong Kong's "one country, two systems".

=== 2 June ===
==== United Kingdom response ====
United Kingdom Foreign Minister Dominic Raab addressed the Parliament with a statement which said that the imposition of national security legislation on Hong Kong by the Chinese central government would be in direct conflict with Article 23 of the Hong Kong Basic Law, as well as a violation of international law. He outlined the UK's possible response to support the Hong Kong people through providing a pathway to citizenship for British National Overseas-passport holders in Hong Kong.

==== Progress of court cases related to anti-extradition protests ====
A student, Lam Tsz-Ho, accused of rioting in Wong Tai Sin on 1 October was acquitted by judge Sham Siu-Man. The judge criticized the two police officers facilitating the accusations that they had not proven they had caught the person who had hurled a brick; and that the Court could not accept their affidavits. He went on to say that at least one of the two officers had failed to provide a full and truthful account of how Lam had sustained a head wound during his arrest.

The protester shot by a police officer in the 11 November shooting incident went on trial. The judge, Law Tak-Chuen, allowed the police officer who fired the shot to remain anonymous, stating that he had received death threats.

==== Other developments ====
Local activist group Demosisto urged the United Nations to discuss the National Security Law, and to advise the mainland government not to implement it. In a nine-page report filed on 2 June the group argued that the definition of 'National Security' was unclear and vague, and stressed that the law would allow those critical of the Chinese Communist Party to face potential arrest. They worried that slogans which have been familiar in the protests would be banned, and that there would be frequent abuse of power and rights from the top authorities. They also added that Hong Kong's freedom and autonomy would encounter a 'fatal' blow. In addition to the emerging threat, the report also complained about alleged police brutality and prison abuses.

In a South China Morning Post commentary, Andrew Li, former Chief Justice of the Court of Final Appeal of Hong Kong, stated that it was reasonable for the mainland government to take steps towards enacting a security law, given that the Hong Kong government had failed to discharge its constitutional duty as required by Hong Kong Basic Law Article 23. He wrote that in his understanding, the proposed legislation would be "designed to fit Hong Kong's legal system" and especially must not be retroactive (to previous offenses).

In addition, Yang Ti-liang, former Chief Justice of the Supreme Court of Hong Kong, issued a statement, expressing that he felt assured that the national security law would be in line with common law principles, and that it was "understandable and justifiable" to have such a law.

Prior to embarking on a trip to Beijing to discuss matters on National People's Congress Decision on Hong Kong national security legislation, Chief Executive Carrie Lam told reporters, referencing the protests that had recently erupted in the United States in connection with the murder of George Floyd, that the United States was applying "double standards" in its response to violence that had occurred during the Hong Kong protests.

In a report entitled 'New Law, New Threat', Human Rights First warned that the looming national security law would endanger human rights lawyers in Hong Kong to a further degree than what had already been the case.

=== 3 June ===
==== United Kingdom response ====
Prime Minister Boris Johnson announced in an opinion piece written for South China Morning Post that if China were to continue pursuing the national security law, he would allow all Hong Kong residents born before the 1997 handover to claim a British National (Overseas) passport (BNO) and open a path to British citizenship for them. Raab said that the UK would sacrifice trade deals with China to support Hong Kong, but that presently it will remain in conversation with the international community on the matter. A late-May statement by Raab had offered a similar measure that would allow the 300,000 current BNO passport holders to apply for a visa; Johnson's 3 June announcement would cover a further 2.5 million Hong Kong residents born before the 1997 handover. China's foreign ministry spokesman Zhao Lijian threatened "serious consequences", while many Hong Kong pro-democratic politicians and protesters were reported to wish for more protection for their city itself.

==== Other international responses ====
The internet platform of state-run Xinhua News Agency published a list of "many" countries that had announced their support for the National Security Law, and moreover had aligned with the central government's view that Hong Kong's affairs were an internal matter of China: Burundi, Myanmar, North Korea, the Philippines, Sri Lanka, Syria, Tanzania, and Uganda. Previously on 1 June, the global edition of state-run China Daily published an article that mentioned the support of "various" countries for China's position regarding Hong Kong, naming Serbia, North Korea, Pakistan, Cuba, Russia, and Iran.

==== Other developments ====
Some protesters and citizens gathered outside the Lai Chi Kok Reception Centre to mourn the 1989 Tiananmen Square protests and massacre, as well as to show solidarity with those who were detained for their actions in the current protests in Hong Kong.

In an article for the Bauhinia Magazine, Pro-China politician Tam Yiu-chung stated that those members of the legislative council who disapproved of the national security law should be disqualified. Members of the pro-democracy camp sharply criticized Tam's statements.

Demosisto started a petition to fight for European state leaders to support Hong Kong citizens. There have been 70,000 signatures already out of the 100,000 goal.

=== 4 June ===
At the United States Department of State, Secretary of State Mike Pompeo met surviving activists of the 1989 Tiananmen Square Protests. The State Department offered no details on what was discussed but said in a statement: "We mourn the victims of June 4, 1989, and we stand with the people of China who continue to aspire to a government that protects human rights, fundamental freedoms and basic human dignity."

4 June 2020 was the 31st anniversary of the 1989 Tiananmen Square massacre. The official gathering at Victoria Park was banned by police on 1 June, the first time in 30 years citing COVID-19 concerns. Although the official candlelight vigil was banned, multiple activities were planned to mourn in different districts such as Victoria Park, Shatin, Tuen Mun, Tsuen Wan. At around 5:00 pm, pro-democracy protesters handed out flyers outside Sogo in Causeway Bay, shouting slogans, and peacefully entering Victoria Park as groups of eight. The police used a broadcaster to warn citizens not to participate in unlawful assembly. Police stood on standby but did not prevent protesters inside the park grounds. Peaceful protesters lit candles or turned on their phone lights. In addition, Avenue of Stars, Shing Mun River in Shatin, Tuen Mun Park, Sai Ying Pun Station, Kwun Tong Promenade and Langham Place all featured events. Attendees held umbrellas with slogans, and formed chains by holding hands together. 3500 police officers were stationed at various checkpoints. At around 9:00 pm, several people blocked roads near Langham Place in Mong Kok. The police stated that they were using traffic cones and fences to block multiple streets. People were arrested by the police who sprayed pepper spray. After the event, the pro-Beijing camp accused Lee Cheuk-yan of encouraging unlawful assembly and unlawful behaviour. Pro-Beijing citizens further urged the Hong Kong Police Force to arrest Lee Cheuk-yan and Jimmy Lai for participating in unlawful assembly, and alleged that the two had disobeyed social distancing measures during the vigil.

On 4 June 2020, the National Anthem Bill passed its third reading, with 41 legislators in favor of it and 1 against. 41 out of 42 pro-establishment legislators voted in favor of it, except the chairperson Andrew Leung who abstained. 1 out of 23 pan-democracy legislators voted against it, with the others abstaining, in protest. Before the voting, pan-democracy legislators Raymond Chan and Eddie Chu splashed a jar of reeking liquid in front of the rostrum in protest, accusing Andrew Leung of being a “rubber stamp” and that what he did will “reek for ten thousand years”.

=== 5 June ===
==== International response: USA ====
In accordance to the restrictions and sanctions placed on China and Hong Kong by the United States, Republican senator Pat Toomey urged the United States government to implement the sanctions as soon as possible. In a meeting, he stated that both Republicans and Democrats hoped to implement the restrictions quickly, so as to sanction those Chinese authorities and bank officials from spoiling Hong Kong's original autonomy. In a joint statement with Democrat Chris Van Hollen, he argued that those authorities responsible for implementing the National Security Law should have their assets frozen.

==== International response: Russia ====
Director of the Information and Press Department of the Ministry of Foreign Affairs of the Russian Federation Maria Zakharova stated that Russia treated the national security law as 'internal affairs' of China, and Britain and the United States should not interfere. In a press conference on 5 June, China Foreign Ministry spokesman Geng Shuang stated that China appreciated Russia's stance. He also expressed that this facilitated the friendly relationship between China and Russia, and that it was well-received within the international community.

==== International response: UK ====
After HSBC backed the national security law proposed by Beijing in a petition, Alistair Carmichael, chairman of the U.K. parliamentary group on Hong Kong, referred to the petition signed by the London-based bank's top executive in Asia, Peter Wong, in support of a move that critics say will diminish the city's freedom and autonomy. The British government is opposing the proposed law, with Prime Minister Boris Johnson saying he will give as many as three million residents of his nation's former colony the chance to seek refuge in the U.K. if China presses ahead. Member of Parliament Jacob Rees-Mogg criticized the bank of being pro-China instead of being pro-Britain, even though it was funded by the British. He publicly requested the bank to stop supporting the national security law. Former Governor of Hong Kong Chris Patten criticized China for exerting pressure on foreign companies through the threat of withholding business opportunities. He advised the United States to unite with other democratic countries to counter "underhanded tactics" by Beijing.

==== Private prosecution brought against taxi driver who rammed into a crowd ====
Pro-democracy legislator Ted Hui accused a taxi driver of driving towards a crowd during a protest in a private prosecution. It was the first private prosecution case which was allowed by the Court since the start of the large-scale protests in June 2019. Hui had initiated the proceedings in February 2020 after the Department of Justice had taken no legal action. Hui stated that this case could uphold justice to the victims of the car crash.

==== Progress of public prosecutions related to arrestees at anti-extradition protests ====
A Hong Kong Institute of Vocational Education student accused of owning a petrol bomb was sentenced to one year in jail.

Another case which had gained notable attention in Hong Kong has begun on 11 May. Tong Wai-hung and To Yee-lan were arrested and charged of rioting in Sheung Wan on 28 July 2019 and had pleaded not guilty. In court today they claimed that the police officer who has arrested them had not given them a police caution warning. When asked by the defense, she stated that she had forgiven all the formal procedures she had learnt in the Police Academy.

==== Other developments ====
In an editorial published by Ta Kung Pao, a pro-China newspaper, pro-China commentator Wut Wing-yin voiced out support for the national security law. She stated that the Chinese Communist Party has granted Hong Kong 23 years of autonomy and freedom since the handover in 1997, yet the 'resistance' has retaliated with disobedience, rioting and damage. The national security law would be used to tackle those who intend to commit illegal crimes and participate in 'riots'. She advised general citizens of Hong Kong not to worry about its implications. She criticized the pro-democracy party of "instilling fear," generating negative attitudes and reviews towards the law.

According to information published on a Hong Kong government website, the Home Affairs Bureau said that the plan of 17 District Councils to hold a Joint Special Meeting on 6 June to discuss the National People's Congress decision on national security legislation was a violation of the District Councils Ordinance, which limited the functions of the District Councils to district related affairs. Later on 9 June, Kowloon City District Council Vice-chair Kwong Po-yin rejected this criticism by saying that the Councillors had a "duty" to voice the concerns of citizens about the impact of the national security law on future generations "to the SAR government, the Chinese government and the world".

Luo Huining, Director of the Liaison Office of the Central People's Government in Hong Kong, insisted that the law should be dealt strictly so as to 'protect the legal rights and freedom of the majority of Hong Kong citizens'.

Patrick Nip, Secretary for the Civil Service visited the Police Headquarters. Among the purposes of his visit was to meet those who had been injured in the protest movement over the past year. Nip stated that the national security law was the crucial step for One Country, Two Systems to succeed. Two days later in a press interview he urged civil servants working for the government to support the national security law. He said, while dealing with national security issues, there should only be the concept of 'one country', and not 'two systems'. In addition, he expressed that the sense of identity was not strong among civil servants. He agreed that there should be enhanced communication with the Greater Bay Area and to develop programs to enhance the sense of identity among civil servants.

=== 6 June ===
In a 1.5 hour phone call with China's paramount leader Xi Jinping, President of France Emmanuel Macron expressed that he supported the 'One China, Two Systems' concept that China uses to govern Hong Kong. He stated that France was closely following the situation in Hong Kong.

Jeremy Tam, pro-democracy member of the Legislative Council, reported that he was followed by an unknown man speaking Cantonese with Chinese accents after leaving the Legislative Council in Wan Chai. They reportedly took pictures of him and followed him. When asked about his identity, the unknown man denied that he was a police officer. When Tam insisted on calling the police, the man suddenly ran towards the opposite direction. Tam stated that he has been followed since late May and has filed a police report. Tam expressed that 'Hong Kong has not been a totally safe place' after such incidents. He also claimed that if they were Chinese police, they could have abducted him on a car. Fellow pro-democracy Legislative Council member Alvin Yeung stated that society has been instilled with fear and terror. It has troubled politicians, social activists as well as commoners. Pro-democracy political party Hong Kong Civic Party executive member Cheng Tat-hung, also a member of the Eastern District Council, issued an official statement calling this incident 'totally unacceptable', and that it should be condemned.

At a press conference, Lee Cheuk-yan, pro-democracy member of the Hong Kong Alliance in Support of Patriotic Democratic Movements of China, called for fundraising events for a virtual '4 June Museum of Memory and Human Rights', to permanently preserve historical archives and relics of victims of the protests on Tiananmen Square protests of 1989. Lee stressed the urgency to start such a project in view of the impending national security law and possible suppression of the Alliance's activities.

Pro-China activist Man Shek and 2 other pro-China activists went to the British Council to protest against Dominic Raab's policies towards Hong Kong. They presented a joint statement and held the Chinese flag. In addition, they ripped and destroyed their BNOs and criticized the British government of failing to consult Hong Kong citizens before introducing policies relating to the national security law.

In a meeting with pro-Beijing political group Democratic Alliance for the Betterment and Progress of Hong Kong on June 6, Commissioner of Police Chris Tang blamed the pro-democracy protests for the increase in robberies in the past year. The statistics he mentioned included 1) "crime rate" of 10-15 year-olds increased by about 80%, and 2) that of 16-20 year-olds increased by 120% from the year before. He also stated that last year over 4900 youths were arrested. He criticized netizens of encouraging citizens to participate in unlawful assembly, which also defied social distancing measures. It is worth noting that the number of arrests is different from number of convictions, as Hong Kong's legal system presumed one's innocence before proven guilty.

Hong Kong government has spent millions of tax-payers money to denounce the year-long pro-democracy movement and is intended to increase public relation budget in 2020-2021 budget by about 20%, according to a budget proposal sent to the Legislative Council. For example, a 30-second advertisement produced by the Hong Kong Government warning citizens not to participate in illegal activities and violence cost HK$499,000 to produce. While some newspapers criticized the government of wasting public resources, others believed that the government should spend more.

Secretary of Education Kevin Yeung stated that if students and teachers insulted the national anthem, schools could call the police.

=== 7 June ===
In an interview broadcast in the TVB news programme On the Record, pro-democracy veteran Martin Lee expressed his view that the only legislative body legally allowed to pass any laws and legislation in Hong Kong was the Hong Kong Legislative Council (LegCo). He considered the central government's bypassing of the LegCo in spite of having a majority in it, and directly mandating the security law, as a breach of the Hong Kong Basic Law.

=== 9 June ===
Japan, part of G7, expressed its concern over Hong Kong protests and arrests.

A year ago over a million Hong Kong citizens took to the street protesting against the Hong Kong government's refusal to yield to citizens' demand to scrap the pro-Beijing extradition law.

One year later Carrie Lam said in a press conference that "everyone has to learn a lesson. The SAR government has to learn a lesson, I hope each and every lawmaker will learn a lesson too."

The one-year anniversary memorials were characterized by grassroots, flash-mob pro-democracy events "Lunch With You", a type of protest that had been repeatedly seen over the past months. The rallies of that day took place in Wai Chai, Central, Tai Koo, San Po Kong, Kwai Chung, Kwun Tong, and Kowloon Bay. Hundreds of peaceful protesters, students and elders included, showed up with signs and sang the protest anthem "Glory to Hong Kong".

In all, police claimed that they made 53 arrests.

=== 10 June ===
Reporters Without Borders (RSF) urged the Hong Kong government to drop the "riot" charge against the two journalists who were at the scene on 1 July 2019 covering the protest inside Hong Kong Legislative Council building. The two journalists were charged on 10 June 2020, almost a whole year after the live news coverage. RSF's East Asia bureau head Cédric Alviani asked the Hong Kong Secretary for Justice to "immediately drop the absurd rioting charge.”

One prominent policy proposed by the national security law was to enforce supervision and monitoring of schools and schoolchildren. Previously wrote about the danger of silencing schoolchildren and "brainwashing" them using fear of the new national security law in a Stand News article, today in an interview with NowTV, Ip Kin-yuen, pro-democracy member of the legislative council representing the education sector, continued to stress that the government, by supporting the law, was attempting to stop students from voicing out support for the movement. He said that schools were starting to have follow-up actions regarding students who participated in social movements such as 'Sing with You' and slogan-calling.

Hong Kong's Secretary of Security Lee stated in an exclusive interview with South China Morning Post that Hong Kong Police is ready to enforce the not-yet-enacted National Security Law. At the time of the interview, the draft of the law had not been made public.

=== 11 June ===
==== Six-Monthly Report on Hong Kong ====
The UK released its regular Six-Monthly Report on Hong Kong documenting situations in Hong Kong from 1 July to 31 December 2019. When presenting this report British's foreign minister Dominic Raab stressed that the resolution to the Hong Kong pro-democracy protest must be done from within (the legislative procedures of) Hong Kong, and cannot be imposed by mainland China. He urged China to reconsider.

==== International response: Germany ====
In a phone call to Chinese Prime Minister Li Keqiang, Angela Merkel discussed the situation in Hong Kong along with other economic and business topics. The foreign policy expert for Merkel's conservatives, Roderich Kiesewetter, urged China to respect Hong Kong's autonomous status.

==== Progress of court cases ====
Four pro-democracy leaders, Jimmy Lai, Lee Cheuk-yan, Richard Tsoi, Albert Ho and 9 others were charged for inciting others to defy a police ban and gather in Victoria Park on 4 June. They received a call from police, informing them of the court summons. The alliance has been organising the vigil for 30 years, but the police issued an objection letter to the event this year, citing the prohibition on group gatherings of more than eight amid the COVID-19 pandemic.

A taxi-driver who drove his taxi and attempted to ram into crowds of protesters in October last year resulting in multiple injuries had still not been arrested or prosecuted by the police. As a result, pro-democracy politician Ted Hui has filed a private prosecution against the taxi-driver and has been approved by the court.

==== Other developments ====
Secretary for Education Kevin Yeung issued a statement to all the principals of schools and education institutions of Hong Kong. He stated that, the bureau opposes any form of class boycotts as it was considered a case of poor discipline. The board would closely follow-up if any schools violated this principle. He stated that, the anthem of the protest, "Glory to Hong Kong", was "clearly propaganda" and that it should be banned in schools. However, those which were related to the Basic Law would not be considered with political influence, as it was part of 'moral education' for students. Yeung stated that another popular song in the protests, "Do You Hear the People Sing?" from the musical Les Misérables, would be allowed in principle, but that the situation and intent would be taken into account. Teachers would be provided with material for teaching the security law, as well as accompanying training in how to use it.

At a media session, Secretary for Security John Lee stated that the Hong Kong government would begin explaining the national security law once it was promulgated. He expressed confidence that the Hong Kong police would be quickly able to develop their skills and experience to discharge their function effectively. He said that police did have some prior experience in security matters, in particular through its actions against one Hong Kong independence society.

The videoconferencing platform Zoom admitted that it had shut down the accounts of Hong Kong-based human rights activist Lee Cheuk-yan and US-based activist Zhou Fengsuo, and twice shut down a Zoom event hosted by US-based activist Wang Dan, under pressure from the mainland government. The relevant Zoom meetings of the three human rights activists had been about the preparation of the anniversary and, in the case of Wang, the commemoration of the 1989 Tiananmen Square protests and massacre, in which Zhou and Wang had taken part. In a statement, Zoom said that it would create ways to block, if requested to do so by authorities, participants of Zoom calls who are based in mainland China, but would not allow to let such requests affect participants from outside China where the same activity is legal.

=== 12 June ===
The day marked the one year anniversary of occupying LegCo in Admiralty that successfully stopped the second reading of the Fugitive Offenders amendment bill. Hong Kong citizens, in this one year memorial, continued to come out in droves to show solidarity against the government and demand the riot charge to be removed in addition to denouncing police brutality. The original mass protest plan was scrapped as police, using the pandemic as a reason, declined to grant a "letter of no objection" (LONO). In addition, police declared that there would be heavy armed forces in Central to prevent any citizens from unlawful gatherings. As a result, the mass protest turned into a more localized commemorative event throughout Hong Kong. Rallies and gatherings occurred in Causeway Bay, Mong Kok, Tsim Sha Tsui, Sha Tin, Yuen Long, Tuen Mun, and Tsuen Wan. Throughout the day, police detained dozens of pro-democracy protesters as crowds gathered to mark the anniversary of the start of the protests. and by the end of the day, police claimed that 43 individuals were arrested in Causeway Bay and Mong Kok, allegedly charged with unlawful gathering, among them several district representatives that had been elected in November 2019. One noticeable event was a pro-Beijing politician Kwong Sing-yu, who was arrested for wounding and attacking chanting citizens and an Epoch Times journalist in Kwun Tong.

Secretary for Security John Lee stated that police officers would be given the authority to enforce the national security law as soon as possible after its implementation in Hong Kong.

On the anniversary of 12/6, protest activities sprung out all across Hong Kong. Riot police was on standby at different districts and conducted stop and searches of pedestrians. Ted Hui, pro-democracy activist, was arrested due to unlawful assembly. Hundreds of students from Heung To Middle School in Kowloon Tong formed a human chain around the school in support of the school's music teacher. The teacher's contract was not renewed allegedly due to his failure to prevent his students from performing Glory to Hong Kong in a music test.

At night, a riot police officer shouted, in what seemed to be mockery of the United States over the George Floyd protests and police brutality, slogans such as Black Lives Matter, I can't breathe towards the camera of a foreign journalist at the protest site. The video went viral after 'BeWater HK' uploaded it on Facebook. Pro-democracy politicians condemned the conduct and actions of the police as 'unprofessional, unethical' and that their attitude was generally poor and disrespectful. According to the police, the police officer concerned was reprimanded for unprofessional conduct.

=== 14 June ===
Legal scholar Johannes Chan of the University of Hong Kong said that the proposed security legislation had to be set out in detail, to avoid it being used to stifle dissent, and that waving flags and chanting slogans should not be prohibited under the law as these activities did not amount to "action". He said it was "highly undesirable" that, unlike in Hong Kong, laws were drafted in China in a "rather vague manner and general manner", leaving it to the government to fill it with content.

Placed late at night on Beacon Hill top and seen in the early morning of June 15, a 25-meter vertical protest banner with black fabric and white font criticized the state of Hong Kong as "One Country One System Hong Kong Game Over" (「一國一制香港玩完」).

=== 15 June ===
==== One-year memorial vigil for Marco Leung ====
One year ago on this day, Chief Executive Carrie Lam had declared that the anti-extradition law would be indefinitely suspended. The day also marked the one-year anniversary of the suicide of Marco Leung Ling-kit, which was linked to the anti-extradition protest; at the time of his fatal fall, Leung had worn a yellow raincoat with words written on the back that were seen as protest against Lam's decision not to withdraw the bill completely. Tens of thousands of Hong Kong citizens gathered in Admiralty to pay tribute and respect to the first death since the protest began. Hundreds more people gathered locally in Tuen Mun, Causeway Bay, and Tin Shui Wai. The crowd laid flowers and paid their tributes to Leung. Riot officers stopped and searched some people clad in black and a man dressed in a yellow raincoat.

==== Hong Kong protest art wins Prix Ars Electronica ====
Over the year, there have been thousands of various arts, flyers, stickers, and slogans in various forms such as songs, memes, posters, created by thousands of Hong Kong citizens, young and old, supporting the pro-democracy protest in Hong Kong. Everyone of them, as credited by the editors as "all Hong Kong protesters involved in the struggle to safeguard democracy", is the winner of this year's Prix Ars Electronica 2020's "Golden Nica" award in the "Digital Communities" category. Termed the "Oscar" and the "World's Most Time-Honored" of media arts, Ars Electronica Festival has been celebrating and recognizing media art since 1987. The title of the winning submission is called "Be Water by Hong Kongers", submitted by Eric Siu & Joel Kwong. In a Stand News interview, Eric and Joel emphasized that they are just the "messengers", sending Hong Kong talent and creativity to the world. They wanted Hong Kong people to know that the world is watching and supporting them regardless of the eventual end (of the protest).

==== International responses ====
In Vancouver, Canada, numerous Canadians wearing black shirts raised yellow umbrellas and held high 'HK' signs in a peaceful rally in support of Hong Kong protests. In Berlin, Germany, peaceful protesters brought flowers and a coffin draped with a black HK flag, signifying that freedom and autonomy of Hong Kong had died. They also raised a banner which stated 'Germany stands with Hong Kong'. In Halifax, Canada, protesters raised banners and signs showing 'Stand with Hong Kong' to voice out support for the movement.

In May, US House of Representatives' Republicans formed the 'China Task Force' which analyses and collects data and information from China that poses as a threat towards the US, from aspects such as national security, economy, technology, competitiveness and awareness. They also proposed a law to sanction and punish technology theft targeting the US. This week, in response to the escalating tension with China, US legislators proposed the "Creating Helpful Incentives to Produce Semiconductors (CHIPS) for America Act" that hope to fund more technology research and development and wane the Chinese dependency.

European Union parliament called for a "joint motion for a resolution" to defend Hong Kong's autonomy and freedom. There are 24 points on this motion ranging from demanding that "international community must work together closely to put pressure on Beijing to ensure that its actions are in line with the country's international commitments under the 1984 Sino-British Declaration" to the "commemoration of the Tiananmen massacre not only in Hong Kong, but also in the whole territory of the PRC".

==== Other developments ====
A survey by Breakthrough Limited interviewed Hong Kong citizens regarding their views about the protests. 75% of those interviewed stated that they felt sad and upset, and 95% said that they felt the pain and despair. 94% teenagers stated that they would contribute towards the betterment of Hong Kong. It reflected that teenagers, in general, had emotional problem relating to this matter. 70% of those interviewed stated that the cause of the protest was based on decreasing amounts of freedom, democracy and human rights.

Hong Kong and Macau Affairs Office deputy director Deng Zhonghua stated that under the proposed national security law, Beijing should retain jurisdiction under 'very special' circumstances. He said that, when national security has been severely threatened, the central government would always have the right to retain jurisdiction. He added that the arrangement would not undermine the independent judicial power and the final adjudication power of the SAR enshrined in the Basic Law.

=== 16 June ===
In a jointly issued letter, 86 international civil and social organizations made a representation to Chairman of the National People's Committee Li Zhanshu emphasizing the urgent need for China to preserve Hong Kong's freedom.

The day marked the one year anniversary of the record-breaking 2-million march opposing the extradition bill.

Chief Executive of Hong Kong Carrie Lam accused the opposition of 'demonizing' the national security law.

=== 17 June ===
==== International responses ====
A rare high-level talk between top Chinese diplomat Yang Jiechi and US Secretary of State Mike Pompeo took place in Hawaii on 17 June. A senior State Department official said before the session, which lasted for seven hours and covered a wide range of topics, that Pompeo wanted to remind Beijing about its commitments to Hong Kong. Yang told his counterpart to "stop meddling in Hong Kong's affairs".

UK foreign secretary Dominic Raab condemned the HSBC for voicing out support for the national security law. He stated that the law would violate the Sino-British Joint Declaration and that it would diminish Hong Kong's status, freedom and autonomy. He urged Beijing to revoke the law.

In a statement released on 17 June, G7 countries condemned the national security law and urged Beijing to revoke the law. On 18 June, Chinese spokesman Zhao Lijian condemned these proposals, calling them an interference to the 'internal affairs' of China.

==== Other developments ====
Tam Yiu-chung, pro-Beijing politician, said that the CPC had never stated that all of the cases which would be related to the national security law would be held trial in Hong Kong; rather, extradition of the arrested to China for trial was possible. Pro-democracy activist Joshua Wong saw Tam's statements as the end of the 'One Country, Two Systems' framework and of judicial independence.

James Tien, member of a pro-Beijing party but claimed to be a "moderate", stated that most people in Hong Kong disapproved of the national security law, and that the Hong Kong government had not eased their minds by raising the possibility that it may not adhere to the principles of common law. He said that he nevertheless hoped that Hong Kongers would eventually accept the law.

After the protest movements, a lot of teachers were deterred to present their political opinions. According to a survey by Hong Kong Professional Teachers' Union, 80% of those teachers interviewed said that they were worried parents would make complaints based on political bias. 60% of them avoided participating in demonstrations and rallies. The union stressed that the personal freedom and rights of teachers had already diminished.

Education Bureau advised secondary schools to provide counselling towards students and schoolmates who had been arrested in the protest movement. The bureau stated that the school should provide follow-up measures and assistance so as to implement positive values in the mindsets of the schoolchildren so that they would not break the law again.

The private prosecution filed by pro-democracy politician Ted Hui to prosecute the police officer of shooting a protester in the 11/11 protests in Sai Wan Ho has begun and court date has been set to August 31. Kwan Kar-wing, a police officer, raised a handgun and fired shots towards an unarmed protester at a Sai Wan Ho junction. This incident marked the second event in the Protest movement involving protesters shot by police. Responding to this first case of private prosecution by citizen against police (and police brutality), Secretary for Justice Teresa Cheng said that it is her duty to intervene and stop private prosecutions that run against public interest or those brought by improper motives.

The 32nd annual IMD World Competitiveness (2020) report was released on June 17. Amid year-long citizen protests and dissatisfaction of Hong Kong government, Hong Kong's competitiveness rank fifth, falling from second place last year. According to Hong Kong's ICAC website, one ranking criterion worth noting is that Hong Kong's "bribery and corruption" within the "Government Efficiency" category is ranked 12th.

A 30-meter black-with-white font vertical protest banner written in English "HK Can't Breathe" was found on Beacon Hill. This phrase alluded to the murder of George Floyd in the United States that caused a months-long protest against police brutality in the US but is used here to mirror similar police tactics used on protesters.

=== 18 June ===
UK condemned China's decision to propose the national security law. Politicians urged the Chinese government to respect the judiciary, human rights and organisations in Hong Kong, and to ensure the high level of autonomy and freedom of Hong Kong. However, China retaliated, saying that the UK has been interfering and meddling in internal affairs in China, and that the national security law was proposed in order to uphold national security and to fix the loopholes in the existing system.

=== 19 June ===
==== International responses ====
The European Parliament voted regarding matters of the National Security Law. In the voting session, 565 voted 'for' bringing the CPC to the International Criminal Court in The Hague, while 34 voted 'against'. Members stated that the law would diminish Hong Kong's autonomy, rule of law and freedom. Some members also urged the EU to sanction respective Chinese officials in accordance to their responsibilities over the security law.

US Secretary of State Mike Pompeo said that he would be 'closely monitoring' the 2020 Legislative Council Election in Hong Kong as he participated in the Virtual Copenhagen Democracy Summit. He said that the US was making impending decisions on further consequences and legal responsibilities to those who intended to diminish Hong Kong's freedom.

President of Taiwan Tsai Ing-wen voiced out support towards Hong Kong protesters. She stated that Taiwan would continue providing humanitarian assistance towards those who are in need of help.

The United Nations High Commissioner for Human Rights Michelle Bachelet stressed that UN will closely monitor China's National Security Law and its impact on Hong Kong's human rights. She stated that the law must be clear in scope and definition.

==== Other developments ====
State-run China Daily published statements made by past Chief Executive of the Hong Kong Monetary Authority Joseph Yam in a television interview aired on 19 June. Yam stated that the national security law for Hong Kong would not affect Hong Kong financial markets, citing as one reason the seven-day rally of the Hang Seng index in June. He stated that it would be a chance to finally end the "social unrest" in Hong Kong. In addition, he also expressed that the US restrictions towards Hong Kong would be ineffective.

As reported by the Standard, citing Xinhua News Agency as its source, the wording of one of the offences punishable under the security law had been changed in the most recent draft. In a resolution of the National People's Congress from 28 May, the final paragraph had made "activities of foreign and external forces to interfere in the affairs of the SAR" a punishable offence, while in Xinhua's report this was changed to "collusion with foreign or external forces to endanger national security." Tanya Chan, the convener of the pro-democratic camp, and Dennis Kwok expressed their concerns about the unclear limitations of the notion of 'collusion'. Kwok said that it was "ridiculous" if international business or academic exchanges could be regarded as criminal activities. He also said that the law was "really about silencing Hong Kong's opposition". Secretary of Justice Teresa Cheng refused to comment on the wording of the law as it had not been finalized, but said that everyone should "have peace of mind" as the law intended to "safeguard the long-term stability of Hong Kong as well as Hongkongers' legitimate rights".

About 80 pupils of renowned local school Ying Wa College staged a peaceful assembly to pay their condolences to Marco Leung Ling-kit, who had committed suicide as a means of protest in June 2019 by falling from scaffolding. Some students sang the protest anthem, Glory to Hong Kong. The school promptly issued a statement to express that the school authority did not agree with the actions of the students. In the statement, the school said students were not allowed to organise human chain activities, to shout slogans or to sing songs with political influence. If similar actions were proposed again, there would be proper counselling and disciplinary actions. However, the Education Bureau expressed concerns that follow-up actions would be initiated.

Raymond Yeung, a teacher at Diocesan Girls' School who taught liberal studies had not had his contract renewed by the school after he got shot in the eye during protests last year. He said that his teaching career at the school would end at 31 August. He did not instantly disagree with the results, as he considered his eye injury would lead to his ability to correct assignments to decrease and to diminish his teaching quality which he expected. He agreed that his participation in the social movement would increase awareness by the media. For the time being, he would write books which is related to his personal accounts of the protest. He has taught at the school for 4 years.

=== 20 June ===
A poll organized by thirty labour unions including those representing public sector staff, aiming to call for a citywide work strike to halt the national security law legislation, failed as only 8,943 ballots were cast while 60,000 would have been needed. A class boycott for students would also not go ahead, due to failing to collect enough physical votes. Previously on 7 June, a government spokesperson had indirectly referred to the referendum as "meaningless activities" and that related efforts had, in part, been "intentionally misleading or inciting students".

=== 21 June ===
According to a statement of Tam Yiu-chung to media, legal consequences relating to the National Security Law would be approximately 3 years for minor incidents, 5 to 10 years for others, which was similar to Hong Kong's criminal law. He further said that it was unlikely that the new law would be applied retroactively.

==== International response: Japan ====
According to the Financial Times, Tokyo seeks to lure professional talent and business opportunities to boost Tokyo's competitiveness in East Asia. Japan could use this opportunity to make Tokyo a valid rival to Hong Kong as Hong Kong had been involved in protest incidents throughout the year. Japan is considering visa waivers, tax advice and free office space for asset managers, traders and bankers from Hong Kong in a campaign to cast Tokyo as the best exit strategy should a crisis force them out of the semi-autonomous territory.

=== 22 June ===
==== European Union response ====
In the EU-China Summit, European Union warned China that it considered the proposed security law to be a breach of Beijing's international commitments. European Commission president Ursula von der Leyen and European Council chief Charles Michel told Paramount leader Xi Jinping and Premier Li Keqiang of their "grave concern" over the new law.

==== Vertical protest banner unfurled on Lion Rock ====
A 30-meter black-with-white-font vertical protest banner found unfurled on Lion Rock called for Hong Kong citizens to "Fight Against Diabolical Law: Head To the Street On July 1" (「七一上街抗惡法」).

=== 23 June ===
==== European Union response ====
European Commission president Ursula von der Leyen and European Council chief Charles Michel expressed their "grave concern" over China's new national security law that will soon enacted in Hong Kong, which critics say will hurt Hong Kong's autonomy and freedoms.

==== Progress of court cases ====
Lau Ka-tung, a social worker who had blocked police from advancing in protests in Yuen Long that occurred on 27 July 2019, had been sentenced to prison for one year for obstructing police while performing their duties. Numerous pro-democracy organisations protested outside the Lai Chi Kok Reception Centre. One hundred citizens participated. Participants criticized the judiciary on the sentencing, stating that Lau was merely providing humanitarian assistance. After one week of jail time, he objected successfully and the High Court eventually reverted the lower court decision and set bail to $10,000 HKD pending appeal.

Seven people were charged with rioting by the police for their involvement in the 2019 Prince Edwards station attack on 31 August 2019.

==== Other developments ====
It has been reported that the Chief Executive (CE) Carrie Lam is to hand-pick suitable judges for conducting national security law cases and violations. In response, former Chief Justice of Hong Kong Andrew Li warned of such actions 'undermining' the judicial independence of Hong Kong in a South China Morning Post opinion piece. He stressed that the CE of Hong Kong had no professional expertise, ability or experience to pick judges, and that the draft of the law still has not been released to the public is "unfortunate". To further express concerns of the power granted to the CE by the national security law, Hong Kong Bar Association published a statement stating that Article 88 of the Basic Law does not allow the executive arm of the Government to "on its own assign or designate any particular type of cases to be adjudicated or tried by specific judge", stressing that such move would "undermine judicial independence". Several days later in a radio talk show, Holden Chow, a pro-Beijing lawyer, criticized the Bar Association statement, and commented that they were causing a 'false' image towards citizens.

=== 24 June ===
The United States issued a report on anti-terrorism on 24 June. The report stated that there were no terrorist activities in Hong Kong, and condemned the Hong Kong government of labelling some pro-democracy protests as terrorism.

Following the criticism of the national security law, a third group of lawyers and judges voiced their concerns. The usually conservative Law Society of Hong Kong condemned the national security law and issued a statement, stressing that the judicial process relating to the national security law would undermine judicial independence in Hong Kong. Members of the society criticized that it would lead to major suspicions on whether basic human rights such as right to a fair trial can be sustained. The society hoped that the government could assert the queries as soon as possible. In addition, they also remarked that if stakeholders from all sectors of society could be consulted in the drafting process, it would enhance confidence among the public, and it would not violate the Basic Law as well as the one country, two systems principle.

Beijing officials met with 120 pro-establishment politicians to collect views and suggestions on the national security law, being the first time that Hong Kong politicians were consulted in Hong Kong by the CPC. The forum was hosted by Zhang Xiaoming, deputy director of the Hong Kong and Macao Affairs Office, and Zhang Yong, vice chairman of the Basic Law Committee. Pro-Beijing scholar Albert Chen and chairman of the Independent Police Complaints Council Anthony Neoh were also present.

=== 25 June ===
==== International response: USA ====
The United States Senate unanimously passed a bill sanctioning China over its political interference of Hong Kong democracy and freedom. The bipartisan bill, called "Hong Kong Autonomy Act", will "impose mandatory sanctions on entities that violate China's obligations to Hong Kong under the Joint Declaration and the Basic Law. The legislation would also impose mandatory secondary sanctions on banks that do business with the entities in violation of the Basic Law."

==== Progress of court cases ====
A stage technician, Yiu Siu-Hong, was sentenced to four years of prison by District Judge Amanda Woodcock, for attempting to throw a Molotov cocktail in Tseung Kwan O in October 2019. Woodcock ruled that Yiu, who had a second bottle with flammable liquid, as well as items commonly used by the protesters in his rucksack when he was arrested, had to be regarded as a common criminal rather than protester. Yiu had earlier pleaded guilty to two charges, which was a reason for the judge to order the sentences to be served concurrently, and to further reduce the resulting sentence. The court earlier heard that Yiu's mother had succumbed to lung cancer in late May.

==== Other developments ====
Pro-China politician Elsie Leung stated that Beijing decided not to disclose the full text of the national security law as it aimed to prevent further 'unrest' and delays to the legislation. She said in a RTHK program on June 25 that making the bill public "may cause demonstrations and strong opposition against the law." She further stressed that Beijing does not want to see social unrest or vandalism in Hong Kong. She also dismissed fears law drafters might not have taken public opinion into consideration. Leung said that it was highly likely that it could be implemented by the end of June, and it would come in effect on 1 July. In the program LegCo Review, Leung emphasized that by calling out words and slogans such as 'Liberate' would violate the national security law as it was an 'act to separate the idea of one country, two systems.' She also defended plans for Carrie Lam to hand-pick judges to handle the national security law cases.

According to a report by Apple Daily, it was revealed in a court hearing on the practices of members of the Hong Kong Police Force in the protests that the police force had changed some of its rules and regulations on 27 November 2019, without making any announcement to the public. They included: riot police and undercover police officers did not have to show their police identification materials instantly under specific circumstances; in a group of police, only the most senior officer showing police identification materials would be adequate and other police officers did not have to necessarily do so; and that riot police officers did not have to show their identification materials and code on their riot police uniforms.

Netizens called for an assembly in IFC, in memory of those protesters and those who have been sentenced to jail. Around 20 citizens chanted slogans and sang "Glory to Hong Kong" in the assembly. They also wrote letters and words towards those in prison, encouraging them to pursue their dreams and ambitions. Some people also waved the British colonial Flag of Hong Kong (1959–1997).

=== 26 June ===
==== Call by former United Nations envoys, statement by UN OHCHR ====
Zeid Raad Al Hussein, the former United Nations High Commissioner for Human Rights, and eight former United Nations (UN) special envoys expressed deep concern about what they called a potential "humanitarian tragedy" caused by China pushing forward its National Security Law, and called on the UN to appoint a special envoy to monitor the situation in Hong Kong. As of 16 September, UN Secretary General António Guterres had not responded to the letter.

The UN Office of the High Commissioner for Human Rights published a statement by 51 UN independent human rights experts which called on China to withdraw the draft national security law for Hong Kong. China objected and condemned the speculations as interference with internal affairs.

==== Yoho Mall conflict ====
At Yoho Mall in Yuen Long, at around 1:30 pm, dozens stood on different floors and chanted pro-democracy slogans after a man in the atrium displayed pro-democracy banners. Riot police entered the mall and set up cordons, but were unable to clear the mall from protesters, who continued to chant slogans. A Stand News reporter was pushed over by plainclothes officers. Police arrested 14 people for unlawful assembly, among them 9 men and 5 women, with their ages ranging from 14 to 55 years. A 12-year-old student reporter was taken away. Police used pepper spray during the last part of its operations, which hit Yuen Long District Councillor Lam Chun and Kalvin Ho, Vice-chairman of the Hong Kong Association for Democracy and People's Livelihood.

=== 27 June ===
For the first time since its inception in 2003, the annual 1 July march was banned. In its official Letter of Objection to the Civil Human Rights Front (CHRF), police cited pandemic health concerns as well as risks due to "persisting social unrest". An appeal by the CHRF against the ban was rejected by Chief Secretary Matthew Cheung, as was a request for permission to hold a demonstration that was lodged by District Councillor Chui Chi-kin.

=== 28 June ===
==== Silent march against national security law ====
Dozens of citizens heeded online calls for an "Anti-National Security Law Silent March", in response to Sunday's National People's Congress Standing Committee's fast-tracking of the National Security Law that is expected to be passed in the next few days. The crowd gathered at Jordan MTR station. At about 3:00 pm, small groups started moving towards Mong Kok via Nathan Road, chanting pro-democracy slogans which included urging each other to come out again in protest on 1 July, the anniversary of the 1997 handover of Hong Kong to China. Early on, police issued warnings for unlawful assembly, but was unable to stop protesters from heading to Mong Kok as they slipped from Nathan Road into side streets. In Mong Kok, police checked the identities and searched the belongings of at least two groups of protesters numbering about 20 people in total. In the course of a dispersal operation in Mong Kok, a police officer briefly fired pepper spray at journalists. The shopping centre at Langham Place closed early for the day. After a lengthy confrontation in which police used tear gas, a total of 53 people, including 41 men and 12 women, were arrested in the Mong Kok area for "unlawful assembly". On their respective Facebook pages, district councillors Ben Lam of Yau Tsim Mong District, and Chui Chi-kin of Eastern District, stated that they were among the arrested. The protests began to die down at around 7:00 pm. A planned protest in Victoria Park which was to start at 3:00 p.m. failed to go ahead, with police patrolling the area around the park.

==== International response: Japan ====
The Yomiuri Shimbun (Japan News) reported that Japanese government was set to issue a statement expressing "regret" over China's national security law over Hong Kong when the law is enacted, increasing the severity from "grave concern" issued on 17 June and from "strong concern" on 25 May. With approximately 1400 companies operating in Hong Kong, Japan was concerned with the undermining of "Hong Kong's high degree of autonomy based on ‘one country, two systems’."

==== Other developments ====
Pro Hong Kong Independence activist Wayne Ka-kui Chan confirmed over his Facebook page that he was no longer in Hong Kong, citing the looming National Security Law retribution. It had been speculated since early June that he had gone into exile in the Netherlands.

=== 29 June ===
==== International response: USA ====
The US State Department issued a statement that the US will end controlled defense exports to Hong Kong as a direct response to "Chinese Communist Party's decision to eviscerate Hong Kong's freedoms". The Commerce Department concurrently produced a statement declaring that the risk that sensitive U.S. technology would be diverted to the People’s Liberation Army or Ministry of State Security had increased, hence the "Commerce Department regulations allowing preferential treatment to Hong Kong over China, including the availability of export license exceptions, are [now] suspended".

==== One-year memorial vigil for Zhita Wu and Hiu-Yan Lo ====
A group of mourners gathered in Fanling to remember the death of Zhita Wu, an EduHK alumnus, and 21-year-old female EduHK student Hiu-Yan Lo. Both Wu and Lo left a dying wish supporting the pro-democracy protest before falling to their death. Lo's signed message, which was found on a wall at her death, had even listed out the five demands of the protesters. The vigil was organized by EduHK's Students' Union. Representatives from several universities, friends, and a EduHK's teaching staff presented flowers and paper cranes.

==== Other developments ====
The Hong Kong government awarded, after a month of searching, the "Relaunch Hong Kong" campaign to Consulum FZ LLC. The one-year, 6.2-million-USD campaign is aimed at presenting Hong Kong as an attractive location to "invest, do business, work, and live", and to "reconnect the city with global audiences" after the negative impacts that had been wreaked by the COVID-19 crisis. According to ProvokeMedia, Consulum's Hong Kong office was established on 15 May 2020, the deadline date required by the submission criteria to have a Hong Kong office. It was reported that several PR firms had ultimately declined the opportunity out of "geopolitical concerns", which appeared to be a veiled reference to the past year of protests in Hong Kong and in particular the impending national security legislation.

=== 30 June ===
==== Promulgation of National Security Law ====
At about 09:30, the Chinese National People's Congress unanimously passed the national security law for Hong Kong, bypassing Hong Kong legislative processes. Details of the law had never been published for Hong Kong public comments before the passage and while Beijing had been discussing the details of the law, only a few selected Hong Kong top officials had some knowledge of it.

Hours later, Lam attended a virtual UN Human Rights meeting claiming that the national security law would not undermine Hong Kong autonomy.

Approximately 14 hours after Beijing's passing of the national security law, Hong Kong government posted the entire law, for the first time, on its official website, at 23:00 on June 30. The law is said to be effectively immediately.

Within 25 minutes, Hong Kong Police issued a statement (at 23:25 June 30) that it will sternly uphold the law and restore peace in Hong Kong (English version at 23:29).

==== International response: International Lifeboat Campaign ====
Various countries and joint nations have begun formulating their visa requirements for Hong Kong protesters and journalists seeking refuge and asylum. The participating countries include USA, Canada, EU, UK, Australia, New Zealand, and ASEAN countries. A call for such efforts was made on the same day by Hong Kong Watch through the launch of its International Lifeboat Campaign.

==== International response: UK ====
In an opinion piece title "China breached the Hong Kong Handover deal – it's time the UK acted like it", UK Parliament Member Jim Shannon of Northern Ireland wrote that "China has taken every opportunity to dismiss and disregard this vital Declaration" and that it is time for Britain to declare a breach of the Joint Declaration so further actions such as imposing Magnitsky-style sanctions on Hong Kong senior officials can have a more impactful outcome.

Former Hong Kong governor Chris Patten led the condemnation of Beijing's national security law passage, along with 902 international signatories, citing that the law directly "breach of China's commitments under the Sino-British Joint Declaration and the Hong Kong Government's obligations as a signatory of the International Covenant on Civil and Political Rights."

==== International response: 27 Country Joint Statement ====
Speaking on behalf of 27 countries, UK's Ambassador to the WTO and UN Julian Braithwaite delivered a cross-regional joint statement in response to China's passing of the Hong Kong national security law. In the speech Braithwaite stressed that passing a law "without the direct participation of Hong Kong's people, legislature or judiciary of Hong Kong undermines ‘One Country, Two Systems’." The list of countries supporting his statement are Australia, Austria, Belgium, Belize, Canada, Denmark, Estonia, Finland, France, Iceland, Ireland, Germany, Japan, Latvia, Liechtenstein, Lithuania, Luxembourg, the Republic of the Marshall Islands, the Kingdom of the Netherlands, New Zealand, Norway, Palau, Slovakia, Slovenia, Sweden, Switzerland, and the United Kingdom.

==== International response: Japan ====
On Tuesday Japan's Chief Cabinet Secretary Yoshihide Suga stated that China's enactment of national security law in Hong Kong was "regrettable" and that Hong Kong must maintain "its free and open system so that it can prosper in a democratic and stable way."

==== International response: Taiwan ====
Taiwan government condemned the passage of the national security law. Taiwan Cabinet Spokesperson Ting Yi-ming issued a press release stating that the law "severely impacts freedom, human rights, and the stable development of Hong Kong society." He further warned Taiwanese citizens living in Hong Kong to beware of "possible risks".

==== International response: USA ====
Speaker of the U.S. House of Representatives Nancy Pelosi issued a statement urging the US Government to "hold Chinese officials accountable for their abuses including in Hong Kong by deploying sanctions under the 2016 Magnitsky Act and by taking steps under the Hong Kong Human Rights and Democracy Act, proudly passed by Congress. We must consider all tools available, including visa limitations and economic penalties."

Concurrently, USA's Federal Communications Commission (FCC) designated Chinese technology companies Huawei and ZTE as a "national security threat" and prohibited "money from the FCC's $8.3 billion a year Universal Service Fund may no longer be used to purchase, obtain, maintain, improve, modify, or otherwise support any equipment or services produced or provided by these suppliers."

==== Other developments ====
Within hours of the national security law passage in Beijing, Demosisto founders Joshua Wong, Nathan Law, Agnes Chow, and standing committee member Jeffrey Ngo withdrew from the organization. In a Twitter post, Wong cited concerns about the possibility of long imprisonment as one reason for his resignation, and vowed to continue the fight for pro-democracy ideals. In a Facebook post soon after, Demosisto declared that it had disbanded, advising its members to "use more flexible means to join in protests".

Another pro-democracy organization that is being disbanded in Hong Kong within hours of the law passage is the Hong Kong National Front. Their pro-Hong Kong independence fight against China will continue from their Taipei and England branch, according to the group's Facebook page. The Hong Kong Higher Institutes International Affairs Delegation (HKHIIAD) vice president Joey Siu announced her withdrawal from the organization and with continue "the journey of fighting for Hong Kong in personal capacity".

Throughout the day various grassroots pro-freedom/pro-democracy events continue to take place all over Hong Kong: countless citizens lay flowers at MTR's Prince Edward Station for the 10-month memorial of the Prince Edward Station Attack Incident on August 31, 2019, a one minute of silence observed at 20:31 at all MTR stations, a "one year memorial" of Lo Hiu-Yan and Zhita Wu at Central's IFC, where Wu committed suicide, a "Lunch With You" in Central Landmark, a "Sing With You" took place in Kwun Tong APM mall.
