= 12 June 2019 Hong Kong protest =

- 6.12 金鐘警民衝突 (Chinese); Part of 2019–20 Hong Kong protests
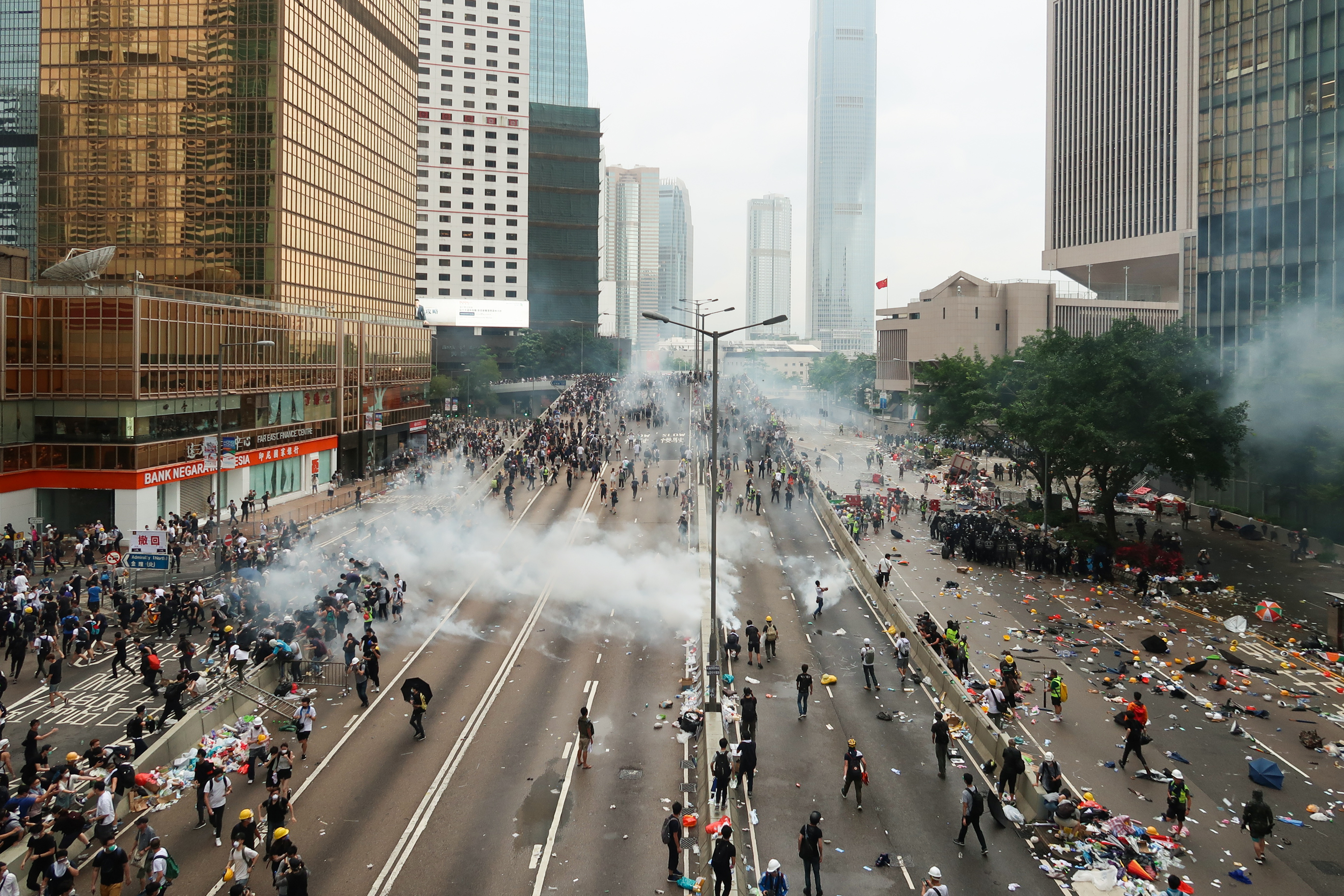
- Date: 12 June 2019; 7 years ago
- Location: Admiralty, Hong Kong
- Caused by: Chief Executive Carrie Lam pushing ahead with the second reading of the extradition bill despite mass opposition
- Goals: To successfully stall the second reading of the bill; To demand the government to fully withdraw the extradition bill
- Methods: Occupation
- Result: The government suspended the extradition bill on 15 June; The government characterised the 12 June incident as a "riot", though they later partially retracted the characterisation, saying that only 5 of the arrestees rioted.; One man committed suicide in response to the police's misconduct.; Protesters laid out five key demands, which include the establishment of an independent commission of inquiry into police conduct and use of force during the protests

Parties
Protesters Political parties: Pro-democracy lawmakers; Civil Human Rights Front; Democratic Party; Hong Kong Pastors Network; HKCFSC	Government of Hong Kong: Hong Kong Police Force; Legislative Council of Hong Kong; Political parties: Pro-Beijing lawmakers

Lead figures
No centralised leadership Wu Chi-wai	Carrie Lam; Stephen Lo; Rupert Dover; David Jordan; Mark Antiss; Andrew Leung

Number
40,000 protesters	More than 5,000 police

Casualties and losses
81 protesters injured	22 police officers injured

Injuries and arrests
- Arrested: 32 (as of 17 June)

The 12 June 2019 Hong Kong protest, also known as "612 incident" (Chinese: 6.12 金鐘警民衝突). refers to an incident of intense confrontation between anti-extradition bill protesters and the Hong Kong Police Force, occurring on 12 June 2019 outside the Government Headquarters in Admiralty, Hong Kong Island. The protest was sparked by the government's introduction of the controversial Fugitive Offenders amendment bill, which was set to go through second reading on 12 June despite mass opposition.

40,000 protesters gathered outside the Government Headquarters attempted and successfully stalled the second reading of the bill, though the Police deployed numerous canisters of tear gas, rubber bullets and bean bag rounds to disperse the protesters. The government and the police characterised the protest as a "riot", though they later partially retracted the claim and said that only five of the arrestees rioted. The police were widely criticised for its excessive use of force and arrests of protesters inside hospitals. In particular, the kettling of protesters inside CITIC Tower, was widely condemned.

The conflict was the most serious and intense conflict between the police and the protesters during the early stage of the 2019–20 Hong Kong protests. Protesters began to lay down their five core demands, including the establishment of an independent commission of inquiry into police conduct and use of force and the release and exoneration of arrested protesters. Subsequent protests saw protesters and the police clashing with each other as the number of allegations of police misconduct continued to increase.

== Background ==
The protest was sparked by the introduction of the Fugitive Offenders amendment bill by the Hong Kong government. The bill, if enacted, would have allowed the Hong Kong government to extradite criminal fugitives who are wanted in territories to areas including Taiwan and mainland China. This created concerns that the bill would subject Hong Kong residents and visitors to the mainland Chinese jurisdiction and legal system, undermining the region's autonomy and its civil liberties.

On 9 June 2019, an estimated 1 million protesters marched on the streets of Hong Kong Island to demand the government to withdraw the controversial extradition bill. The march escalated into intense conflicts between the police and the protesters. Chief Executive Carrie Lam announced on the next day that she acknowledged the march protest and understood that were "clearly still concerns" among citizens of Hong Kong over the bill. However, she affirmed that the bill would be passed to the Legislative Council for its second reading on 12 June, despite mass opposition. In response, activists began to call for a general strike and mobilise members from the public to protest outside the Government Headquarters to stall the bill from passing its second reading.

== Timeline ==
=== Early stage ===
A Facebook post calling on people to "enjoy a picnic" at Tamar Park on 11 June attracted 2,000 people. In anticipation of the protest the next day, the police force tightened security. Inside Admiralty station, about 50 to 60 police officers stopped commuters, mostly teenagers and searched their bags. Pan-democrats arrived to assist the teens and questioned the police's lack of justification for the search, and about 300 passers-by gathered near the site of conflicts, many of them shouted to condemn the police's decision. The police left the station at 9:05 pm.

=== General strike and occupation ===
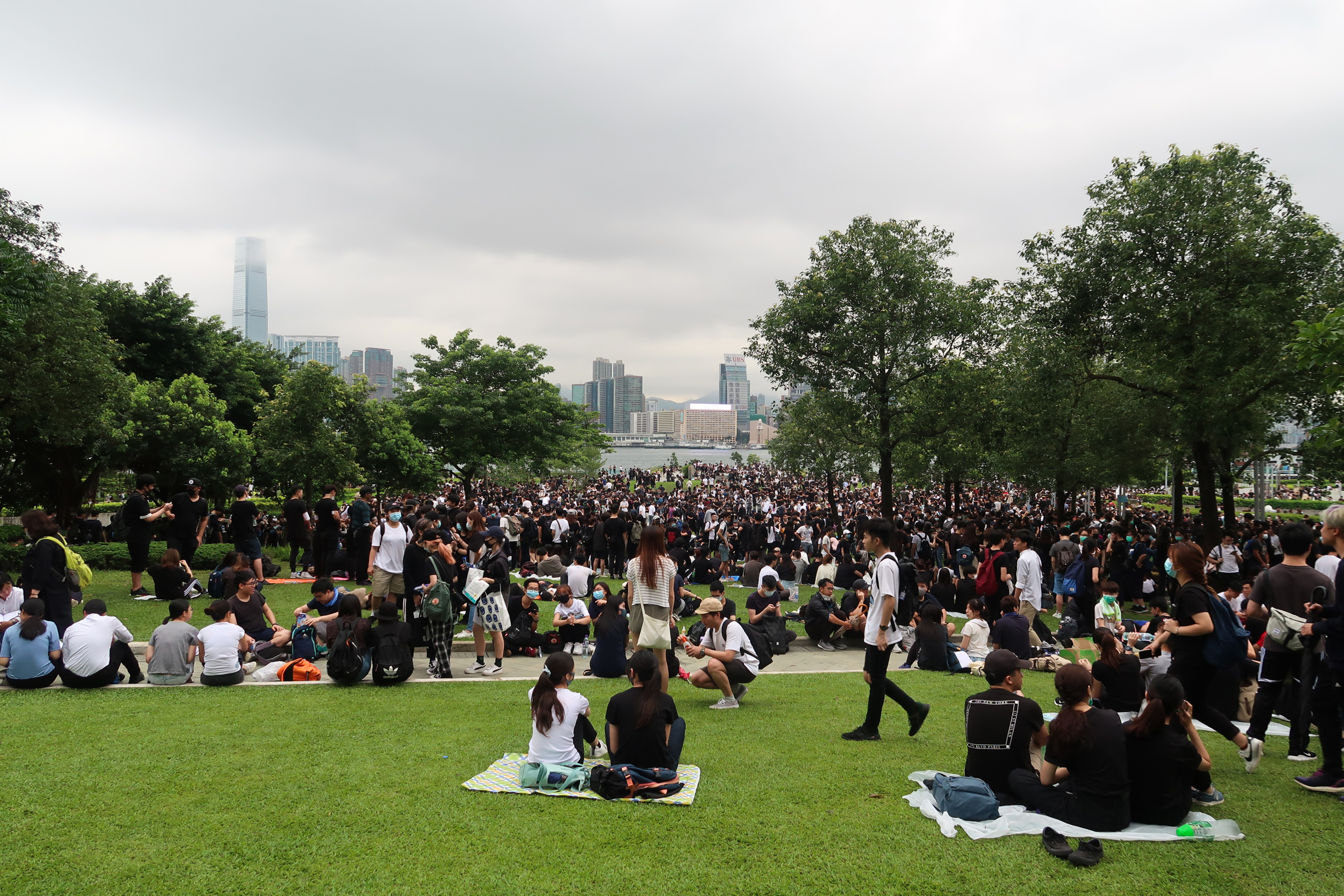
Online groups called on people to "picnic" on the morning of 12 June at Tamar Park.

A general strike had been called for 12 June, the day of the planned resumption of the second reading of the extradition bill. The Hong Kong Confederation of Trade Unions (HKCTU) appealed to workers to join the protest; hundreds of businesses closed for the day and numerous workers went on strike. Affiliate Hong Kong Cabin Crew Federation also called a strike. HSBC, Standard Chartered and Bank of East Asia closed some central branches; some of the banks and the Big Four accounting firms had agreed to flexible work arrangements for staff; Hong Kong Jockey Club shut down three of its central betting branches, citing employee safety. The Hong Kong Professional Teachers' Union (HKPTU) called on its members to attend a protest rally after school hours on that day. Student unions of most of the major higher education institutions had also called for student strike on 12 June; 50 social welfare and religious groups also took part in the strike. The Catholic Diocese of Hong Kong urged the Hong Kong government and the public to show restraint, and the administration "not to rush to amend the extradition bill before fully responding to the concerns of the legal sector and the public."

Another call to "picnic" at Tamar Park on 12 June attracted close to 10,000 responses. The Legislative Council Commission issued an amber security alert. The protest zone outside the building was closed and access to the complex was limited. Sit-ins began in the morning and a large crowd built up at the MTR exit. In the early morning hours, the crowd rushed onto Harcourt Road and Lung Wo Road, blocking these streets in scenes reminiscent of the 2014 Umbrella Movement protests. A banner with "Majority calls on Carrie Lam to step down" and "Withdraw the extradition bill, defend One Country Two Systems" written on it was hung from the Admiralty Centre footbridge. Around 11 am, the Legislative Council Secretariat announced that the second reading debate on the extradition bill had been postponed indefinitely.

=== Violent clashes ===
Police vans carrying riot police began to line up adjacent to the Hong Kong Academy for Performing Arts and the Hong Kong Convention and Exhibition Centre on standby, around 1 pm. A source in the pro-Beijing camp said that some pro-Beijing legislators were at Central Police District Headquarters, while online groups called on protesters to block vehicles that might be used to transport the legislators to the Legislative Council.

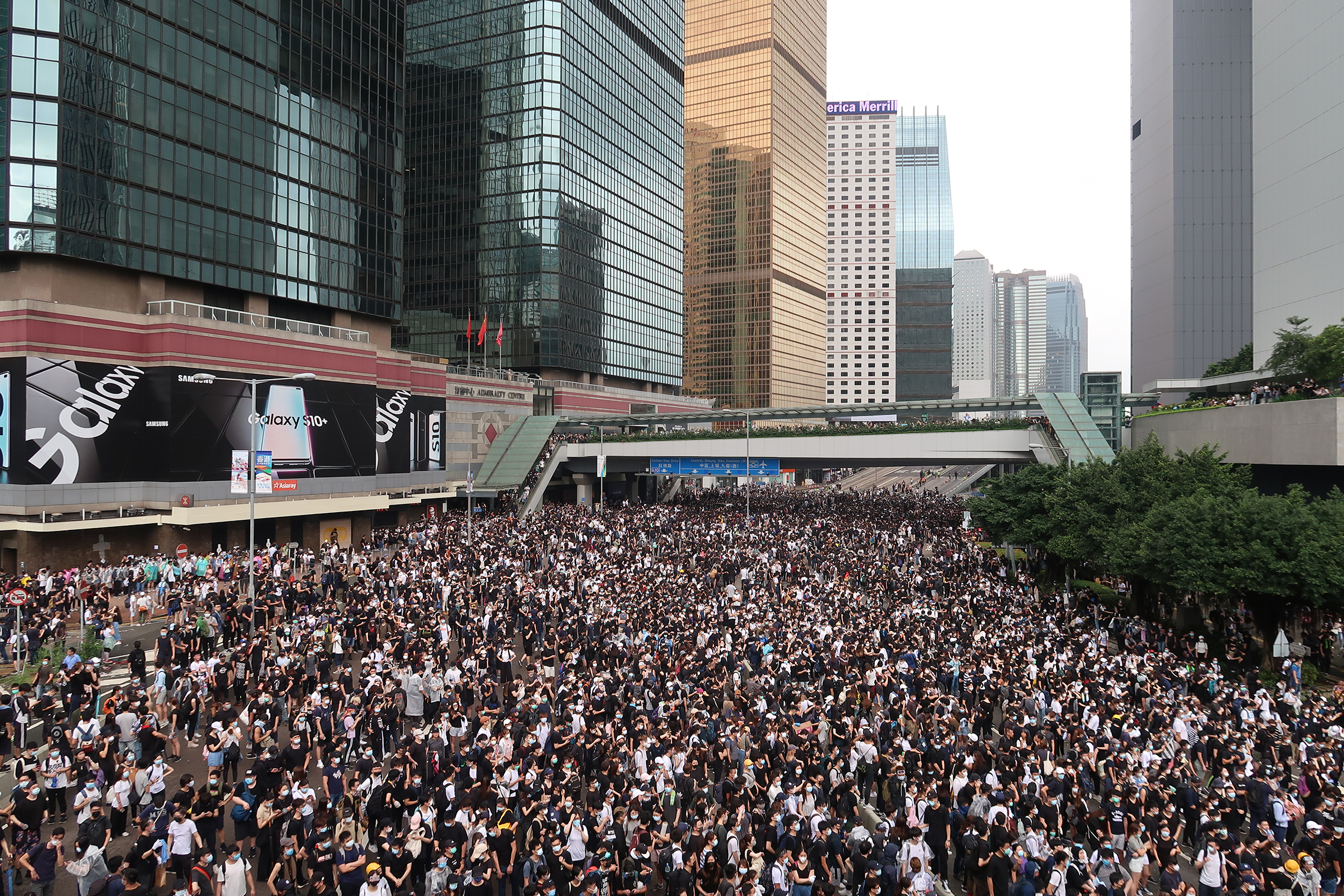
Protesters occupied Harcourt Road.

Around 3:20 pm, protesters on Tim Wa Avenue began to charge the police barricades and were doused with pepper spray in reply. Some protesters at the junction of Lung Wo Road and Tim Wa Avenue broke through the barricades and took over Tim Wa Avenue after riot police walked into the government headquarters, leaving a Special Tactical Unit to defend. Protesters also attempted to charge the Legislative Council building. Riot police dispersed the protesters by firing tear gas, beanbag rounds and rubber bullets.

There was a stand-off on Harcourt Road between protesters and the police. Many protesters took shelter in the buildings nearby as more tear gas was fired. As of 6 pm, 22 injured people had been sent to public hospitals. At around 6:20 pm, the Legislative Council Secretariat issued a circular saying Legislative Council President Andrew Leung had called off the meeting. Protesters remained in the streets outside the AIA Tower in Central, Queensway outside Pacific Place shopping mall, and at the junction of Arsenal Street and Hennessy Road in Wan Chai into the night. In Central, private cars were employed to block Connaught Road Central while protesters chanted slogans from the Exchange Square bridge. Protesters defied sustained efforts by police to disperse them after nightfall. By the end of the day, at least 79 protesters and police officers had been treated in hospitals; around 150 tear gas canisters, "several" rounds of rubber bullets, and 20 beanbag shots had been fired during the protest clearance.

Overnight, 2,000 protesters from religious groups held a vigil outside the government headquarters, singing hymns and praying. Various trade unions, businesses and schools also vowed to stage protests. The Hong Kong Professional Teachers' Union called for a city-wide strike lasting a week. At least 4,000 Hong Kong teachers followed the call.

=== Siege of CITIC Tower ===
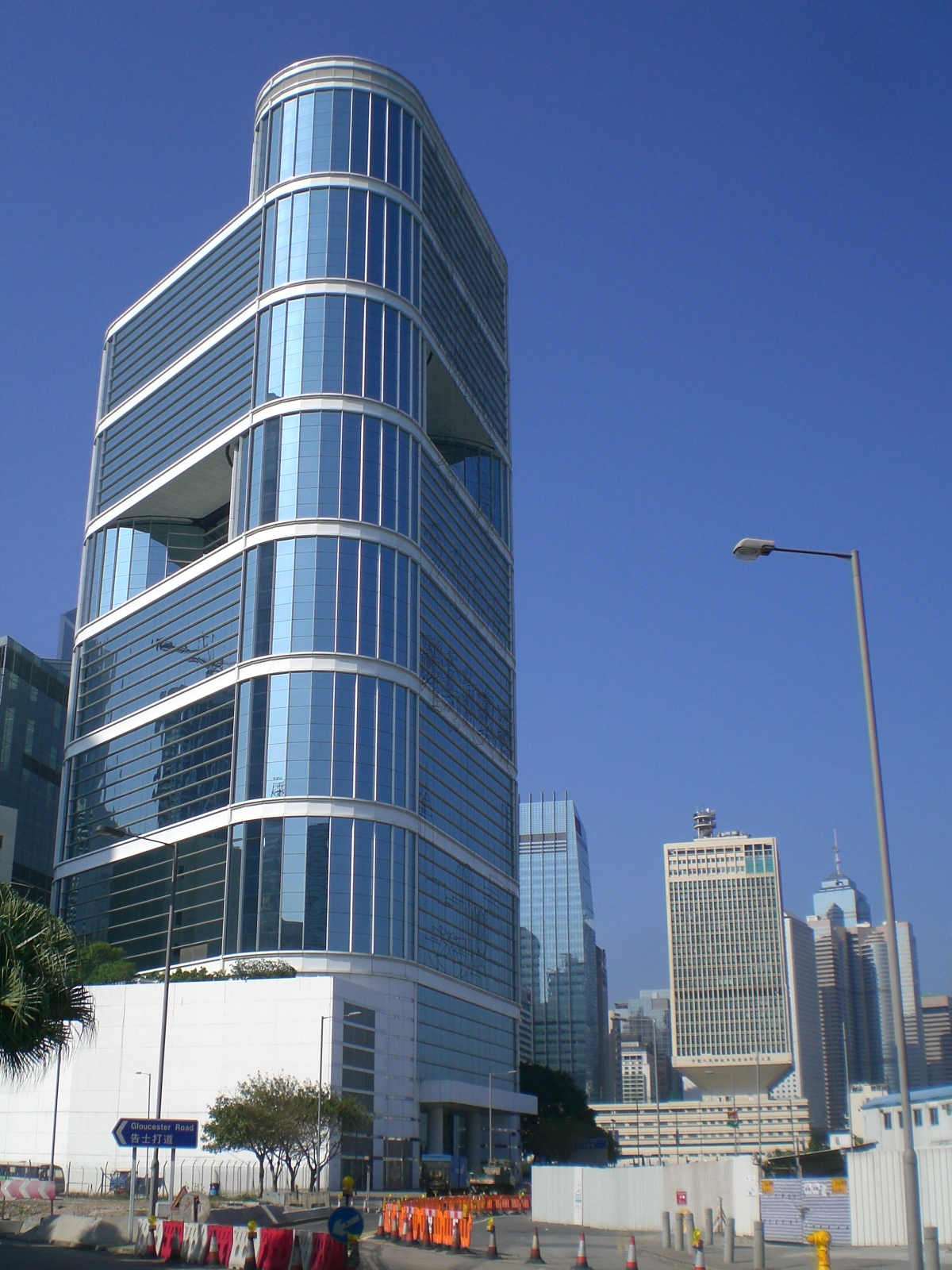
CITIC Tower from Lung Wui Road.

According to the CHRF, the police had earlier agreed to peaceful demonstration within the area outside CITIC Tower in its letter of no objection. However, the peaceful rally was disrupted by the police when teargas was fired into the middle of the crowd. Videos depicting the police firing tear gas as in a pincer movement on both sides of Lung Wui Road near Citic Tower at around 4 pm went viral on Hong Kong social media. People who were trying to push into the building to flee the gas found the doors locked and themselves cornered by police.

As people trickled through the jammed central revolving door and a small side door, the police fired another two tear gas canisters into the trapped crowd, fuelling panic. Protesters attempted to break down another locked side door in a desperate attempt to gain entry. Pro-democrat legislators criticised the police action which nearly caused a stampede. Amnesty International also criticised the use of tear gas against the trapped crowd.

== Police brutality allegations ==
=== Use of force ===
Many videos of aggressive police action appeared online: one showed tear gas canisters being fired at peaceful and unarmed protesters, first-aid volunteers, and even reporters. One video showed a protester apparently being hit in the face by a police projectile; another showed police firing multiple rounds of tear gas at hundreds of trapped protesters outside CITIC Tower. A New York Times video essay showed tear gas was deployed as an "offensive weapon" and that in several cases, unarmed protesters were beaten and dragged by police commanders. On 21 June, Amnesty International published a report examining policing tactics by its team of experts who examined footage of 14 incidents. Video showed apparent unlawful use of batons with the police beating unresisting protesters who were already subdued. The police was also criticised for using rubber bullets dangerously, with the police shooting projectiles directly at protesters' faces. There were also the improper use of riot control agents with peaceful, unarmed passers-by being pepper-sprayed, lack of visible police identification and restrictions on journalists and medics. Amnesty concluded that the use of force by police against the largely peaceful protest was unnecessary and excessive and that police had "violated international human rights law and standards." The right eye of a male teacher from Diocesan Girls' School was ruptured by police projectiles, which permanently affected his eyesight.

Protesters complained about the lack of identifying numbers on the uniforms of the Special Tactical Squad (STS), who were accused of police brutality. During the 2014 Occupy protests, the 2016 Mong Kok civil unrest, and the 9 June clashes, police uniforms had always displayed numbers. The numbers appeared to have disappeared since 12 June, when police officers began wearing newly designed uniforms without numbers. Although Secretary Lee claimed there was no space on the new uniforms to display their numbers, it is an operational requirement. Meanwhile, a spokesman for the police complained that personal information of more than 400 officers and about 100 of their family members had been posted online. Activists have also targeted senior officers in the force who are British, questioning the legacy of colonial violence.

Top bodies of the United Nations condemned the actions of police. A spokesman for the U.N. High Commissioner for Human Rights Michelle Bachelet said she was concerned by the "escalation of violence" in Hong Kong, and Rupert Colville said the UN Human Rights Office had also reviewed credible evidence that police were using "less-lethal weapons in ways that are prohibited by international norms". Carrie Lam and Stephen Lo repeatedly sidestepped questions over police violence and rejected protesters' demands for an independent inquiry into the policing of the 12 June protest, only replying that the Complaints Against Police Office (CAPO) and the Independent Police Complaints Council (IPCC) – both of which are internal institutions – would look into the complaints.

Chief superintendents Rupert Dover and David Jordan have been singled out by the activists for their handling and suppression of the protest, which injured 22 police officers and 81 protesters. Helen Goodman criticised superintendent Justin Shave for ordering his team to fire tear gas at Wu Chi-wai, an unarmed Legislative Councilor who was demanding to meet the police's commander. Two people sustained severe injuries according to the police.

=== Assaults on journalists ===
The Hong Kong Journalists Association (HKJA) accused the police of "trampl[ing] on reporters" and ignoring their safety. They complained that the police had unreasonably interfered with newsgathering by shining flashlights directly at them to disperse them. A driver for public broadcaster RTHK was hit by a tear gas round and sent to hospital after he suffered a cardiac arrest. The HKJA also said members complained that some police officers had been verbally insulting and abusive, including the use of profanity at a member of the press. Another online video showed riot police firing tear gas rounds directly at a journalist. The HKJA filed a complaint with the Independent Police Complaints Council (IPCC) claiming police had caused bodily harm to 26 journalists during the protests. The police press conference on 13 June was attended by reporters wearing high-visibility vests, helmets and gas masks in protest. The Committee to Protect Journalists reported that a journalist was hit with a baton, a backpack of a journalist was hit by a baton, police fired tear gas at a group of journalists wearing yellow "Press" vests, police pepper sprayed a photojournalist and police dispersed journalists swinging batons at and chasing them.

== Arrests ==
The police arrested 32 people following the protest. Commissioner of Police Stephen Lo declared the clashes a "riot" and condemned the protesters' behaviour. Speaking in Cantonese, Lo used the term for "disturbance", but a police spokesman later clarified he meant "riot". Chief Executive Carrie Lam backed Lo, saying the protesters' "dangerous and life-threatening acts" had devolved into a "blatant, organised riot". Lo later backed down from the riot characterisation, saying that of all protesters, only five of them rioted. He added that "most of the other people who joined the public event were peaceful protesters. They did not need to worry that they committed rioting crimes." However, the five people who were arrested for rioting were all released without charge on 24 October.

=== Hospital arrests ===
At least four protesters were arrested at hospitals while receiving treatment following clashes earlier that day. The police chief admitted that officers had accessed medical records, raising concerns over confidentiality of patient information. On 17 June, Legislative Councillor for the Medical constituency Pierre Chan presented a partial list that disclosed the information of 76 patients who had been treated in the emergency ward of a public hospital on 12 and 13 June, along with a note that stated "for police" which was written on the top-left corner of the document. Chan said such a list could be obtained through the clinical data system in some hospitals without requiring a password and accused the Hong Kong Hospital Authority (HKHA) for leaking patients' data to the police. The HKHA denied the accusation, stressing that it had never authorised anyone to print the patients' data for police officers.

The Hong Kong Adventist Hospital in Tsuen Wan also reportedly refused to treat an injured protester and advised the person to go to Yan Chai Hospital before reporting him to the police. The private hospital told media that its protocol prohibits it from handling cases related to "criminal activities", adding that patients involved in such cases are referred to a public hospital.

Tensions grew between the medical profession and the police force with both parties accused of verbal harassment and abuse. The police force later withdrew from posts at Queen Elizabeth Hospital and Yan Chai Hospital.

== Aftermath ==
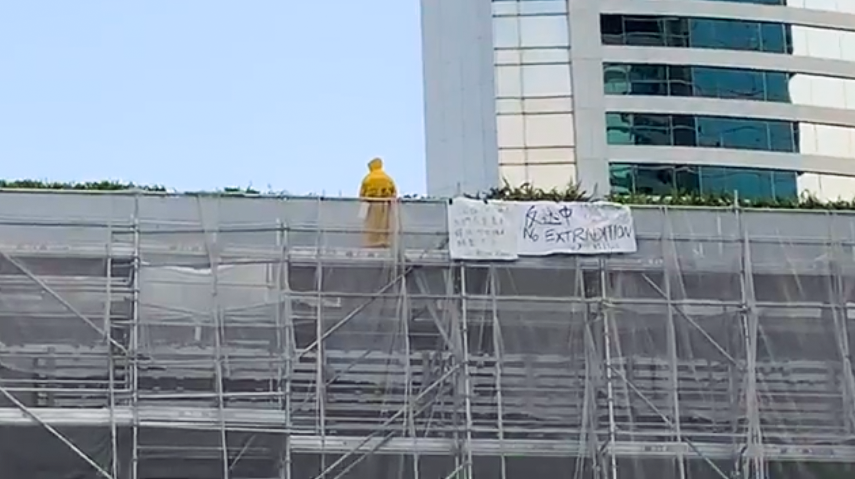
Marco Leung Ling-kit on scaffolding at Pacific Place before he fell to his death on 15 June.

Protests against the extradition bill continued after 12 June, as the protesters only managed to delay the second reading of the bill. In response to the alleged police brutality, protesters began asking for the establishment of an independent commission of inquiry into police conduct and use of force during the protest and demanding the police to retract the "riot" characterisation. These demands later formed the foundation of the protesters' core five demands.

On 15 June, Chief Executive Carrie Lam announced the "suspension" of the bill but stopped short of fully withdrawing it. Responding to the 12 June incident, she supported the police, calling them "restrained" and that she agreed with the riot characterisation. Shortly afterward, a 35-year-old man named Marco Leung Ling-kit climbed to the elevated podium on the rooftop of Pacific Place. Wearing a yellow raincoat with the words "Brutal police are cold-blooded" and "Carrie Lam is killing Hong Kong", he fell to his death after a five-hour standoff. On 16 June, the Civil Human Rights Front organised a massive rally, attracting 2 million people.

The government rejected the formation of an independent inquiry and stated that the Independent Police Complaints Council (IPCC), an internal institution, would look into the complaints. Following the 12 June incident, the attention of the protests shifted to the confrontations between the police force and the protesters. The number of allegations of Police misconduct continued to increase in subsequent protests, as protests escalated into intense conflicts between both sides.

Robert Godden, the founder of human rights consultancy Rights Exposure, named the 12 June incident as the "first escalation of force" and that most of the subsequent protests were "a spiralling escalation" based on what had happened on 12 June. Commenting on the police's tactics, he described them as "very indiscriminate, very blunt, very unplanned, very unsophisticated".

On 15 May 2020, a 22-year-old man surnamed Sin was sentenced to four years in prison for his participation in the protest, becoming the first person to be jailed for the charge of rioting since the protest movement started. A male participant surnamed Leung was charged with rioting on 17 May 2023.

== See also ==
- Ignite Hong Kong - Awakening the Public march
