= Rupert Dover =

Hong Kong police officer

- Born: Rupert Timothy Alan Dover; 19 August 1967 (age 59); Hertford, United Kingdom
- Spouse: Sze Cheung (m. 2014)
- Police career
- Allegiance: Hong Kong Police Force
- Department: Kowloon West Region
- Service years: 1988–2024
- Status: Retired
- Rank: Assistant Commissioner
- Awards: Chief Executive's Commendation

Rupert Timothy Alan Dover
- Traditional Chinese: 陶輝
- Simplified Chinese: 陶辉
Transcriptions
Standard Mandarin
- Hanyu Pinyin: Táo Huī
Yue: Cantonese
- Jyutping: tou4 fai1

Rupert Timothy Alan Dover (Chinese: 陶輝, born 19 August 1967) is a retired British-born Assistant Commissioner and Regional Commander of Kowloon West with the Hong Kong Police Force. He retired from the police force in January 2024.

== Early life ==
Dover attended public school in Bedfordshire, leaving Bedford School in 1985. After obtaining an archaeology degree from a British university, Dover joined the then Royal Hong Kong Police Force in 1988 as a probationary inspector.

== Career ==
Dover joined the Royal Hong Kong Police Force in 1988 as Inspector. In 2002, Dover, as a Chief Inspector, was transferred to head the Airport Security Unit. Dover was involved in policing the 2014 Hong Kong protests (Umbrella Revolution). In 2016, he received the Chief Executive's Commendation for Government/Public Service.

In 2019, he commanded the police response to protests about a proposed extradition law on 12 June when the protesters surrounded the Legislative Council Complex in an attempt to stall the bill's second reading. Dover and other officers, particularly non-Chinese, were criticised for their handling of the protests while also targeted with harassment and doxing.

In February 2020, Dover was promoted to Assistant Commissioner of Police and took over the position of Regional Commander, Kowloon West following the retirement of Michael Cheuk Hau Yip (卓孝業). Dover has subsequently retired from the police force in 2024.

== Property controversy ==
On 29 April 2020, in a tabloid-style investigation during which two Next Magazine journalists were arrested on allegations of loitering, it was alleged that Dover's house, and another property linked to Dover, in a village in Clear Water Bay Peninsula had extant violations of building regulations. The property is built on government land, on conditions where residents are prohibited from selling, trading, or leasing out their houses.

On 4 May, the Lands Department sent ten officials to inspect Dover's home to investigate. On 26 May, the Land Department substantiated the allegations of illicit expansion works at Dover's residence, giving the license holder one month to rectify the situation with respect to the illegal structures. Police Commissioner Chris Tang has accused Apple Daily's investigations on senior officers as being retaliation for the 18 April arrest of the paper's founder Jimmy Lai.

== Personal life ==
Rupert Dover is married to Cheung Ngar-sze (Chinese: 張雅詩; also known as Sze Dover), a sergeant in the Hong Kong Police Force.

Police appointments
Preceded by Michael Cheuk	Regional Commander of Kowloon West, Hong Kong; 2020–2024	Succeeded by Jim Lok-chun
