= Marco Leung Ling-kit =

Hong Kong activist (1984–2019)

- 梁凌杰
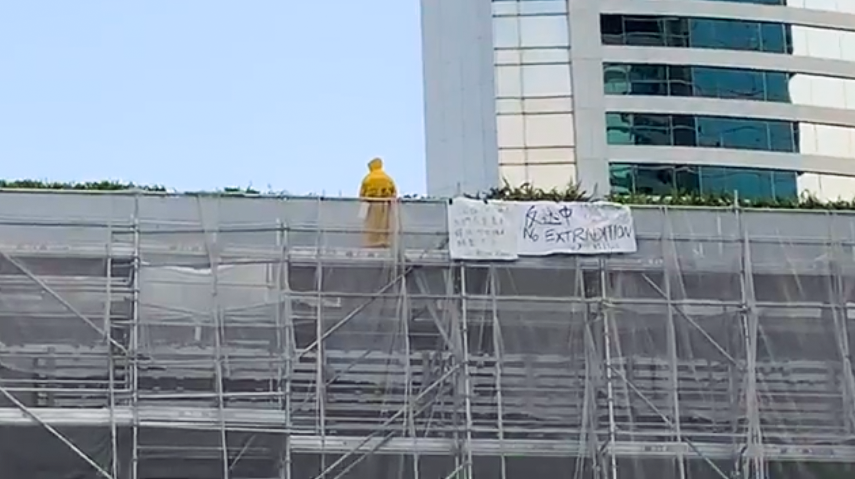
- Leung stand dangerously at a high position at Pacific Place before his death
- Born: Leung Ling-kit; March 7, 1984; British Hong Kong
- Died: June 15, 2019 (aged 35); Wan Chai District, Hong Kong
- Citizenship: British National (Overseas), China
- Education: The Hong Kong Management Association K S Lo College
- Movement: Umbrella Movement

Marco Leung Ling-kit (Chinese: 梁凌杰; Jyutping: loeng4 ling4 git6; March 7, 1984 – June 15, 2019) was a Hong Kong social activist who participated in the Umbrella Revolution and the movement against the extradition bill amendment. On the eve of the "Condemn the Repression, Withdraw the Evil Law" (譴責鎮壓，撤回惡法) protest march held on June 16, 2019, Leung hung banners at a high position in Admiralty’s Pacific Place, demanding the complete withdrawal of the extradition bill amendment rather than a postponement, the release of those arrested during the June 12 police-civilian clashes, and the resignation of Chief Executive Carrie Lam as an act of accountability. He later fell from a height and died that evening, becoming the first casualty of the anti-extradition bill movement. Chief Executive Carrie Lam and the police indicated, either explicitly or implicitly, that Leung died by suicide. However, Leung’s father stated that he faced indifference from the police for a year following his son's death. His lawyer sent multiple letters to the police requesting the submission of the coroner's report but to no avail, raising suspicions of unfair treatment towards his son.

== Biography ==
Marco Leung Ling-kit was single during his lifetime and graduated from Form 5 at the Hong Kong Management Association K. S. Lo College and later repeated Form 5 at the Shung Tak Catholic English College School. He studied a bridging course at Jinan University for three years before dropping out. Afterward, he worked part-time at the Hong Kong Jockey Club, as a van assistant, and in clerical positions at a Japanese department store. Subsequently, he transitioned to London Gold.

He lived with his parents in Yuen Long and had siblings. According to reports from the Hong Kong Economic Times and Sky Post, Leung was known for his charitable activities. He raised funds to help build a Hope Primary School in Hunan Province, China, witnessed the school's completion, participated in rice distribution activities, visited elderly centers, and sponsored a visually impaired boy from Malawi through World Vision.

In 2013, Leung was involved in a case of exporting prohibited items and was arrested by Hong Kong Customs.

Leung participated in the Umbrella Revolution in 2014, primarily stationed in the Mong Kok occupied area, where he earned the nickname "Skeleton." He frequently clashed with the police. During the 2016 Hong Kong Legislative Council election, Leung assisted in the election campaign for Kwok Wai-keung of the Hong Kong Federation of Trade Unions.

In July 2018, Leung was arrested by the police for "conspiracy to defraud" while working as a London Gold investment broker at a company involved in fraudulent activities under the guise of London Gold investment. He was later released on bail pending investigation.

During the protest on June 12, 2019, a person wearing a yellow raincoat and holding an umbrella led a crowd to attack the police line on Tim Wa Avenue. Netizens speculated that this person was Marco Leung.

=== Death ===
At around 4 PM on June 15, 2019, Leung, dressed in a yellow raincoat with "Carrie Lam is killing Hong Kong, police are cold-blooded" (林鄭殺港 黑警冷血) written on the back, climbed onto a temporary work platform over 20 meters high outside Pacific Place in Admiralty. He hung a banner on the scaffolding that read: "Fully withdraw the extradition bill, we are not rioters, release the students and the injured, Carrie Lam step down, Help Hong Kong." The police received a report from the mall security guard stating that Leung was wandering on the platform with a knife and a banner. They arrived on the scene, blocking two westbound lanes of Queensway, and firefighters also set up an inflatable rescue cushion on the ground as a precaution. While Leung was dangerously standing, some people on the scene began singing the hymn "Sing Hallelujah to the Lord." Legislative Councillor Roy Kwong, upon learning of the situation, rushed to the scene to support. He made three requests to the police to speak directly with Leung in order to persuade him to return to a safe place but was refused by the police, who only stated that a police negotiation team was on site. Roy Kwong then stayed on the pedestrian road opposite Queensway, using a loudspeaker to call out, "Come down, we will march together tomorrow," but his voice could not clearly reach the platform at Pacific Place, and Leung was unwilling to talk to the police negotiators. At around 8 PM, Leung took off his yellow coat and sat on the platform to rest, while armed police officers and firefighters were on alert upstairs. Around 9 PM, Leung suddenly climbed out of the scaffolding. Four firefighters tried to pull him back but failed, and he fell after his shirt was pulled off, landing on the pedestrian road next to the safety cushion. Firefighters immediately performed chest compressions to resuscitate Leung, while onlookers shouted encouragement. Witnessing the event, Roy Kwong broke down in tears.

Leung was sent to Ruttonjee Hospital for emergency treatment but was pronounced dead, aged 35, becoming the first death in the anti-extradition bill movement. The police found two suicide notes in Leung's belongings. One was an accusation letter explaining that his reason for suicide was related to opposing the bill, and the other was instructions for his posthumous arrangements. In an interview with Apple Daily, Leung's parents stated that the government had driven Hong Kong people to such despair and that his roar was an expression of anger against an unjust and inhumane government. "Hong Kong is sick; it is the sorrow of seven million people and the sorrow of the next generation," they said. They also hoped that young people would not be too agitated and would not follow in their son's footsteps.

== Memorial ==
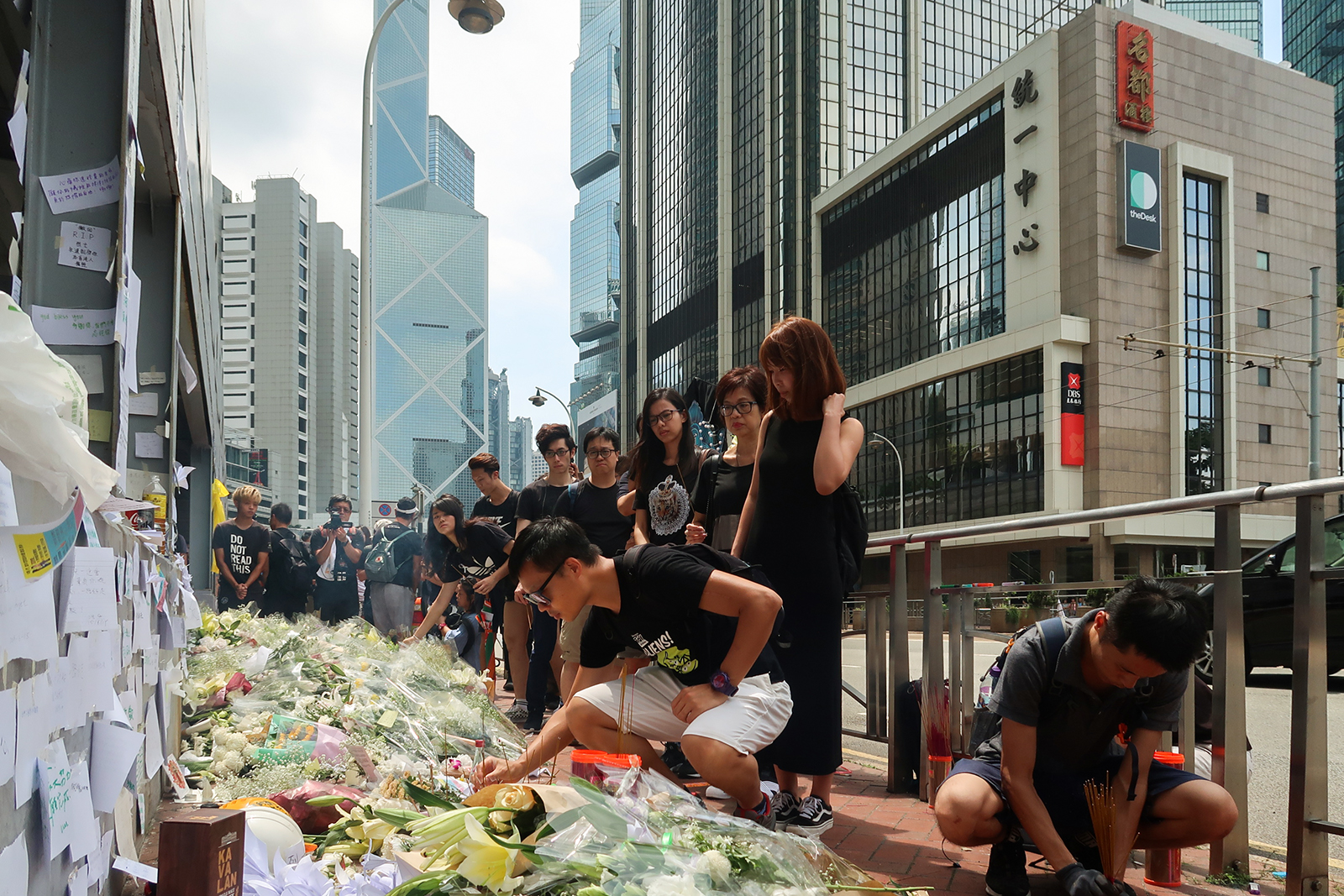
On June 16, citizens paid tribute to Leung Ling-kit by laying flowers at Taikoo Place.

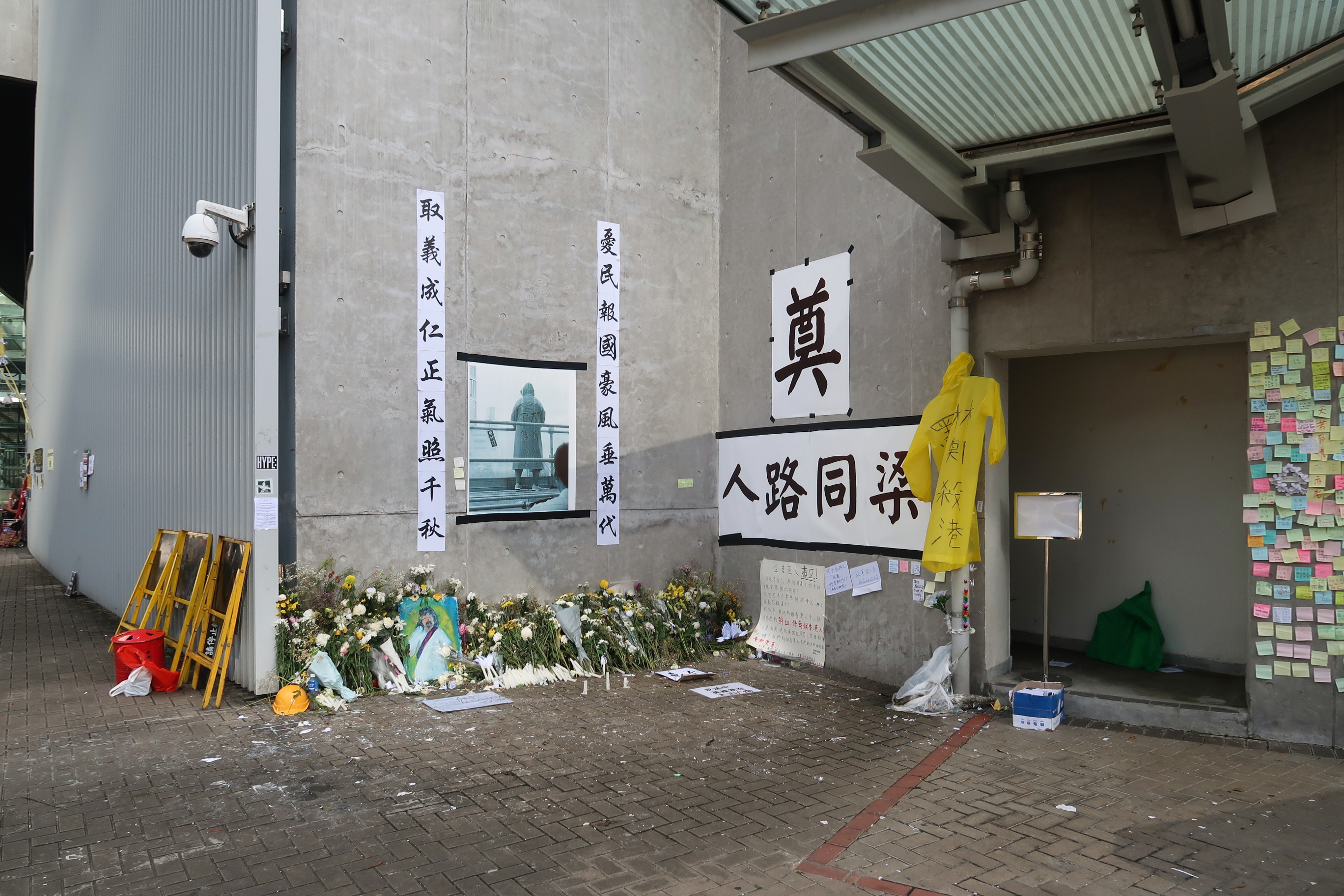
On June 21, Leung Ling-kit's memorial area outside the government headquarters.

On the evening of Leung Ling-kit’s death, dozens of citizens laid flowers outside Taikoo Place to mourn him, including pastor Chu Yiu-ming, one of the "Occupy Central Trio." Additionally, trams passing by sounded their horns in tribute. Some celebrities also expressed their feelings on social media by posting plain black images or in other ways. These included Joey Yung, Sammi Cheng, Charlene Choi, Stephy Tang, Kenny Kwan, Louis Cheung, Carlos Chan, Linda Chung, Cherry Ngan, Crystal Fung, Jeannie Chan, Heidi Lee, Harriet Yeung, Colin Mak, Wyman Wong, Charlotte Cheung, Hins Cheung, Pakho Chau, Hubert Wu, Endy Chow, Eman Lam, Winki Lai, and Yeung Chiu. Miriam Yeung also posted "R.I.P" but later deleted it, which caused some controversy.

On June 16, protesters participating in the anti-extradition bill march laid flowers at the scene of Leung's death. The organizing group, Civil Human Rights Front, announced that 2 million+1 people joined the march, explaining that the "+1" represented Leung Ling-kit. At the "Lennon Wall" outside the Hong Kong government headquarters on Harcourt Road in Admiralty, citizens posted a photo of his back and a couplet reading, "His heroic spirit for the people will last forever, and his righteous cause will shine through the ages." Every 15 minutes, people bowed three times to Leung's photo and then three times towards Taikoo Place. On June 30, the memorial area outside the government headquarters was vandalized by participants in a pro-police rally.

On June 17, at the "Workers Against Extradition" rally organized by the Hong Kong Confederation of Trade Unions, Chairperson Carol Ng read a eulogy, describing Leung as a steadfast believer who sacrificed himself for democracy and freedom, stating that he was "pushed down by the regime." Ng also noted that Leung had participated in the Occupy movement five years earlier and expressed sadness over his passing.

On June 19, during a Legislative Council meeting, Jeremy Tam proposed a moment of silence for Leung Ling-kit. Chairman Andrew Leung rejected the proposal, deeming it did not meet the requirements, leading to protests from pro-democracy lawmakers. Later, Andrew Leung accepted Kenneth Leung's proposal, announcing a five-minute recess. Pro-democracy legislators stood in silence for one minute with white flowers, while most pro-establishment members left the chamber, including Kwok Wai-keung of the Federation of Trade Unions, whom Leung had once helped.

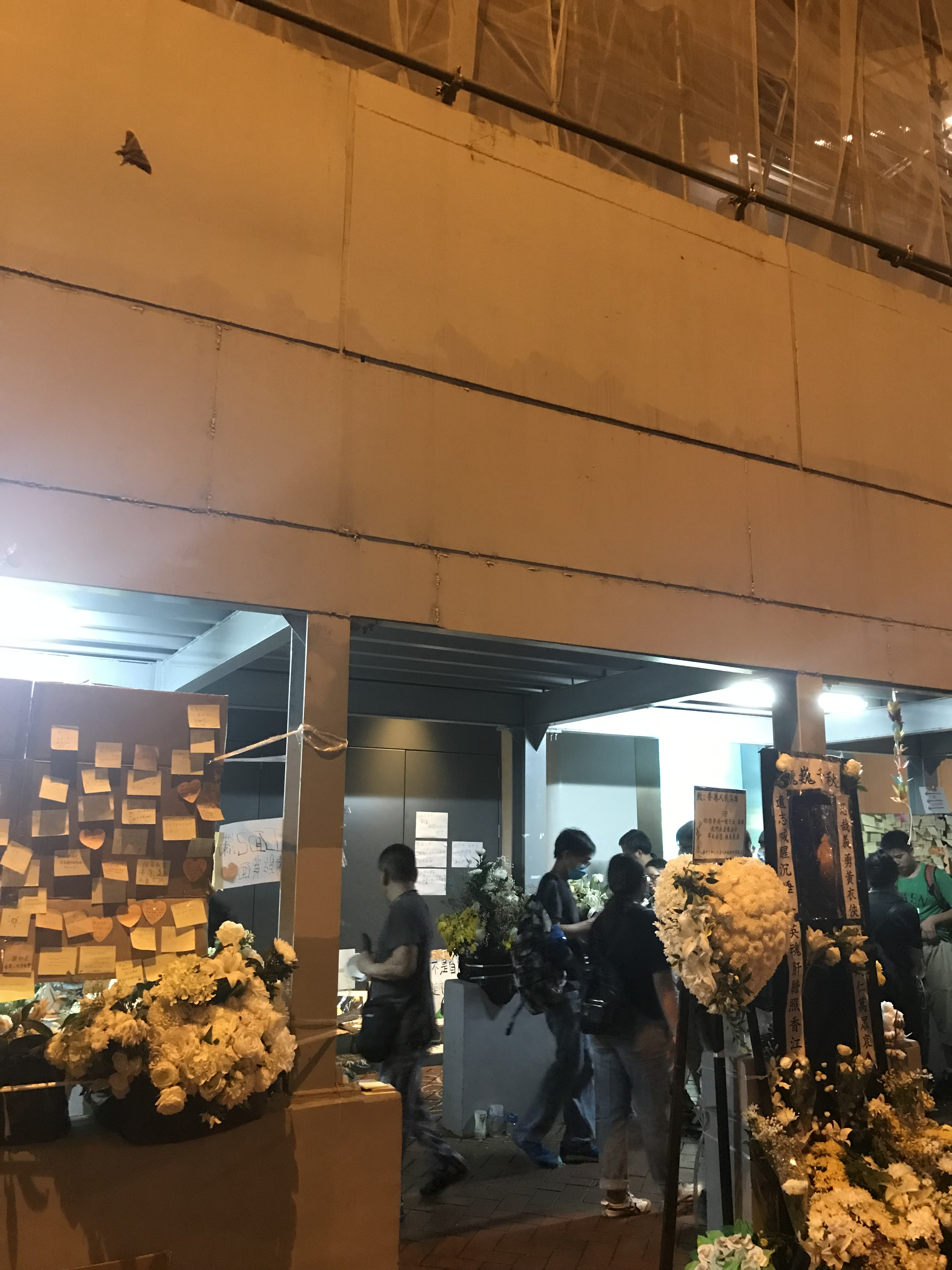
On the night of the seven-day ritual for Leung Ling-kit, a giant moth appeared, leading some media to speculate that it was a reincarnation of the deceased.

On June 21, the seventh day after Leung Ling-kit’s death, crowds gathered at the scene of the incident at Taikoo Place to lay flowers and pay their respects. The queue of citizens waiting to burn incense stretched to the High Court, and some played the hymn "Amazing Grace" on flutes in remembrance. In the evening, citizens held a ritual to send off the spirits, with nearly a thousand people gathering on Harcourt Road outside Taikoo Place. On the same day, since the government did not respond to the protesters’ demands by the deadline, a group of creators released an animated short film calling on protesters to "not retreat or disperse," ending with an image of Leung Ling-kit's back in a yellow raincoat, reiterating the five demands.

On June 29, singer Denise Ho attended the 30th Golden Melody Awards in Taipei. While walking the red carpet with the band CHTHONIC, she wore a bright yellow coat in memory of Leung Ling-kit.

On July 11, Leung Ling-kit's family set up a memorial for him at the Hong Kong Funeral Home in North Point. They agreed to hold a public memorial service at the nearby Java Road Playground with the assistance of the funeral committee, which included Reverend Yuen Tin-Yau, Associate Professor of Political Science and Administration at the Chinese University of Hong Kong, Chow Po Chung, and clinical psychologist Dr. James Ye. The 612 Humanitarian Relief Fund Secretariat helped organize the event. Despite the rain, hundreds of people queued to enter the playground for the memorial ceremony. Citizens laid sunflowers, sang "Sing Hallelujah to the Lord," and bowed three times to the front stage inscribed with "Forever Remembered." Hong Kong legislators Cheung Chiu-hung, Hui Chi-fung, Eddie Chu, Raymond Chan, Au Nok-hin, Tanya Chan, Alvin Yeung, and singer Denise Ho attended, and actress Deanie Ip paid her respects to Leung after attending the funeral of Hung Jin Mui at the same venue. At the farewell ceremony, Leung Ling-kit's parents thanked the kind-hearted people of Hong Kong:

"Thank you to everyone from all walks of life for mourning our son. Every kind-hearted Hong Konger, including our son, hopes that Hong Kong can become a better place where everyone can live and work in peace and speak freely. Every brave citizen who takes to the streets does so out of love for Hong Kong. Young people should take good care of themselves and live on, so they can continue to speak out against injustice and unfairness in society." — Leung Ling-kit's parents

On August 11, a Taiwanese civil group and Hongkongers in Taiwan held a human chain event at the Central Culture Park in Taipei to support Hong Kong, incorporating the "yellow raincoat man" symbol in memory of Leung Ling-kit.

On December 15, the half-year anniversary of Leung Ling-kit’s death, netizens held a memorial service outside Taikoo Place in the evening. Over a thousand people queued to mourn, bowed their heads in silence, laid flowers, lit candles, and shone their phone lights. The line extended to the pedestrian road outside the Government Headquarters. On the same day, Hongkongers in Japan organized a "Hong Kong Human Rights Act" march in Tokyo. Before the march, they held a moment of silence for Leung Ling-kit. Participants included not only Hongkongers but also Japanese, Taiwanese living in Japan, and Chinese tourists.

On December 17, a civil group in Vancouver, Canada held an event and a memorial for Leung Ling-kit, displaying a yellow raincoat and placing white flower bouquets from volunteers.

=== 2020 ===
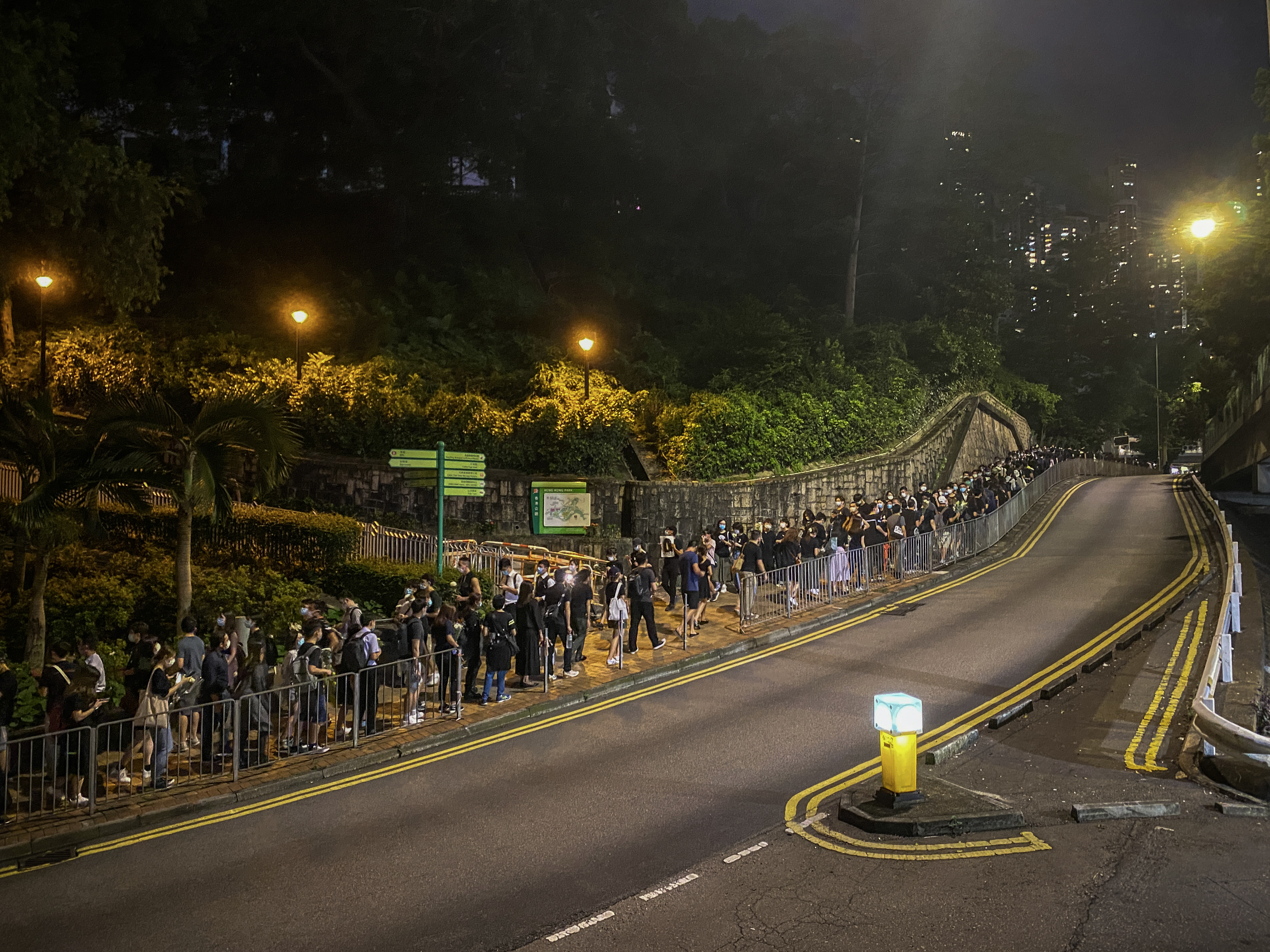
On the night of June 15, 2020, a large number of citizens queued to mourn in Admiralty, with the line extending to Garden Road in Central.

On March 7, 2020, the day of Leung Ling-kit’s birthday, netizens organized a memorial event. About 150 people laid flowers, lit candles, chanted slogans, and sang "Glory to Hong Kong" on the pedestrian road outside Taikoo Place. Similar memorial events were held on April 15, the ten-month anniversary of Leung Ling-kit’s death, but due to the social distancing order, participants had to maintain distance, and some were stopped and searched by the police.

On June 15, 2020, the first anniversary of Leung Ling-kit’s death, citizens held a memorial service outside Taikoo Place. From 5 PM, people laid flowers in remembrance, and dozens of riot police arrived, checking and filming the attendees. Police instructed people not to stay and urged them to disperse, leading to arguments with citizens. By evening, the queue of people coming to pay respects grew longer, stretching from the High Court to the Cheung Kong Center, with the end of the line near the Peak Tram Station on Garden Road in Central. Some citizens placed multiple light box tombstones by the grass, displaying messages like "One Country, Two Systems is Dead" and commemorating those who died during the anti-extradition bill protests.

At least 200 people gathered in the mall's atrium, waving protest flags, chanting slogans related to Hong Kong independence, and holding up their phone lights. The police posted twice on their official Facebook page, stating that crowds were gathering and shouting at Taikoo Place, possibly violating the ban on unauthorized assembly and group gatherings, and they would take appropriate action if necessary, enforcing the law decisively. At 11:17 PM, riot police arrived in a police vehicle, broadcasting warnings for the crowd to leave. Legislator Hui Chi-fung negotiated with the riot police, who then returned to their vehicle. Ten minutes later, a large number of riot police advanced from Taikoo Place towards the High Court, banging their shields and instructing journalists to move forward. A citizen waiting at a bus stop shouted, "Waiting for the bus," but was yelled at by the police, "Shut up! You had plenty of time to leave! Stop fooling around here!".

Netizens also organized memorial services at Tuen Mun Station near the entrance to Tuen Mun Park and at the ground level of Yuen Long Station, setting up altars for citizens to lay flowers. About 200 people in black shirts attended the Tuen Mun service, while district councillors held memorial services in Causeway Bay and Tin Shui Wai.

=== 2021 ===
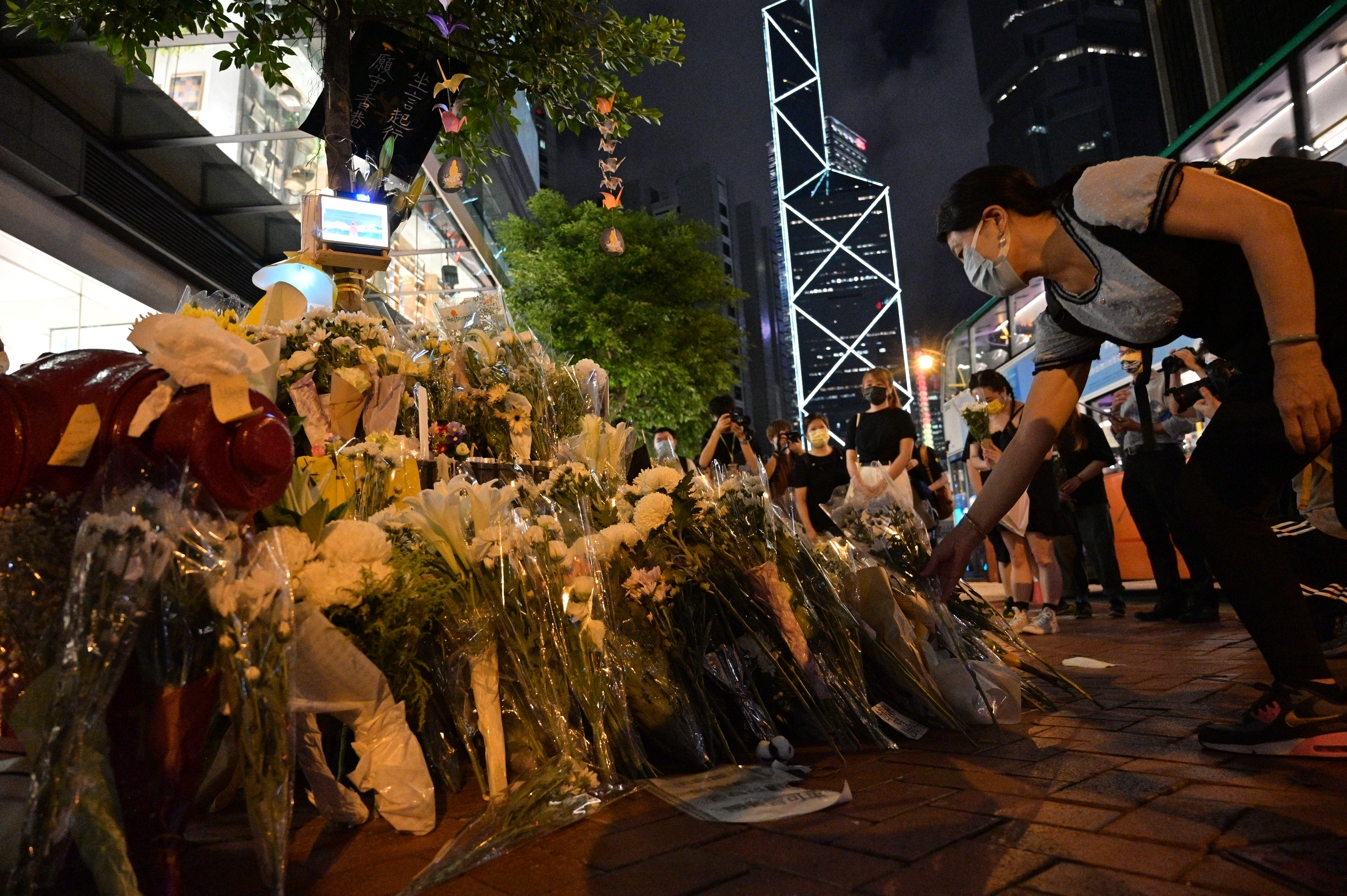
Citizens lay flowers outside Taikoo Place in Pacific Place.

On June 15, 2021, the second anniversary of Leung Ling-kit’s death, members of the group "Start Stand" distributed white ribbons on the pedestrian bridge outside Hung Hom station in the morning, working in groups of two to three. However, while packing up their supplies, they were suddenly surrounded by police, who accused them of violating the social gathering ban, and six members were issued fines. Yau Tsim Mong District Councillor Derek Chu Kong-wai also distributed white ribbons in Mong Kok in the morning and was briefly surrounded by police cordons.

In the afternoon, citizens began arriving outside Taikoo Place in Admiralty to lay white flowers. From 5 PM, over 20 police officers arrived to monitor the area, setting up orange tape to create barriers. Police checked some of the people present and repeatedly urged them to leave. Around 7 PM, after some people chanted "Liberate Hong Kong, Revolution of Our Times" inside the mall, over 20 police officers entered the mall around 8 PM to monitor and check citizens, but no one was arrested. The memorial site featured not only flowers but also heartfelt cards, electronic candles, and paper cranes. The flower bed displayed messages like "Forever Remembered" and "He was pushed down by the regime." One citizen attending the memorial said it was impossible to forget the event.

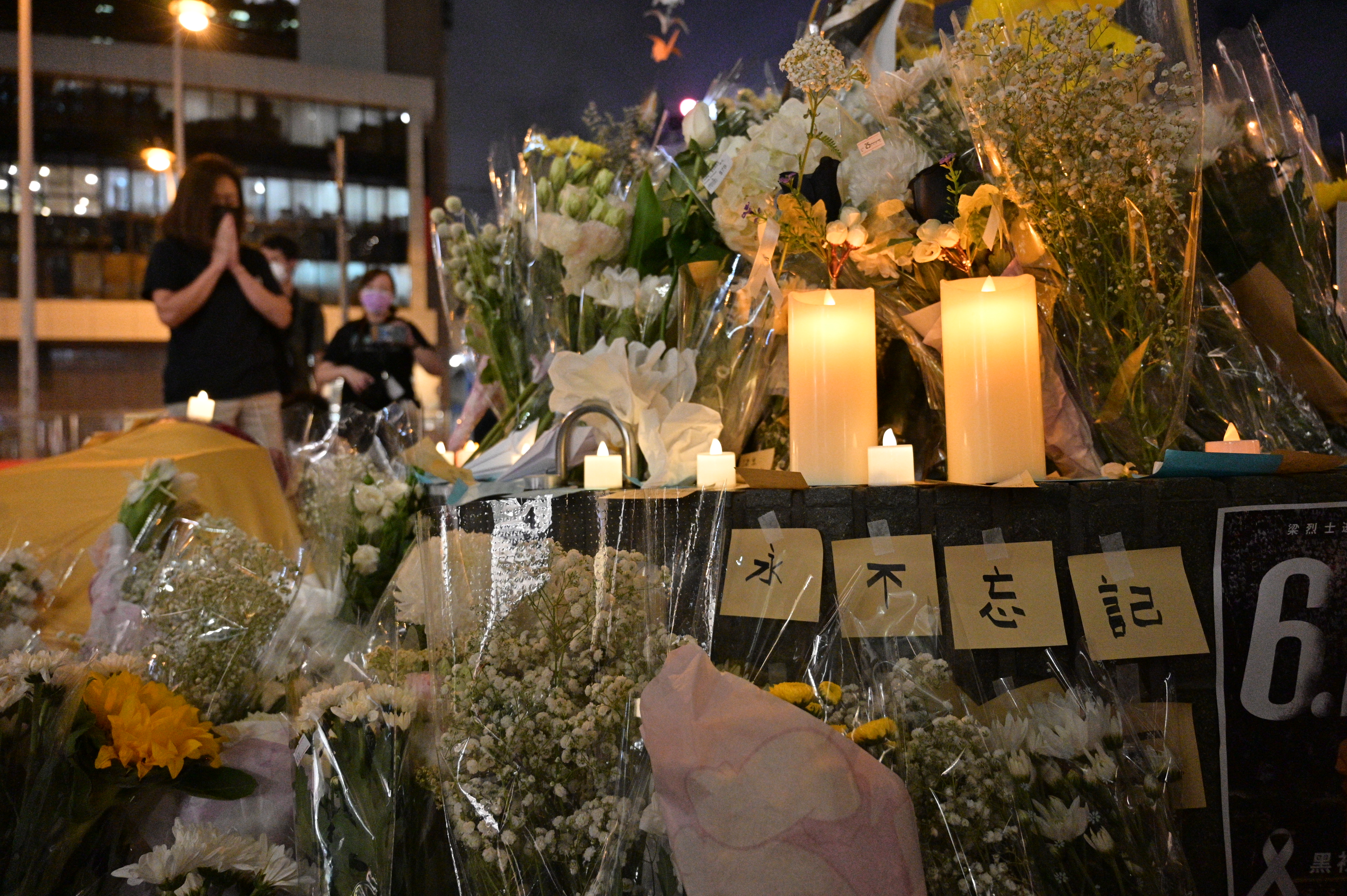
At the memorial site’s "flowerbed," some people placed heartfelt cards, electronic candles, and paper cranes.

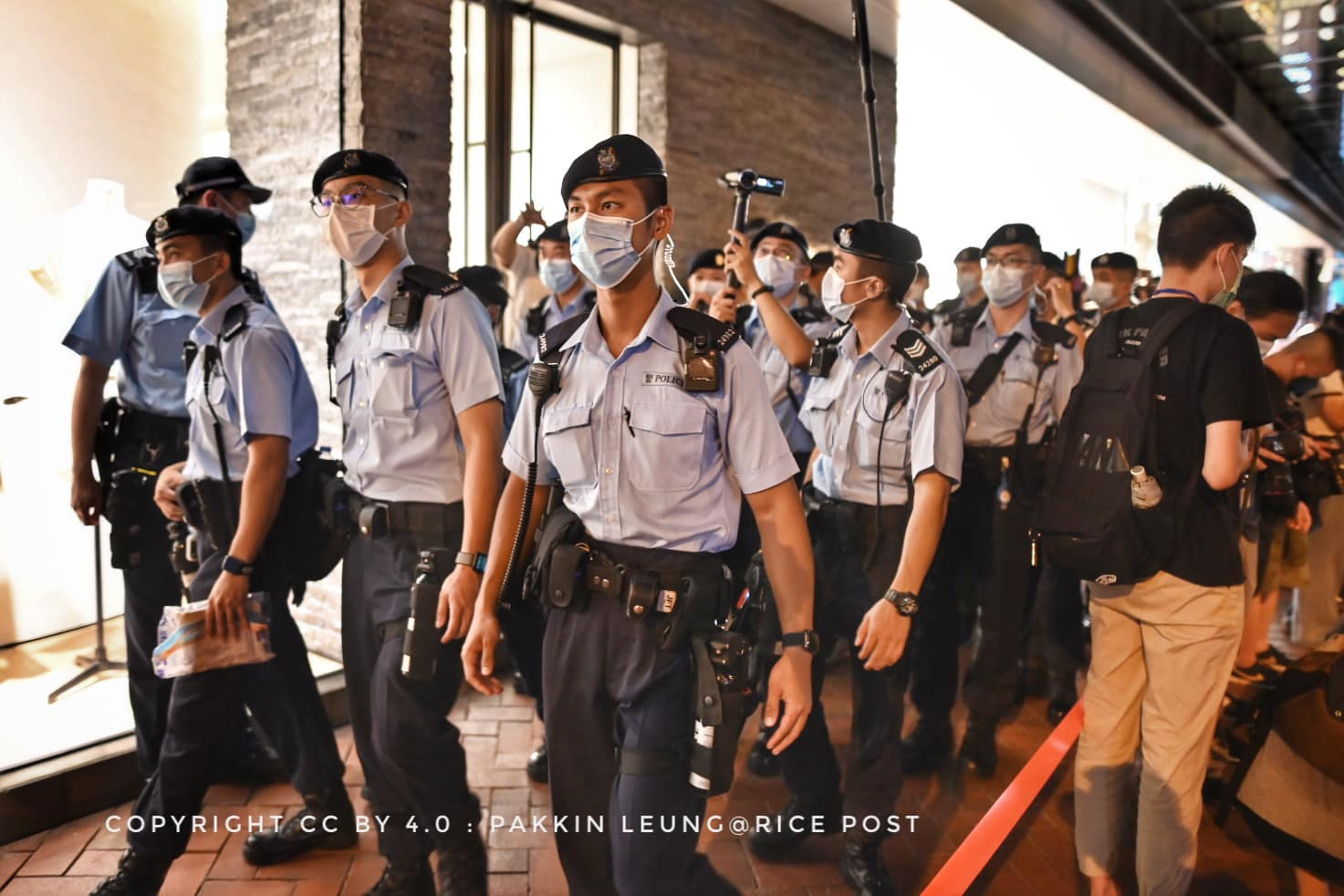
Police officers patrolled the memorial site multiple times.

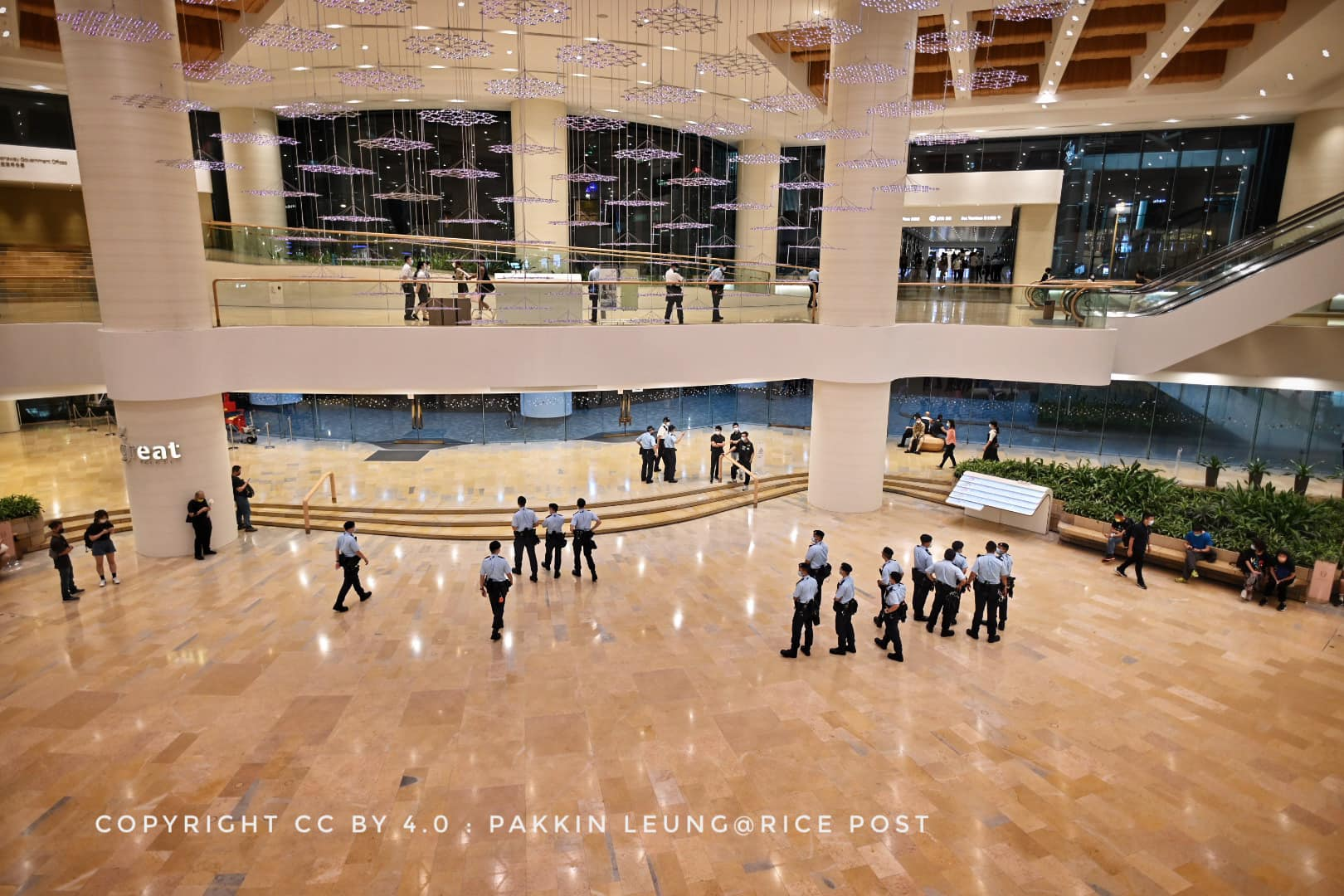
Around 8 p.m., over 20 police officers entered the Taikoo Place shopping mall.

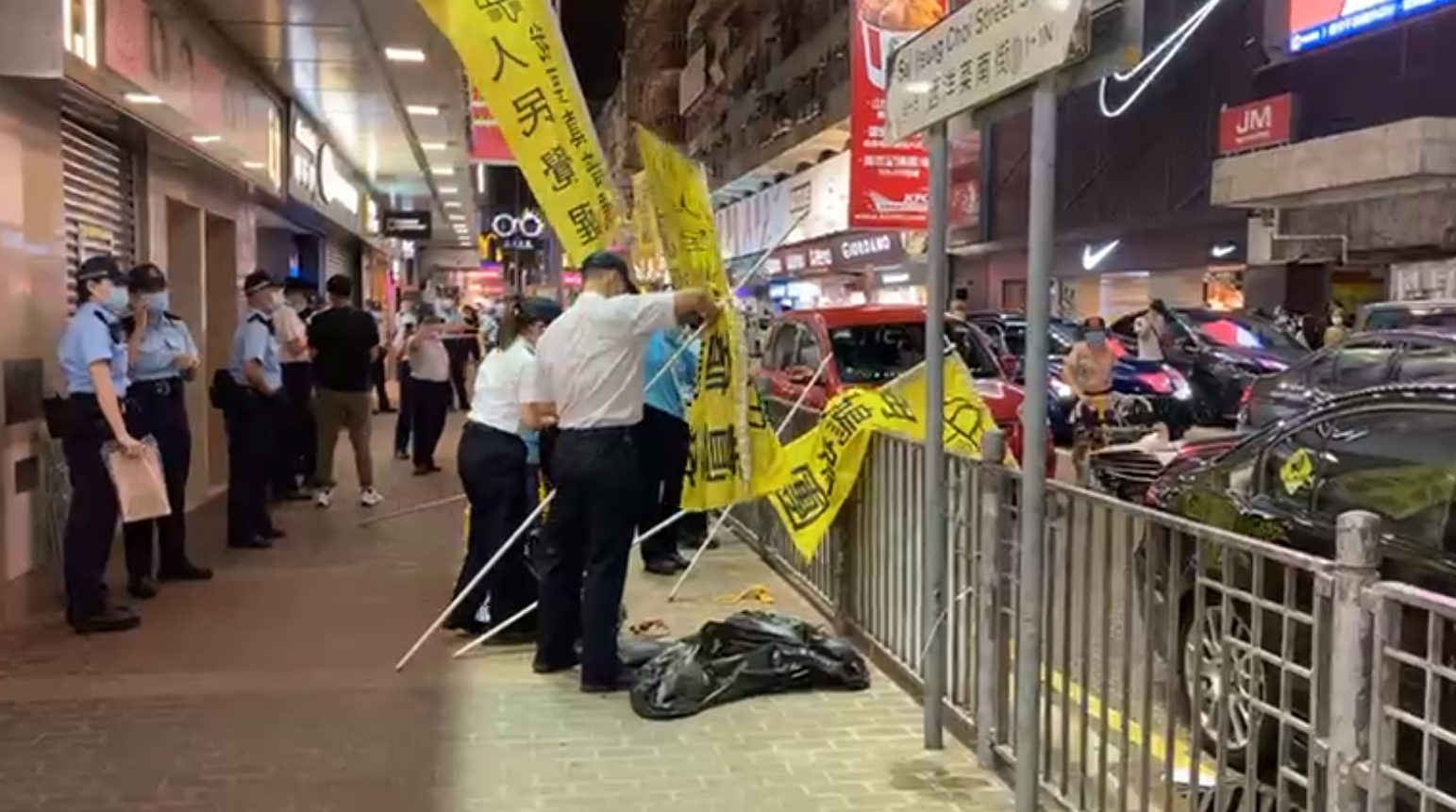
In Mong Kok, some supplies were cleared away by the Food and Environmental Hygiene Department.

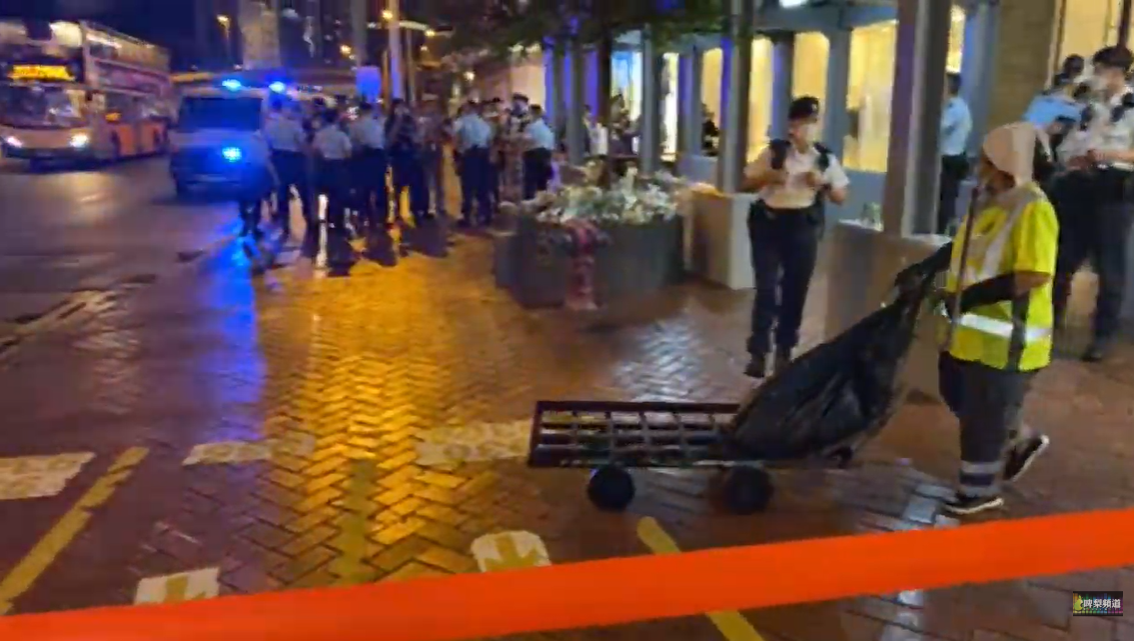
Police officers cordoned off the flower tribute area and dispatched cleaners for cleanup.

=== 2022 ===
On June 15, 2022, the third anniversary of Marco Leung Ling-kit’s death, over 20 citizens braved the rain to pay their respects outside Pacific Place. Police officers subsequently cordoned off the area and conducted checks on the citizens, warning those who left flowers about “littering” and recording their ID card details.

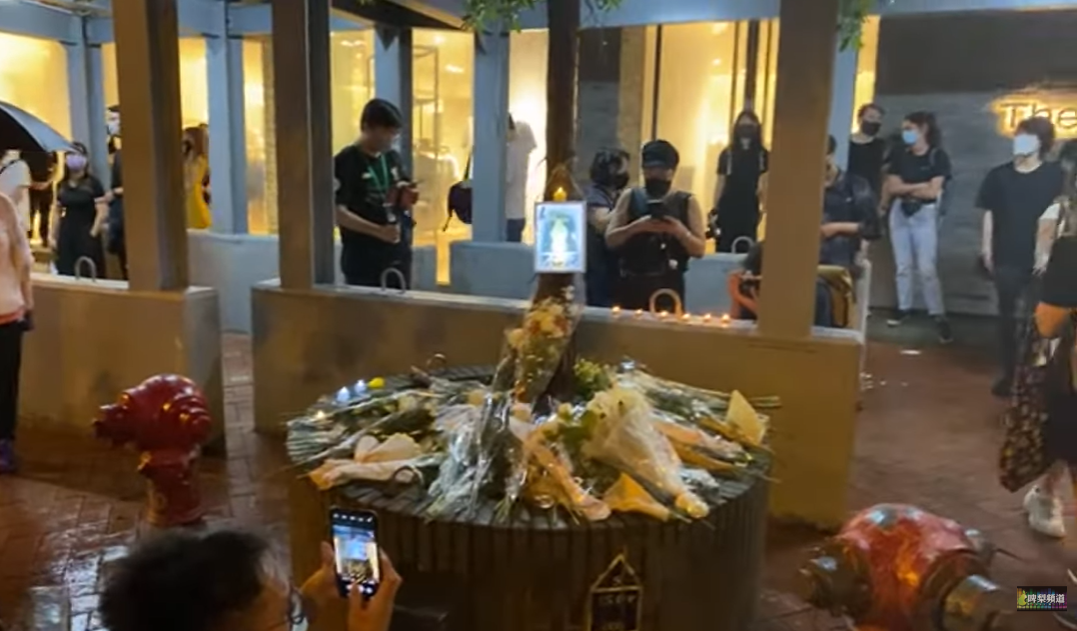
Citizens placed flowers in the flower bed to pay tribute.

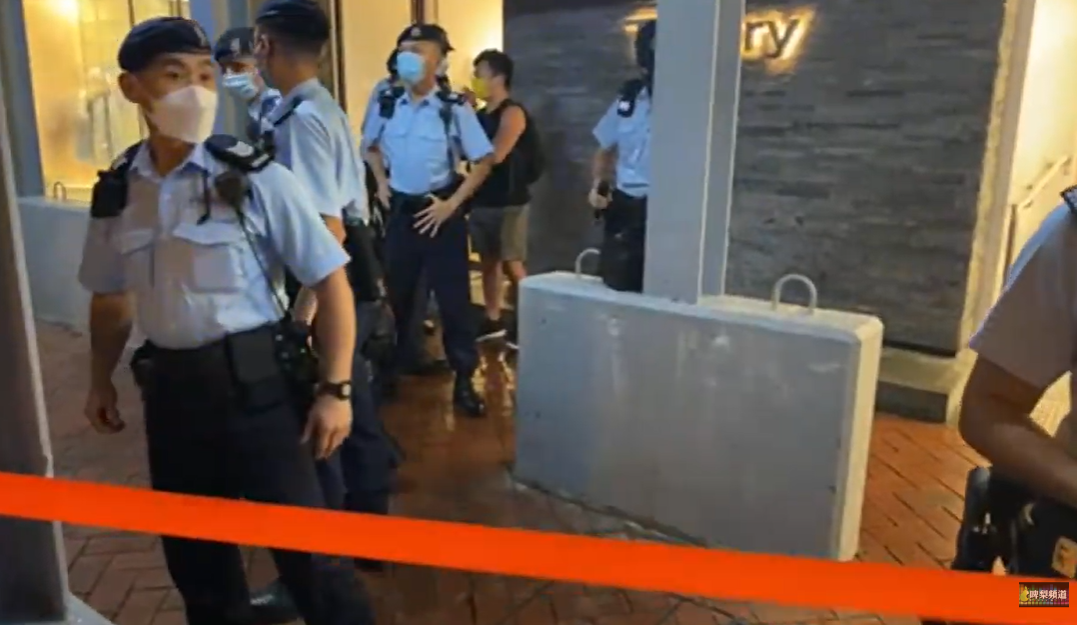
Police cordoned off the area with orange tape and conducted checks on the citizens.

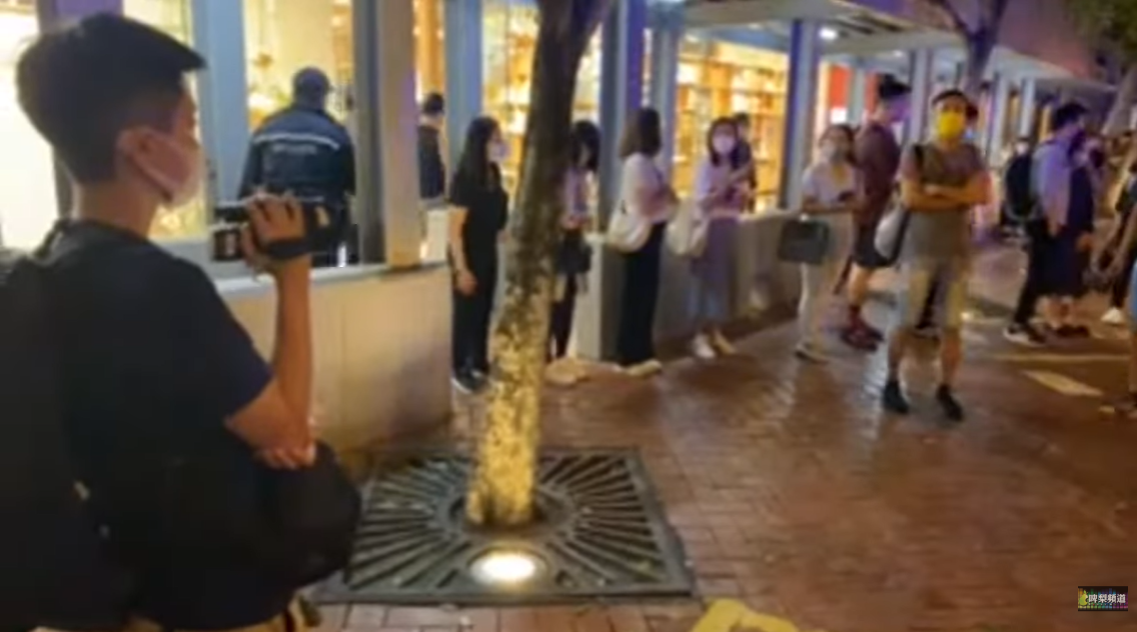
Police officers used cameras to film citizens waiting at the bus stop.

=== 2023 ===
On June 15, 2023, the fourth anniversary of Marco Leung Ling-kit’s death, citizens came to the scene to lay flowers in the evening, but were warned by police that they would be fined for littering. Consequently, after placing flowers for a brief moment, they had to take them away. One person who refused to remove the flowers after placing them was fined HKD 1,500 for littering. During the tribute, "Granny Wong" Wong Fung-yiu, wearing a yellow raincoat, bowed her head in mourning at the flower bed while nearly 20 plainclothes and uniformed police officers monitored the area.

== Social reactions ==
=== Commentaries ===
Pazu, a columnist for Stand News, argued that Marco Leung’s last wishes were clear and concise, attributing his death not to any psychological or mental illness but to a "protest with his life." Pazu suggested that the cause of death should not be classified as "suicide" as stated by the police but rather as "sacrifice." Professor Chen Ruoshui of the Department of History at National Taiwan University, in a reader's submission to Stand News, referred to Marco Leung as the first protester to be honored with the title of "martyr." An article in the Allgemeine Zeitung listed the five demands on Marco Leung’s banner, calling it the first case in history of someone committing suicide to defend Hong Kong’s freedom.

Apple Daily commentator Fung Hei-kin noted that Marco Leung died defending the freedom of a city, even as an ideal, reflecting a "spirit of the times." Fung cited Pericles' "Funeral Oration" from Thucydides' History of the Peloponnesian War, suggesting that the passage starting with "The whole earth is the sepulcher of famous men" could serve as a eulogy for Leung.

Chow Kwun-wai, director of the short film "Self-immolator" in the movie Ten Years, said in an Apple Daily interview that he had gone to the altar at Pacific Place on June 16 to mourn Marco Leung. He remarked, "I never thought that the scenario in 'Self-immolator,' which imagines Hong Kong ten years later, would become reality in just four years."

Ng Kwai-lun, President of the Hong Kong Association of Thanatology, who restored Marco Leung's body, expressed in an interview that he felt "both respect and sorrow" for Leung’s act of using his death to protest the government's disregard for public opinion, adding that Leung had become "a symbol of Hong Kong."

=== Protesters ===
Yuen Long District Councillor Ng Kin-wai mentioned that Marco Leung Ling-kit’s death was a key reason for his decision to run in the 2019 Hong Kong District Council elections. Tony Chung, the convener of Studentlocalism, referred to Marco Leung when applying to the police for a march on June 16, 2020, stating one reason for the march was to "continue the will of Marco Leung and others who expressed their dissent to the government with their deaths on June 15 last year."

Citizen News interviewed a frontline protester who admitted he used to be an "apathetic Hong Konger" who didn’t participate in the anti-extradition bill protests on June 9 and 12. However, Marco Leung’s death on June 15 awakened him to the notion that his previous inaction was tantamount to supporting the government’s governance style. He felt the need to "come out and make a change," leading him to join the march on June 16 and subsequent anti-extradition bill activities. Another protester who witnessed Marco Leung's death said she once believed in peaceful protests as a means to change Hong Kong. However, Leung’s death profoundly impacted her, leading her to conclude that "if being labeled a rioter by the government is the only way to get them to respond to the people's demands, I don’t mind being labeled a rioter."

=== Pro-Beijing media and the Hong Kong government ===
Dot Dot News reported online rumors alleging that Marco Leung’s last contact was with Roy Kwong, claiming their conversation involved a bank transfer and that Kwong had advised Leung to "jump onto the air cushion for more media coverage." Kwong responded by calling Dot Dot News's behavior "despicable, shameless, and unethical," likening it to "treading on the deceased to make news." He demanded an immediate retraction and deletion of the report and reserved the right to take further action. Liberty Times verified that the report was no longer accessible on Dot Dot News' website and page on the same day.

A People’s Daily article from a WeChat account claimed that Marco Leung was "ideologically radical and impulsive," which led Roy Kwong to see him as an opportunity, giving him money to "carefully plan" the extreme protest. According to the article, Kwong, in his capacity as a legislator, staged a "dual performance" by arriving at the scene for a "rescue," suggesting that Leung was merely a "pawn" for Kwong.

Chief Executive Carrie Lam, when asked at a press conference whether she would resign over Marco Leung’s death, called for citizens to "express their views peacefully and rationally" and expressed deep sorrow for anyone harming themselves to make a point.

=== Counseling organizations ===
Several emotional counseling organizations urged the media and the public not to share Marco Leung’s will, to avoid glorifying suicide. The Samaritans in Hong Kong noted that over 30 cases were encountered during the memorial rally in Admiralty, with over 20% of those cases involving self-harm thoughts. Some individuals felt guilty for not doing enough, experiencing survivor's guilt. A counselor named Wai stated, "In many years of counseling, I have never seen such a situation triggered by a large-scale social event."

=== Police report ===
On February 26, 2021, a pre-inquest review was held regarding Marco Leung’s case. A 12-day inquest began on May 10.

Judge Ko Wai-hung instructed the jury to determine the cause of death based on the balance of probabilities. If the jury believed Marco Leung intended to end his life, they could return a verdict of "suicide." If they thought Leung was aware of the rescue cushion below and estimated he would fall onto it but ultimately failed due to a misjudgment, they could conclude "death by misadventure." If the jury ruled out suicide and misadventure, considering other reasons such as physical exhaustion or inability to grasp the scaffolding in time, they could return a verdict of "accident." On May 25, the jury concluded he died by misadventure. The term "misadventure" in Hong Kong law, translated as "death by misadventure" in Chinese, does not mean "unlucky," but rather that the deceased encountered an unforeseen death resulting from another person's lawful actions.

== See also ==
- Mohamed Bouazizi
- Jan Palach
- 2019–2020 Hong Kong protests
- Structural violence
