= Central and Western District =

District of Hong Kong

Central and Western 中西區
- District
- Central and Western District
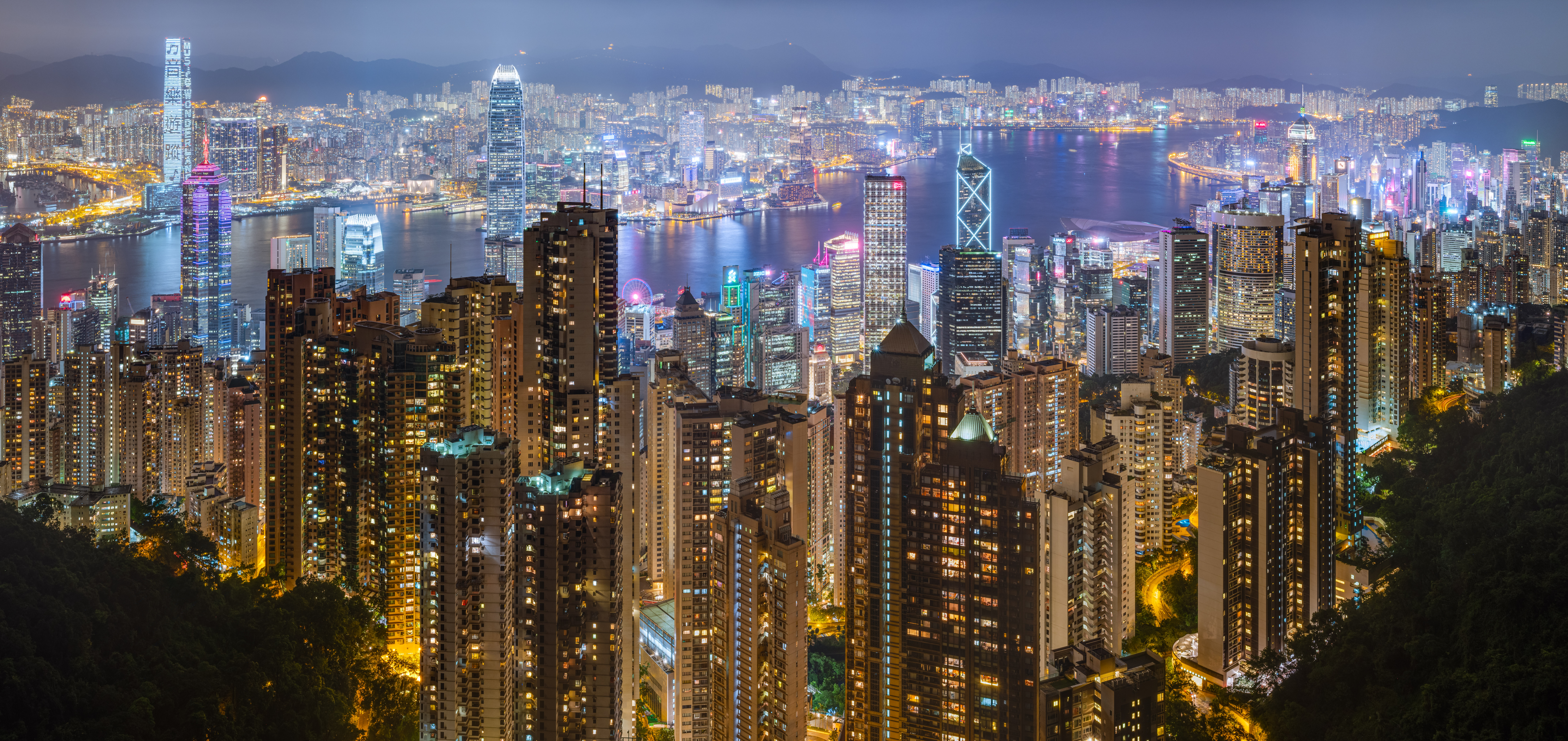
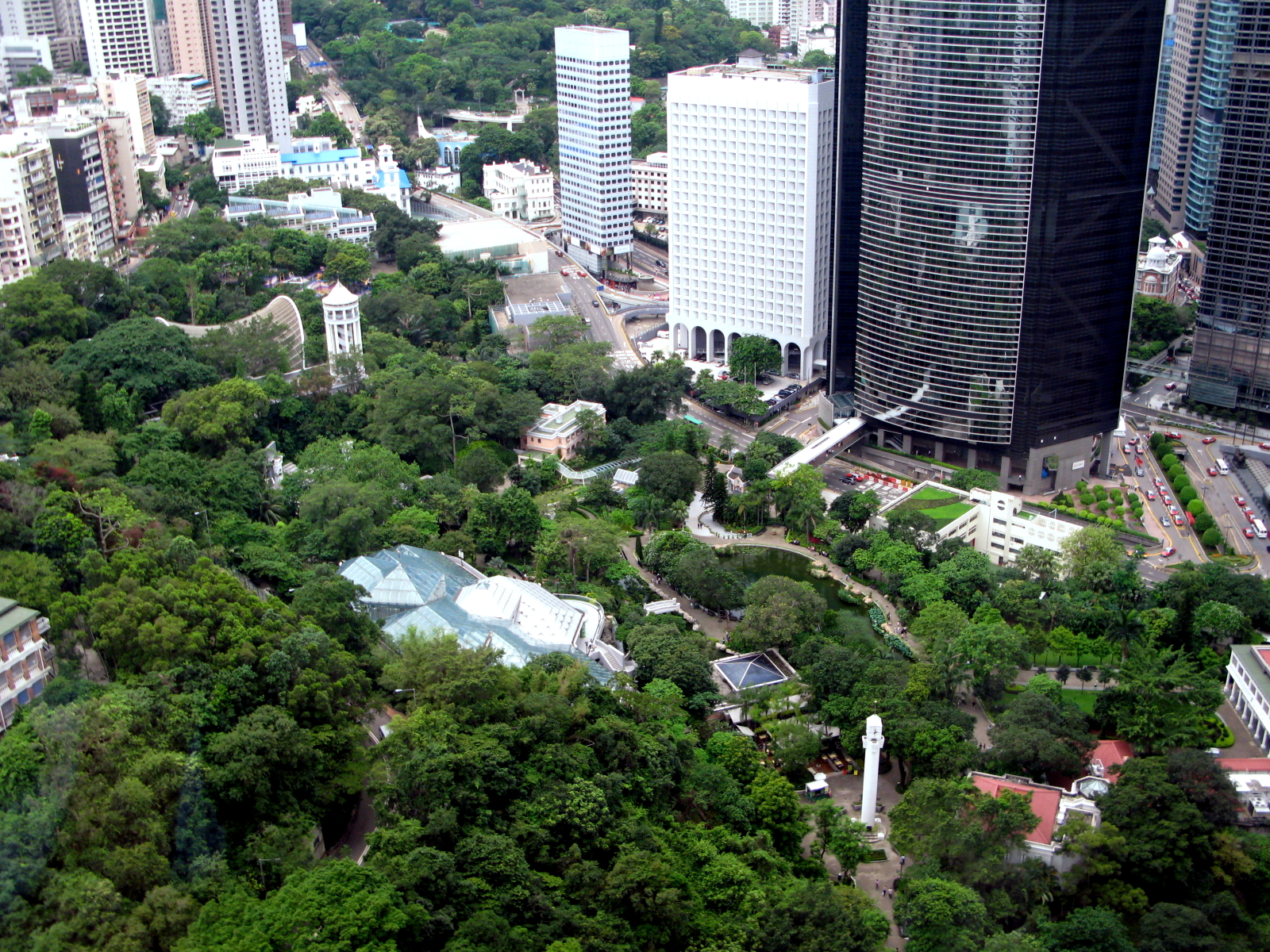
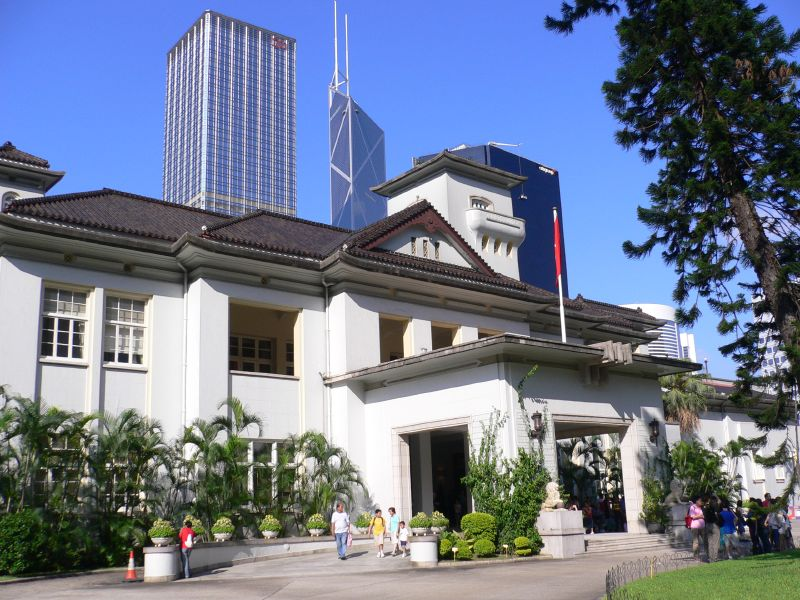
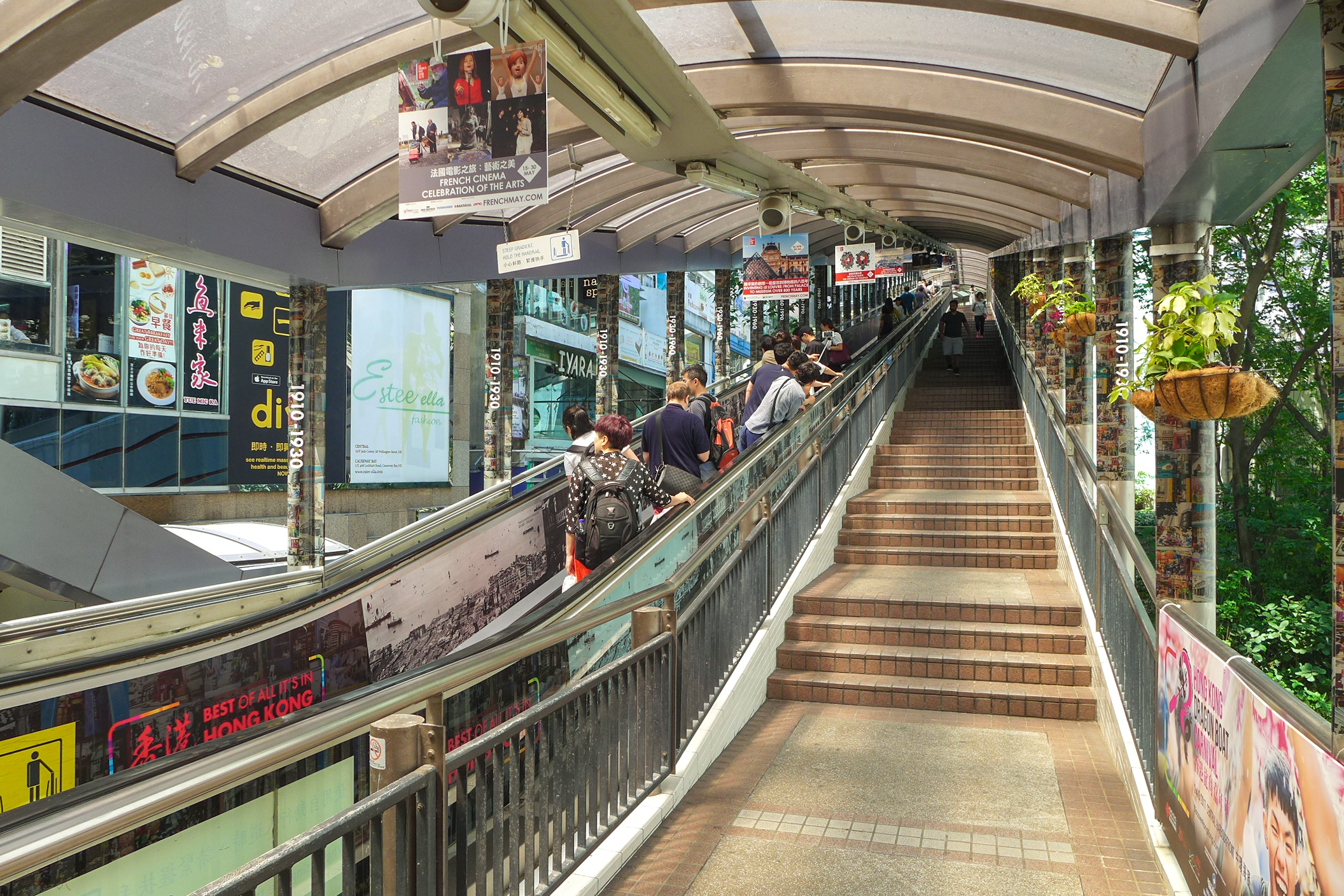
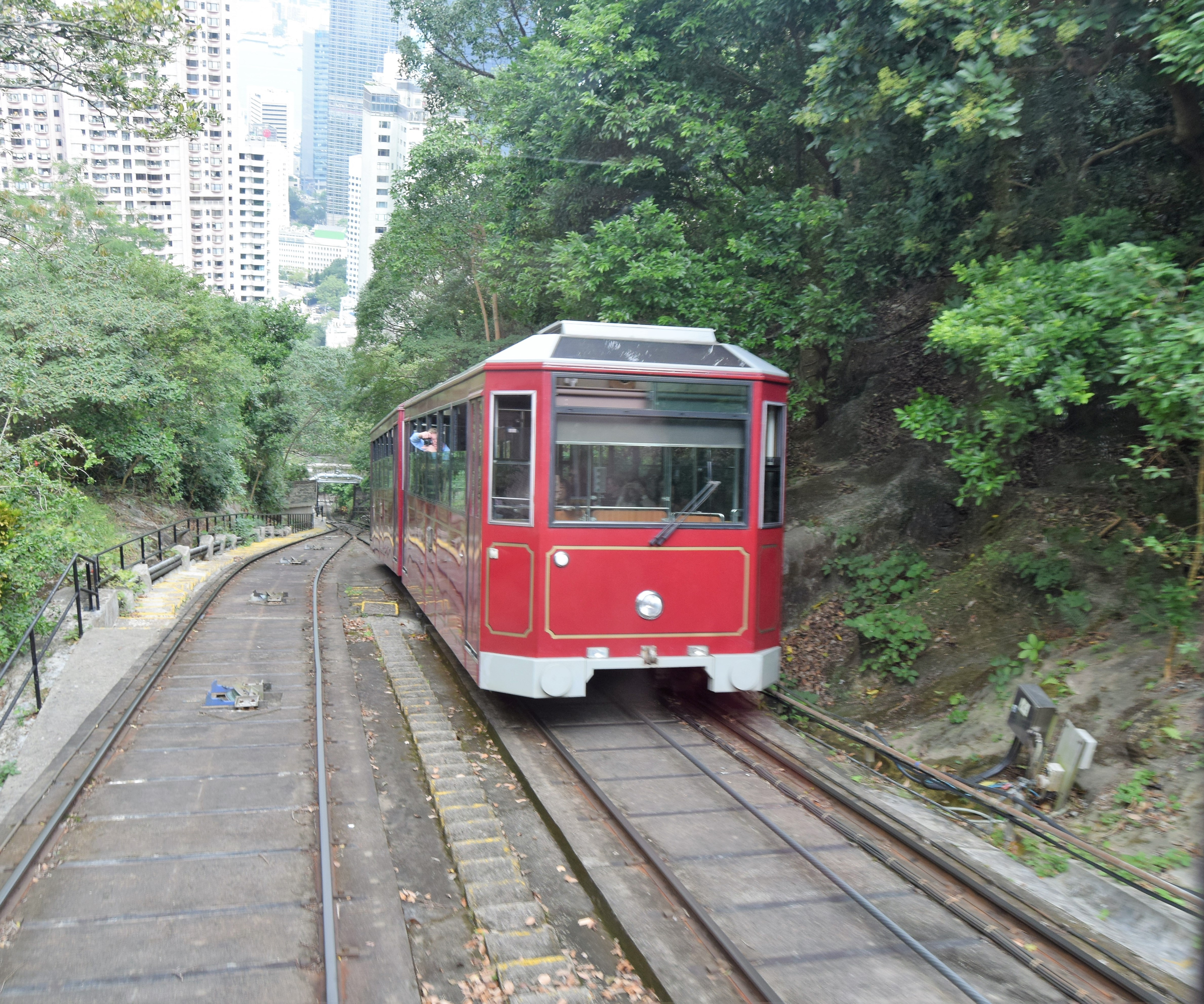
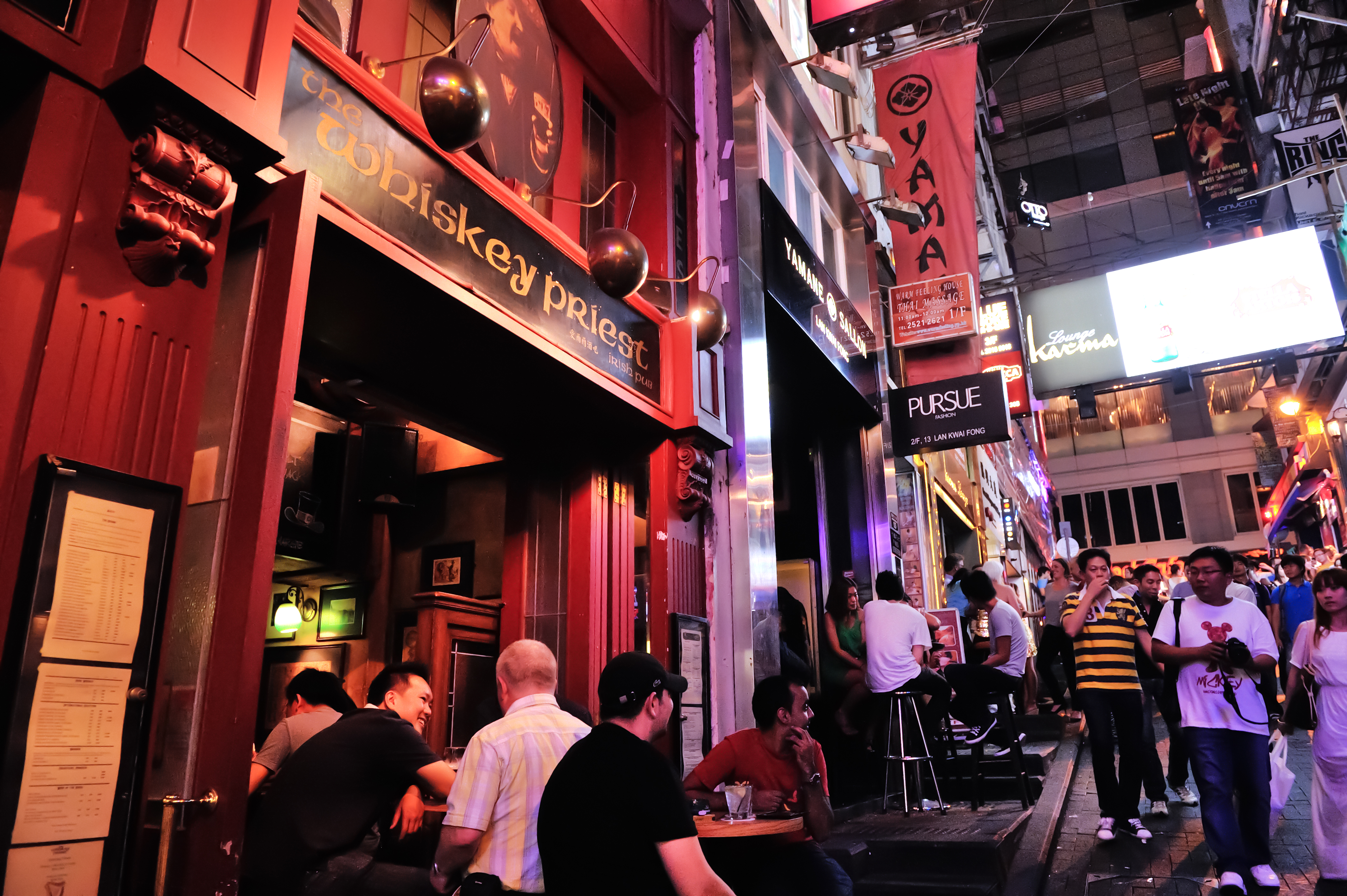
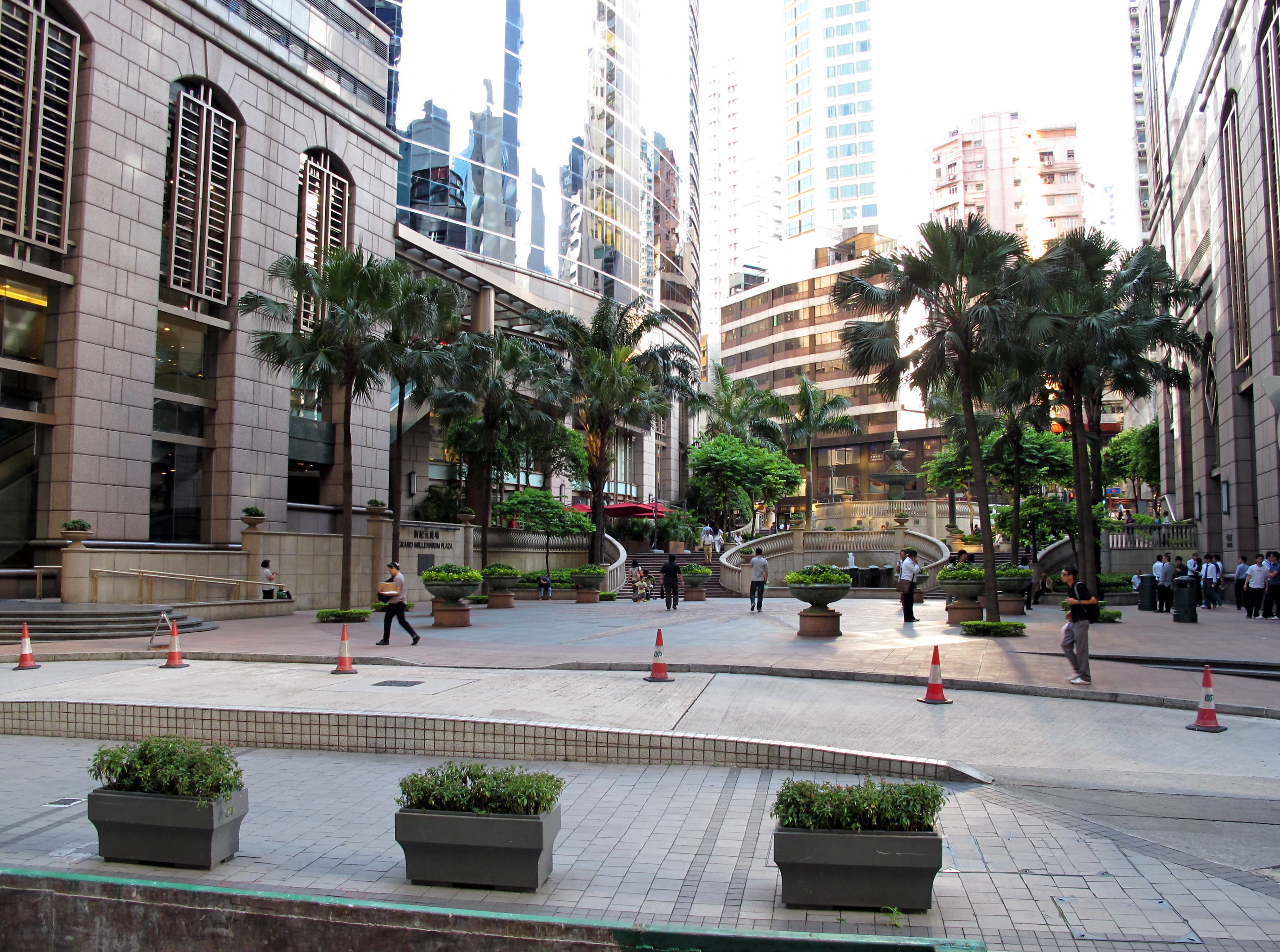
- Skyline of Central and Victoria Harbour viewed from Victoria Peak Hong Kong Park Government House Central-Mid Levels Escalator Peak Tram Lan Kwai Fong Millennium Plaza in Sheung Wan
- Interactive map of Central and Western
- Coordinates: 22°17′12″N 114°09′18″E
- Country: China
- Special Administrative Region: Hong Kong
- Region: Hong Kong Island
- District Council constituencies: 2

Government
  - District Officer: David Leung Chi-Ki
  - District Council Chairman: David Leung Chi-ki (ex-officio)
  - District Council Vice-Chairman: Victor Yeung Sui-Yin

Area
  - Total: 12.55 km^{2} (4.85 sq mi)
  - Land: 12.55 km^{2} (4.85 sq mi)
- Lands Department

Population (2021)
  - Total: 235,953: 77% Chinese; 7.6% Filipino; 5.8% White
  - Density: 18,800/km^{2} (48,690/sq mi)
- Census and Statistics Department
- Time zone: UTC+8 (Hong Kong Time)
- Largest neighbourhood by population: Kennedy Town (62,272 – 2016 est)
- Website: Central and Western District

Central and Western District
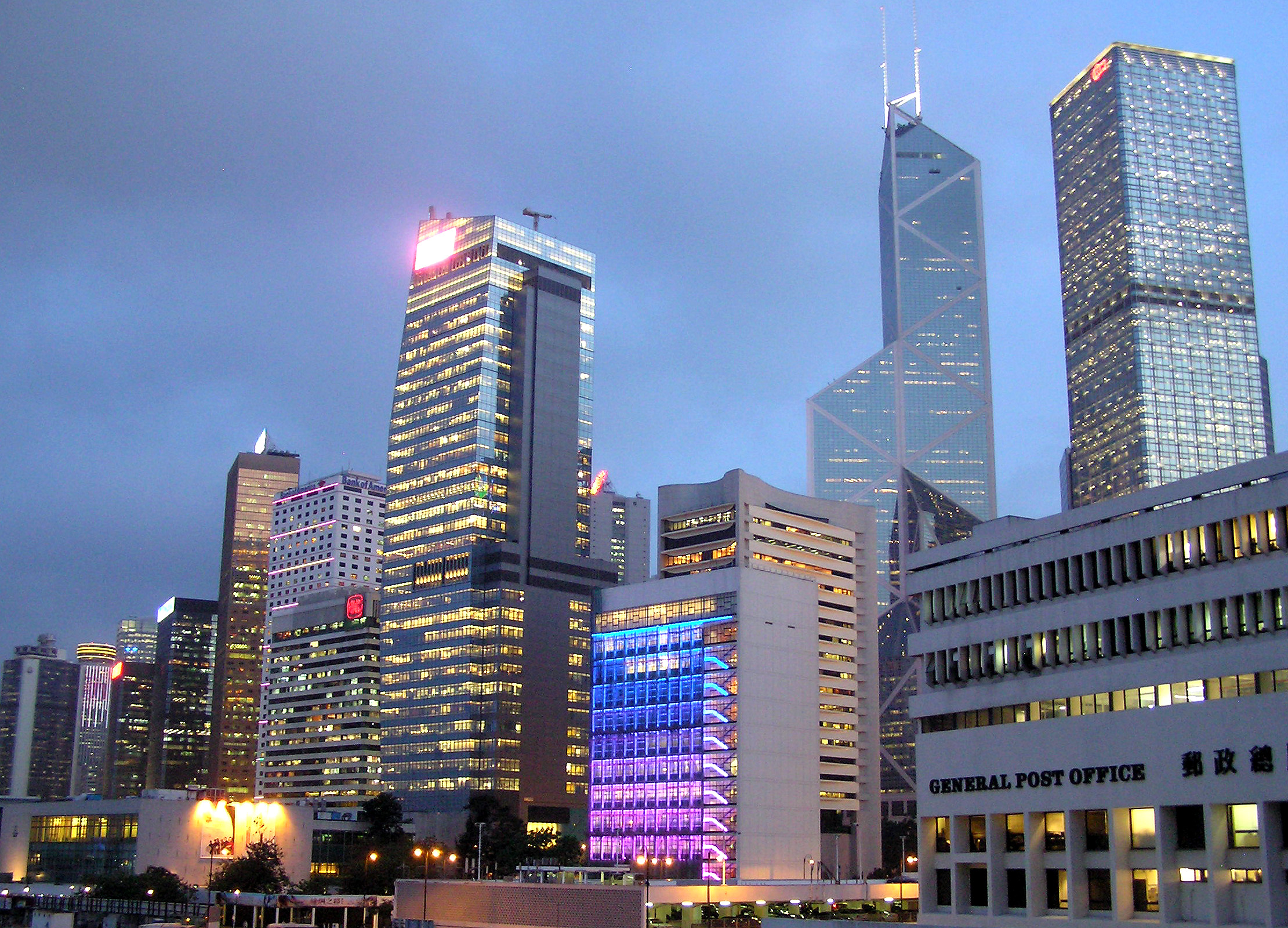
- Central, Hong Kong
- Traditional Chinese: 中西區
- Simplified Chinese: 中西区
- Cantonese Yale: Jūngsāi Kēui
- Jyutping: zung^{1} sai^{1} keoi^{1}
- Literal meaning: Central Western District
Transcriptions
Standard Mandarin
- Hanyu Pinyin: Zhōngxī Qū
Wu
- Wugniu: tson^{1} si^{1} chiu^{1}
- IPA: Shanghainese: [tsoŋ˥ ɕi˧ tɕʰy˨]
Yue: Cantonese
- Yale Romanization: Jūngsāi Kēui
- Jyutping: zung^{1} sai^{1} keoi^{1}
- IPA: [tsʊŋ˥.sɐj˥ kʰɵɥ˥]

The Central and Western District is one of the 18 administrative districts of Hong Kong, located on the northwestern part of Hong Kong Island. It had a population of 243,266 in 2016. The district has the most educated residents with the highest income (median monthly household income; 2025), and the third lowest population due to its relatively small size.

Central is the central business district and the core urban area of Hong Kong. Western District covers Shek Tong Tsui, Kennedy Town, Sai Ying Pun, parts of Lung Fu Shan. Most of the districts lie within the statutory limits of the City of Victoria, the earliest urban settlement in colonial Hong Kong, except the far western end of the district, i.e. Victoria Road, Mount Davis and areas above the 700-feet contour, aka. the Peak.

== History ==
Central District, as Victoria City, was the first area of planned urban development in Hong Kong during the colonial era. The British held a land sale in June 1841, six months after the flag was raised at Possession Point. A total of 51 lots of land were sold to 23 merchant houses to build offices and warehouses. The property buyers included Dent's, Jardine's, Russell's and Olyphant's. At the time, the two roads Albany Nullah (now Garden Road) and Glenealy Nullah (now Glenealy) were mainly used by the British. The streets later became known as Government Hill.

In 1857, the British government expanded Victoria City and divided it into seven districts. Those located in present-day Central and Western are: Sai Ying Pun, Sheung Wan, Tai Ping Shan, Central. The area was essentially a European area until 1860 when Chinese merchants begin buying up European properties around Cochrane, Wellington and Pottinger Streets. The Central district was the principal European business district, hence the arrival of the first major bank HSBC. The Western district was the commercial centre for Chinese businesses. When property values in the district rose, a meeting was held in February 1866 to establish a "District Watch Force" to police and protect this specific area.

In 1880, Shek Tong Tsui was established, followed by Kennedy Town in the early 20th century. By the 1890s the majority of Hong Kong's population was concentrated in the district with about 200,000 residents, mostly in Victoria City.

== Politics ==
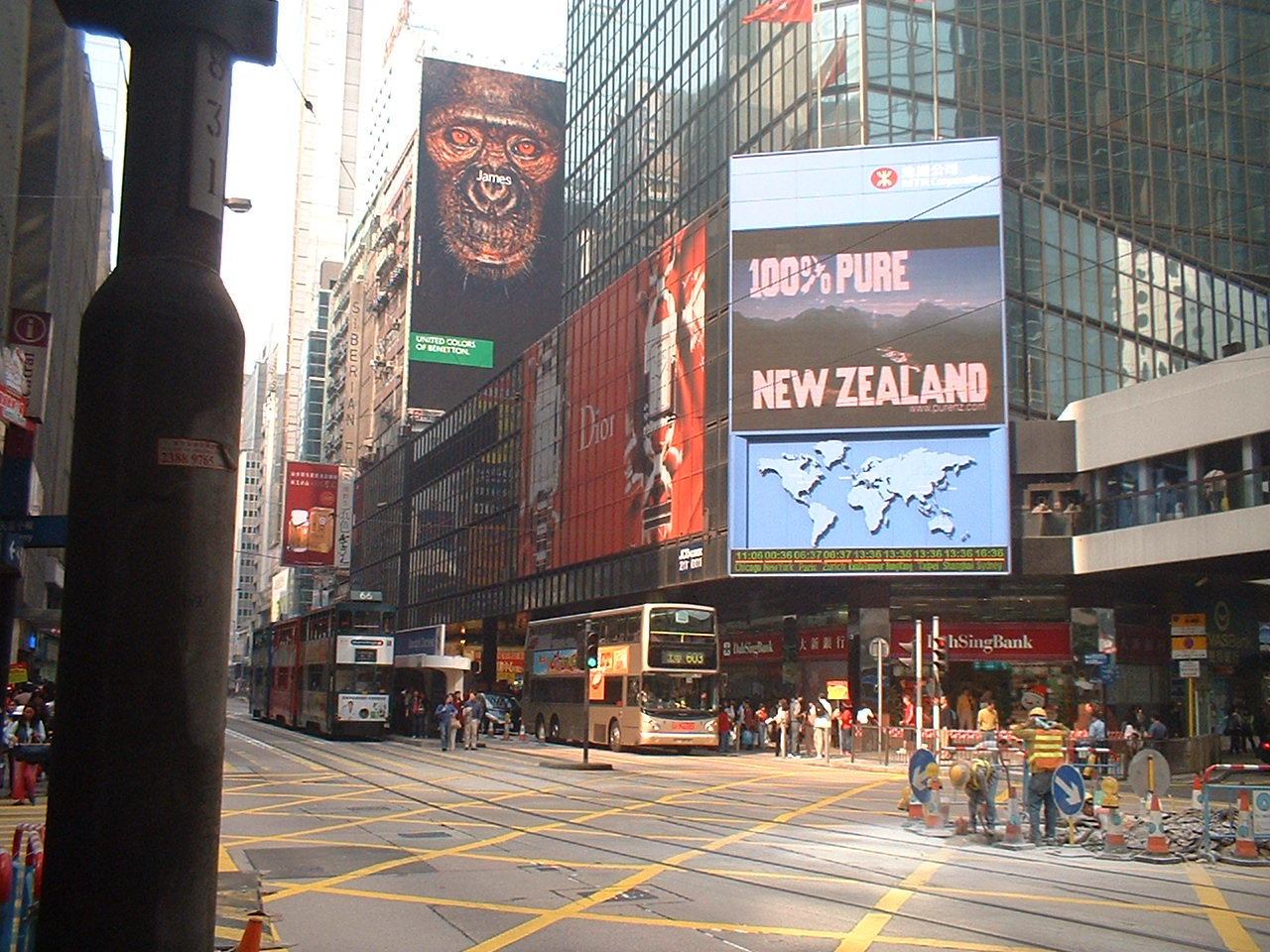
Corner of Pedder Street and Des Voeux Road Central, in Central.

District councils in Hong Kong are primarily consultative bodies of the HKSAR government with very limited powers, primarily restricted to building and maintaining parks, open areas, recreational and cultural activities and tourist promotion. The corresponding body for the district is Central and Western District Council.

District council elections are held every four years; the last one was held on 10 December 2023, for terms beginning 1 January 2024. The district was divided into two constituencies, each returning two members. Before 2023 the district comprised 15 single-member constituencies. The constituency areas were smaller than the commonly used geographic areas, which are in turn based on the old 1857 and 1880 divisions.

== Demographics ==
In Hong Kong's 2011 Census the district population was 251,519, down four percent from 261,884 in the 2001 census, and with an average of 2.7 people for each of the 89,529 households. Among the 18 districts, Central and Western has the second highest median household income in the territory (behind only Wan Chai District). In terms of average size of households, it is third smallest at 2.8 persons, behind only Wan Chai and Yau Tsim Mong District, at 2.7 each.

In 2021 census, the district population was slightly reduced to 235,953 .It has a relatively ethnically diverse population. As of 2021, 77% of the district's residents are Chinese, and the largest ethnic groups are Filipinos (7.6%) and white people (5.8%). 72% of the district's residents speak Cantonese as their primary language, while 14% use English and 3% use Mandarin.

== Geography and political subdivisions ==
The district is located at 22°17′00″N 114°09′00″E, based on the location of the General Post Office in Central. With an area of 12.4 km^{2} (4.8 sq mi), the district occupies the northwestern portion of Hong Kong Island. It is surrounded by Wan Chai District on the east, Southern District on the south, and Victoria Harbour in the north. The district also encompasses Green Island and Little Green Island, two uninhabited islands to the west of Hong Kong Island.

Areas from west to east along Victoria Harbour are: Kennedy Town, Sai Ying Pun, Sheung Wan, Central, Admiralty and other localities.

== Central ==
Central is the business centre of Hong Kong, and many multinational financial services corporations have their headquarters there. Government Hill, the site of the government headquarters, is also in Central.

=== Central mid-levels escalator ===
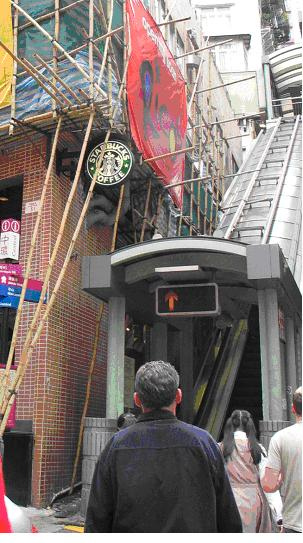
Central-Mid-Levels escalator, passing through SoHo at Elgin Street

The Central-Mid-Levels escalator in Hong Kong is the longest outdoor covered escalator system in the world. The system is 800 metres (2,600 ft) long, connecting Des Voeux Road Central, in Central with Conduit Road in the Mid-Levels, passing through narrow streets in SoHo.

The escalator runs downhill from 6 am to 10 am and uphill from 10:20 am to 12:00 am (midnight) every day. Apart from its significance in transport linkage, it is also a tourist attraction, with many restaurants, bars, and shops lining its route.

=== Bank of China Tower ===
The Bank of China Tower in Central houses the headquarters of BOCHK. Designed by I. M. Pei, the 70-storey building's height is 315 metres (1,033 ft) with two masts reaching 369 metres (1,211 ft). Construction began in 1985 and the building was completed in 1989. It was the first building outside the United States to exceed 1,000 feet (305 m) and to exceed 300 metres (984 ft). It was the tallest building in Hong Kong and Asia from 1989 to 1992, when the nearby, taller Central Plaza was completed.

=== City Hall ===
Built in 1962, the City Hall complex housed the old central library of Hong Kong, as well as concert halls, restaurants and a marriage registry. The conference room of the former Urban Council was also at the lower building of the City Hall.

The garden at the north-western side of the complex includes a memorial to those killed in Hong Kong during World War II.

=== Chinese People's Liberation Army Forces Hong Kong Building ===
The funnel-shaped Chinese People's Liberation Army Forces Hong Kong Building (formerly, and still commonly known as the Prince of Wales Building) housed the headquarters of the British garrison in Hong Kong until the territory's handover to the People's Republic of China on 30 June 1997. It now houses the local garrison of the People's Liberation Army and is formally known as Central Barracks, in line with PLA convention for naming barracks after the name of the locality.

=== Other landmarks ===
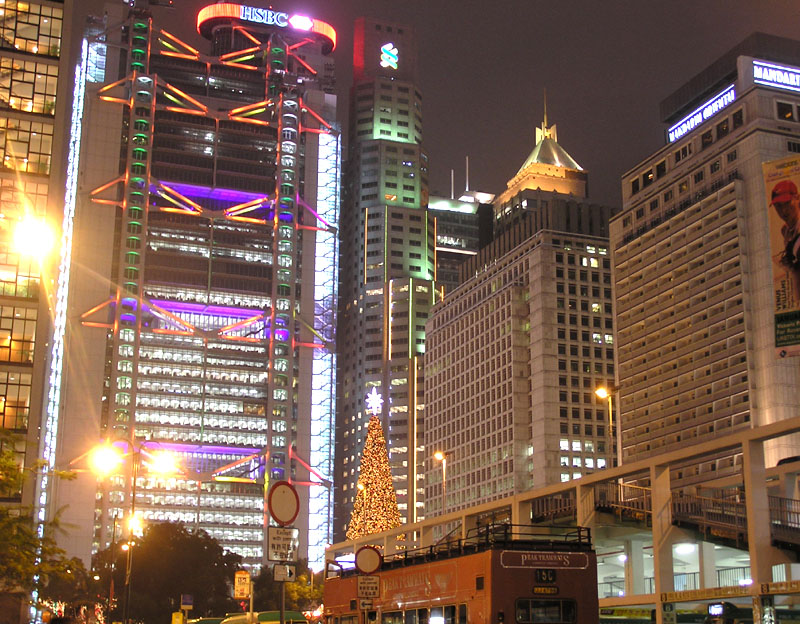
The headquarters of HSBC is a landmark in the Central and Western District of Hong Kong

- AIA Central
- Alexandra House
- Cenotaph, Hong Kong
- Bank of America Tower (Hong Kong)
- Old Bank of China Building
- Central Harbourfront
- Central Market
- Central Piers
- Chater Garden
- Chater House
- Cheung Kong Center
- Court of Final Appeal Building
- Consulate General of the United States, Hong Kong and Macau
- Edinburgh Place, Hong Kong – including Queen's Pier and the Star Ferry pier
- Exchange Square
- Edinburgh Tower
- Foreign Correspondents' Club (Hong Kong)
- Former French Mission Building
- Four Seasons Hotel Hong Kong
- Fringe Club
- Hang Seng Bank Headquarters Building
- Hong Kong Club
- Hong Kong Maritime Museum
- HSBC Hong Kong Headquarters Building
- ICBC Tower
- International Finance Centre
- Jardine House
- Justice Place
- Lan Kwai Fong
- Mandarin Oriental, Hong Kong
- Peak Tram terminus
- Pedder Building
- PMQ
- Prince's Building
- Standard Chartered Bank Building
- St. John's Building
- St John's Cathedral (Hong Kong)
- SoHo, Hong Kong
- Statue Square
- Tai Kwun
- The Landmark (Hong Kong)
- The Murray, Hong Kong
- The Helena May main building
- The Henderson
- Three Garden Road, Central
- Wheelock House
- World-Wide House

== Admiralty ==
- Queensway
- CITIC Tower
- Harcourt Garden
- Consulate General of the United Kingdom, Hong Kong
- Hong Kong Park
- Island Shangri-La
- JW Marriott Hotel Hong Kong
- Pacific Place (Hong Kong)
- Lippo Centre
- Upper House Hong Kong
- Admiralty Centre
- Far East Finance Centre
- Queensway Government Offices
- Central Government Complex (Hong Kong)
- Chinese People's Liberation Army Forces Hong Kong Building
- Asia Society Hong Kong Centre
- Legislative Council building

== Mid-Levels and the Peak ==
- Government House
- Cathedral of the Immaculate Conception (Hong Kong)
- Dr Sun Yat-sen Museum
- Hongkong Electric Headquarters
- Hong Kong Zoological and Botanical Gardens
- Commissioner's Office of China's Foreign Ministry in the HKSAR
- Peak Tower
- Jamia Mosque (Hong Kong)

== Sai Ying Pun and Kennedy Town ==
- Sai Ying Pun Community Complex
- Liaison Office of the Central People's Government in the HKSAR
- Praya, Kennedy Town
- New Praya, Kennedy Town
- King George V Memorial Park, Hong Kong
- Kennedy Town Swimming Pool
- Sun Yat Sen Memorial Park
- Sai Ying Pun Community Complex
- Office for Safeguarding National Security in the HKSAR (one of the worksites)
- Hongkong Tramways HQ

== Sheung Wan ==
- The Center
- Man Mo Temple
- Shun Tak Centre
- Hong Kong–Macau Ferry Terminal

== Education ==
=== Secondary schools ===
Arranged by alphabetical order of their full names in each category.

Government-administered schools:

- King's College

Aided schools:

- Lok Sin Tong Leung Kau Kui College
- Raimondi College
- St. Clare's Girls' School
- St. Joseph's College
- St. Louis School
- St. Stephen's Church College
- St. Stephen's Girls' College
- Ying Wa Girls' School

Schools under Direct Subsidy Scheme (DSS) and grant schools:

- St. Paul's Co-educational College
- St. Paul's College

International schools:

- German Swiss International School
- Island School (under funding of English Schools Foundation, subsidised by government)

=== Tertiary institutions ===
- The University of Hong Kong
- Caritas Institute of Higher Education
- The Chinese University of Hong Kong Faculty of Law
- Hong Kong University of Science and Technology Business School

=== Public libraries ===
Hong Kong Public Libraries operates three libraries in the district: City Hall Public Library, Shek Tong Tsui Public Library, and Smithfield Public Library.

== Transport ==
=== Link ===
- Route 3 (Hong Kong)
- Route 4 (Hong Kong)

Major roads that serves the area include:

- Harcourt Road
- Connaught Road Central, Connaught Road West
- Queensway, Queen's Road Central, Queen's Road West
- Des Voeux Road Central, Des Voeux Road West
- Hill Road Flyover
- Caine Road
- Robinson Road
- Park Road
- Bonham Road
- Western Harbour Crossing

=== Public transport ===
Public transport includes Hong Kong Tramways, the Peak Tram and the MTR.

MTR lines include:

- Island line: Sheung Wan station, Central station, Admiralty station, Sai Ying Pun, HKU, Kennedy Town
- Tsuen Wan line: Central station, Admiralty station
- Tung Chung line: Hong Kong station
- Airport Express: Hong Kong station
- South Island line: Admiralty station
- East Rail line: Admiralty station

== See also ==
- List of places in Hong Kong
- Tourism in Hong Kong
