= Nan Nan Resources =

Holding company in Hong Kong

Nan Nan Resources Enterprise Limited 南南資源實業有限公司

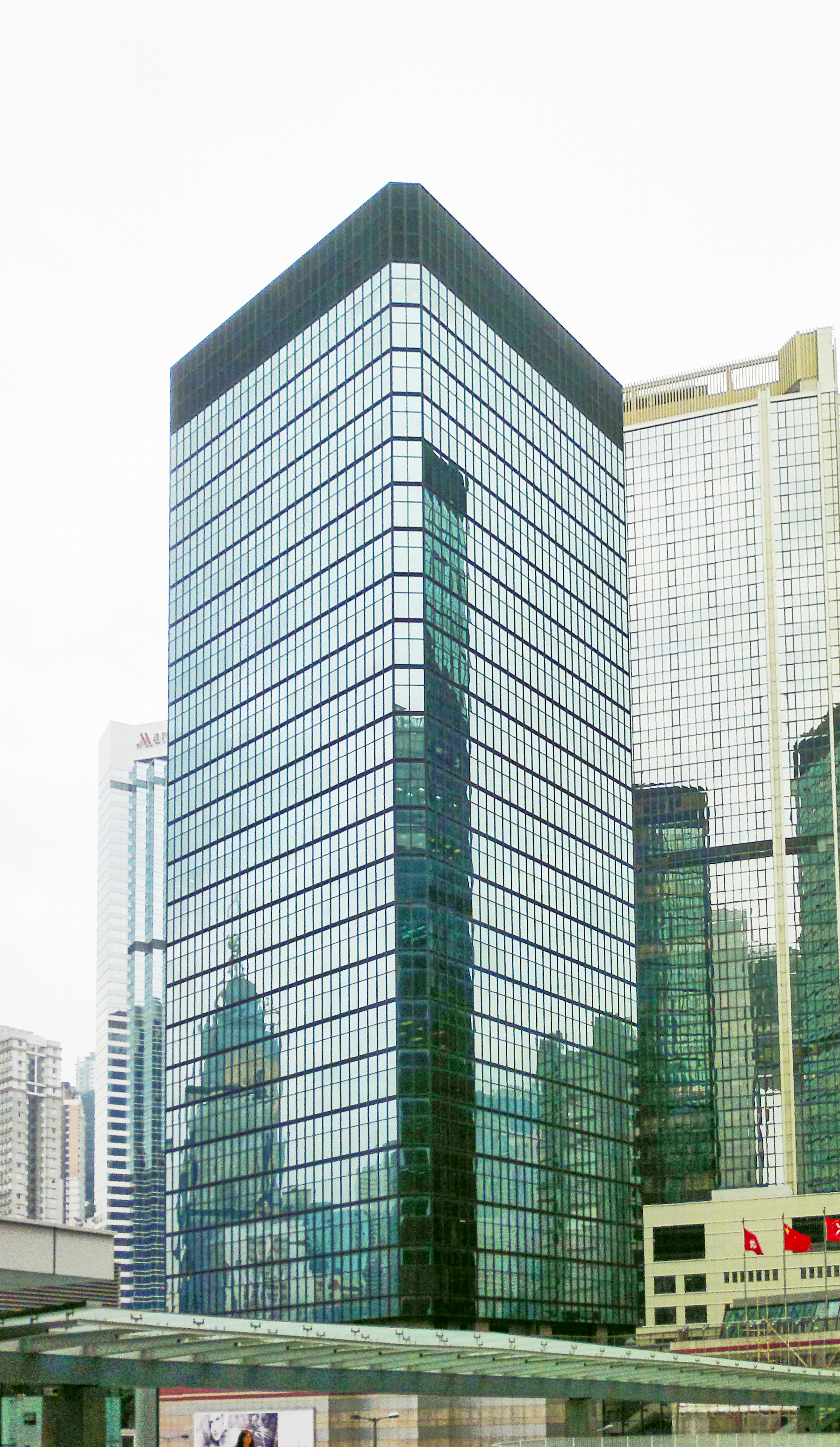
- Admiralty Centre Tower 2, where Nan Nan Resources is headquartered
- Trade name: NAN NAN RES
- Native name: 南南資源實業有限公司
- Formerly: Artfield Group Limited 雅域集團有限公司 (until 25 August 2009); China Sonangol Resources Enterprise Limited 安中資源實業有限公司 (until 14 April 2011); International Resources Enterprise Limited 國際資源實業有限公司 (until 10 October 2011)
- Type: public
- Traded as: SEHK: 1229
- Industry: Coal; Information technology; Petroleum; Renewable energy
- Founded: 1984; 42 years ago in Hong Kong
- Founder: Ip Yiu Tung
- Headquarters: Admiralty Centre Tower Two, 18 Harcourt Road, Admiralty, Hong Kong
- Key people: Kwan Man Fai (Chairman and Managing director); Wong Sze Wai (Executive director); Li Chun Fung (Executive director)
- Number of employees: 136 (2024)
- Subsidiaries: Harbour Group Holdings Limited; Mulei County Kai Yuan Coal Company Limited; NEFIN Leasing Technologies Limited
- Website: nannanlisted.com

Nan Nan Resources Enterprise Limited
- Traditional Chinese: 南南資源實業有限公司
- Simplified Chinese: 南南资源实业有限公司
Transcriptions
Standard Mandarin
- Hanyu Pinyin: Nán Nán Zīyuán Shíyè Yǒuxiàngōngsī
Yue: Cantonese
- Jyutping: naam4 naam4 zi1 jyun4 sat6 jip6 jau5 haan6 gung1 si1

Nan Nan Resources Enterprise Limited (Chinese: 南南資源實業有限公司) (SEHK: 1229) is a Hong Kong-based investment holding company. It is primarily focused on mining coal in China, though it also operates in the renewable energy and information technology sectors. Though incorporated in Bermuda and now headquartered in the Admiralty Centre, it is a former 88 Queensway group company and was formerly known as Artfield Group Limited (Chinese: 雅域集團有限公司), China Sonangol Resources Enterprise Limited (Chinese: 安中資源實業有限公司), and International Resources Enterprise Limited (Chinese: 國際資源實業有限公司).

== History ==
Artfield Group Limited was founded in 1984 by Hongkonger entrepreneur Ip Yiu Tung and taken public on the Hong Kong Stock Exchange in 1995. It manufactured, marketed, and traded watches, clocks, office products, lights, and metals in North America, Europe, Hong Kong, and China. Artfield was taken over in early 2008 by Ascent Goal Investments Limited, a subsidiary of China Sonangol International Limited. By March, Ascent had purchased 74% of Artfield and installed Lo Fong Hung as chairperson and managing director and her husband Wang Xiangfei and Kwan Man Fai to the board. Artfield's head office was relocated to the tenth floor of Two Pacific Place, 88 Queensway, Admiralty, Hong Kong, the site of Ascent, China Sonangol International, and dozens of other businesses Hung, Xiangfei, and Fai are collectively involved with. Under their leadership, Artfield pivoted away from lights and metals and into natural resources, particularly the petroleum industry.

In August 2008, Soviet-born Israeli diamond magnate Lev Leviev personally and through his companies Africa Israel Financial Assets and Strategies Ltd and Memorand Management Limited purchased a total 10% share of the Artfield Group. One week later, China Sonangol International Holdings Limited, on whose board of directors Hung and Xiangfei sat, purchased nearly one billion US$ worth of Manhattan real estate from Africa Israel International, including 23 Wall Street and shares in 229 West 43rd Street and the Met Life Tower. Kwan Man Fai signed the deed to 23 Wall Street while acting as vice-president of CS Wall Street LLC. Such sales while negotiating for ownership were potentially breaches of the Hong Kong Stock Exchange's listing rules.

In August 2009, Artfield Group Limited was renamed China Sonangol Resources Enterprise Limited, trading under the name China Sonangol on the Hong Kong Stock Exchange. In 2011, the company would change its identity to International Resources Enterprise Limited in April and then to Nan Nan Resources Enterprise Limited in October. From 2014 to 2019, Nan Nan Resources would suffer a 56% decline in stock value over five years. The company had been running at a loss from 2013 to 2017 when it returned to profitability and its stock value jumped 19%. Wong Sze Wai was appointed executive director in November 2018, replacing Lo Fong Hung. Wang Xiangfei resigned in September 2021 and was replaced by Li Chun Fung. In 2024, Nan Nan Resources struggled to maintain a positive cash flow, suffered a 52% decline in revenue over a twelve-month period, and carried significant debt that made investment analysts wary of its long-term investment value.

== Subsidiaries ==
Nan Nan Resources fully owns the following companies:

- Harbour Group Holdings Limited, a holding company holding the entirety of issued stock of several IT service outsourcing and consulting companies in Hong Kong, Malaysia, Singapore, and the United Kingdom.
- Mulei County Kai Yuan Coal Company Limited ("Kaiyuan Company"), which operates Kaiyuan Open Pit Coal Mine in Changji, Xinjiang, China. In 2018, the mine briefly shut down operations due to license expiration but renewed operations shortly afterward.
- NEFIN Leasing Technologies Limited is a Hong Kong investment company with Malaysia-based NEFIN Technologies Sdn. Bhd. as its own wholly owned subsidiary. NEFIN Technologies is principally involved in the development of solar power systems.
