= Bank of China Mansion =

Bank of China Mansion may refer to:

- Bank of China Mansion, Qingdao, a skyscraper in Qingdao, China

== See also ==
- Bank of China Building (disambiguation)
- Bank of China Tower (disambiguation)
