= Tim Mei Avenue =

Street in Hong Kong

Coordinates: 22.280236°N 114.166488°E

Tim Mei Avenue (Chinese: 添美道; Jyutping: tim1 mei5 dou6) is a street in Admiralty, Hong Kong.

The street is built on land reclaimed as part of the Central Reclamation Phase II, which was completed in 1997 and reclaimed 5.3 hectares of land at the former Tamar naval base. The area was subsequently known as the Tamar site. Tim Mei Avenue connects Harcourt Road and Lung Wo Road. Buildings along the street include CITIC Tower and the Central Government Complex.

== Civic Square ==
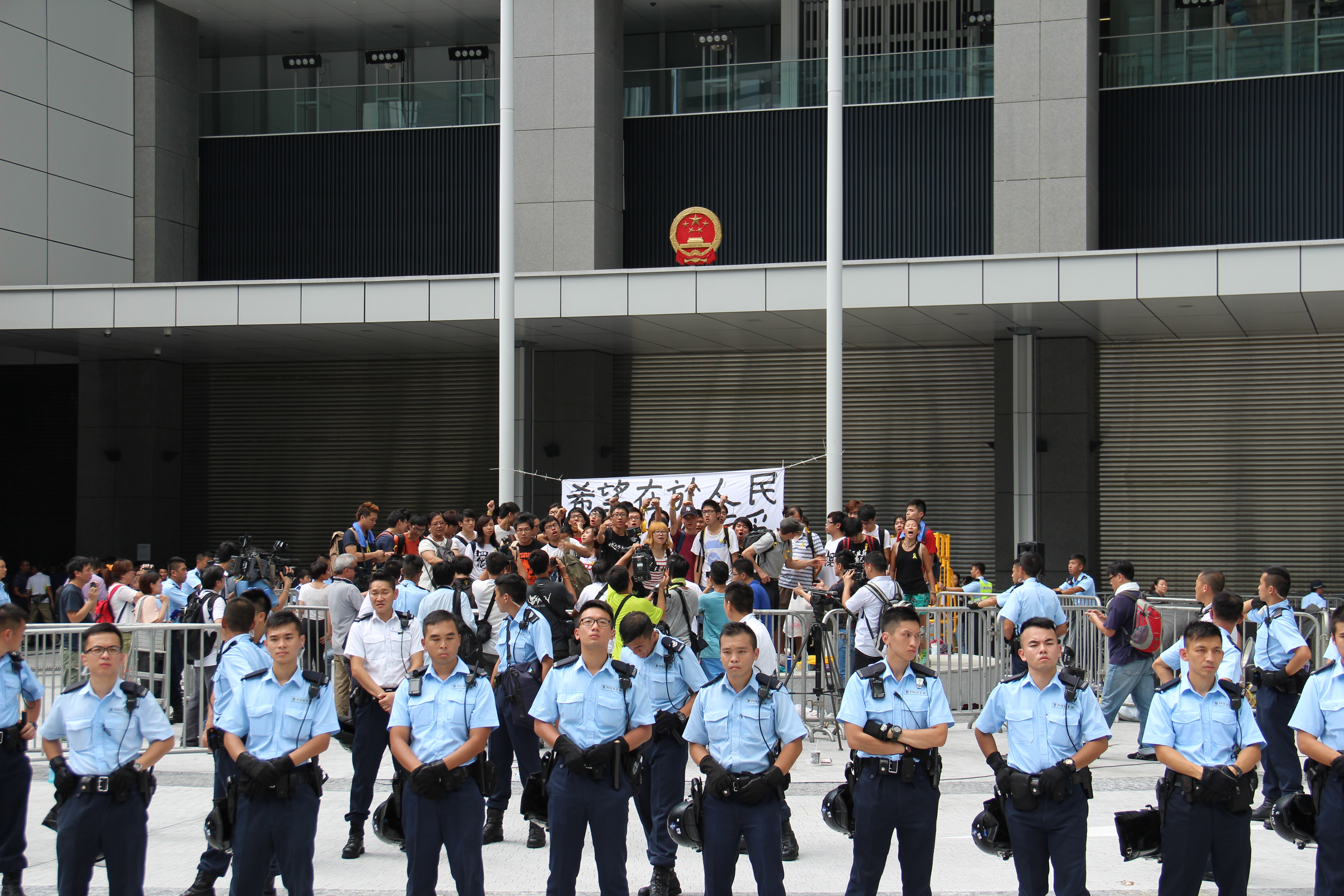
Policemen surround the students protesting at Civic Square in September 2014

Civic Square, whose access is from Tim Mei Avenue, was conceived as public open space accessible to all. The square was however closed off in July 2014 after protesters opposed to the creation of new towns in certain parts of the New Territories gathered in the square and stormed into the Legislative Council (LegCo) complex from there. The government erected a 3-metre (9.8 ft) fence all around the square for security costing around HK$2 million without consulting LegCo. Since early September, the government reopened the square to the public, daily between 6am and 11pm.

A student-led march in protest against the framework for electoral reform of the election of the chief executive by universal suffrage announced by the NPC Standing Committee to "reclaim" the privatised Civic Square was a trigger for the Umbrella Revolution.
