= Far East Finance Centre =

- 遠東金融中心
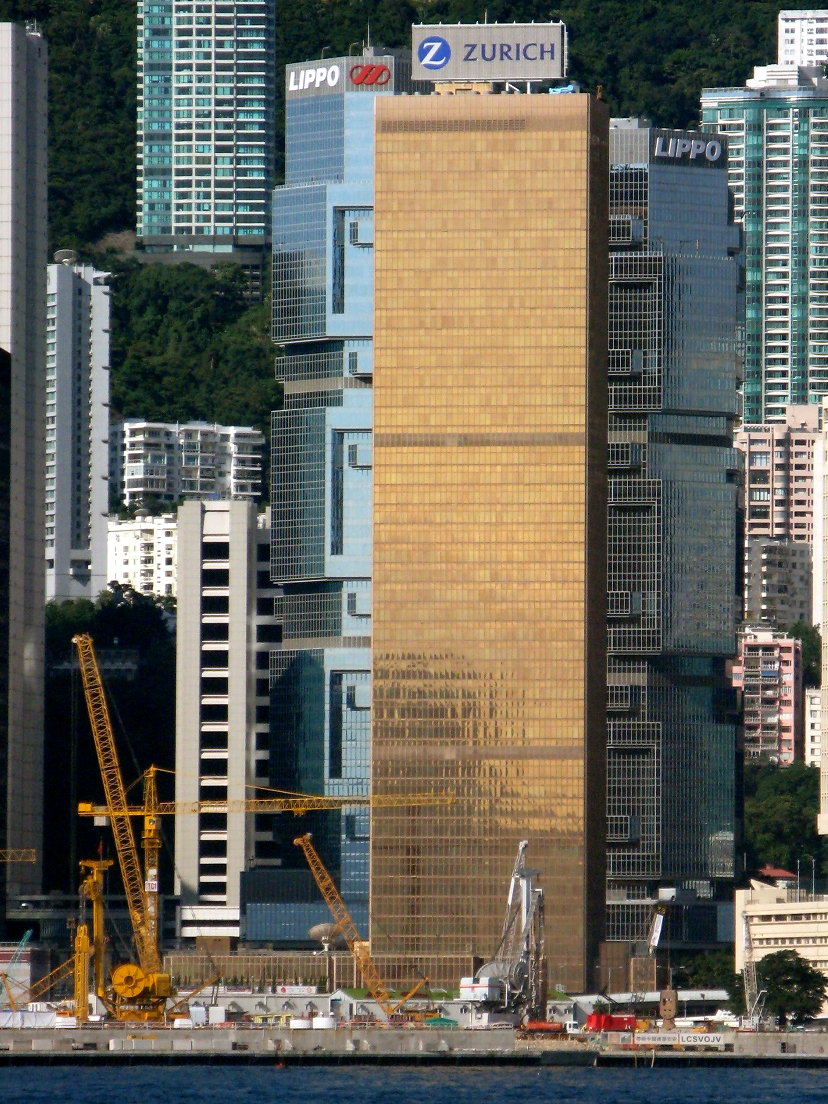
- Interactive map of the Far East Finance Centre area

General information
- Location: Hong Kong, 16 Harcourt Road, Admiralty
- Completed: 1982

Technical details
- Floor count: 48

The Far East Finance Centre is a commercial building at 16 Harcourt Road in Admiralty, Hong Kong. It was jointly-constructed by Sino Land, Far East Consortium, Wah Ha Realty and Aik San Realty. The building is of 48 floors. The building was climbed by French urban climber Alain Robert in 1996.

== Tenants ==
Tenants of the Far East Finance Centre include the Consulate General of the Republic of Korea, which they occupy the fifth floor of the building. Large enterprises tenants include the China Everbright Group and Bank Negara Indonesia.

== Nearby commercial buildings ==
The Far East Financial Centre is located in the centre of Admiralty, which there are many commercial buildings nearby. They include:

- Queensway Plaza
- Admiralty Centre
- Lippo Centre
- Cheung Kong Center II
- Tamar Park
- Bank of America Tower
- Central Government Complex

== See also ==
- Central Elevated Walkway
