= Admiralty, Hong Kong =

Business district in Hong Kong

Coordinates: 22.279636°N 114.165487°E

Admiralty
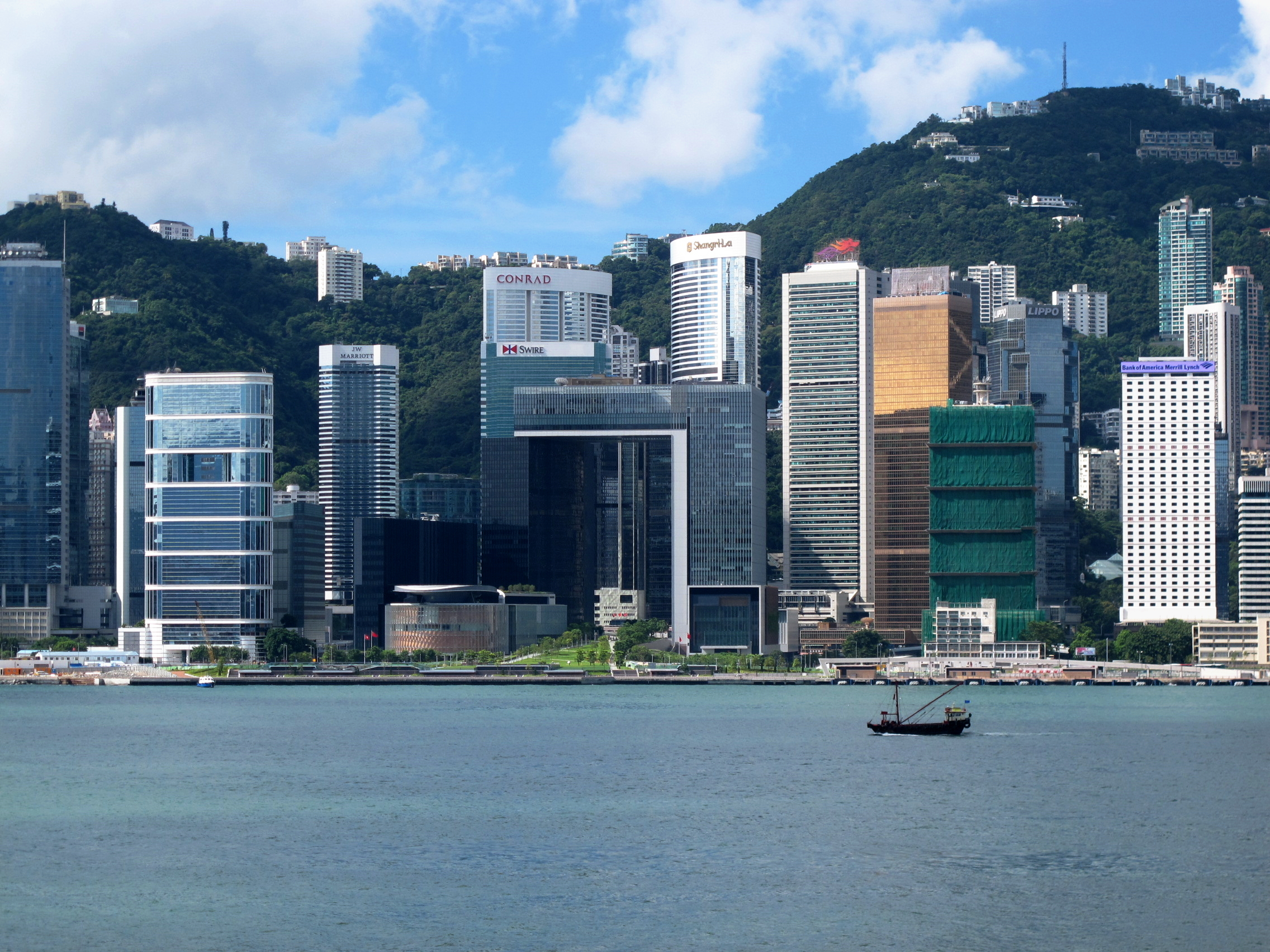
- Admiralty skyline in August 2013. The Central Government Complex is in the centre.
- Traditional Chinese: 金鐘
- Simplified Chinese: 金钟
- Cantonese Yale: Gāmjūng
- Literal meaning: Golden Bell
Transcriptions
Standard Mandarin
- Hanyu Pinyin: Jīnzhōng
Yue: Cantonese
- Yale Romanization: Gāmjūng
- Jyutping: Gam^{1}zung^{1}
- IPA: [kɐ́m.tsóŋ]

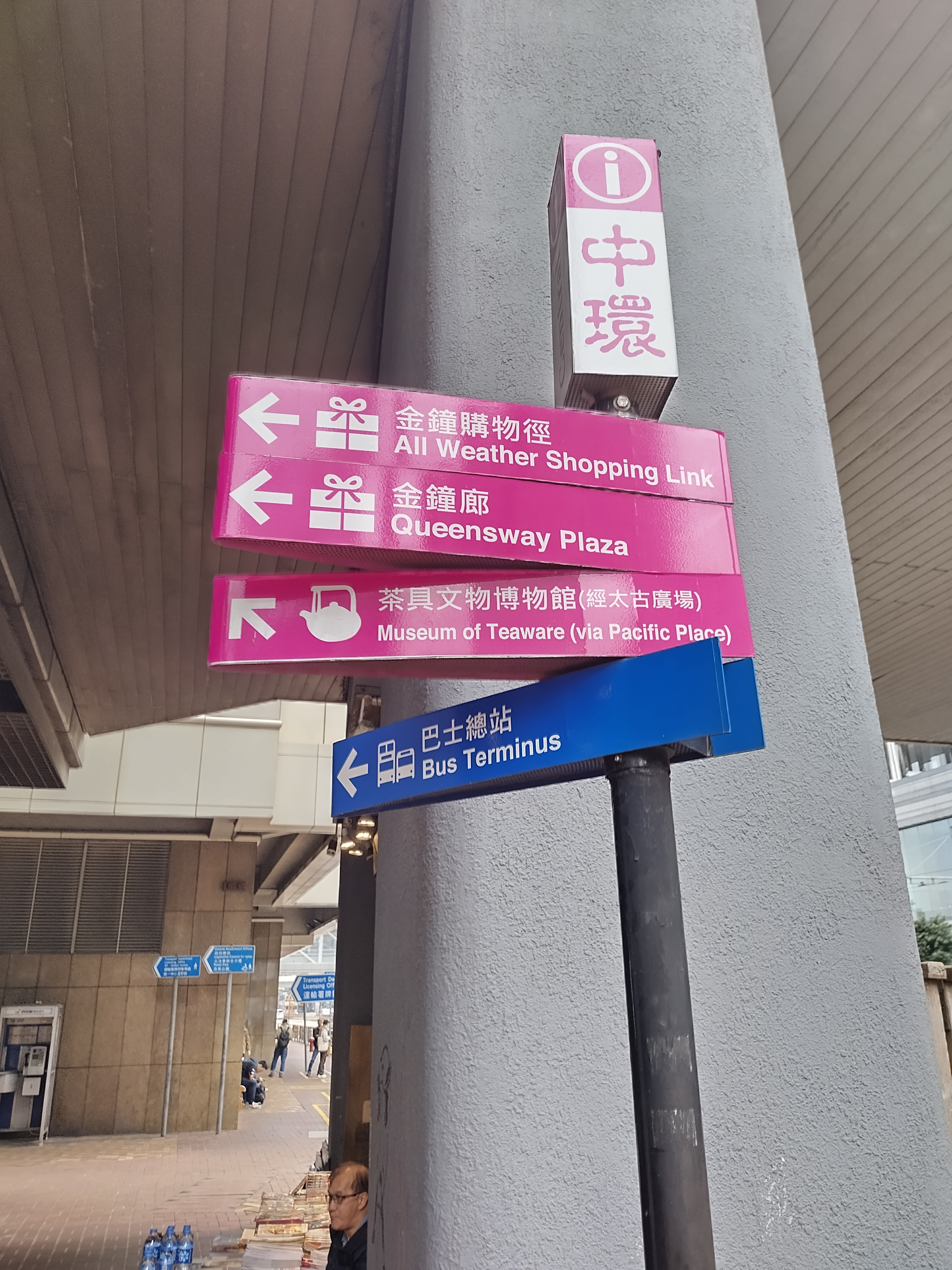
"Admiralty" is not an official place name and is considered to be a part of Central, so Tourism Commission marks signage in Admiralty as "Central".

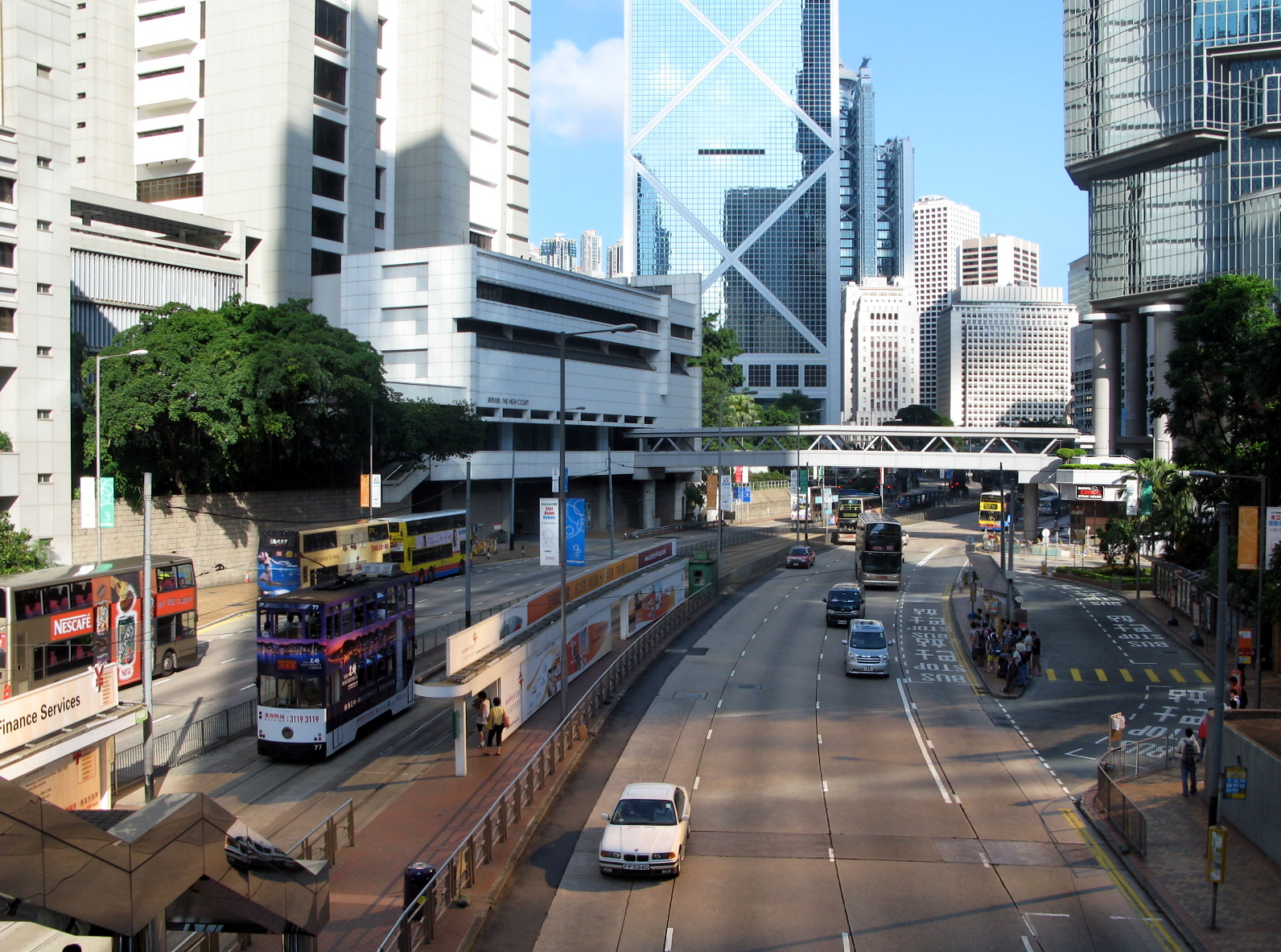
Traffic of Queensway in Admiralty, looking west towards Central in August 2009.

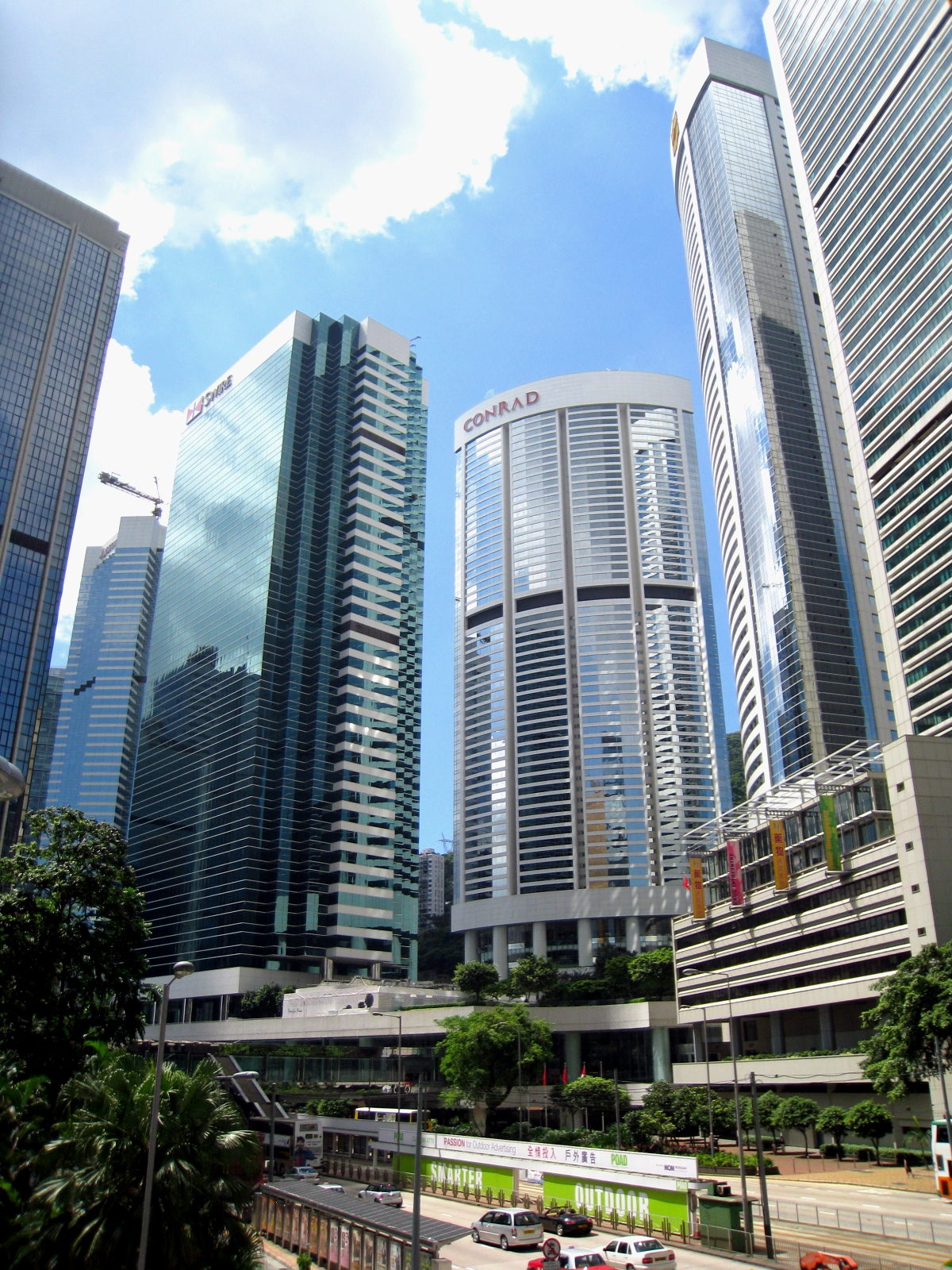
View of Pacific Place across Queensway in June 2008.

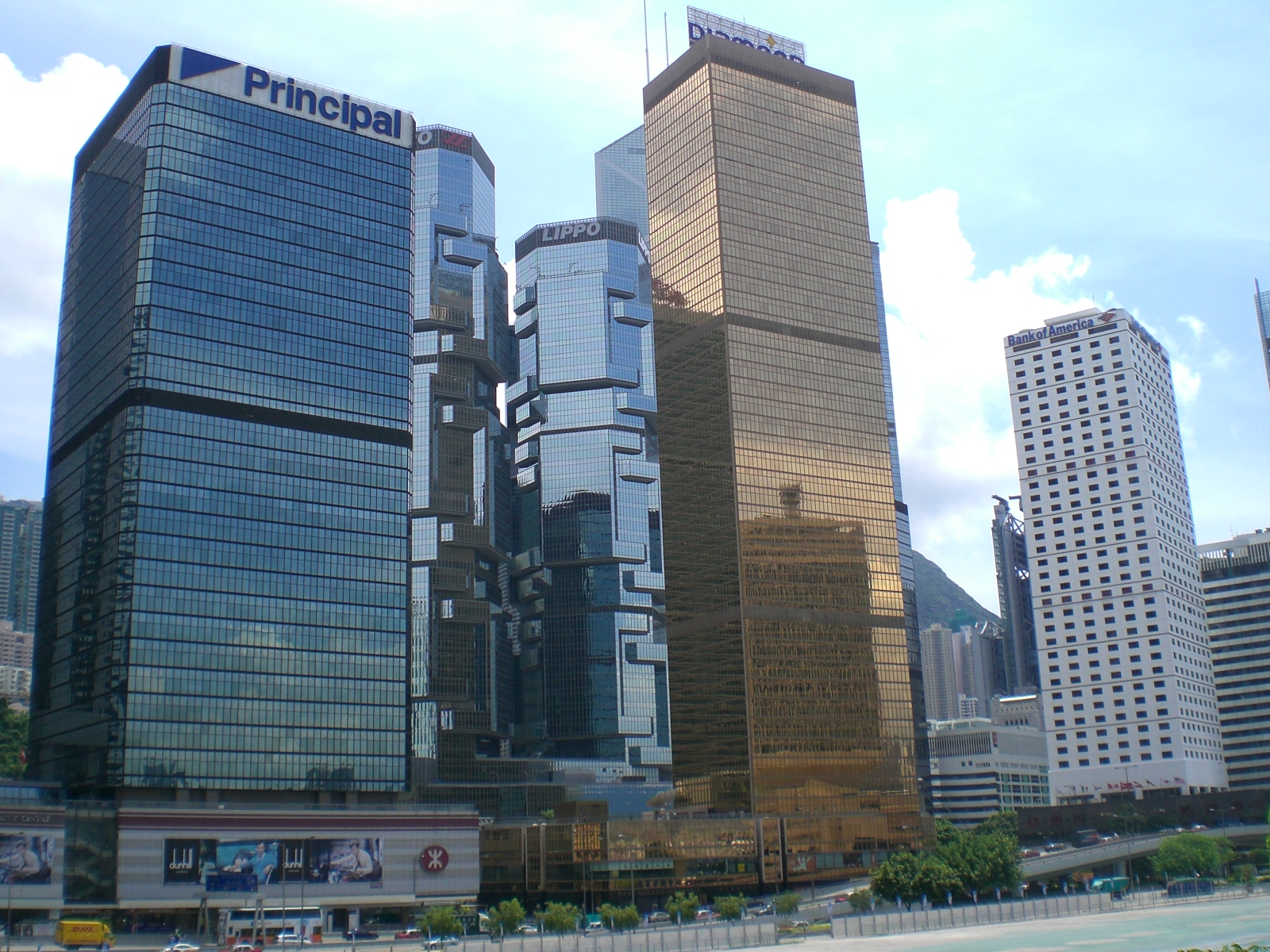
From left to right: Admiralty Centre on top of Admiralty station, Lippo Centre, Far East Finance Centre and Bank of America Tower, viewed across Harcourt Road in June 2007.

Admiralty (金鐘; Gāmjūng) is the eastern extension of the central business district (adjacent to, but separate from, Central) on the Hong Kong Island of Hong Kong. It is located on the eastern end of the Central and Western District, bordered by Wan Chai to the east and Victoria Harbour to the north.

The name of Admiralty refers to the former Admiralty Dock in the area which housed a naval dockyard. The dock was later demolished when land was reclaimed and developed northward as the naval base HMS Tamar. The Cantonese name, Kam Chung (金鐘), lit. "Golden Bell", refers to a gold-coloured bell that was used for timekeeping at Wellington Barracks.

== History ==
The area was developed as a military site by the British garrison in Hong Kong in the 19th century. Under their direction, the Wellington Barracks, Murray Barracks, Victoria Barracks and Admiralty Dock were built at the site. Following the urbanisation of the northern shore of Hong Kong Island during the 20th century, the urban area there was split in two by the military site. The colonial government of Hong Kong made repeated attempts to acquire the military site to connect the two urban areas, but were rebuffed. However, from the 1970s onwards the military site was gradually returned to the colonial government, and several commercial buildings and gardens were built on the site.

The Admiralty station of the MTR was built on the former site of a dockyard which was built in 1878 and demolished in the 1970s. After its completion, the area became increasingly known as Admiralty, rather than Central. During the 2014 Hong Kong protests, substantial tracts of the area were occupied by protestors, who dubbed it Umbrella Square. Admiralty was also a focal point for protestors during the 2019–2020 Hong Kong protests.

== Features ==
Buildings in Admiralty consist primarily of office buildings, government buildings, shopping malls and hotels. There are also several parks in the area: Hong Kong Park, Tamar Park and Harcourt Garden.

The main development of the area in recent years has been the development of the Tamar site into the Central Government Complex, which started operating in 2011. Facing Victoria Harbour, the complex houses the Office of the Chief Executive, the Legislative Council Complex and the Central Government Offices.

As one of the main financial areas in Hong Kong, there are plenty of Grade-A commercial buildings in Admiralty including:

- Admiralty Centre, housing the The HKU Admiralty Town Center
- Asia Society Hong Kong Centre, housed in the former Former Explosive Magazine of the Victoria Barracks
- Bank of America Tower, housing the CUHK Faculty of Law
- Bank of China Tower
- British Consulate General Hong Kong
- Central Government Complex, Tamar
- Chinese People's Liberation Army Forces Hong Kong Building
- CITIC Tower
- Cheung Kong Centre
- Far East Finance Centre
- High Court Building
- Lippo Centre, which houses the Taipei Economic and Cultural Office
- Pacific Place, a complex featuring a shopping mall, several hotels and office towers, that opened in Admiralty in phases between 1988 and 1991. The complex is connected to the MTR Admiralty station via an underground walkway. A later phase, Three Pacific Place, is located in Wan Chai
- Queensway Government Offices
- Queensway Plaza, a shopping centre located above Admiralty station
- United Centre, housing the Admiralty Centre of HKUST Business School

== Transport ==
Queensway and Harcourt Road are the major roads in the area. Both roads run from west to east and connect Central to Wan Chai. Other streets include Rodney Street and Tim Mei Avenue. Trams are running across Admiralty along Queensway. Most of the buildings of the area are connected through the Central Elevated Walkway, an extensive footbridge network which extends to the western part of Central.

The area is served by the peaktram and Admiralty station of the MTR. It is an interchange station between Island line, Tsuen Wan line, South Island line and East Rail line. The Admiralty (East) Public Transport Interchange, a major bus terminus, is located above the station.

== Economy ==
Firms and companies headquartered in Admiralty or with regional offices there include:

- Amundi
- Allianz SE
- Bain Capital
- Cambridge Associates
- CLSA
- Conrad Hong Kong
- CITIC Pacific Ltd, in the CITIC Tower
- CITIC Securities
- Crédit Agricole Corporate and Investment Bank
- Culturecom (formerly Jademan), in the Far East Finance Centre
- Daiwa Capital Markets
- Deloitte
- DZ Bank
- Everbright International, in the Far East Finance Centre
- Fidelity International
- Hill Dickinson
- Hongkong Electric (Kennedy Road)
- Hong Kong General Chamber of Commerce
- Hogan Lovells Cadwalader
- Interactive Brokers
- Island Shangri-La
- IFC Regional Office and the World Bank Private Sector Development Office
- JW Marriott Hotel Hong Kong
- Lippo Ltd, in the Lippo Centre
- Moelis & Company
- Moody's Ratings
- Rabobank
- Schroders
- State Bank of Indonesia
- Swire Pacific
- Tanner De Witt
- Temple Chambers
- Toronto-Dominion Bank
- Quinn Emanuel Urquhart & Sullivan
- Upper House Hong Kong

=== Consulate General and Honorary Consulate ===
- Consulate General of Belarus
- Consulate General of Brunei Darussalam
- Consulate General of France
- Consulate General of Germany
- Consulate General of India
- Consulate General of Israel
- Consulate General of Mongolia
- Consulate General of the Philippines
- Consulate General of South Korea, Hong Kong
- Consulate General of Singapore
- Consulate General of the United Kingdom, Hong Kong
- Honorary Consulate of Albania
- Honorary Consulate of Kenya
- Honorary Consulate of Seychelles

== See also ==
- List of buildings, sites and areas in Hong Kong
- Central and Wan Chai Reclamation
