= CITIC Tower =

Building in Hong Kong, China

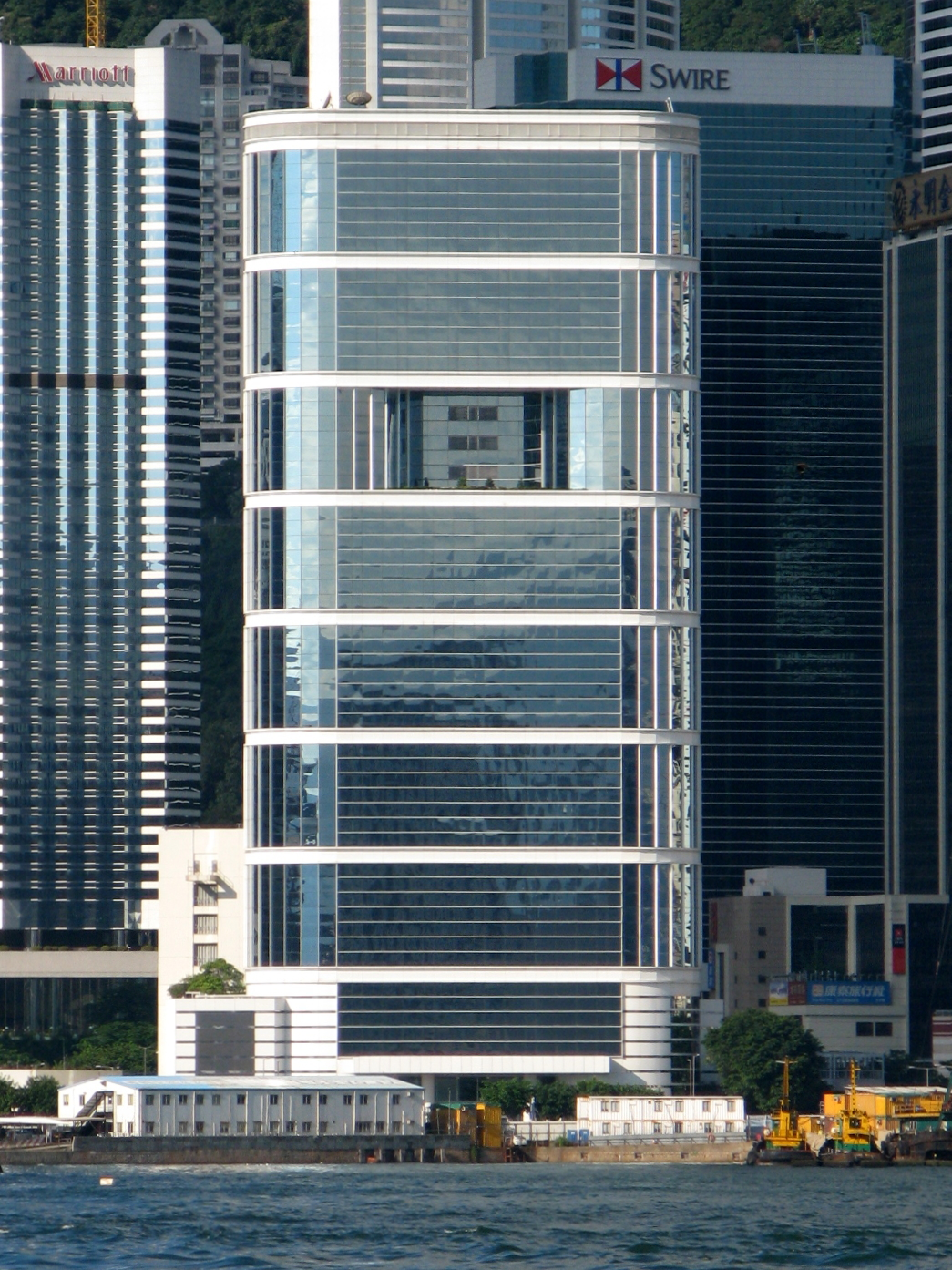
- View of CITIC Tower from Kowloon
- Interactive map of the CITIC Tower area

General information
- Status: Completed
- Location: 1 Tim Mei Avenue, Admiralty, Hong Kong, China
- Coordinates: 22°16′50.51″N 114°10′1.73″E
- Completed: 1997; 29 years ago

Height
- Roof: 413 ft (126 m)

Technical details
- Floor count: 33

Design and construction
- Architect: P & T Architects & Engineers Ltd

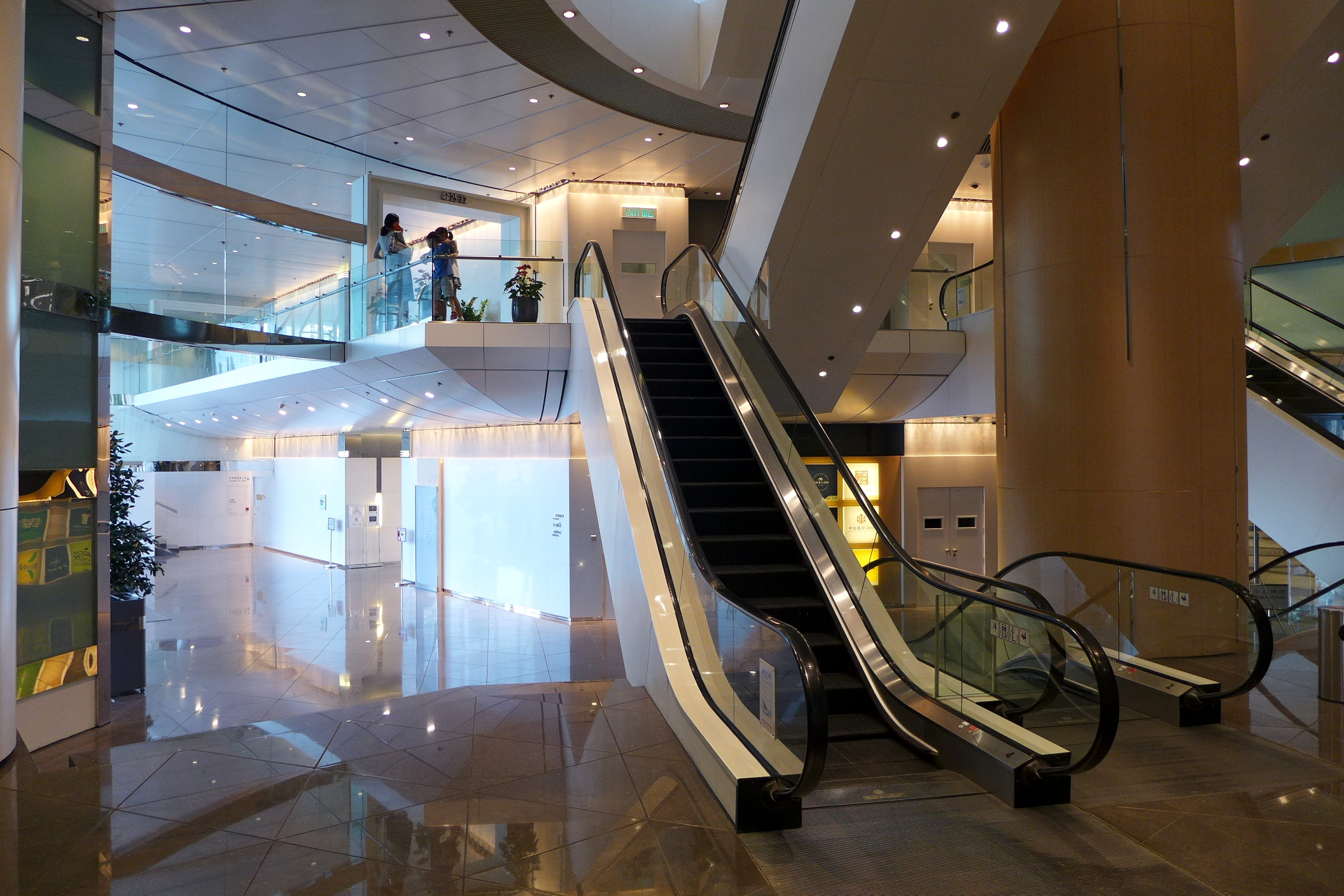
CITIC Tower Office Lobby

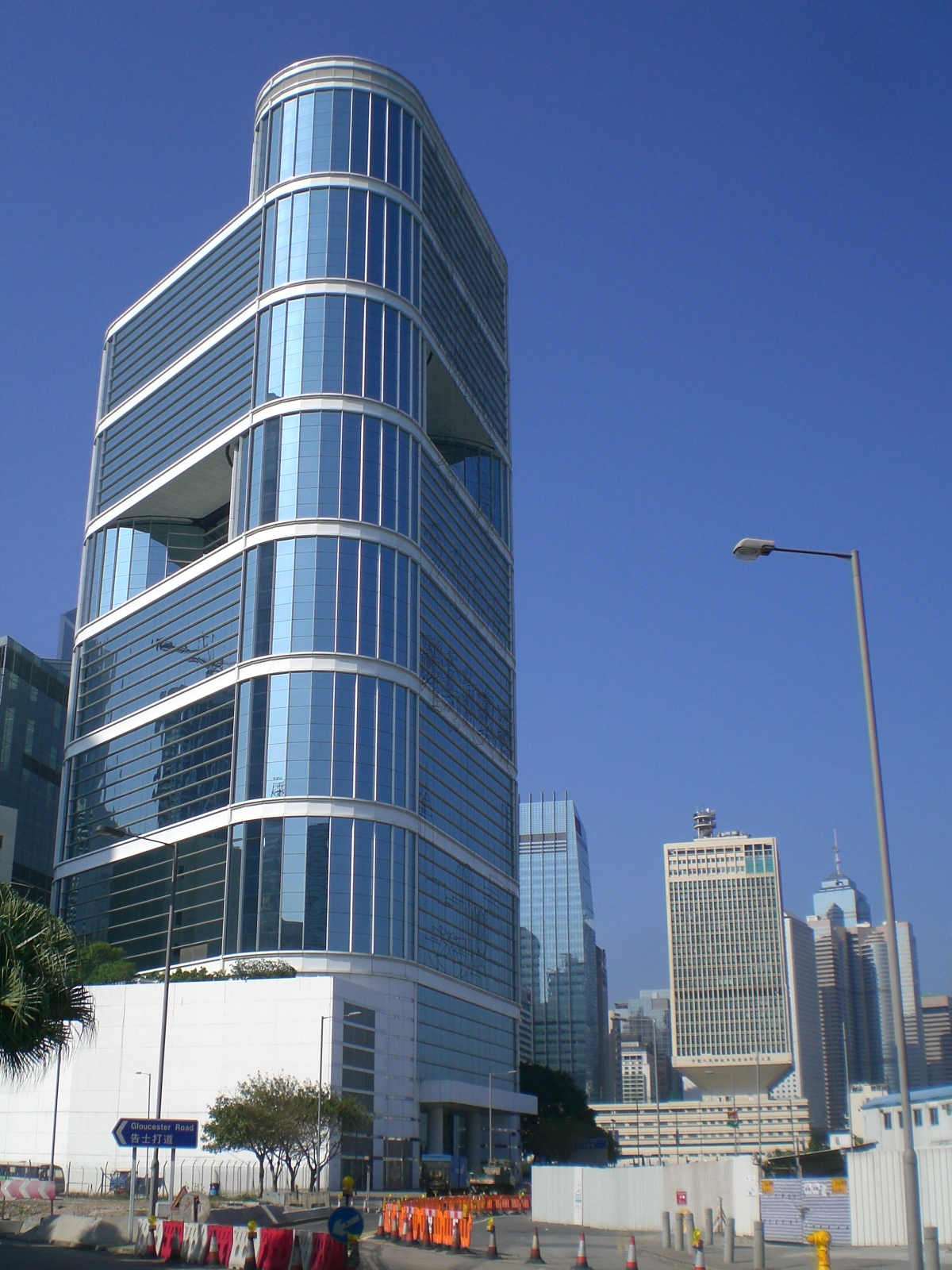
CITIC Tower from Lung Wui Road

CITIC Tower (Chinese: 中信大廈) is a 33-storey office building on Tim Mei Avenue, Admiralty, Hong Kong. It is the corporate headquarters of CITIC Pacific Ltd, a conglomerate publicly traded on the Hong Kong Stock Exchange and listed on the Hang Seng Index, and also a subsidiary of the CITIC Group.

CITIC Tower is also the headquarters of another development partner, Kerry Group.

It is one of the participants in the nightly A Symphony of Lights (幻彩詠香江) light show on both sides of Victoria Harbour.

In an authorised protest in 2019, police surrounded the tower on both sides, trapping protesters and fired tear gas into the crowd of protesters. International experts called the use of tear gas excessive, "actually inciting and causing what looks like a stampede".

== Design and construction ==
The tower was conceived as an equilateral triangular block with landscaped sky gardens at various levels. The architecture was designed by P&T Group. Its unique design is composed of equilateral triangles and circles.

CITIC Tower was completed in 1997 under a fast track development programme.

== Location and facilities ==
It borders the Tamar site in Admiralty and features a view of Victoria Harbour. At the lower levels there is a shopping mall and carpark. There is a footbridge connecting it with Admiralty Centre and MTR Admiralty station.

The government headquarters buildings are adjacent to CITIC Tower.

== Current tenants ==
- Maybank (7/F,18/F)
- CITIC Pacific Ltd (29/F-32/F)
- CITIC Capital (27/F-28/F)
- CITIC Securities International (8/F,11/F & 26/F)
- Kaplan (6/F)
- Mizuho Bank
- Shangri-La International Hotel Management Ltd (2/F)
- Simon-Kucher (20/F)
