= Bank of China Building =

Bank of China Building may refer to:

- Bank of China Building, Shanghai
- Bank of China Building (Hong Kong)
- Bank of China Building, Macau
- Bank of China Building, Singapore
- Bank of China Building (Penang)

== See also ==
- Bank of China Tower (disambiguation)
- Bank of China Mansion (disambiguation)
