= Bank of China Tower =

Bank of China Tower may refer to:

- Bank of China Tower (Hong Kong)
- Bank of China Tower, Shanghai

== See also ==
- Bank of China Building (disambiguation)
- Bank of China Mansion (disambiguation)
