= Bank of China Mansion, Qingdao =

Bank of China Mansion
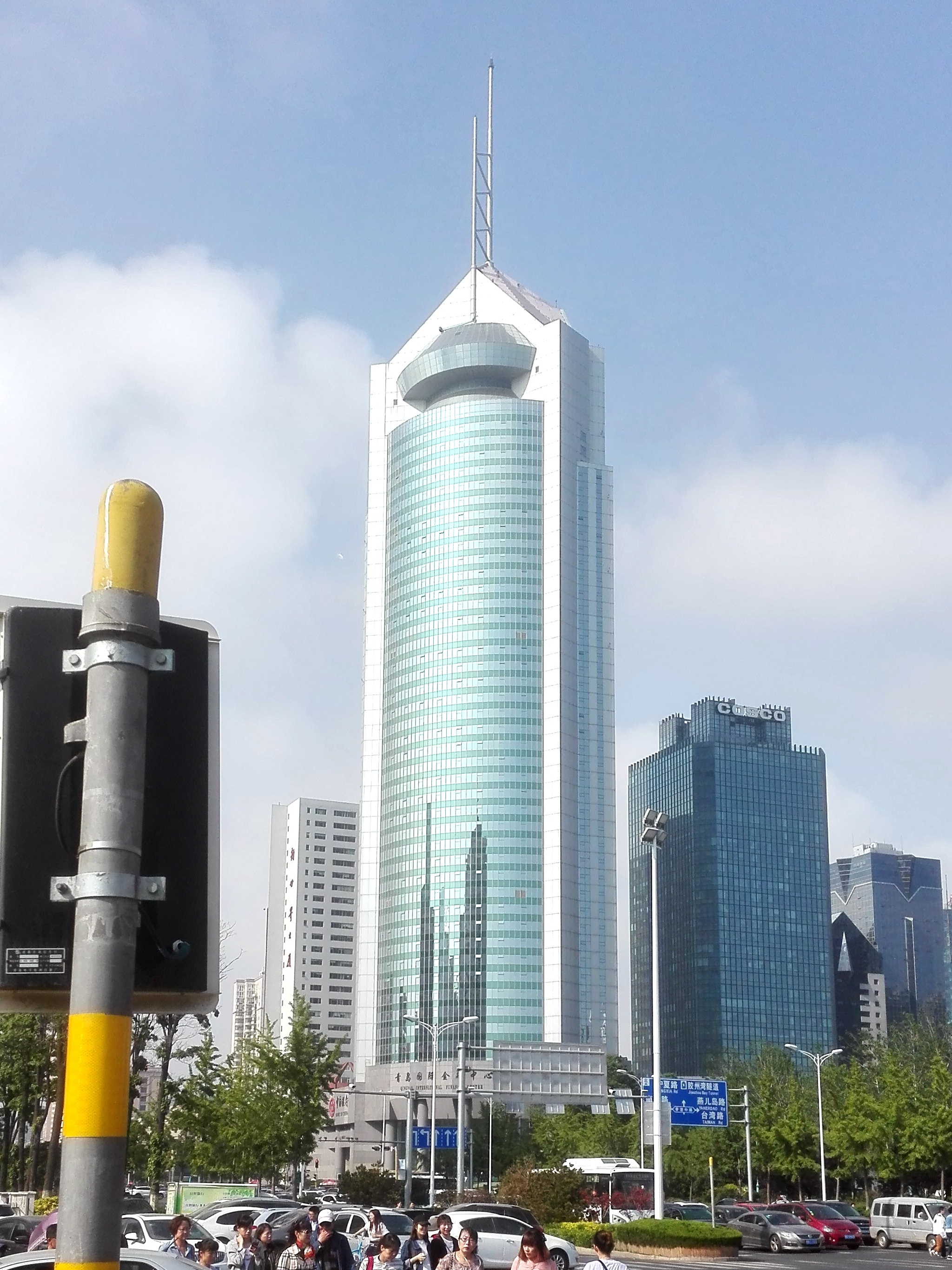

General information
- Location: Qingdao, China
- Coordinates: 36°03′56.2″N 120°23′28.8″E
- Completed: 2007

Height
- Antenna spire: 243 m (797 ft)

Technical details
- Floor count: 54

Bank of China Mansion (simplified Chinese: 青岛中银大厦; traditional Chinese: 青島中銀大廈; pinyin: Qīngdǎo Zhōngyín Dàshà) is a 54-floor 241 meter (791 foot) tall skyscraper completed in 1999 located in Qingdao, China.

== See also ==
- List of tallest buildings in the world
