= Admiralty Centre =

Commercial Building

- 海富中心
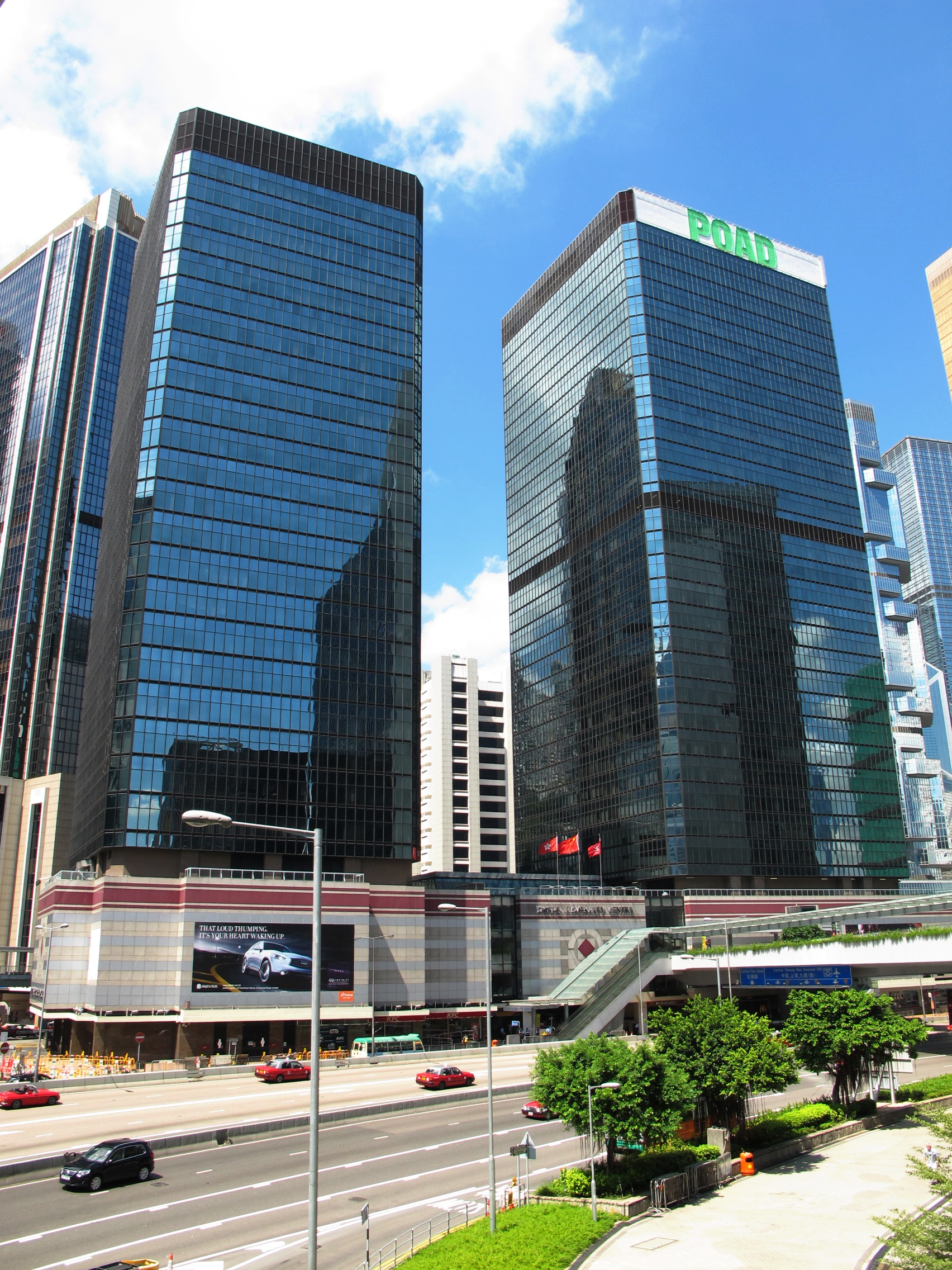
- Interactive map of the Admiralty Centre area

General information
- Status: Completed
- Type: Commercial
- Completed: 1980
- Landlord: MTR Corporation Ltd

Design and construction
- Developer: Cheung Kong (Holdings) Limited

Admiralty Centre (Chinese: 海富中心) is a two towers building in Hong Kong. It is located at 18 Harcourt Road Admiralty. It contains a shopping centre and office space.

== Shopping centre ==
The shopping centre encompasses the bottom three floors of the building. The shopping centre houses numerous tenants, including the flagship store of McDonalds in Hong Kong, which was ranked the second busiest of the world, and the HKU Space Admiralty Learning Centre.

== Office space ==
The office space is divided between the two towers, Admiralty Centre Tower I and Tower II. Tower I contains 32 floors while tower II contains 26 flowers. Tenants of the towers include Japanese company Kao Corporation and the consulate generals of Albania, France, Israel, Kenya, and Singapore.

== Gallery ==
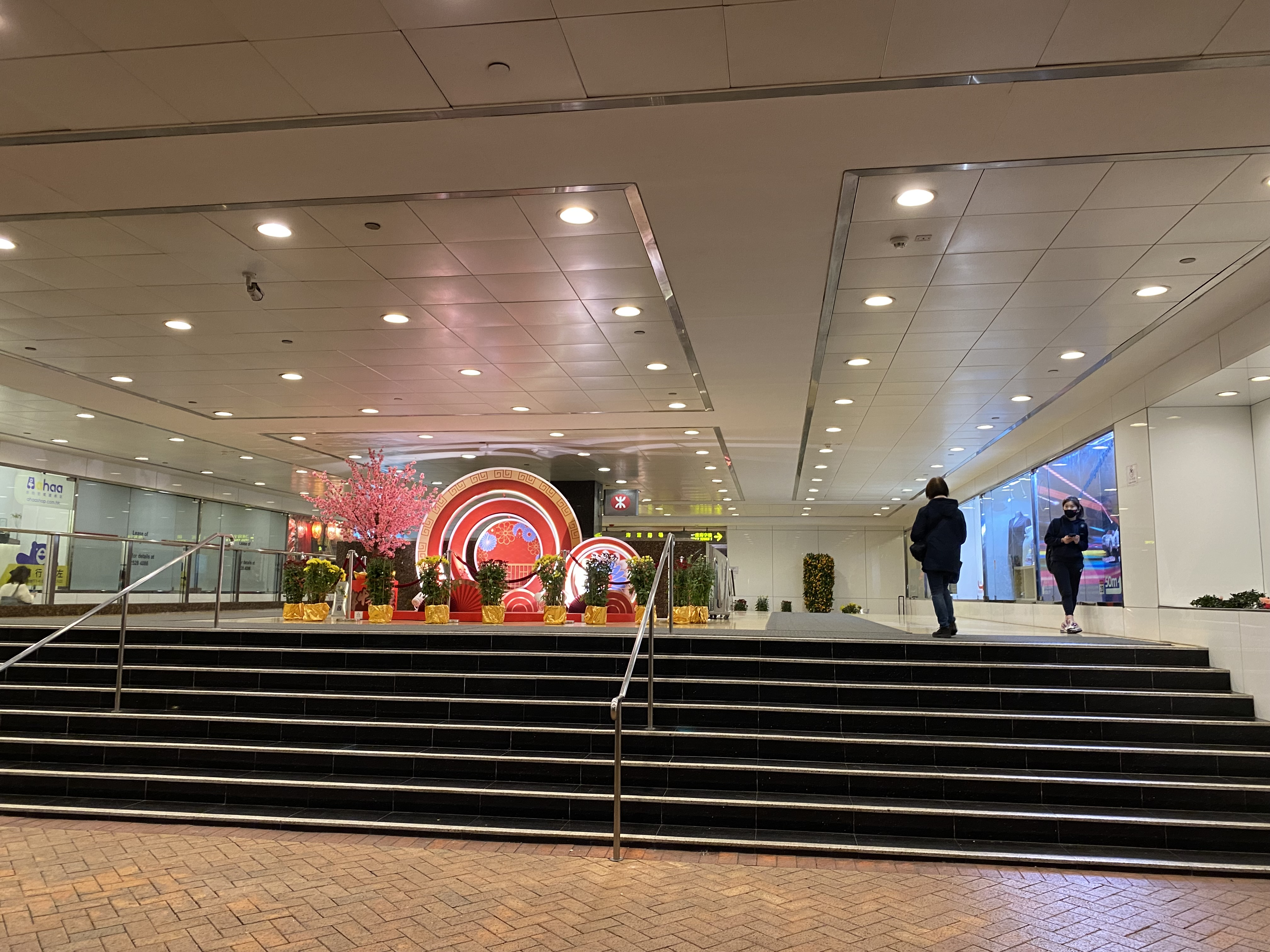

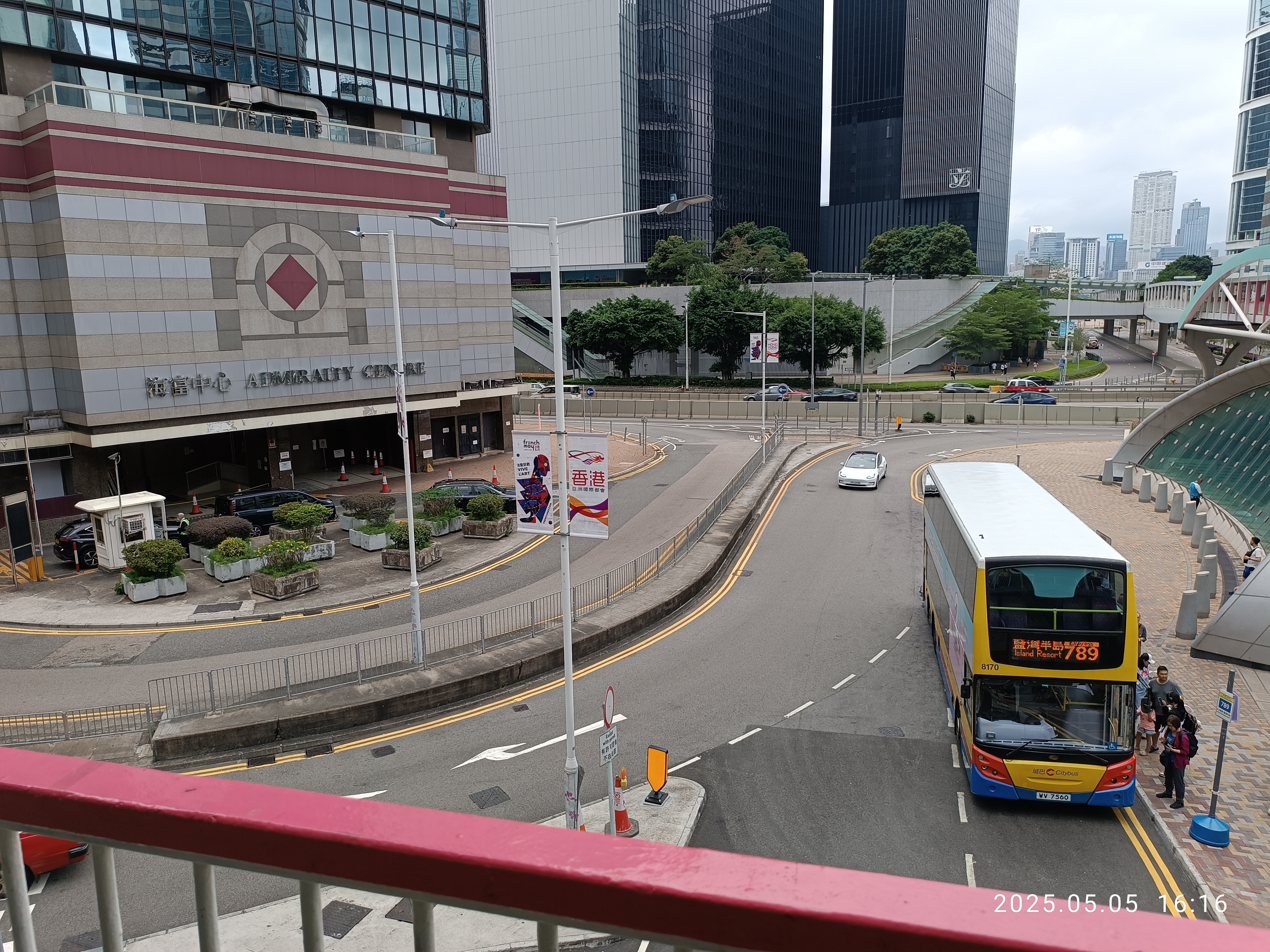

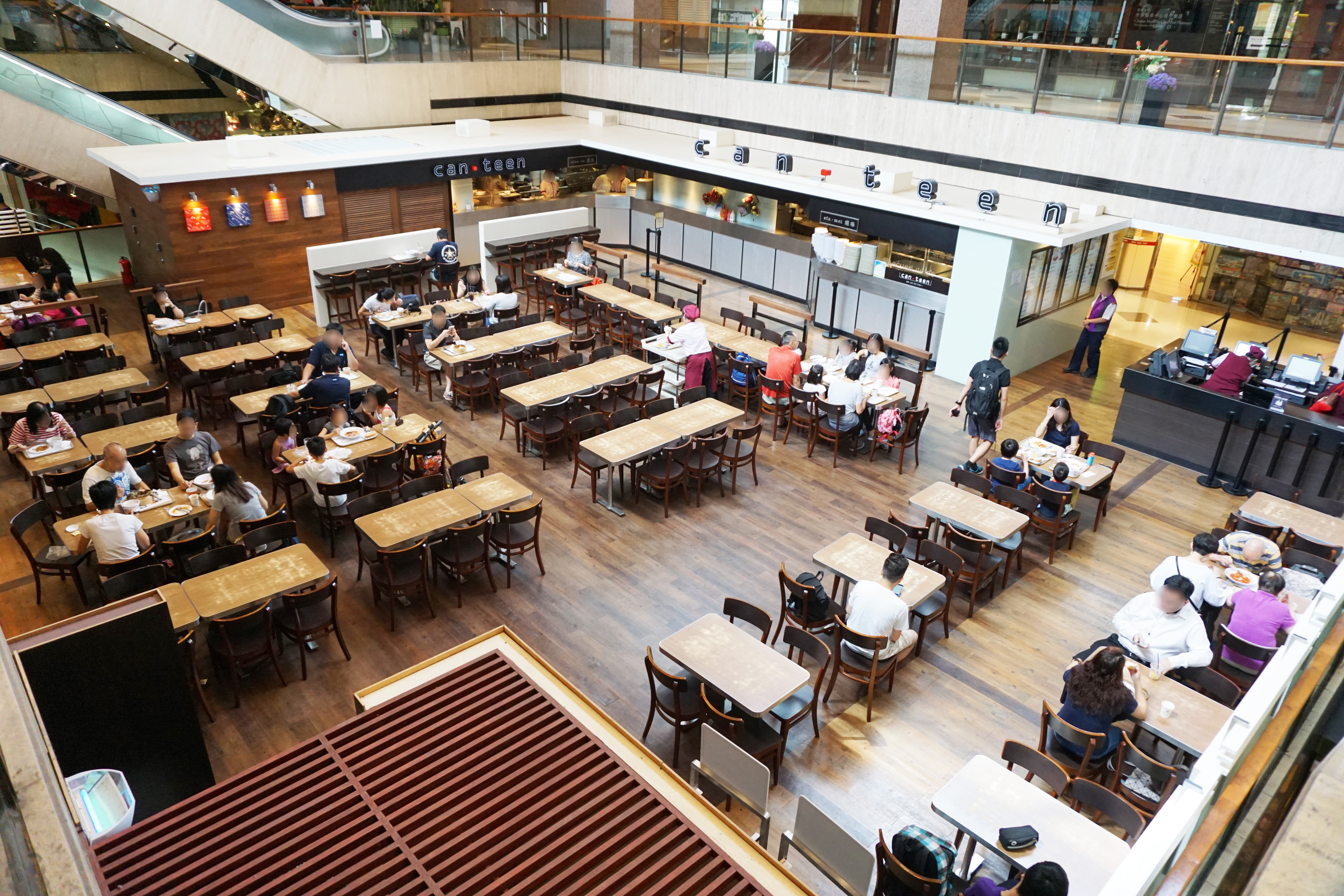

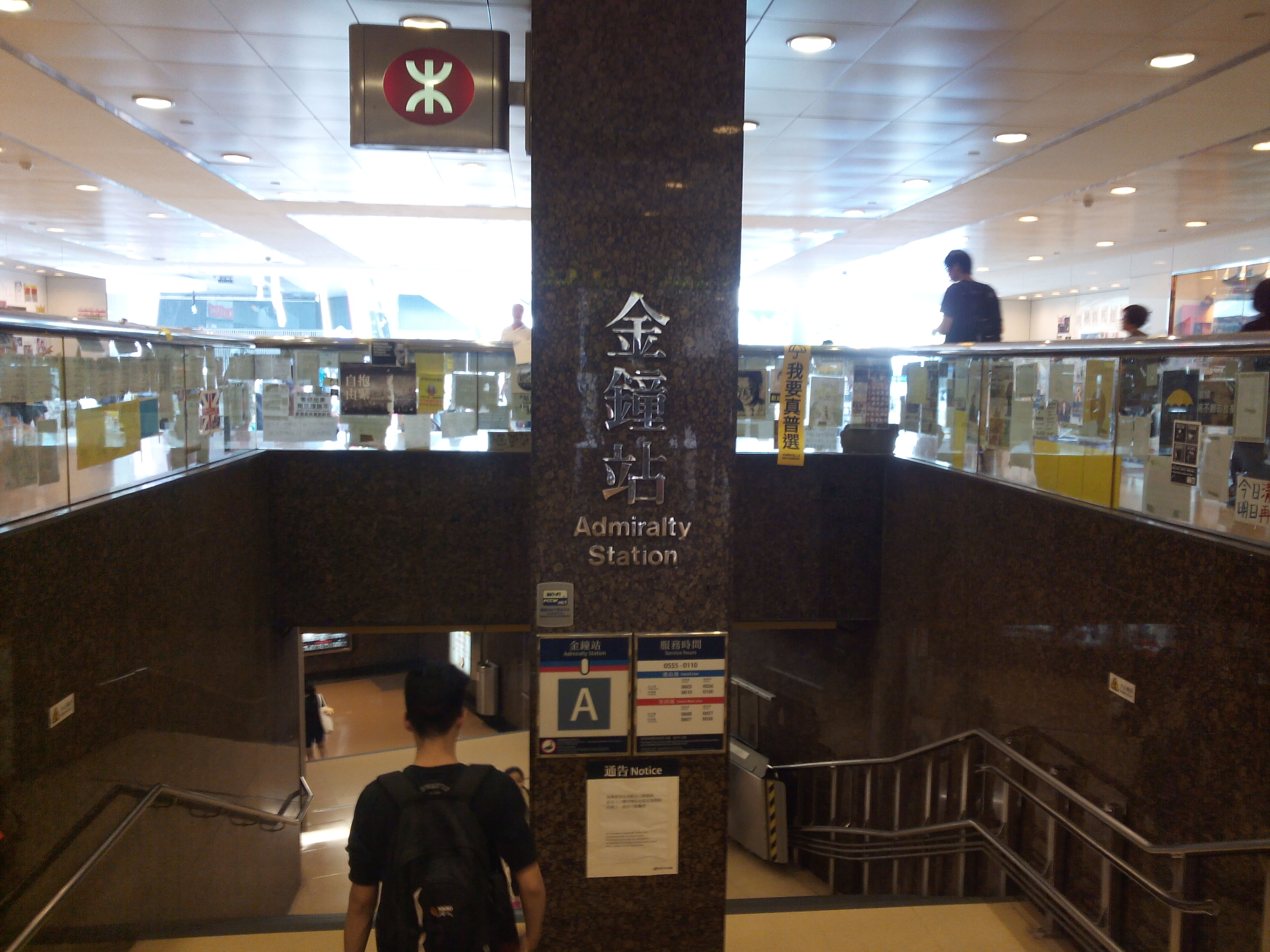
