= Harcourt Road =

Road in Admiralty, Hong Kong

Coordinates: 22.28085°N 114.16355°E

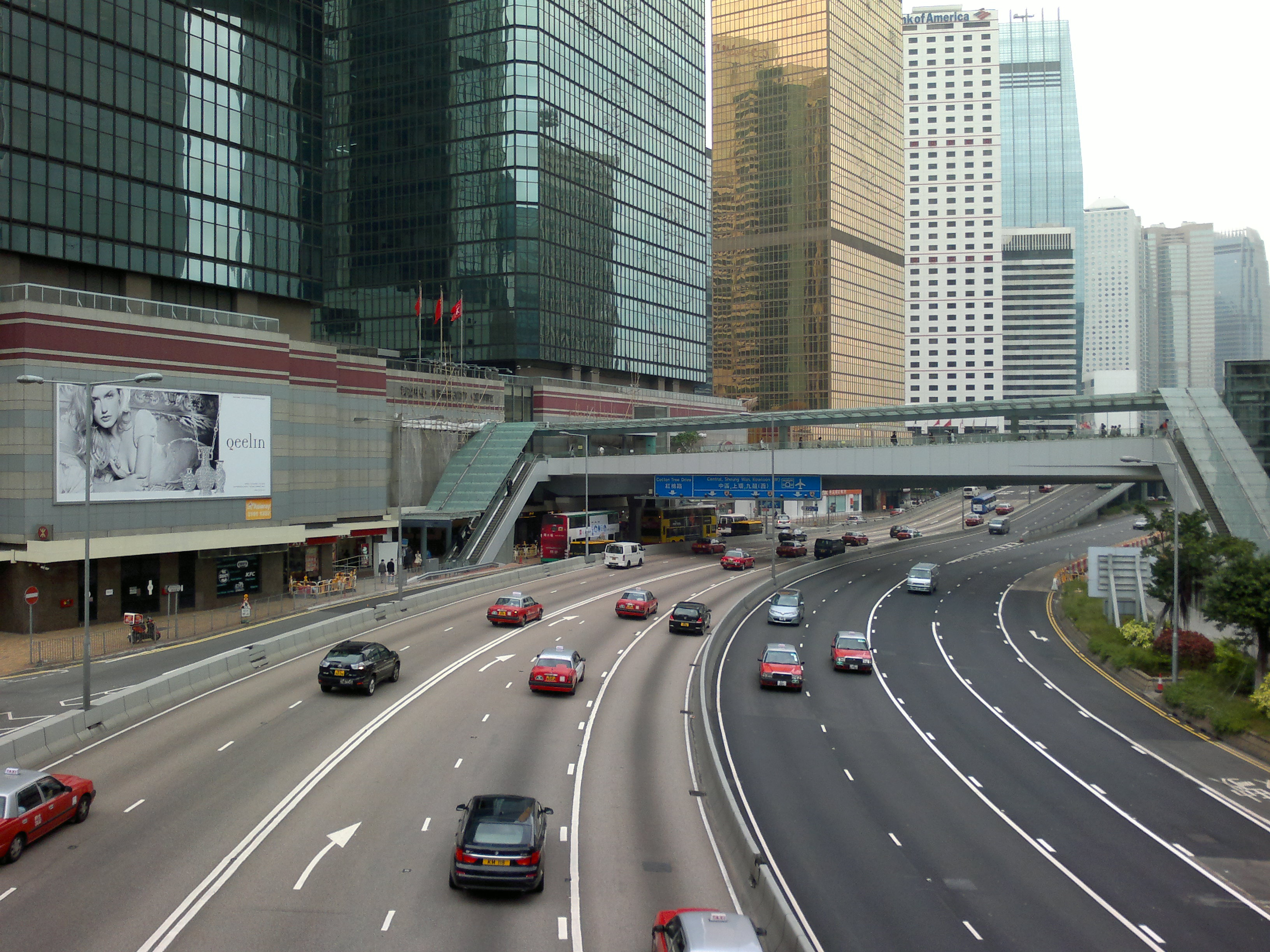
- Harcourt Road in November 2011, buildings include Bank of America Tower (Left)
- Interactive map of Harcourt Road
- Native name: 夏慤道 (Yue Chinese)
- Namesake: Cecil Harcourt
- Location: Admiralty, Hong Kong
- East end: Gloucester Road
- West end: Connaught Road Central

Harcourt Road
- Traditional Chinese: 夏慤道
- Simplified Chinese: 夏悫道
Transcriptions
Standard Mandarin
- Hanyu Pinyin: Xiàquè dào
Yue: Cantonese
- Yale Romanization: Ha6 kok3 dou6
- Jyutping: Haa6 kok3 dou6

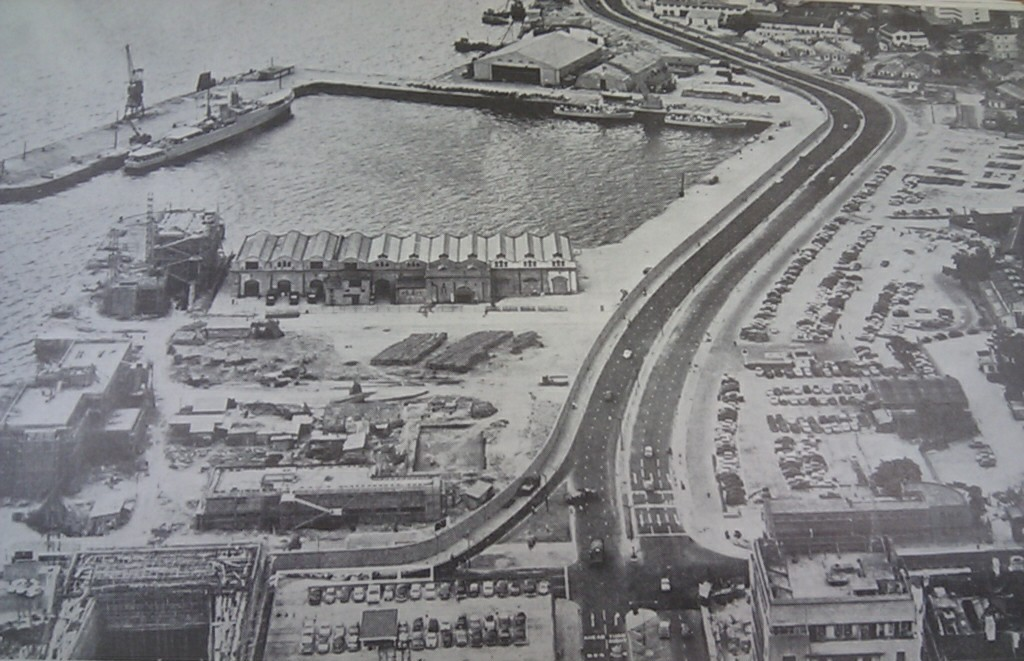
Harcourt Road in 1961–1963, Admiralty Dock (Naval Dockyard-Tidal Pool) still exists, but the Boat Pool (above) is already filled with rocks to become a road.

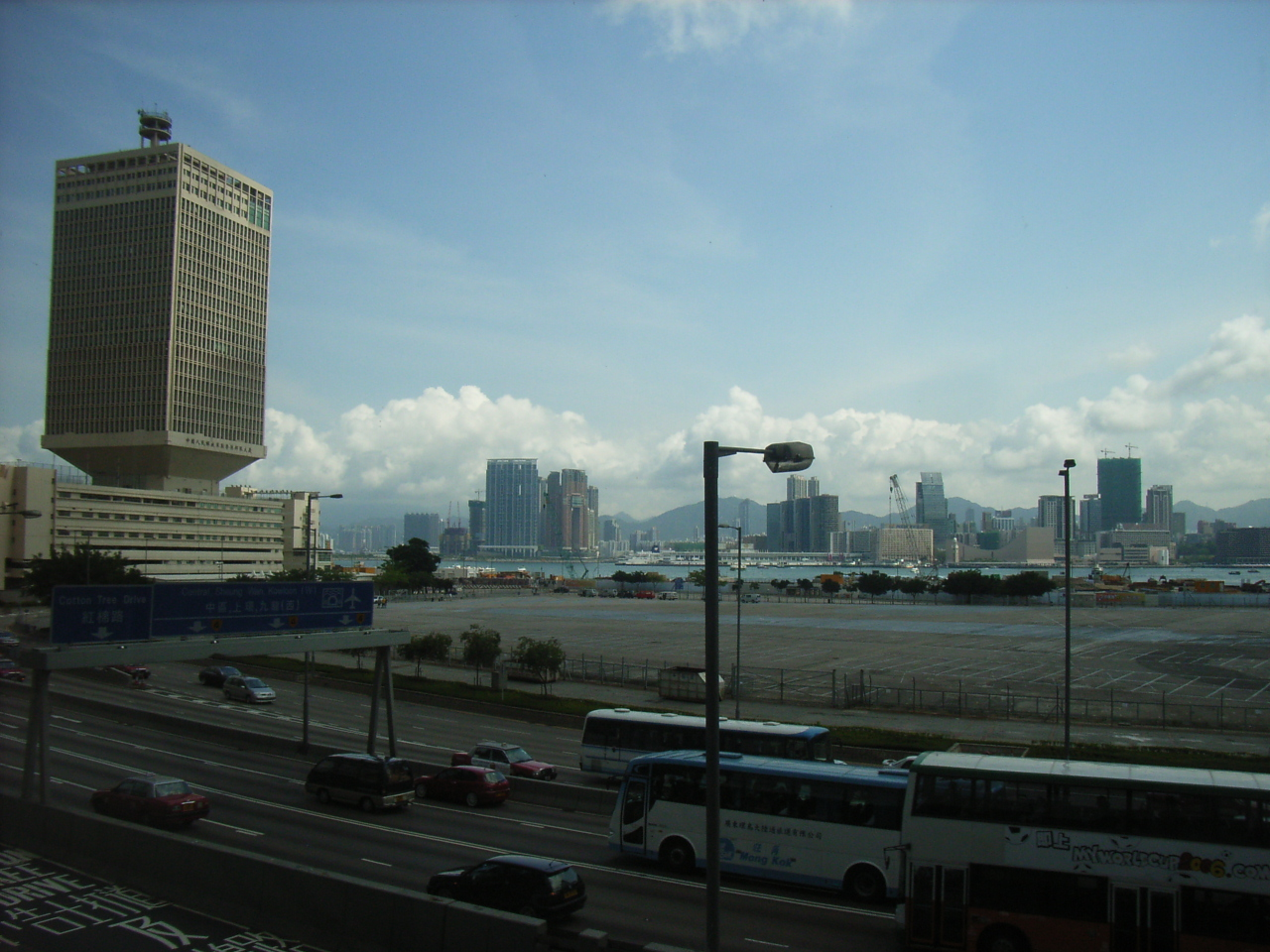
A view of Harcourt Road in May 2006, with the still-undeveloped Tamar site.

Harcourt Road (Chinese: 夏慤道; Jyutping: haa6 kok3 dou6) is a major highway in Admiralty, Hong Kong, connecting Central with Wan Chai. It starts at Murray Road, and ends at Arsenal Street. The road is 780 metres (approx. half a mile) in length, and carries four lanes of traffic on either side. The section of Harcourt Road running westbound between Rodney Street and Cotton Tree Drive features a frontage road.

== History ==
Following the colonisation of Hong Kong in the early 1840s, the present-day Admiralty was intended to be a military complex, with the naval base situated on the seafront, and the army barracks on the hillside. This left a rather large, elongated piece of land between the two, and the gap was filled in the 1870s in the form of the Admiralty Dock. Prior to its construction, the then governor Sir Arthur Kennedy proposed running a narrow public road through this empty stretch of land, but this was rejected by military officials on the grounds that it would compromise military secrecy. Kennedy Road in the Mid-Levels was built instead.

After World War II, the naval strength of the British Empire in the Far East diminished, and the land upon which the Admiralty Dock had been built was returned to the government. The Dock finally ceased operating in November 1959, and was demolished soon after. Due to the rapid development of Central and Wan Chai at that time, traffic congestion became a frequent problem in the area, and diverting traffic uphill to Kennedy Road did not provide an adequate solution.

The solution was to build a new major thoroughfare on the land reclaimed from the demolished Admiralty Dock. The resultant Harcourt Road was built in 1961, and opened to the public that same year. It is named after Cecil Harcourt, who was the de facto Governor of Hong Kong, following its liberation from the Japanese in 1945, until 1946.

Within the first six months of the road's completion, 13 traffic accidents occurred on the same curve in the road. On 13 August 1962, a speed limit was introduced, stipulating that traffic must not exceed 35 km/h (22 mph) when passing the curve – this became the first use of speed limiting in Hong Kong.

In January 2019, the Central–Wan Chai Bypass opened, providing a parallel expressway route to Harcourt Road, Gloucester Road, Victoria Park Road, and Connaught Road Central.

== Harcourt Road Flyover ==
The Harcourt Road Flyover at the western part of the road opened on 19 April 1966. To link Harcourt Road with Queen's Road East and Garden Road, the Albany Nullah was decked over, and a new road called Kapok Drive (now Cotton Tree Drive) was built. These flyovers and slip roads opened in the late 1960s.

== Events ==
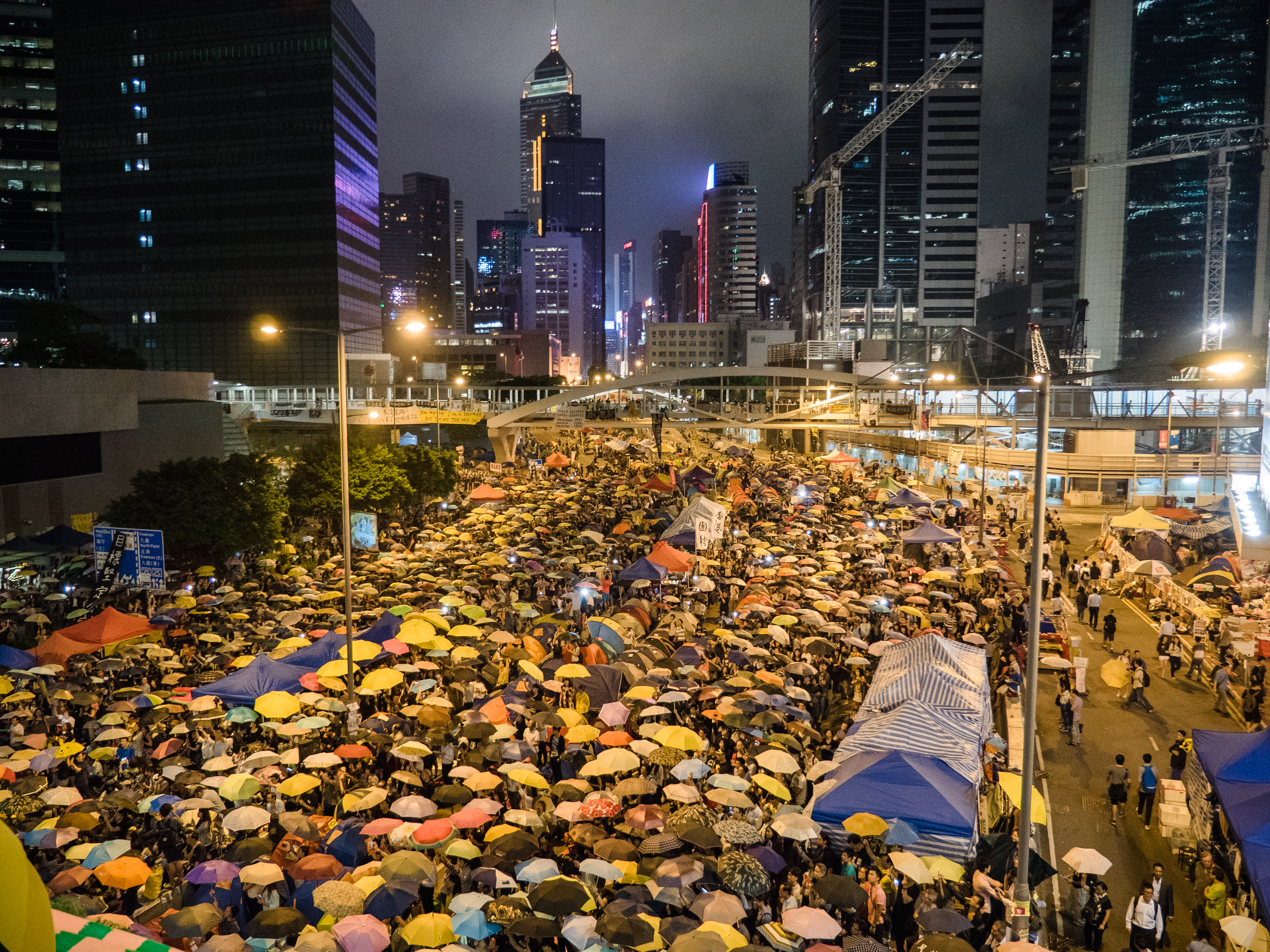
Protesters occupying Harcourt Road in October 2014.

From 28 September 2014 to 11 December 2014, the Umbrella Revolution took place. The section of Harcourt Road near the Admiralty MTR station, and the Government and Legislative Council Complex, transformed into Umbrella Square; it was occupied by pro-democracy protesters for 79 days.

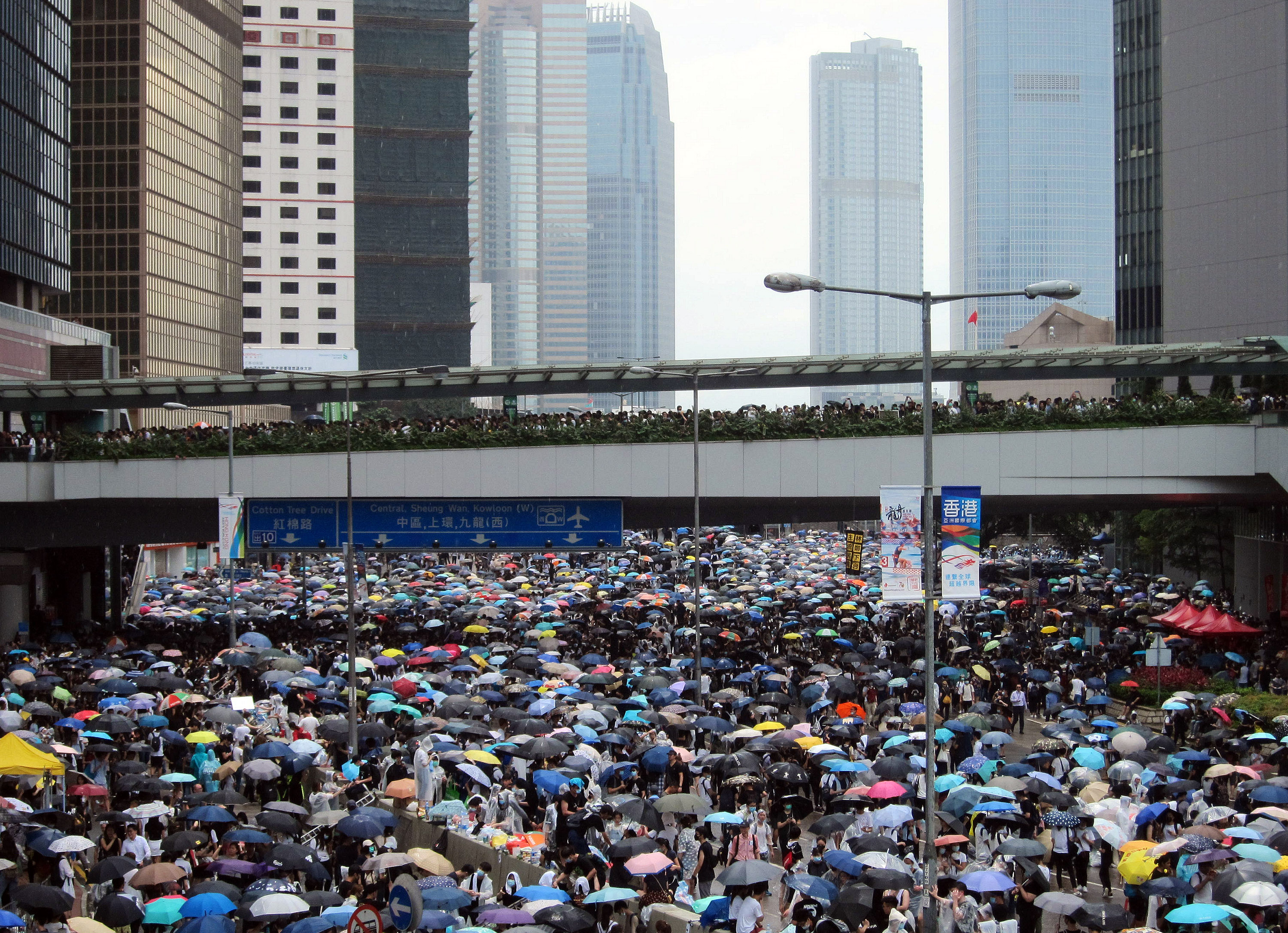
Protesters on Harcourt Road on 12 June 2019, adjacent to the Central Government Complex

On 12 June 2019, protests took place on Harcourt Road to oppose the extradition bill to China.

== See also ==
- List of streets and roads in Hong Kong
- Hennessy Road
- Bank of America Tower

Preceded by Gloucester Road	Hong Kong Route 4 Harcourt Road	Succeeded by Connaught Road Central
