= Taikoo Hui =

Taikoo Hui or Taigu Hui (simplified Chinese: 太古汇; traditional Chinese: 太古匯) may refer to:

- Taikoo Hui Guangzhou, a multi-use building complex in Guangzhou, China
- HKRI Taikoo Hui, a mixed use development in Shanghai, China

== See also ==
- Tai Koo (disambiguation)
- Taikoo Li (disambiguation)
- Swire Properties
