= Taikoo Li =

Taikoo Li or Taigu Li (Chinese: 太古里) may refer to:

- Taikoo Li Sanlitun, Beijing
- Sino-Ocean Taikoo Li Chengdu

== See also ==
- Tai Koo (disambiguation)
- Taikoo Hui (disambiguation)
- Swire Properties
