= Swire Hotels =

Hotel company

Swire Hotels 太古酒店
- Industry: Hospitality
- Founded: 2008
- Headquarters: Hong Kong
- Area served: Hong Kong, Mainland China
- Key people: Toby Smith, (Deputy Chairman)
- Parent: Swire Pacific
- Website: swirehotels.com

Swire Hotels is a division of Swire Properties Limited, a subsidiary of Swire Pacific Limited, a blue chip company quoted on the Hong Kong Stock Exchange.

Swire Hotels was formed in 2008 to create and manage small luxury hotels in Hong Kong and Mainland China. It manages two hotel brands – the "House Collective" and EAST.

== Hotels ==
=== The Opposite House, Beijing ===
The Opposite House is Swire Hotels' first hotel which opened in March 2008 in Beijing's Sanlitun district. The hotel is an integral part of Sanlitun Village, an open-plan shopping center also developed by Swire Properties. Designed by the Japanese architect Kengo Kuma, the hotel has 99 rooms, including a two-floor penthouse, two restaurants and two bars.

The ground floor lobby houses rotating art exhibits, while other sculptures and installations are permanently on display in the public areas.

The name of the hotel comes from the translation of a Chinese word, which historically is used to describe the building located opposite the main house in a courtyard where esteemed guests would stay. The Opposite House was closed in 2024.

=== The Upper House, Hong Kong ===
The Upper House is located above Pacific Place in Admiralty, Hong Kong Opened in 2009, the hotel features 117 rooms including 21 suites and two penthouses.

The hotel was designed by Hong Kong–based architect Andre Fu. Art appears prominently in the hotel interior; 350 original artworks are showcased within the premises, including Hiroshiwata Sawada's 40-metre tall "Rise" steel sculpture. The Upper House is also home to Café Gray Deluxe.

=== The Temple House, Chengdu ===
The Temple House is the third property by The House Collective. Opened in 2015, it is situated in Sino-Ocean Taikoo Li Chengdu in the heart of Jinjiang District.

Bitieshi at The Temple House is a restored Qing dynasty courtyard that houses a library and gallery. There are 100 rooms and 42 residences designed by UK-based Make Architects. The hotel has an urban day spa MI XUN and TEAHOUSE.

=== EAST, Hong Kong ===
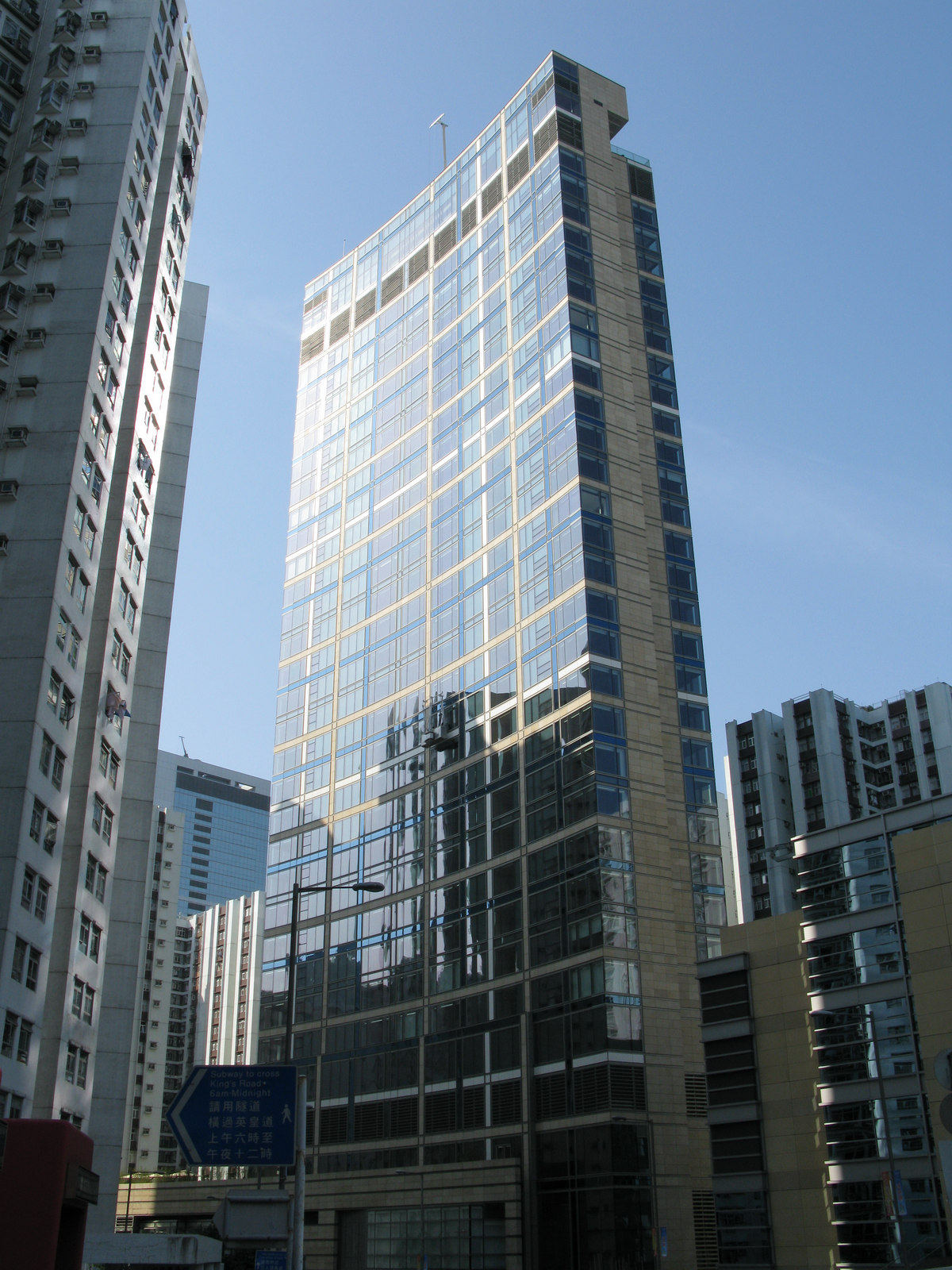
EAST, a hotel in Taikoo Shing, Hong Kong

EAST, Hong Kong is located at Island East, a development by Swire Properties. Opened in early 2010, it was the first of Swire Hotels' EAST brand.

The hotel features 346 rooms and suites, one restaurant and a rooftop bar. It was designed by Hong Kong–based architect Wong Tung & Partners and interior design studio CL3 Architects Ltd.

EAST, Hong Kong houses a number of art pieces by local and international artists including Sui Jianguo from China, Lincoln Seligman from London and Danny Lee from Hong Kong.

=== EAST, Beijing ===
EAST, Beijing is a business hotel located in the Chaoyang district of Beijing, China. Opened in September 2012, it is situated within INDIGO in Jiangtai – a mixed-use property developed by Swire Properties Limited and Sino-Ocean Land Holdings Limited. The brand's name refers back to the hotels' location in the eastern districts of Beijing and Hong Kong. The hotel was designed by the British architecture firm Benoy, which also designed INDIGO.

The hotel is a member of Summit Hotels & Resorts, and has 369 rooms.

=== EAST, Miami ===
This is the first hotel in the United States under the EAST brand. Located in downtown Miami, the hotel is part of Swire Properties' Brickell City Centre. Designed by Miami-based architects Arquitectonica, with interiors by New York's Clodagh Design, this hotel has 263 guest rooms and 89 residence suites.

EAST, Miami has 3 restaurants designed by Los Angeles–based firm Studio Collective including South American restaurant Quinto, rooftop bar Sugar and café and bar Domain.

=== Swire Restaurants ===
Swire Restaurants was founded in 2013 to manage standalone restaurants. Restaurants in their portfolio include The Continental, Plat du Jour, PUBLIC and Mr & Mrs Fox. The group also operates a centralised kitchen called S.H.A.R.K..
