= INDIGO, Beijing =

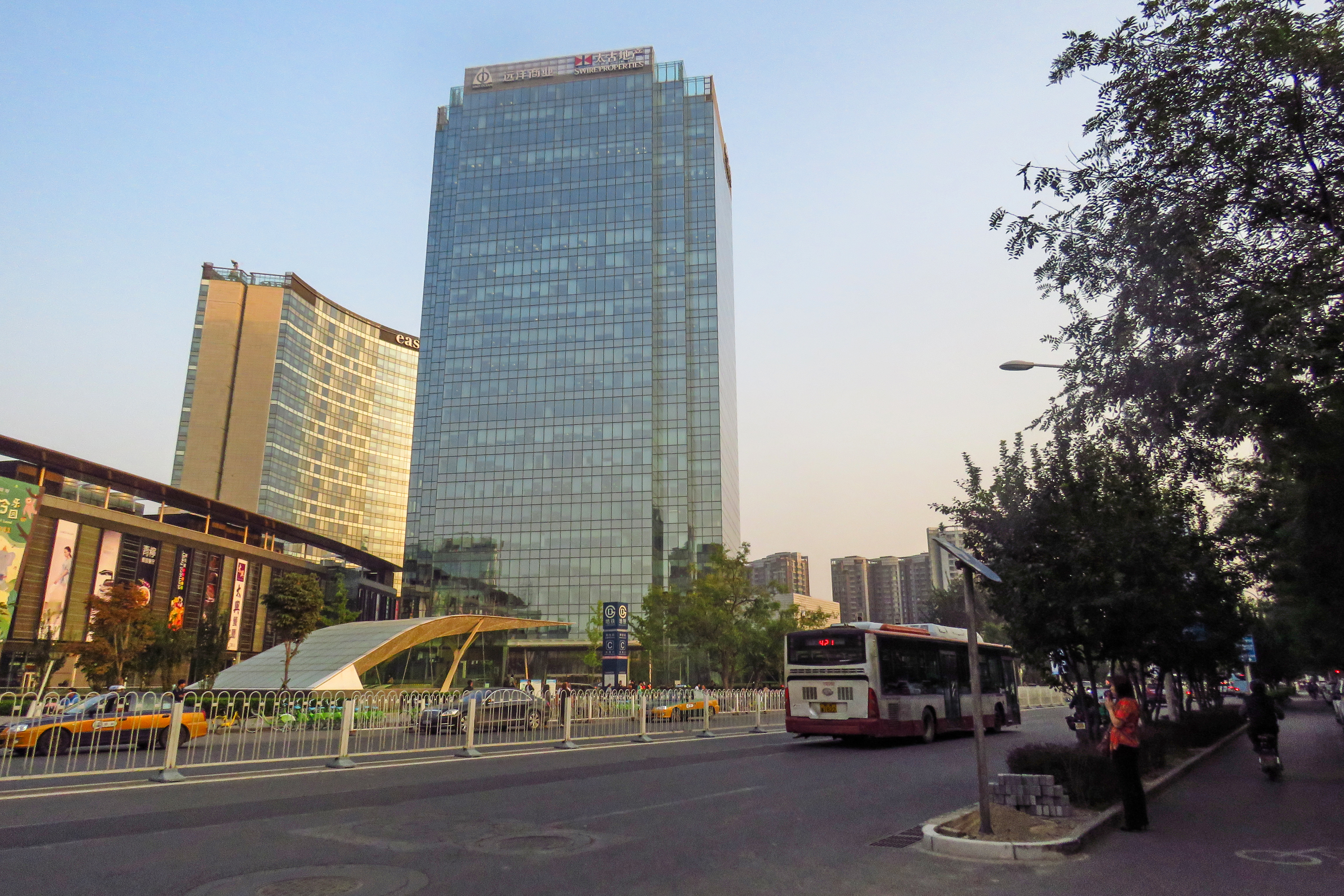
- View of INDIGO from Jiuxianqiao Road
- Location: Beijing, China
- Coordinates: 39°58′07″N 116°29′08″E
- Address: 18 Jiuxianqiao Road, Jiangtai Subdistrict, Chaoyang District
- Opened: 2012
- Developer: Swire Properties, Sino-Ocean Group
- Num. of stores: Over 170 shops and restaurants
- Floor area: 939,000 sq ft (87,200 m^{2})
- Parking: 1,245 parking spaces
- Website: www.indigobeijing.com

INDIGO, Beijing (Chinese: 颐堤港), is a mixed use development in Jiangtai Subdistrict, Chaoyang District in Beijing, China. It comprises a large indoor shopping mall, a 23-storey office tower called One INDIGO, as well as a 369-room business and lifestyle hotel EAST, Beijing (北京东隅) run by Swire Hotels.

== Location ==
INDIGO, Beijing is located between the 4th and 5th ring roads in North Eastern Beijing, with the development located approximately a 15-minute drive from Beijing's Central Business District and a 15-minute drive from Beijing Capital International Airport. The development is also directly connected to Line 14 of the Beijing Subway, with visitors recommended to alight at exit C of Jiangtai station. INDIGO, Beijing is also easily accessible by public bus, with the closest bus stop Jiuxianqiao (酒仙桥), and is served by Beijing Bus numbers 401, 402, 408, 418, 621, 656, 659, 677, 688, 701, 909, 946, 955, 973, 976, 988, 991 and Yuntong 107.

== History and construction ==
Designed by architects Benoy, the centre officially opened in 2012. INDIGO is developed by Hong Kong–based Swire Properties and partner. The retail mall is approximately 940,000 sq ft (87,000 sqm) and features an outdoor park and a large indoor children's playground which is situated under a large glass roof. Large scale installations for Christmas and Chinese New Year are often installed here and are popular among local and expatriate families with young children In 2018, Indigo ran a NASA Neighborhood Earth experience in the outdoor park.

The hotel EAST, Beijing opened in late September 2012 and features paperless check-in as well as panoramic views.

== Gallery ==
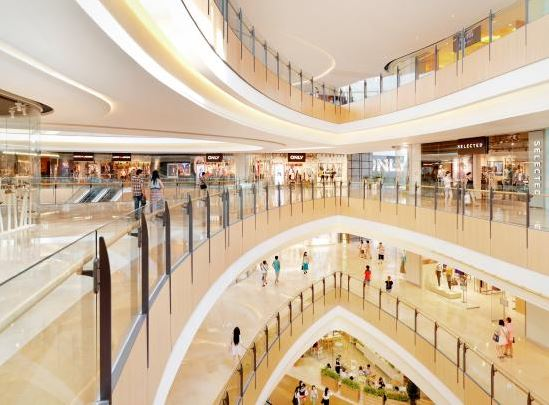
Interior of INDIGO Mall

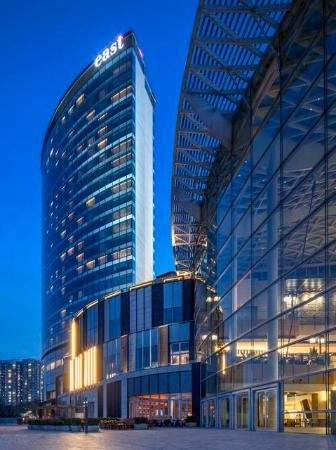
EAST Hotel at Night

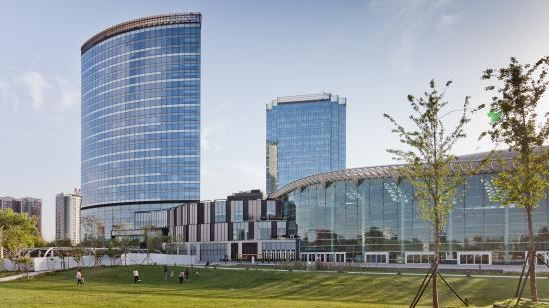
A View of INDIGO mall, One INDIGO and EAST Hotel
