= Brickell City Centre station =

Miami Metromover station

Brickell City Centre
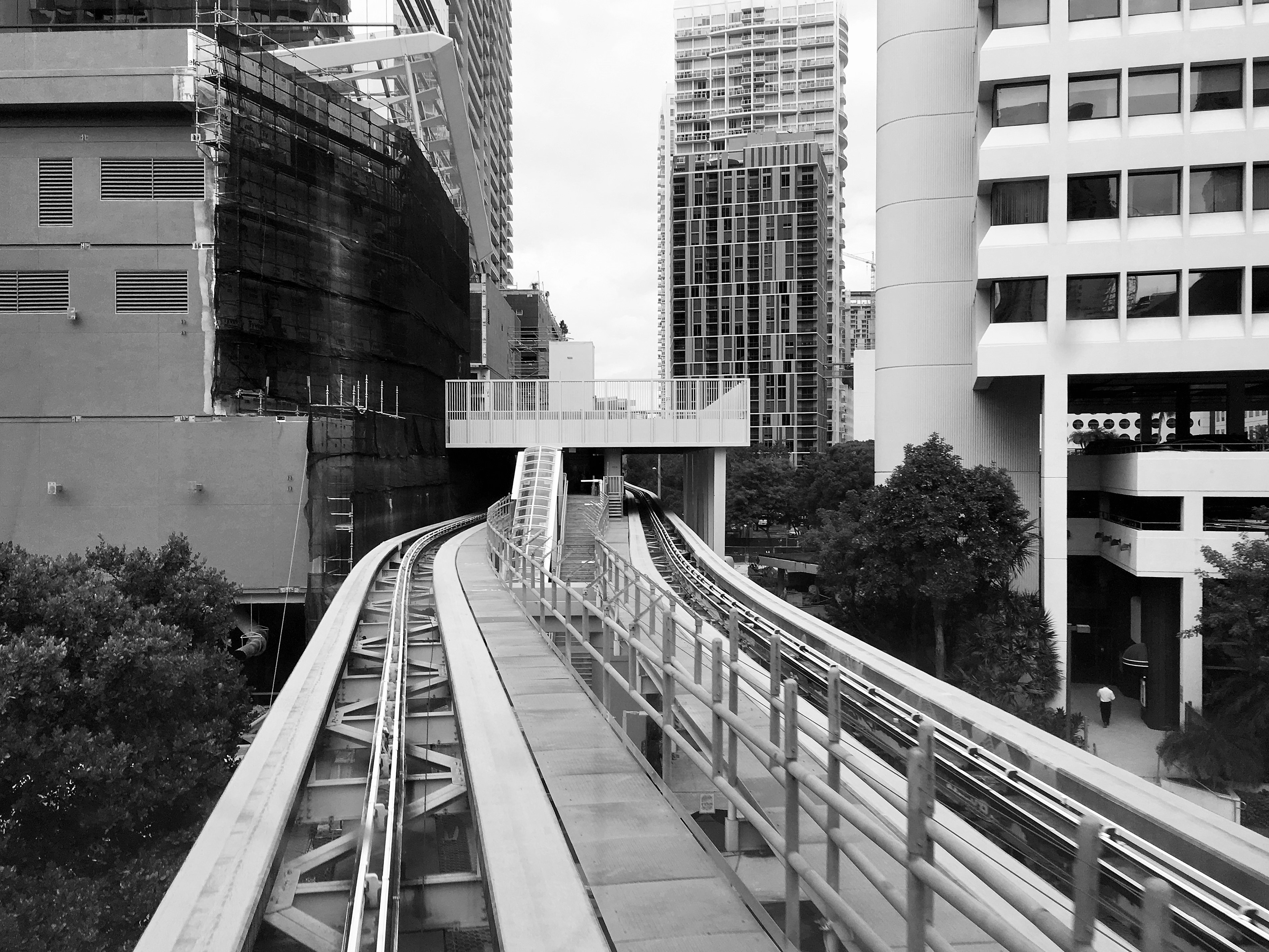
- Looking north to station in 2015, Brickell City Centre under construction.

General information
- Location: 59 SE Eighth Street; Miami, Florida 33131
- Coordinates: 25°46′0″N 80°11′31″W
- Owner: Miami-Dade County
- Platforms: 1 island platform
- Tracks: 2

Construction
- Accessible: Yes

History
- Opened: May 26, 1994
- Rebuilt: 2014-15

Services
Preceding station	Miami-Dade Transit	Following station
Tenth Street Promenade toward Financial District	Brickell Loop	Fifth Street toward Downtown
Location

Brickell City Centre, formerly known and still referred to as Eighth Street, is a Metromover station in the Brickell district of Downtown, Miami, Florida, 1 mile (1.6 km) east of Little Havana. This station is located on the Tamiami Trail (Southeast Eighth Street/US 41) near First Avenue. It opened to service May 26, 1994. Eighth Street station and its grounds received significant upgrades as part of Swire Properties' $1.05 billion Brickell City Centre project throughout its closure from August 2014 to November 2015. While the station reopened in 2015, the third floor connection to Brickell City Centre remained closed through October 2016.
