= Citygate Outlets =

Commercial complex in Hong Kong

Coordinates: 22.28953°N 113.94059°E

- 東薈城名店倉

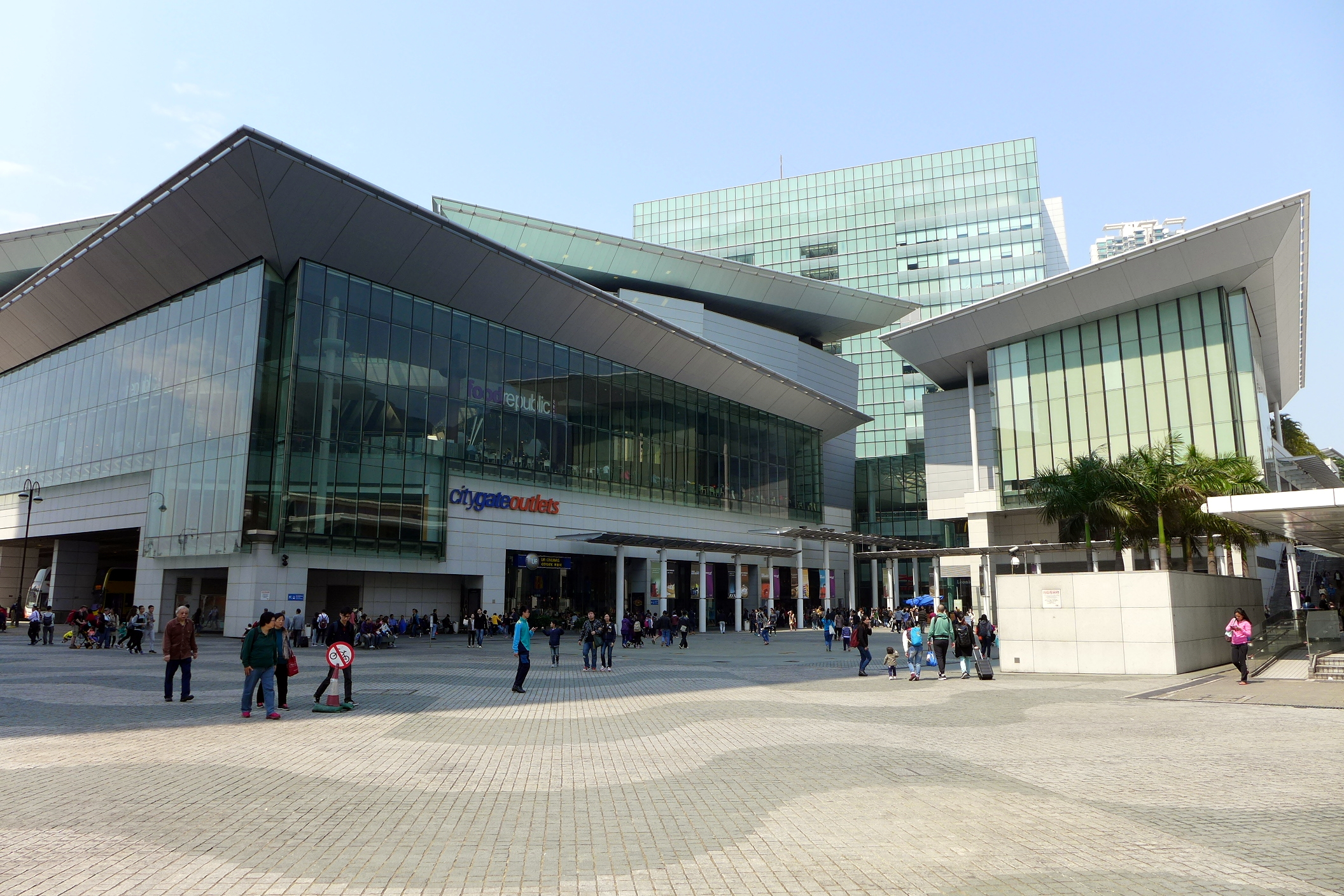
- Address: 20 Tat Tung Road; Tung Chung, Lantau Island
- Opened: 8 April 2000; 26 years ago
- Developer: Newfoundworld Investment Holdings Limited
- Manager: Swire Properties Management Limited
- Architect: Anthony Ng Architects Limited; Wilkinson & Cilley Limited
- Num. of stores: 190+
- Floor area: 1,466,000 sq ft (136,200 m^{2})
- Floors: 9
- Parking: 1,280 spaces
- Public transit: Tung Chung station
- Website: citygateoutlets.com.hk

Citygate
- Traditional Chinese: 東薈城名店倉
- Simplified Chinese: 东荟城名店仓
Transcriptions
Standard Mandarin
- Hanyu Pinyin: Dōnghuìchéng
Yue: Cantonese
- Jyutping: dung1 wai3 sing4

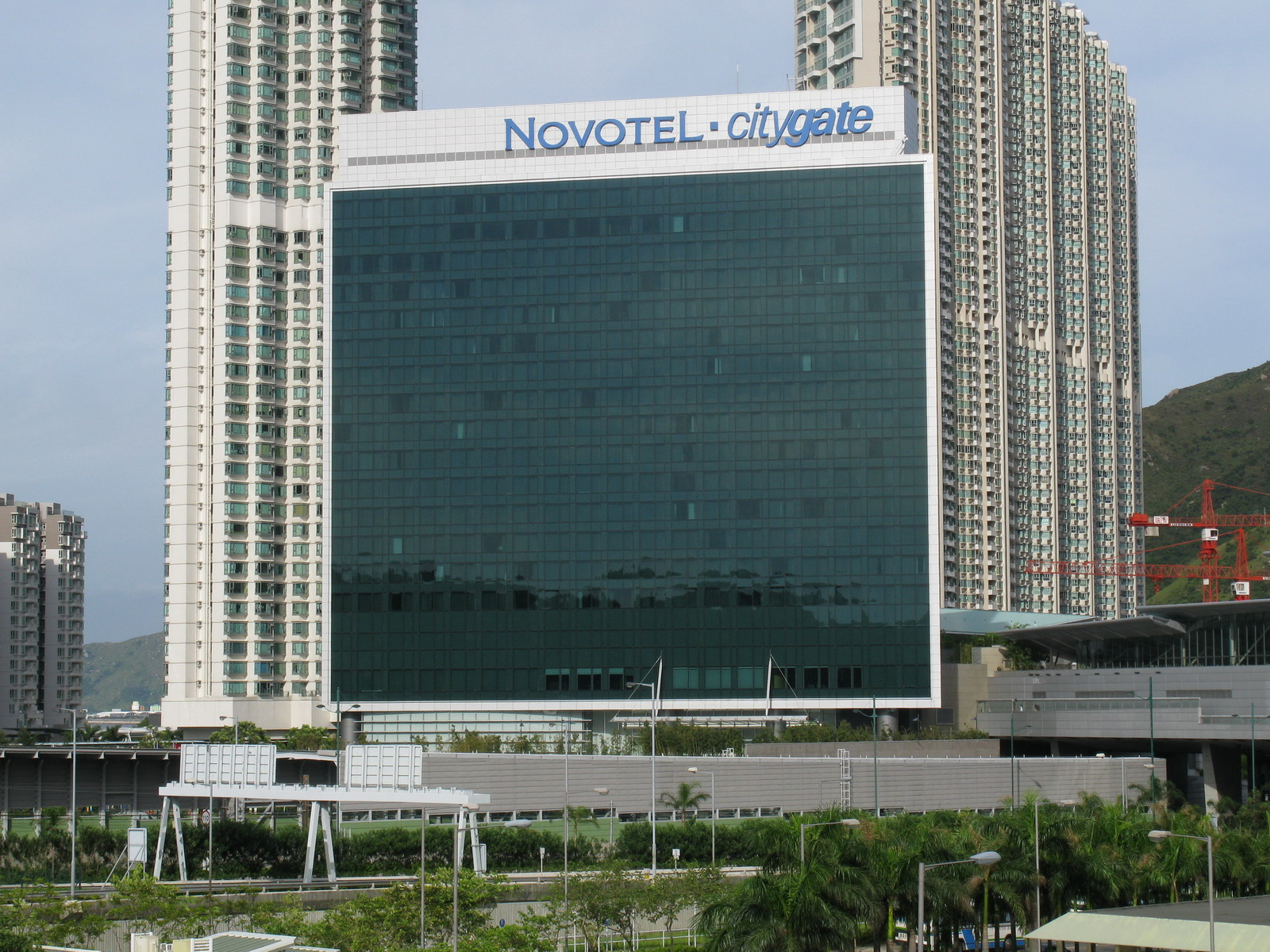
Novotel Citygate hotel

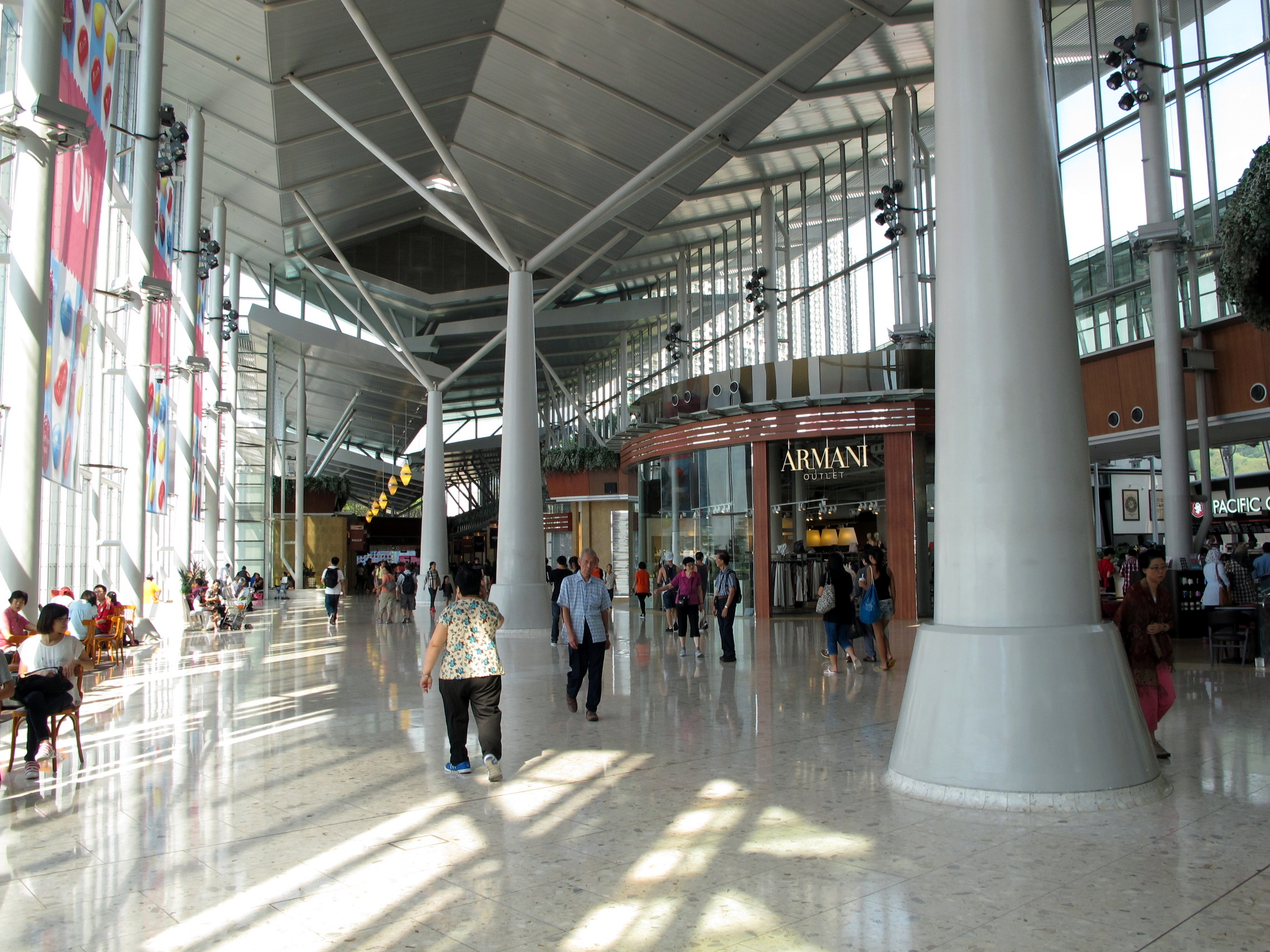
Shopping arcade bridge

Citygate Outlets (Chinese: 東薈城名店倉) is a commercial complex at the town centre of Tung Chung, Lantau Island, Hong Kong. It comprises an outlet mall named Citygate Outlets, a Grade A office building named Citygate One, and two hotels. It is owned by Newfoundworld Investment Holdings Limited, a consortium of Hang Lung Group, Henderson Land Development, Sun Hung Kai Properties, New World Development, and Swire Properties, and is managed by Swire Properties. The mall officially opened on April 8, 2000, while the hotel section, named Novotel Citygate Hong Kong and Hong Kong Silveri-MGallery, which opened in early 2006 and May 2022, respectively.

When it first opened for business in 2000, the shopping centre component was simply known as Citygate. Following a major shift in market position, the mall renamed itself Citygate Outlets in August 2006.

== History ==
Construction commenced in 1995, and was completed in 1999. The entire complex is built on reclaimed land. The combined retail-office complex is a key feature of Tung Chung New Town, which was designed and built as a complement to the construction of Chek Lap Kok International Airport, also on reclaimed land. Phase I of the Citygate shopping centre opened in April 2000.

It was developed, and is presently owned by, Newfoundworld Investment Holdings Limited, a consortium of Swire Properties, Hang Lung Group, Henderson Land Development, New World Development, and Sun Hung Kai Properties. Each company owns a 20% stake in the venture. The Citygate Outlets shopping centre is managed by Swire Properties Management Limited.

The 440-room Novotel Citygate hotel, managed by AccorHotels, opened in April 2006. It targets business travelers, housing a business centre as well as conference facilities.

The phase 2 extension opened in 2019. With the opening of its new extension, the Mall has doubled in size and now houses over 150 international brands offering up to 90%-year-round discounts; with a host of retailers launching their first outlet store in Hong Kong. The Mall also features a food court and al fresco eateries with 40 food and beverage outlets, and a 600-seat cinema.

== Location ==
Citygate Outlets is in Tung Chung, above Tung Chung MTR station, which is the terminus of the Tung Chung line. The mall is also next door to Tung Chung bus terminus, and is directly connected to the Novotel Citygate Hong Kong hotel. Hong Kong International Airport is 10 minutes away by bus.

== Design ==
Citygate Outlets has 942,800 square feet of retail space. The Citygate complex also includes 160,000 square feet (15,000 m^{2}) of office space, as well as subterranean parking for over 1,100 cars. The 440-room Novotel Citygate Hong Kong hotel is also connected to the mall.

Citygate Outlets has made extensive use of glass and natural light. The mall features two sky-lit atriums, located at the northern and southern ends of the complex. These two atriums are connected to one another by walkways. The mall comprises five storeys, two of which are basement levels. There is a large restaurant-in-restaurant called Food Republic on the mall's topmost level. Unusually for Hong Kong, Citygate Outlets includes a large open-air piazza called The Square. One of the largest outdoor kinetic fountains in Asia is located here, and the space is often used for artistic performances, open-air exhibitions and special events.

The shopping centre spans the North Lantau Highway. Residents of the eastern half of Tung Chung must therefore walk through the shopping centre on their way to and from the railway station.

== Positioning ==
The first outlet mall in Hong Kong, Citygate Outlets is home to more than 150 international brands offering year-round discounts of 30% to 70% on designer fashion, sports, beauty, accessories, children's wear, and home items. Citygate Outlets also features a spa, trendy restaurants, and one of the largest outdoor kinetic fountains in Asia.

In 2007, Citygate Outlets won a Silver in the International Council of Shopping Centre MAXI Awards (Category Integration section). It was the first time that a mall in Asia won an ICSC MAXI Award.

== Offices ==
The development includes One Citygate, a nine-storey office building with a gross floor area of 161,400 square feet (14,990 m^{2}). Greater Bay Airlines has its head office on the 12th floor of the complex. Hong Kong Airlines has its head office on the seventh floor of the building, as did HK Express. Metrojet Limited has its head office in suites 1301 through 1306 in One Citygate.

== See also ==
- Lantau Island
