= Tai Koo =

Tai Koo (Chinese: 太古) may refer to:

- Taikoo Shing, a private housing estate in Quarry Bay, Hong Kong
- Taikoo Sugar Refinery
- Taikoo Place, a group of office buildings in Quarry Bay, Hong Kong
- Tai Koo station, a station on the Island line of the MTR, the underground railway system in Hong Kong
- The Cantonese name of Swire Group.

== See also ==
- Taikoo Hui (disambiguation)
- Taikoo Li (disambiguation)
