= Sanlitun Subdistrict =

Sanlitun Subdistrict 三里屯街道
- Subdistrict
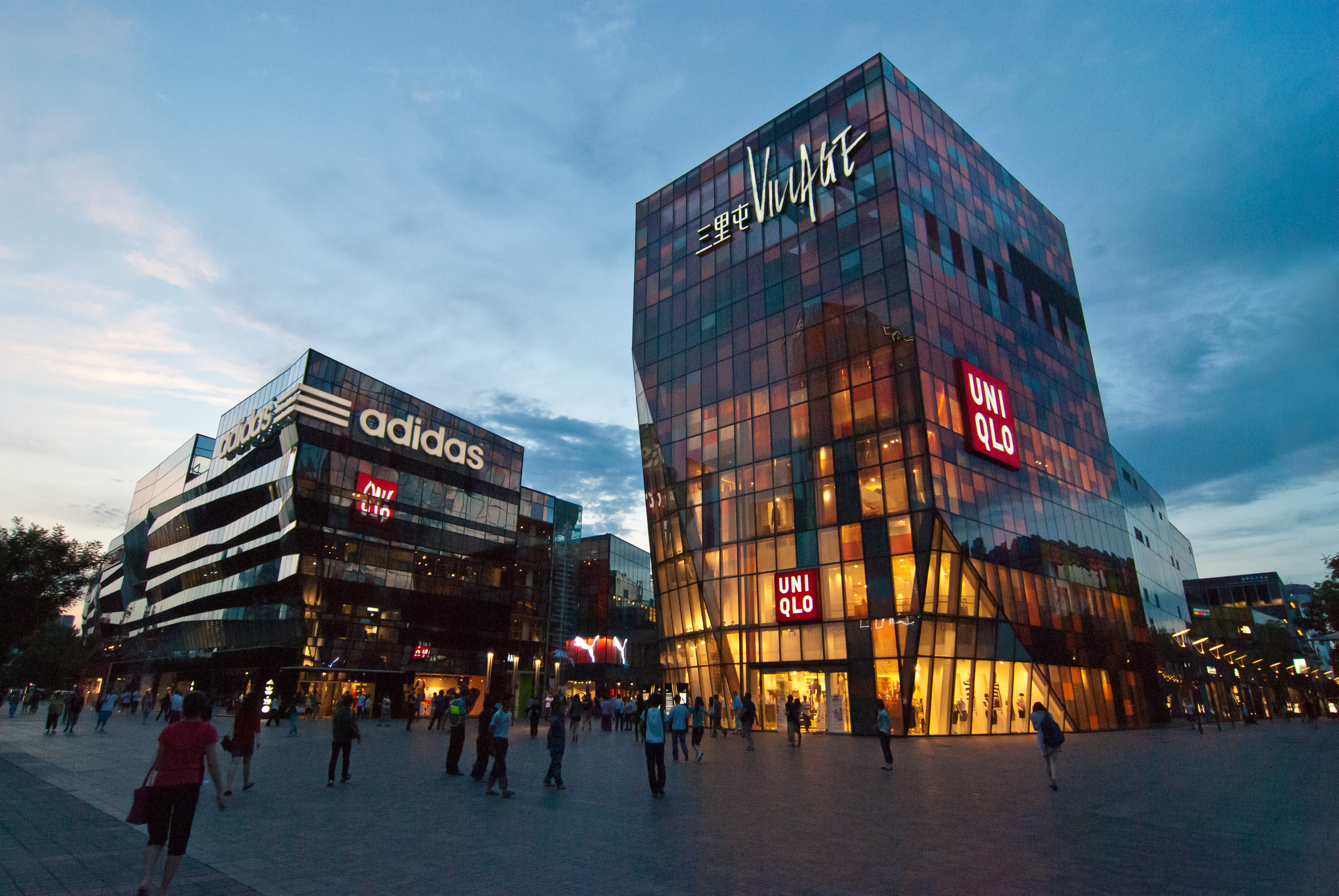
- Taikoo Li Shopping Center in Sanlitun Subdistrict, 2011

- Location within Beijing Location within China
- Coordinates: 39°56′02″N 116°27′02″E
- Country: China
- Municipality: Beijing
- District: Chaoyang

Area
  - Total: 2.9 km^{2} (1.1 sq mi)

Population (2020)
  - Total: 32,347
  - Density: 11,000/km^{2} (29,000/sq mi)
- Time zone: UTC+8 (China Standard)
- Postal code: 100027
- Area code: 010

Sanlitun Subdistrict (Chinese: 三里屯街道; pinyin: Sānlǐtún Jiēdào) is a subdistrict in the western side of Chaoyang District, Beijing, China. In the year 2020, it had a population of 32,347.

The name Sanlitun (Chinese: 三里屯; pinyin: Three-li Village) is based on the fact that at the time of the naming, during the Qing dynasty, it was three li (1.5 km) away from Dongzhimen, the nearest city gate of Beijing.

== History ==
Timeline of changes in the status of Sanlitun
Year	Status
Ming and Qing dynasty	Part of Daxing County, Shuntian Prefecture
1912	Part of East Suburban District
1949	Part of Dongsi District
1957	Created as Xingfu Sancun Subdistrict
1959	Incorporated into Chaowai Subdistrict
1976	Recreated as Revolutionary Committee of Sanlitun Subdistrict
1978	Restored as Sanlitun Subdistrict

== Administrative Division ==
As of 2021, there are 7 communities under the subdistrict:

Administrative Division Code	Community Name in English	Community Name in Simplified Chinese
110105004032	Xingfu Yicun	幸福一村
110105004033	Xingfu Ercun	幸福二村
110105004034	Beisanli	北三里
110105004036	Dongsanli	东三里
110105004037	Zhongsanli	中三里
110105004039	Baijiazhuang Xili	白家庄西里
110105004040	Zhongfangli	中纺里

== Landmark ==
- Sanlitun area
- Taikoo Li Sanlitun Shopping Center

== See also ==
- List of township-level divisions of Beijing
