= Brickell City Centre =

Shopping and mixed-use project in Miami, Florida

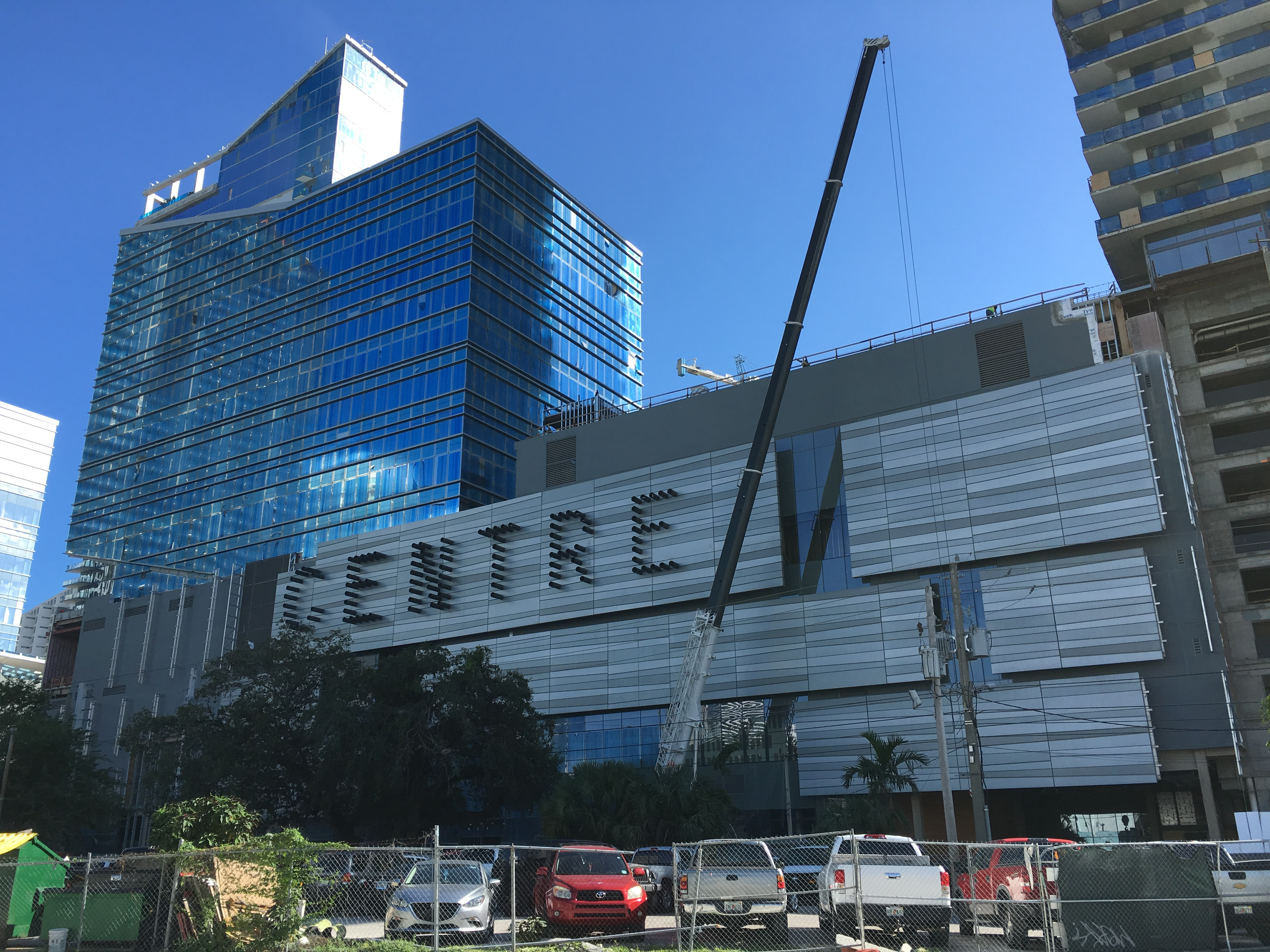
- November 2015
- Interactive map of the Brickell City Centre area

General information
- Status: Completed
- Type: Mixed use
- Location: Miami, Florida, U.S.
- Coordinates: 25.767159°N 80.193087°W
- Construction started: 2012-14
- Completed: November 3, 2016
- Cost: US$1 billion+ (phase 1)

Height
- Antenna spire: ~500 ft (150 m)
- Roof: ~500 ft (150 m)

Technical details
- Floor count: ~45 each
- Floor area: 5,400,000 square feet (500,000 m^{2}) (phase 1)

Design and construction
- Architect: Arquitectonica
- Developer: Swire Properties

Brickell City Centre is a large mixed-use complex consisting of two residential high-rise towers, two office buildings, a high-rise hotel, and an interconnected five-story shopping mall and lifestyle center covering 9 acres (36,000 m^{2}) located in the Brickell district of Downtown Miami, Florida. Situated at the junction of Miami Avenue and Eighth Street, it spans up to five blocks to the west of Brickell Avenue and to the south of the Miami River. Contrary to the name, the development is not in the traditional downtown Miami city centre, but in the more recently redeveloped financial district of Brickell. The retail shopping and lifestyle center is operated by Simon Malls.

Brickell City Centre, which cost an estimated $1.05 billion, was completed in 2016. It was first proposed during the real estate bubble of the 2000s, but then cancelled during the economic downturn following the Great Recession. It was revived in 2012 with enough acreage to qualify for Special Area Plan (SAP) zoning with construction beginning by year's end. The hotel and residential towers, as well as some office space, opened in 2016. Phased retail openings started in November 2016. By the mid 2020s, the retail space of the mall approached 100% leased.

== Overview ==
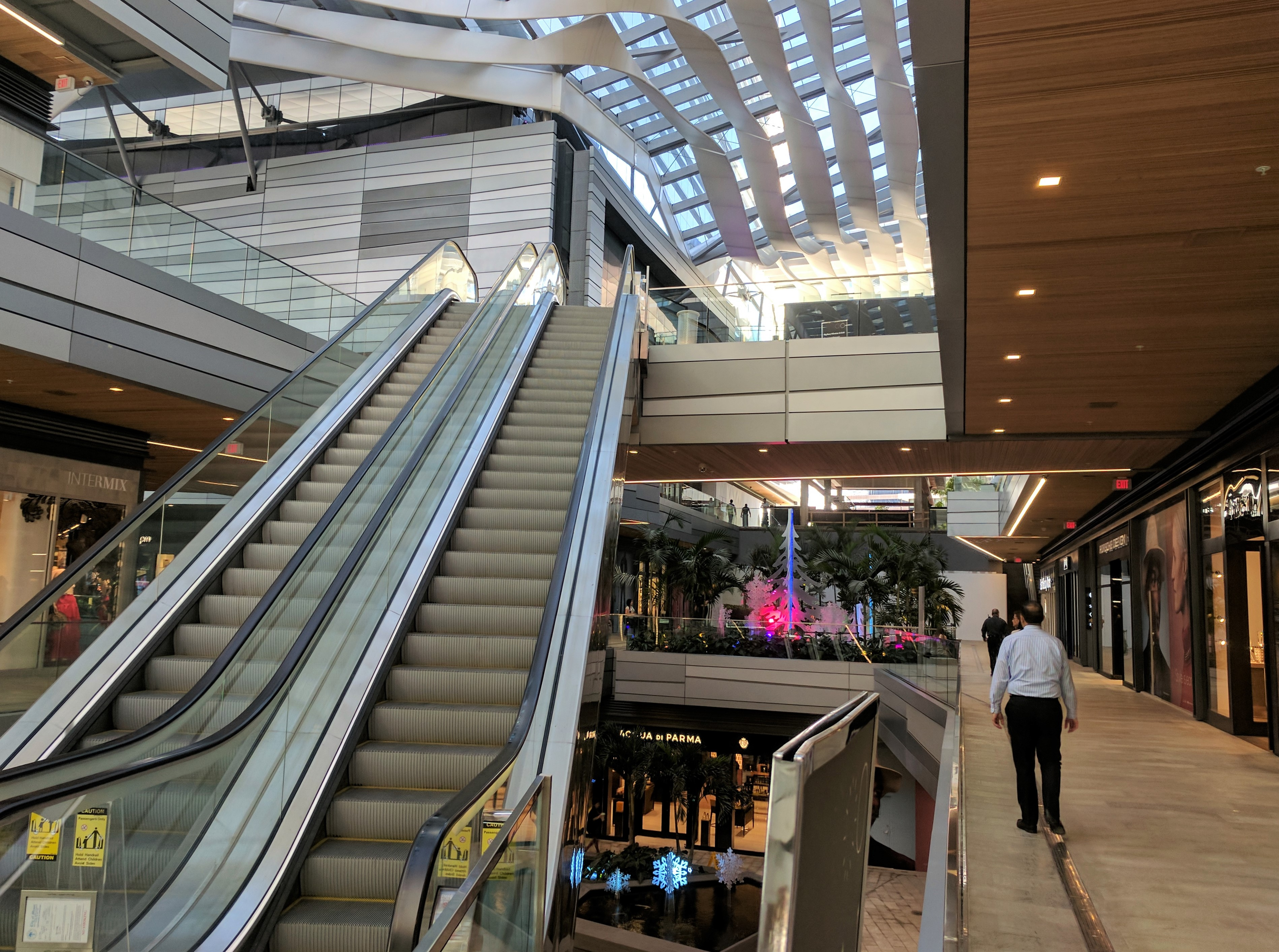
The semi-enclosed retail concourse of the Brickell City Centre.

The project was developed by Swire Properties Inc (the US subsidiary of Hong Kong–based Swire Properties), and spans slightly over 9 acres. The mixed-use development includes a Saks Fifth Avenue department store, luxury shops, restaurants, hotel, office towers and condominiums. The hotel flag was awarded to EAST, a Swire Hotels brand, which will be their first venture in North America. Currently there are EAST hotels in Hong Kong and Beijing, China. In February 2013, Swire Properties and the owners of Bal Harbour Shops announced that they had come to an agreement to co-develop the retail portion of the development. Later, in 2015, mall developer Simon Property Group also became a retail partner.

Limited portions of the project opened at the end of 2015, while the residential towers began occupancy in mid-2016. The retail section opened at the beginning of November 2016 with a formal ribbon cutting and concert by Miami-based rapper Pitbull. The Eighth Street Metromover station reopened in late 2015, though the third floor connection to the retail component remained locked until December 2016.

The project has been a catalyst for development in the trendy Brickell neighborhood. In the direct vicinity of the project, many luxury hi-rise buildings are under construction as of 2017. Arquitectonica, the architecture firm that designed the project was also chosen to create the Brickell Heights towers which are located between Brickell City Centre and the shops at Mary Brickell Village.

In 2017, the company reported 70 percent of condo sales were to Latin American buyers. By 2018, “80 percent of sales are going to local and domestic buyers.”

== History ==
The development was originally proposed as a complex of four skyscrapers and was approved by both the City of Miami and the Federal Aviation Administration, but the entire complex was cancelled in 2008 due to poor market conditions.

In May 2011, the project was revived by Swire Properties, and was planned to consist of four stories of retail and entertainment space, topped by six smaller towers; two residential, two office, a wellness tower and a hotel. Arquitectonica was announced as the architect and ArquitectonicaGEO as the landscape architect.

Two additional lots were purchased by Swire in 2011, the Brickell Tennis Club and the Eastern National Bank building making the entire development site over 9 acres (36,422 m^{2}). This permitted the project to receive Special Area Plan (SAP) zoning which according to Miami law allows developers to work more closely with the city on "integration of public improvements and infrastructure" Under the Special Area Plan, Swire was able to renovate and integrate the Eighth Street Metromover Station into the development.

The project also contains two levels of underground parking, covered sidewalks, and interconnectivity between all the buildings. Underground parking in South Florida is a rarity due to the low elevation above sea level. The 2,600 sub-grade car park for Brickell City Centre covers 7 acres (2.8 hectares), and required installation of watertight slurry walls from the site elevation of 7 feet (2.1 m) NGVD to around -20 feet (6.1 m). The City Commission gave the project its final approval in July 2011.

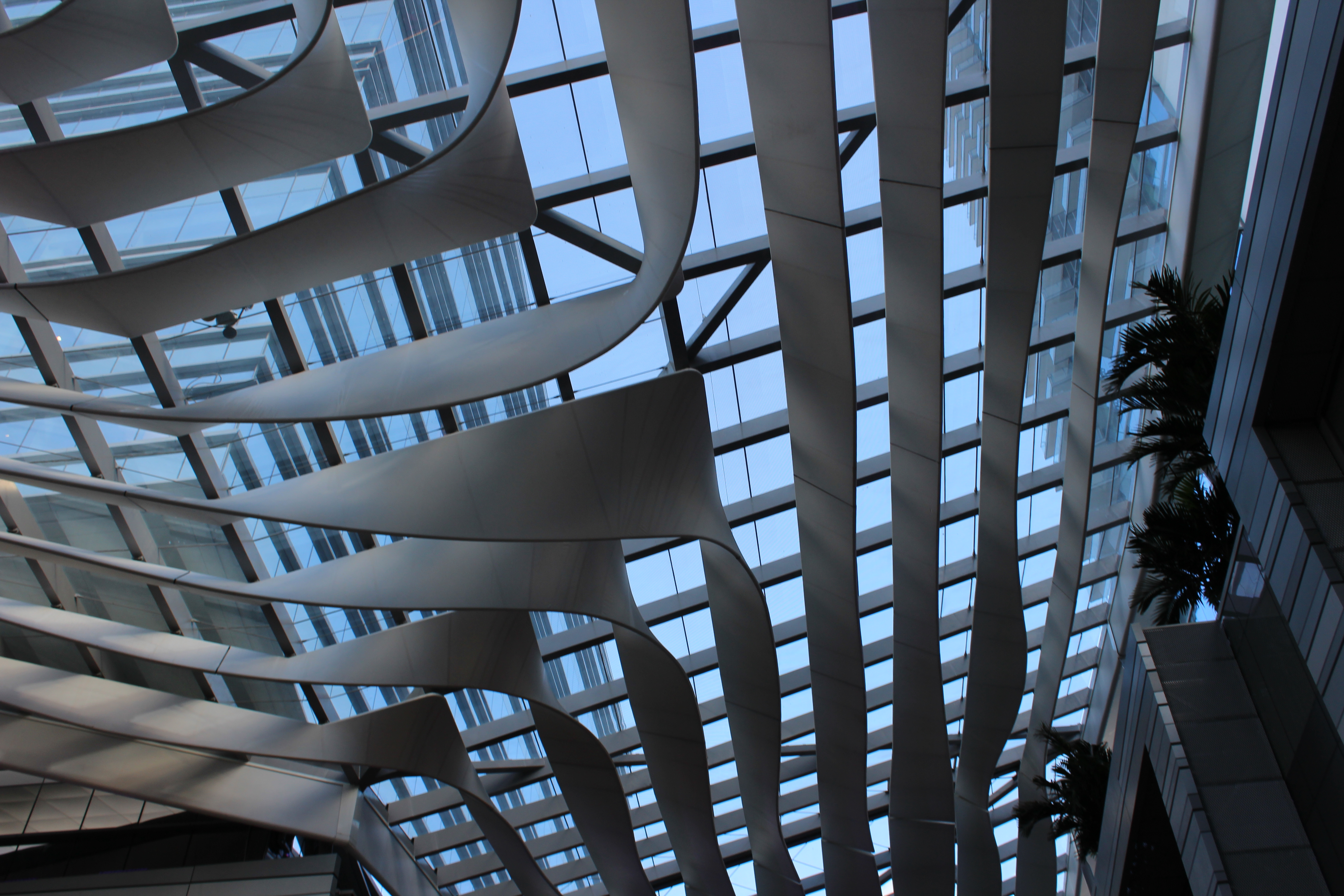
"Climate ribbon" designed to create airflow

On July 15, 2013, it was announced that Swire Properties had purchased an adjacent site at 700 Brickell Avenue in Miami, formerly the regional headquarters of Northern Trust Bank. The lot totals 1.55 acres and was purchased for just over $64 million. In September 2013, Swire announced the plans for the site, which include the previously purchased Eastern National Bank building. The proposal is for a future phase of the project which includes an 80-story tower, called One Brickell Centre, which will include retail, Class-A offices, condominiums and hotel space. The building was originally proposed at 1,102 feet (336 m), but was later reduced to 1,039 feet (317 m), at which height it was approved by the FAA. Redesigned in 2022 to contain mostly office space, construction will begin in 2023.

In 2025, the supertall One Brickell City Centre tower was cancelled as Swire listed the property for sale, amid a weak local office market for Class A space.

The project is LEED for Neighborhood Development certified. Among other things, sidewalks are set back from city streets and shielded from traffic by lush plantings. Numerous green features are also incorporated into buildings such as the climate ribbon.

== Towers ==
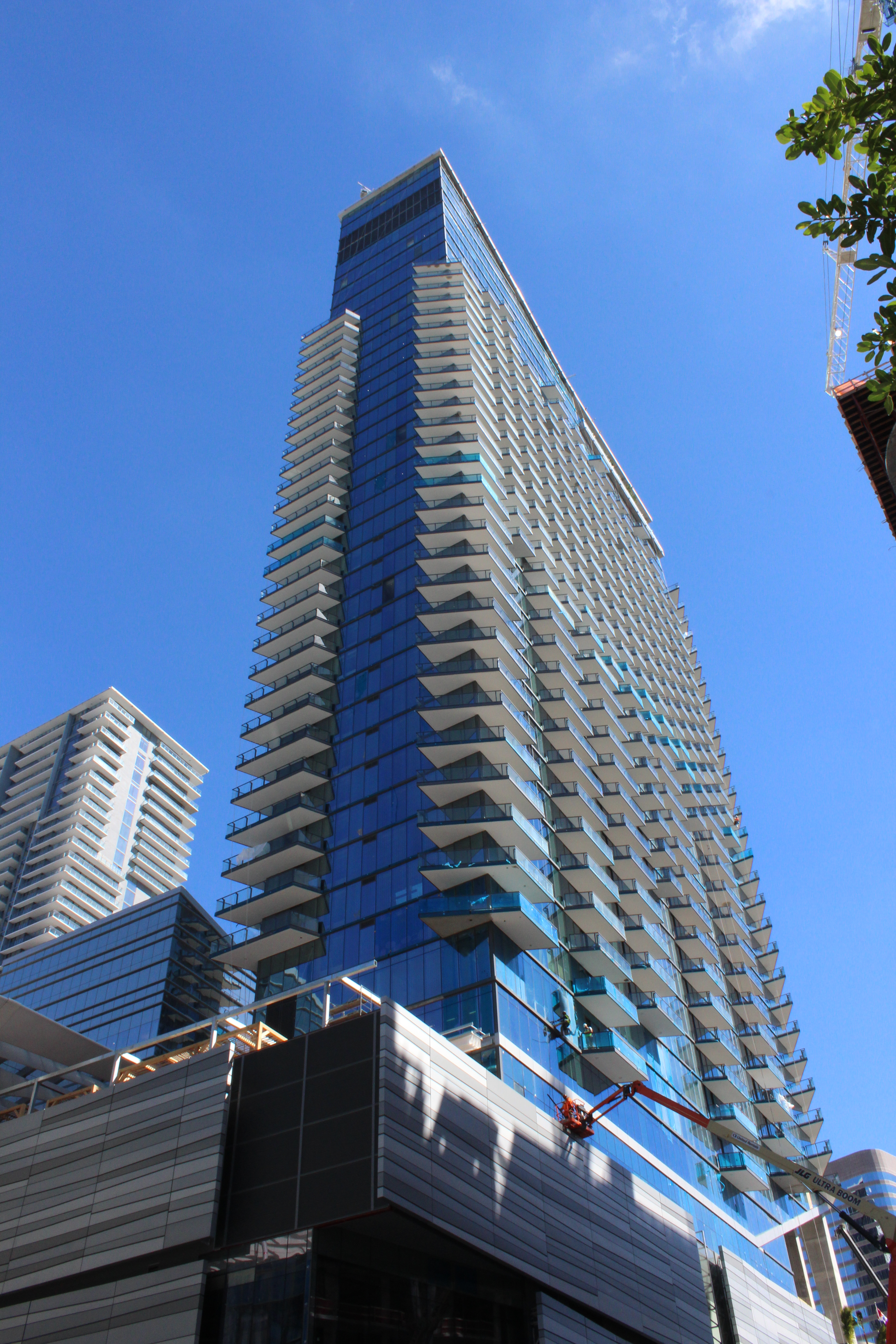
EAST Tower

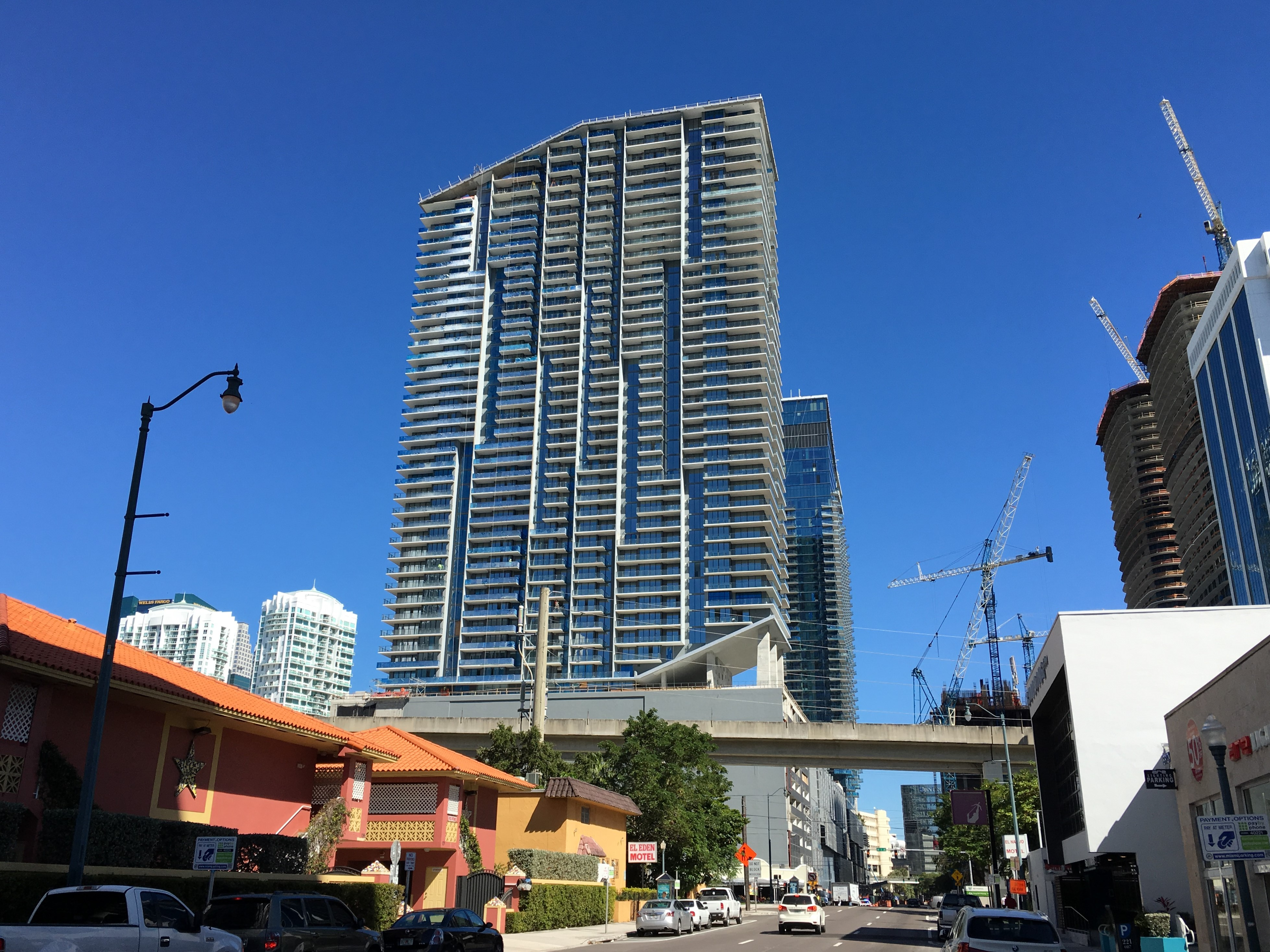
Rise Tower

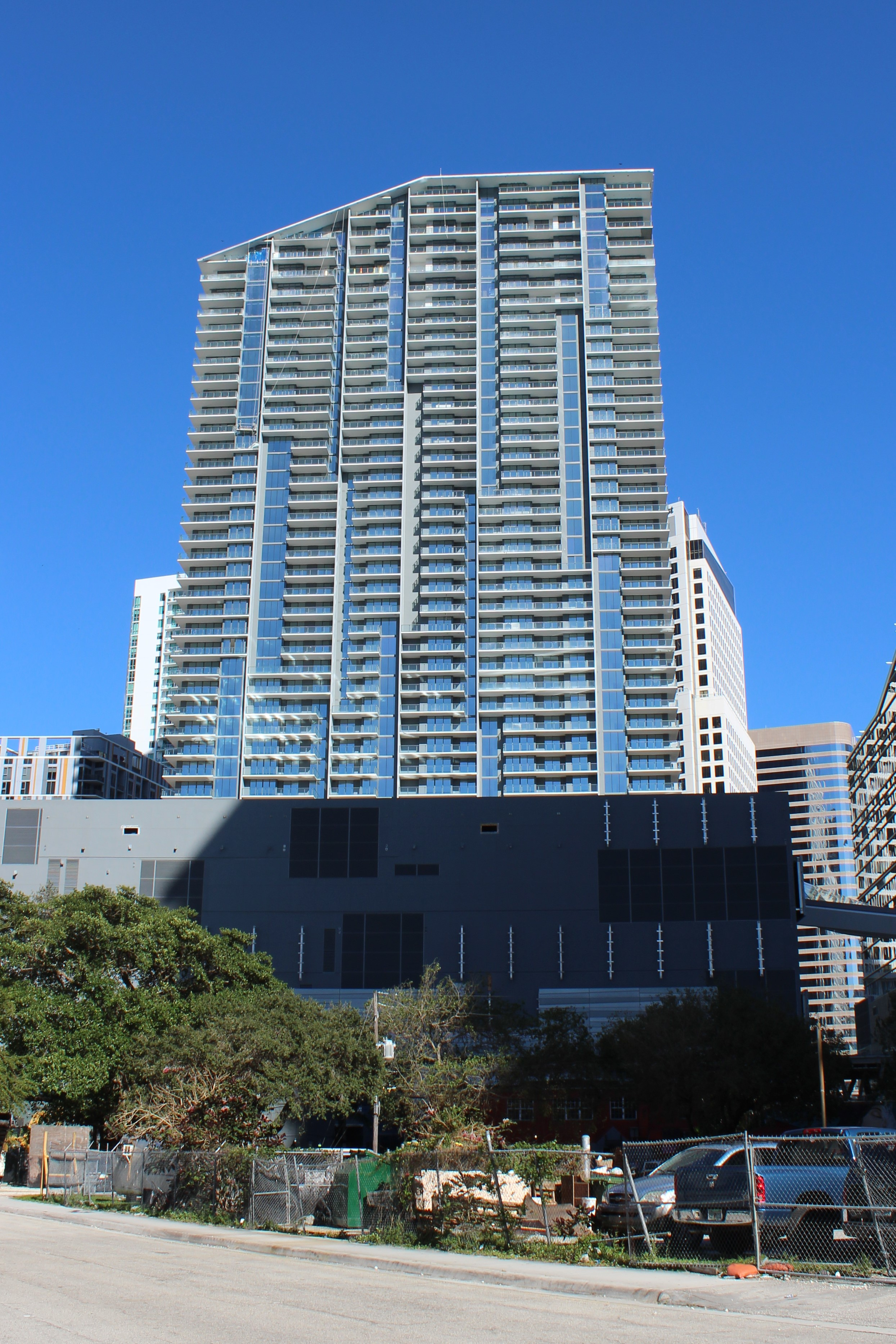
Reach Tower

Towering over the five-story mall complex that covers the majority of three city blocks are three high rises, known as EAST, Reach, and Rise. Each is just over 500 feet (150 m) with about 45 floors. The residential towers were "topped-out" in 2015 and began occupancy in 2016.

There is also a proposed tower known as One Brickell City Centre, which was scaled back and cancelled in the early 2020s. Its 1,000 ft height had been approved by the FAA and it would be the tallest building in Miami. While no official start date was given for One Brickell City Centre, Swire reported that it would be after the completion of phase one. There is also a plan for a more modest second phase tower known as "North Squared" that would be at SE 6 Street. Similarly to the first three towers, it would be a little over 500 feet (150 m) with just under 50 floors, as well as over 700 additional parking spaces than the several as part of the current underground garage. One Brickell Centre would have been tallest building in Miami by a large margin in the 2010s, though several other supertall (1,000 ft+) buildings have since been proposed or begun construction in Miami, including the 1,049 feet (320 m) Waldorf Astoria Miami currently under construction in Downtown Miami to top out in late 2026.

== See also ==
- List of tallest buildings in Miami
- Miami Worldcenter
