= Fifth Street station (Miami) =

Miami Metromover station

Fifth Street
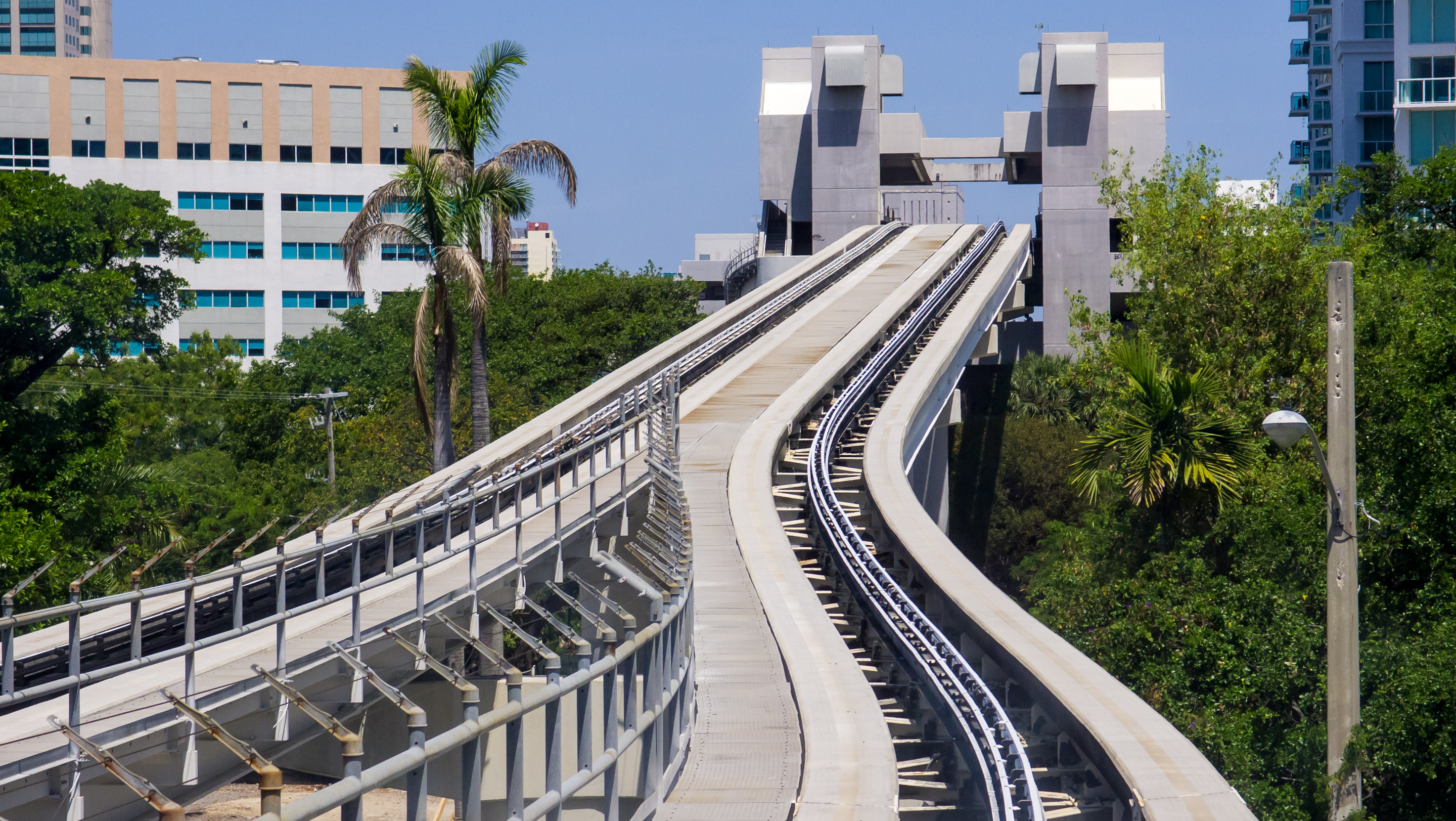
- View of the station from Eighth Street station

General information
- Location: 35 SE Fifth Street; Miami, Florida
- Coordinates: 25°46′9″N 80°11′32″W
- Owner: Miami-Dade County
- Platforms: 2 side platforms
- Tracks: 2

Construction
- Accessible: Yes

History
- Opened: May 26, 1994

Services
Preceding station	Miami-Dade Transit	Following station
Brickell City Centre toward Financial District	Brickell Loop	Riverwalk toward Downtown
Location

Fifth Street station is a Metromover station in the urban neighborhood of Brickell in Miami, Florida. It is located on the north side of Southeast 5th Street at Southeast 1st Avenue. The station opened on May 26, 1994, as part of the Omni extension.
