= John Slosar =

American businessman

- Born: Cleveland, Ohio
- Education: Columbia University (BA); University of Cambridge
- Occupation: Businessman
- Employer(s): Swire Pacific; Swire Properties; Cathay Pacific; HAECO

John Robert Slosar (Chinese: 史樂山) is an American-born Hong Kong businessman. He was the chairman and CEO of Cathay Pacific and chairman of Swire Pacific.

== Early life and education ==
Slosar was born in Cleveland, Ohio. He graduated from Columbia University, where he played soccer and American football. He then attended the University of Cambridge.

== Career ==
Slosar joined Swire in 1980 as a management trainee. In 1996, he became managing director of the Hong Kong Aircraft Engineering Company. In 1998, he became managing director of Swire beverages.

In 2011, Slosar became the chief executive of Cathay Pacific. In 2014, he was promoted to Chairman of Swire Pacific, Swire Properties, Cathay Pacific, HAECO, and Swire beverages, becoming the 35th and the first non-British chairman of the company.

In 2015, Slosar was bestowed the Legion of Honour by the French government. He was a director of Air China, PureCircle, and a member of the Council of Lingnan University and the International Advisory Board of Hong Kong Polytechnic University.

Slosar stepped down from his chairmanship of Swire in 2018. He stayed on as the chairman of Cathay Pacific until 2019. During the 2019–20 Hong Kong protests, he resisted pressure to suspend employees who participated in the protests and supported the staff's right to protest by saying that “We certainly wouldn’t dream of telling them what they have to think about something.” Slosar resigned in September 2019, before his board term was due to expire in May 2020.

== Personal life ==
Slosar is married to Joy Slosar, who is from Thailand. His daughter, Dana Slosar, won the sixth season of Asia's Next Top Model. It is reported that Slosar renounced his United States citizenship in 2010 and became a Chinese national.
