= Benoy =

UK architecture firm

Benoy is an international architecture firm with UK offices in London and Newark, plus bases in Shanghai, Dubai and Mumbai. It specialises in architecture, masterplanning and strategy, interior architecture, landscape architecture, branded environments, and commercial strategy. The company is mainly known for its retail work. Notable projects include Westfield schemes across several countries, Ferrari World in Abu Dhabi, ION Orchard and Jewel Changi Airport in Singapore, and Iconsiam in Bangkok, Thailand.

== History ==
Benoy was founded in 1947 in Nottinghamshire, designing cow sheds. It is now in its second generation as a family-run business, with CEO Tom Cartledge.

== Office locations ==
- London, UK
- Newark, UK
- Shanghai, China
- Dubai, UAE
- Mumbai, India

== Selected projects ==
- Hysan Place, Hong Kong
- Parc Central, Guangzhou, China
- Wuhan Alibaba Centre, Wuhan, China
- Ritz-Carlton, Tashkent, Uzbekistan
- London College of Fashion, UK (Wayfinding)
- Han Jardin, Hanoi, Vietnam
- Ferrari World, Abu Dhabi, UAE
- Heathrow Airport Projects, UK (Commercial Strategy)
- National Portrait Gallery, UK
- The Mural, Dubai, UAE
- INDIGO Beijing, China
- Elements, Hong Kong
- iAPM, Shanghai, China
- TSUM, Kyiv, Ukraine
- ION Orchard, Singapore
- SM Megamall, Philippines
- Terminal 4, Jewel Changi Airport, Singapore
- Iconsiam, Bangkok, Thailand

== Awards ==
- World Architecture Festival Awards 2026
  - 18 Cross, Singapore, shortlisted in the 'WAF Completed Buildings: Creative Re-use' category
  - Resorts World Sentosa 2.0, Singapore, shortlisted in the 'WAF Future Project: Leisure Led Development' category
- 2026 International Property Awards
- MIPIM Asia Awards 2025:
  - Taichung D‑ONE, Taiwan – Silver Award for Best New Mega Development
  - 18 Cross, Singapore – Bronze Award for Best Urban Regeneration Project
  - Wuhan Alibaba Centre, China – Bronze Award for Best Mixed-Use Project
- 2025 REARD Awards
- RIBA China Awards 2023
