= Novotel Citygate =

Hotel in Tung Chung, Hong Kong

Novotel Citygate Hong Kong
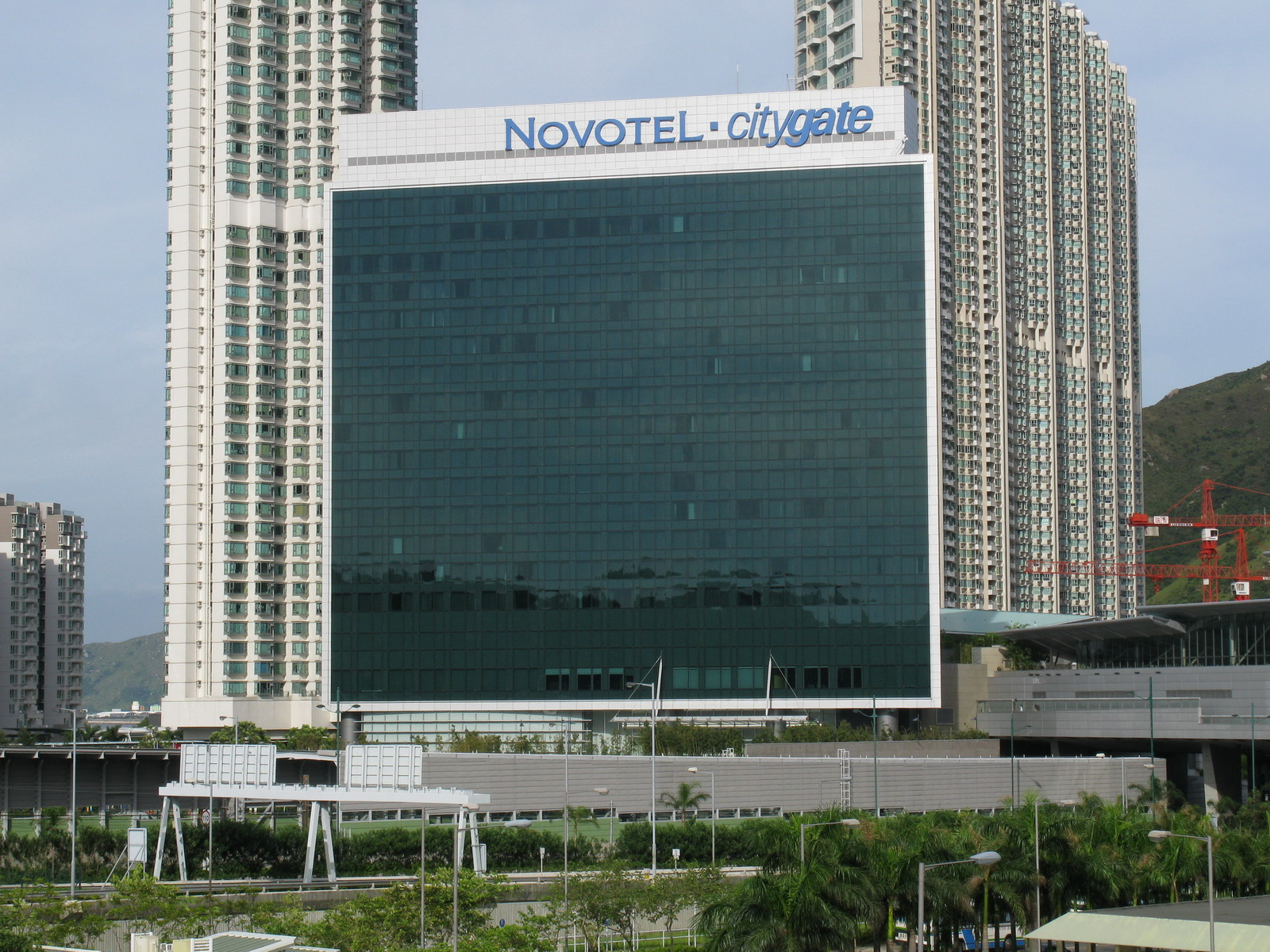
- Interactive map of the Novotel Citygate Hong Kong area
- Hotel chain: Novotel

General information
- Status: Completed
- Type: Hotel
- Location: No. 51 Man Tung Road; Tung Chung; Hong Kong
- Coordinates: 22.2912°N 113.9423°E
- Opened: April 2006; 19 years ago
- Owner: Newfoundworld Site 2 (Hotel) Limited
- Affiliation: AccorHotels

Technical details
- Floor count: 23

Other information
- Number of rooms: 440
- Number of suites: 14
- Number of restaurants: 4
- Facilities: 3 restaurants (1 including bar), 7 function rooms, outdoor swimming pool, 24-hour gym

Website
- novotelcitygate.com

Novotel Citygate
- Traditional Chinese: 諾富特東薈城酒店
- Simplified Chinese: 诺富特东荟城酒店
Transcriptions
Standard Mandarin
- Hanyu Pinyin: Nuòfùtè Dōnghuìchéng Jiǔdiàn
Yue: Cantonese
- Jyutping: nok6 fu3 dak6 dung1 wai3 sing4 zau2 dim3

Novotel Citygate Hong Kong (Chinese: 諾富特東薈城酒店) is a 4-star hotel in Hong Kong. It opened in April 2006, and is managed by AccorHotels. Novotel Citygate has 440 rooms including 14 suites from 26 to 45 square metres, 3 restaurants and a bar, a gym, an outdoor swimming pool and meeting facilities.

The hotel is located near various attractions on Lantau Island, including the Citygate Outlets shopping centre, the AsiaWorld–Expo exhibition centre, the Ngong Ping Cable Car, Hong Kong Disneyland, SkyPlaza, SkyCity Nine Eagles Golf Course, and Tai O fishing village.

== Design ==
The original interior design was started by Simon Jackson, who arranged guest rooms in a herringbone design. Later on, Hong Kong architect and designer, Steve Leung completed the task. In addition, the restaurants and bar were designed by interior designer, Yasumichi Morita. The Feng Shui elements located at garden and sun terrace were designed by landscape architect Sandy Duggie.

The number three represents “liveliness” in Feng Shui. The hotel entrance features three geometric beds of bamboo in low ground cover, and a still water pool. The revolving door contains 3 leaves and moves in a clockwise direction, which represents good luck in and bad luck out. The revolving door is 4.8m high and is the tallest revolving door in the world and has held the Guinness Record since 2006.

At the poolside garden terrace, there is a white marble sculpture named ‘Trans for Matter’ by Italian sculptor Polo Bourieau. Water runs from the sculpture and through a narrow channel across the center of a spacious timber sundeck and down to a large granite waterfall.

== Facilities ==
Novotel Citygate has 440 rooms and suites with airport, sea and mountain views, including 2 rooms that provide access for people with disabilities. Broadband connection is available inside the hotel. Facilities include 3 restaurants and a bar, 7 function rooms, an outdoor swimming pool and 24-hour gymnasium.

== Transportation ==
- Mass Transit Railway (MTR)

The hotel is direct access to Tung Chung MTR station via Citygate Outlets, it takes 28 minutes to Central MTR station.

- Complimentary Airport Shuttle

Complimentary shuttle service to/from Hong Kong International Airport from 6am – 11:45pm hours at 15-minute intervals. Shuttle bus station located at coach bay 29-30 in Terminal 2. Please approach B16 counter upon arrival at the Arrival Hall.

- Hotel Shuttle to AsiaWorld–Expo

Shuttle bus to AsiaWorld–Expo runs on selected trade show periods.

- Airport Coach Service to Shenzhen and Guangdong Province

Coaches are available from the airport to Shenzhen, Guangzhou, Dongguan, Shenzhen Airport, Huizhou, Foshan, Zhongshan.

- Coach Service to Shenzhen in Citygate Outlets

Coaches are available from Citygate Outlets to Huanggang, Shenzhen.
