= Sanlitun =

Area of the Chaoyang District, Beijing

Sanlitun 三里屯
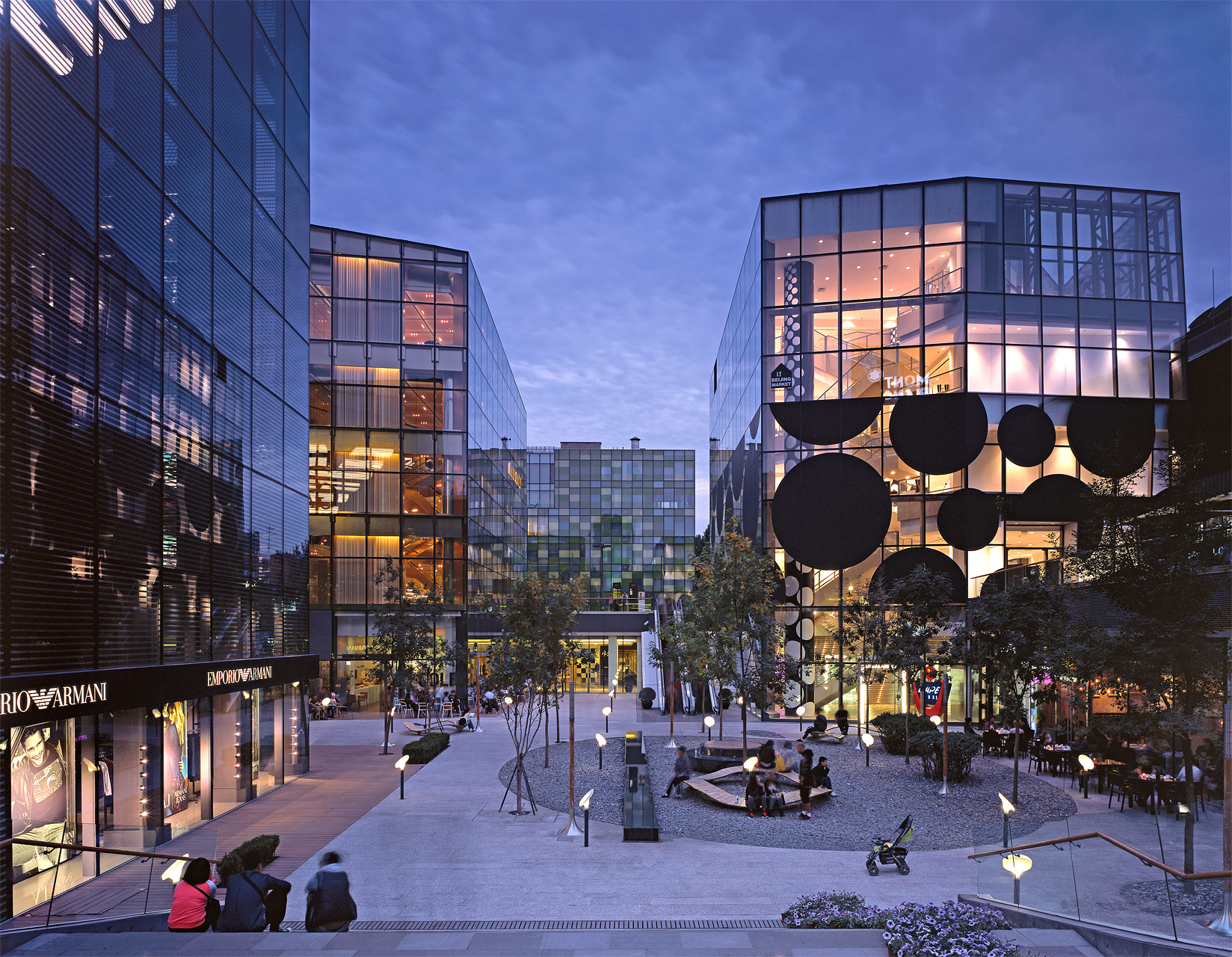
- Taikoo Li Sanlitun (North area)
- Interactive map of Sanlitun
- Coordinates: 39°56′10″N 116°26′56″E
- Country: China
- City: Beijing
- District: Chaoyang District
- Subdistrict: Sanlitun Subdistrict

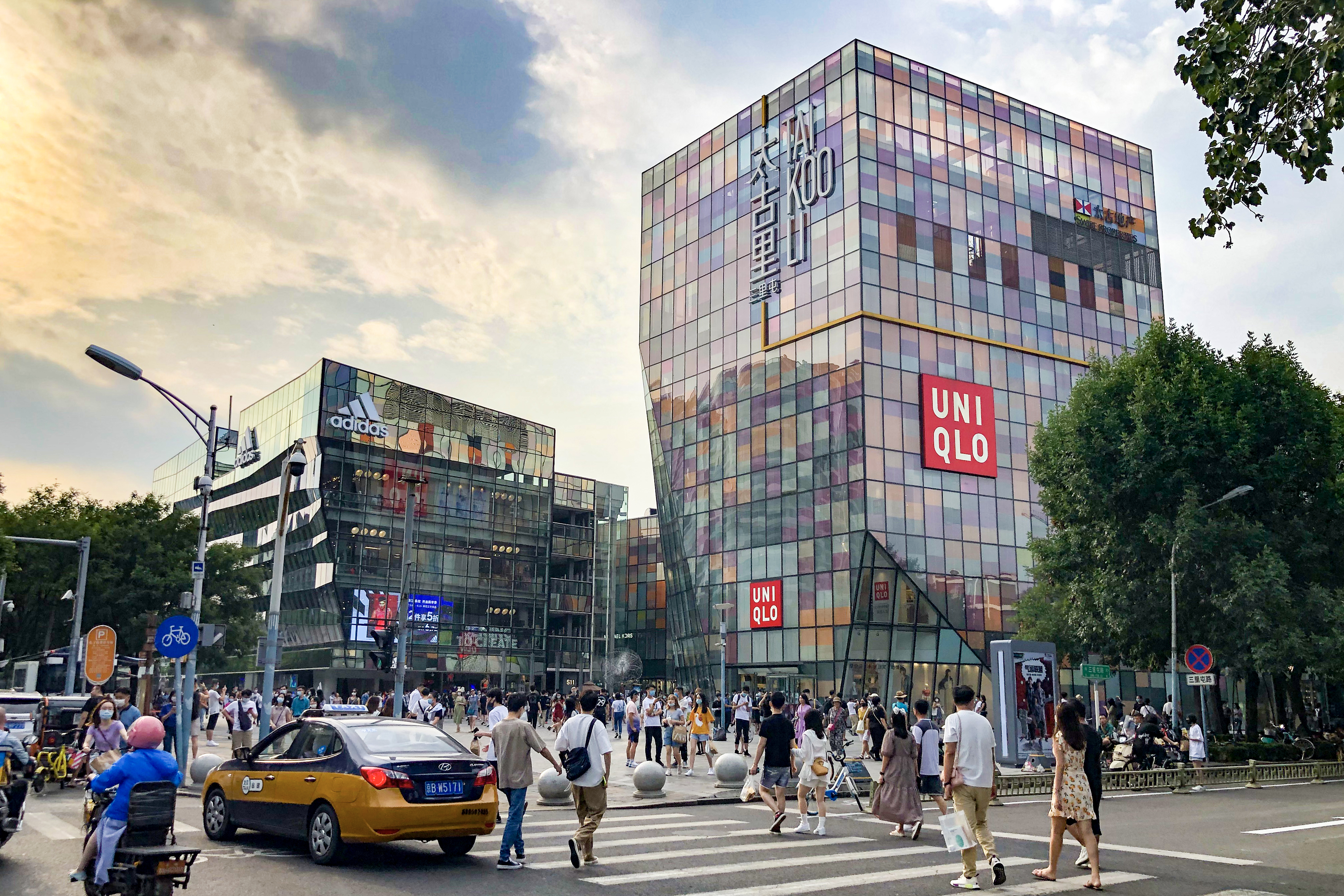
Taikoo Li Sanlitun shopping arcade

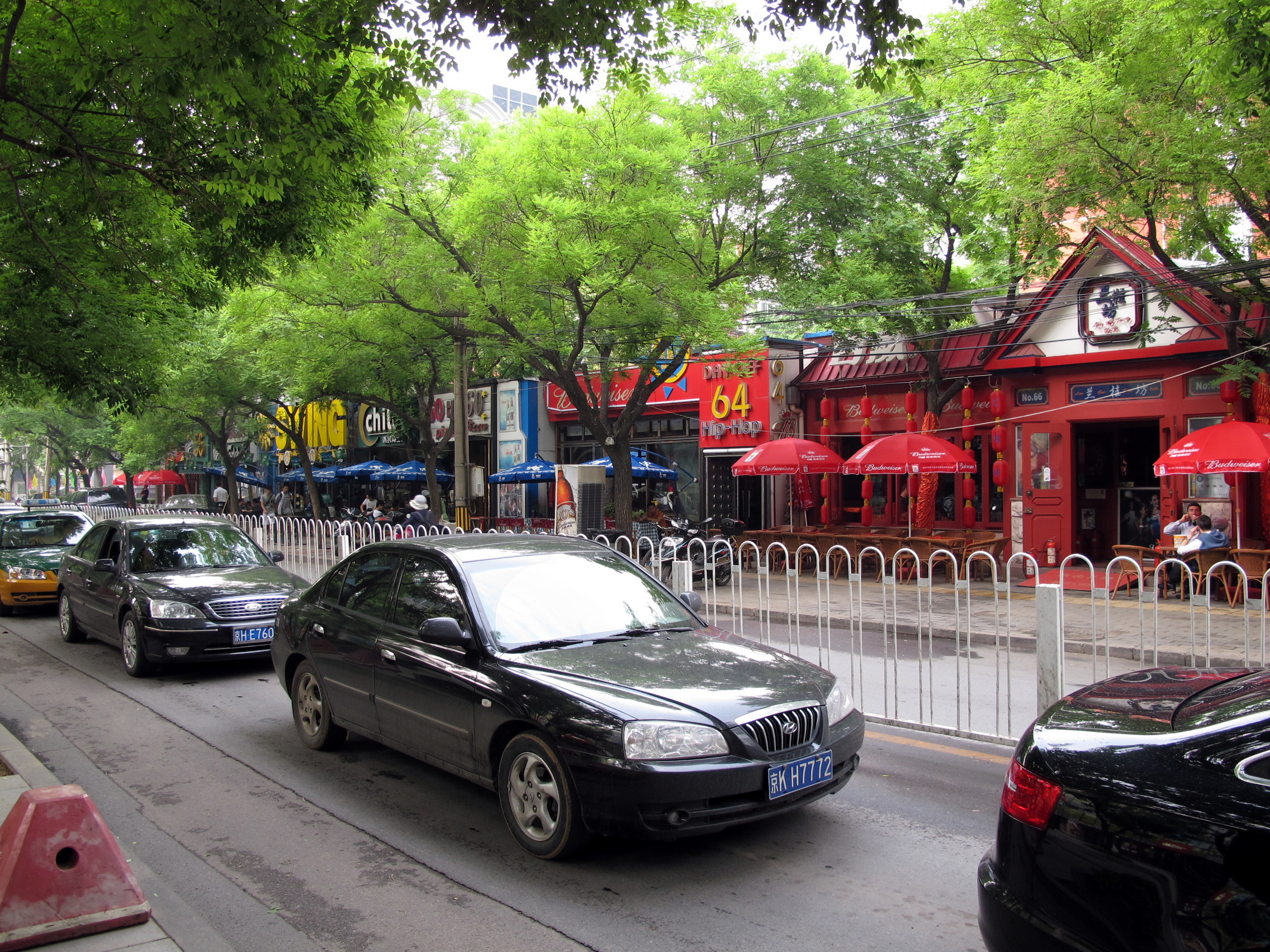
Sanlitun Restaurants in 2010

Sanlitun (Chinese: 三里屯; pinyin: Sānlǐtún; lit. 'three li village') or Sanlitun Bar Street (Chinese: 三里屯酒吧街) is an area in Sanlitun Subdistrict, Chaoyang District, Beijing containing many bars, restaurants, and stores. It is a popular destination for shopping, dining, and entertainment. The area has been under almost constant regeneration since the late 20th century as part of a citywide project of economic regrowth. It currently houses many bars and clubs popular with both locals and foreigners as well as international brand-name stores such as Uniqlo, Apple, Nike, Adidas, KFC and Nathan's Famous. It is notable for housing the largest Adidas store in the world.

== History ==
Prior to 1949, the Beijing Legation Quarter was the center of diplomatic activity in the capital. After the foundation of the People's Republic of China, the government wanted to move the diplomatic district outside the inner city. Sanlitun was chosen as the area where foreign legations and embassies were to be reallocated in the late 1950s. The area was called Sanlitun to designate its location from Dongzhimen gate (东直门), with tun meaning 'locality' and san li meanings 'three li' (a li is 0.5 km), so that the name means "locality 1.5 km away (from Dongzhimen Gate)".

Sanlitun began to grow when, along with the reform and opening up, bars serving expatriates and later locals began to open. International hotels introduced the first bars, but in the 1990s, standalone establishments appeared. Accounts differ over which was the first bar in Sanlitun, with one author crediting the Cat Cafe in 1995 while another names Frank's Place, which opened in 1990.

The first supermarket in Beijing opened in Sanlitun in November 1982. This supermarket has an area about 300 square meters, selling a variety of products.

The first bar on North Sanlitun Rd opened in 1995. After nearly 30 years, Sanlitun houses about 70% of bars in Beijing.

South Sanlitun Rd used to have stores selling auto parts. After the construction of the Bar Street, those stores are demolished.

Sanlitun Village opened in 2008, giving the area many new shops, restaurants, bars and a multiplex cinema. In 2013, Sanlitun Village changed its name to Taikoo Li Sanlitun.

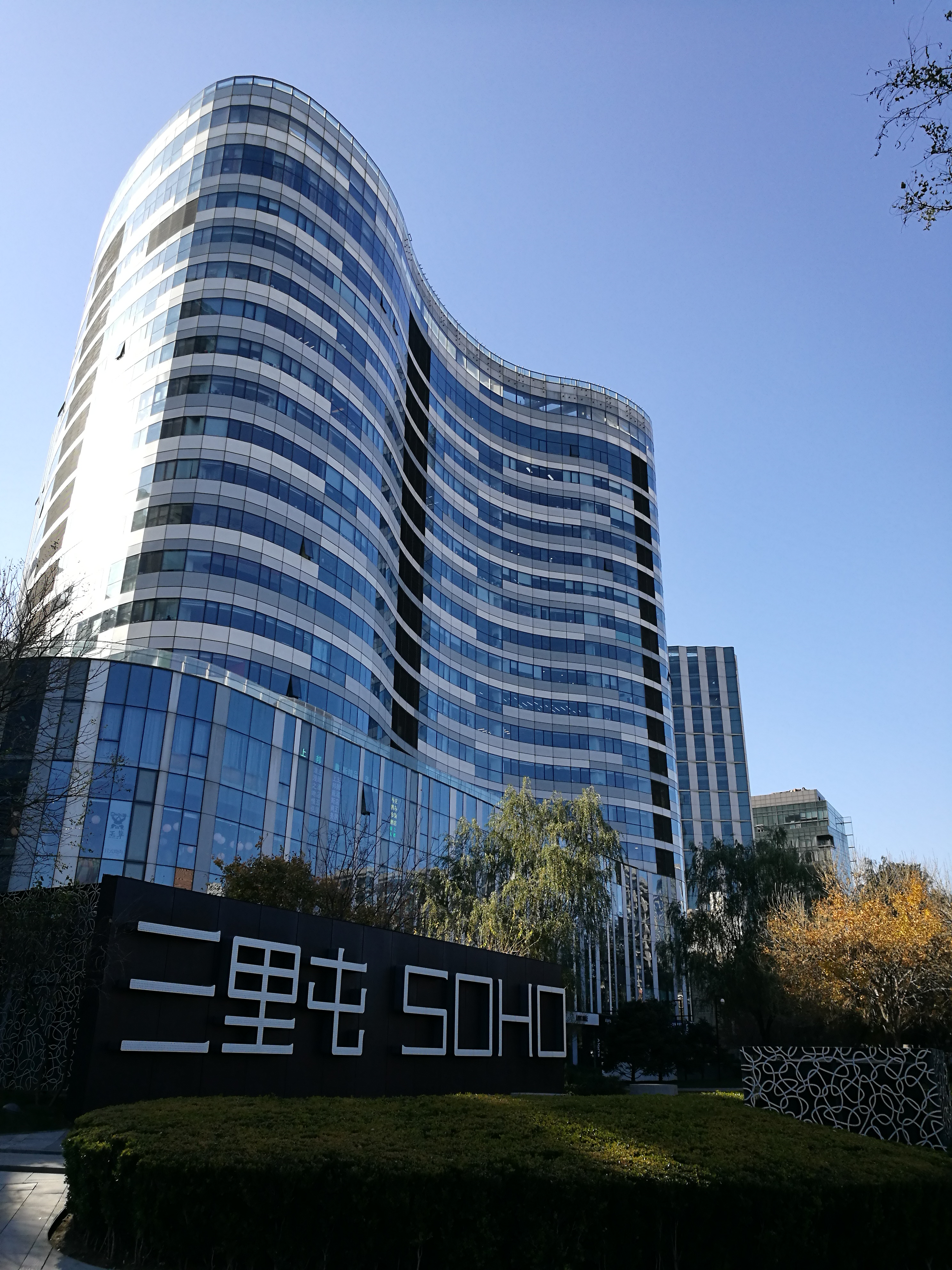
Sanlitun SOHO designed by Kengo Kuma

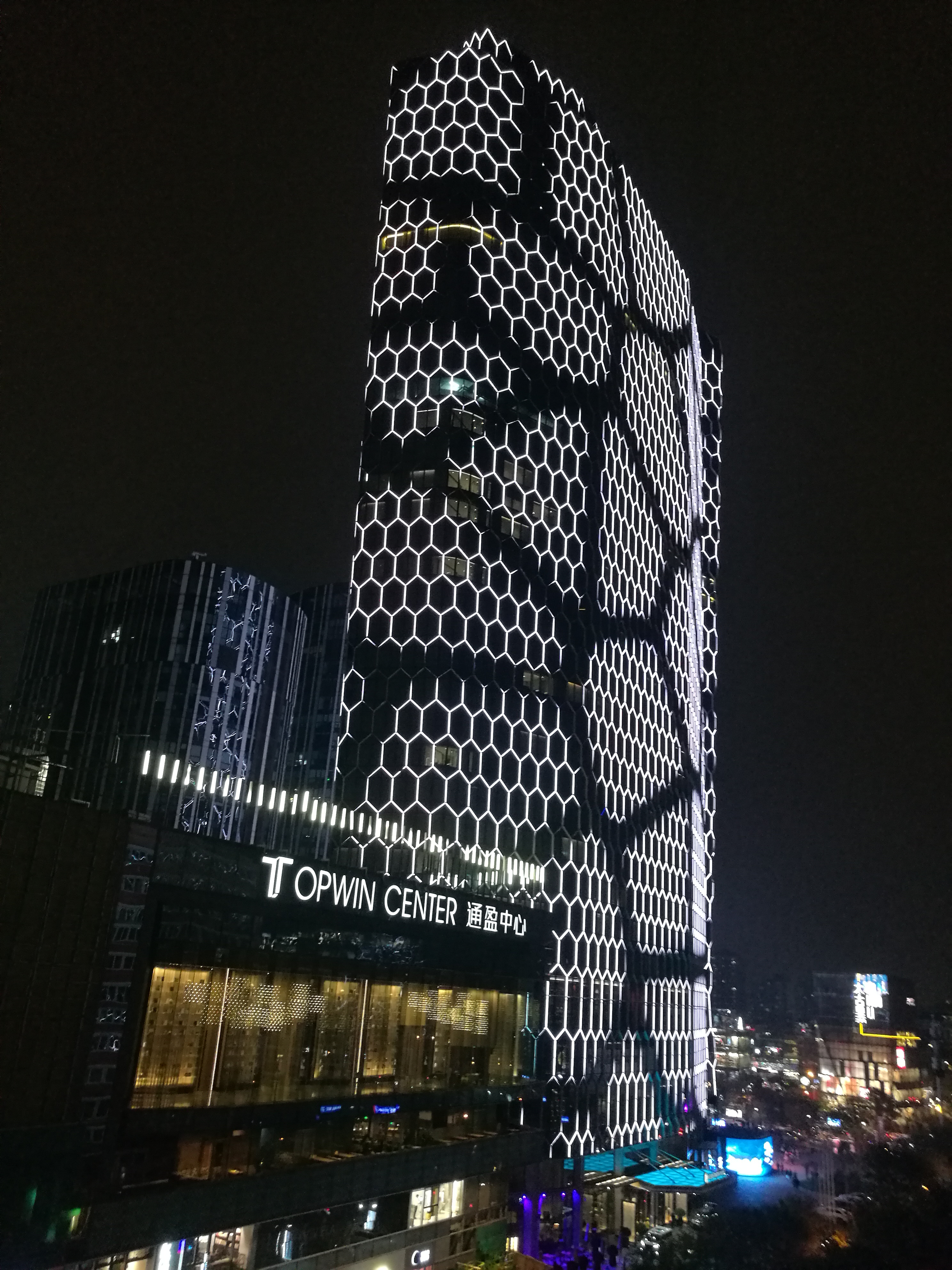
Topwin Center

Sanlitun saw significant new construction as part of preparations for the 2008 Summer Olympics. In April 2008, as part of an ongoing operation to clean up the city, a major drug bust occurred in Sanlitun and many arrests were made. A total of four bars and clubs were effectively closed, including a notorious bar known as Pure Girl for its cheap alcohol and availability of drugs, both its bartender and manager were executed for distribution of drugs. However, it has since reopened a year later with new management. The police operation was widely criticized for its violence and absence of proper due process. A number of drug dealers as well as a barman are believed to have received the death penalty as a result of this operation.

The Uniqlo in Taikoo Li Sanlitun gained international attention after it was the site of a July 2015 sex tape that was filmed inside one of the store's fitting rooms. Uniqlo denied any involvement in the video.

In an August 2015 incident near the Uniqlo, a Chinese woman was killed and her French husband was wounded in an attack by a sword-wielding man.

On 25 December 2015, following the November 2015 Paris attacks by ISIS, several foreign embassies in Beijing warned of possible threats against Westerners in the Sanlitun shopping district on or around Christmas Day, urging their citizens to "exercise heightened vigilance."

A popular destination for foreigners and young people was the "dirty street" of hole-in-the-wall restaurants and bars at the center of Sanlitun. However, the street was cleaned up in 2017.

As a landmark of Beijing, Sanlitun becomes a popular place to be chosen as the setting in many films and TV series. The films and TV series include Mr. Six, Love Is Not Blind, and A Little Reunion.

== Popular spots ==
=== Main subareas ===
- Taikoo Li Sanlitun (Chinese: 三里屯太古里)
- Sanlitun SOHO (Chinese: 三里屯 SOHO)
- Topwin Center (Chinese: 通盈中心)
- Pacific Century Place (Chinese: 盈科中心)
- Hongjie Mansion (Chinese: 中国红街)
- Nali Patio (Chinese: 那里花园) is a multistory Mediterranean-style building built around the 2008 Olympics. It houses many bars and restaurants.
- Sanlitun Bar Street (Chinese: 三里屯酒吧街) houses over 80 bars and tea bars on the side of Sanlitun Rd.
- 3.3 Mansion (Chinese: 3.3大厦)
- Beijing Workers' Stadium (Chinese: 北京工人体育场) is a stadium constructed in 1959 for the 10th anniversary of the People's Republic of China. It is the home to Beijing Sinobo Guoan F.C. now.

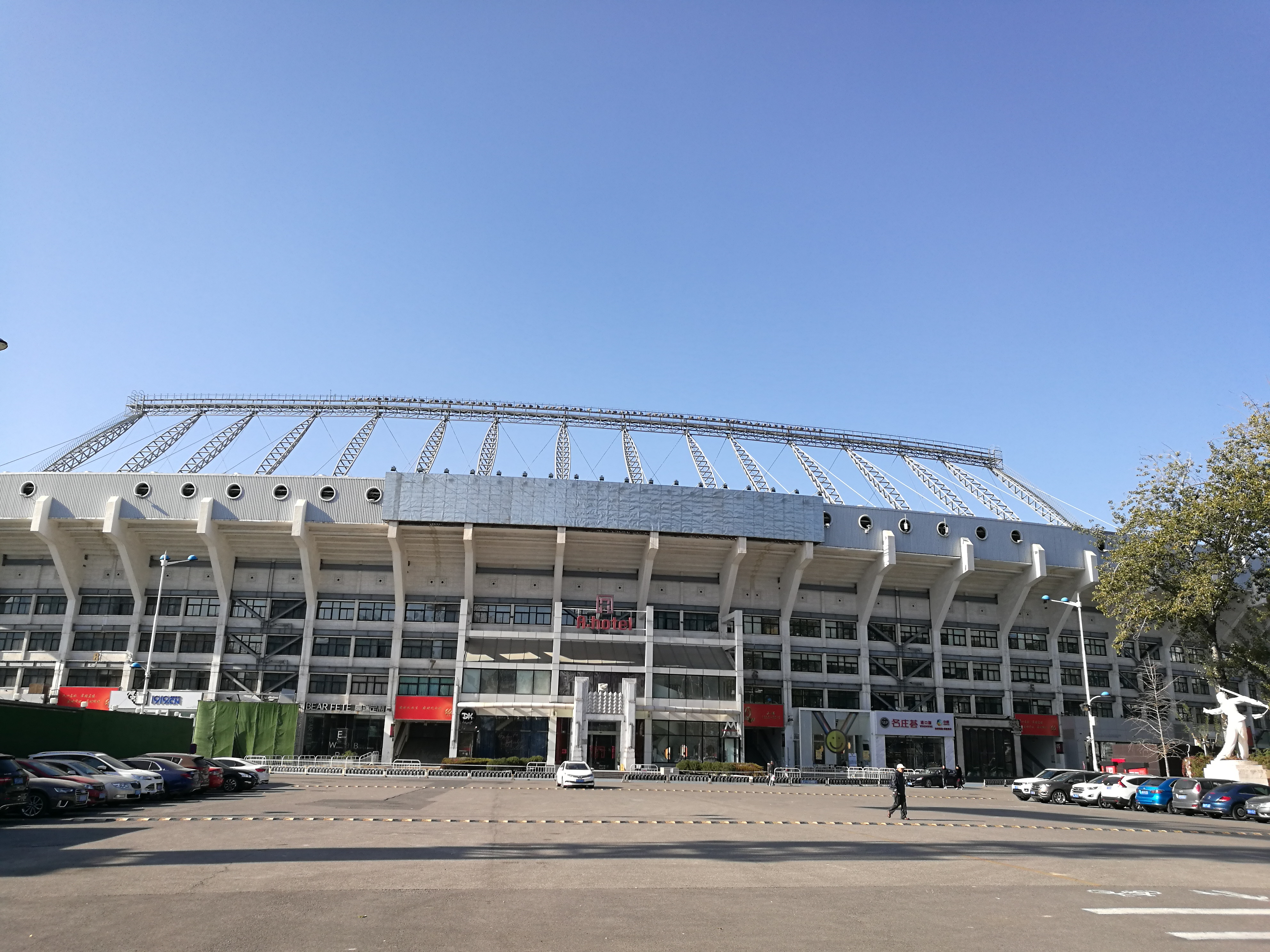
Beijing Workers' Stadium

=== Popular places ===
- Sanlian Taofen Bookstore is a 24-hour bookstore opened in 2018. It not only sells books and souvenirs but also provides drinks for people to stay and to work.
- Shiba Inu café is a café famous for having dogs that people can play and take picture with.

== Economy ==
The headquarters of Caixin is in the Sanlitun SOHO (三里屯SOHO).

== Education ==
=== International schools ===
- British School of Beijing Sanlitun Campus
- Pakistan Embassy College Beijing
- Accredited Italian Kindergarten in Beijing (Italian: Scuola Italiana Paritaria d’Infanzia a Pechino), formerly the Accredited Italian Embassy School of Beijing (Italian: Scuola Italiana Paritaria d'Ambasciata di Pechino, Chinese: 意大利使馆学校) - It is located on the grounds of the Sanlitun Diplomatic Residence Compound (三里屯外交公寓).
  - It opened in 2015, making it the first Italian international school in East Asia. It operates in cooperation with Reggio Children. It previously had a primary school section. In 2020, due to a decline in enrollment, it became a kindergarten only. It is now known as the Scuola Italiana Paritaria d’Infanzia a Pechino in Italian, while its Chinese name remained the same. The English name is now .
- Ivy Academy – The Ivy Group

=== Chinese local schools ===
- Beijing Union University (Electromechanical College)
- Beijing No.80 High School
- Beijing Sanlitun No.1 Middle School
- Beijing Chaoyang Experimental Primary School
- Baijiazhuang Primary School

== Transportation ==
=== Subway ===
- Workers' Stadium station, served by subway lines 3 and 17
- Tuanjiehu station, served by subway lines 3 and 10

=== By bus ===
1. Take No.3, No.110, No.113, No.115, No.117, No.118, No.120 to Gongrentiyuchang Station
2. Take No.113, No.115, No.431, No.701, No.16, No.34 to Sanlitun Station
3. Take No.113, No.115, No.117, No.431, No.701, No.16 to Changhongqiaoxi Station

== See also ==
- Sanlitun Subdistrict
