= Taikoo Li Sanlitun =

Shopping centre in the Sanlitun area of Beijing

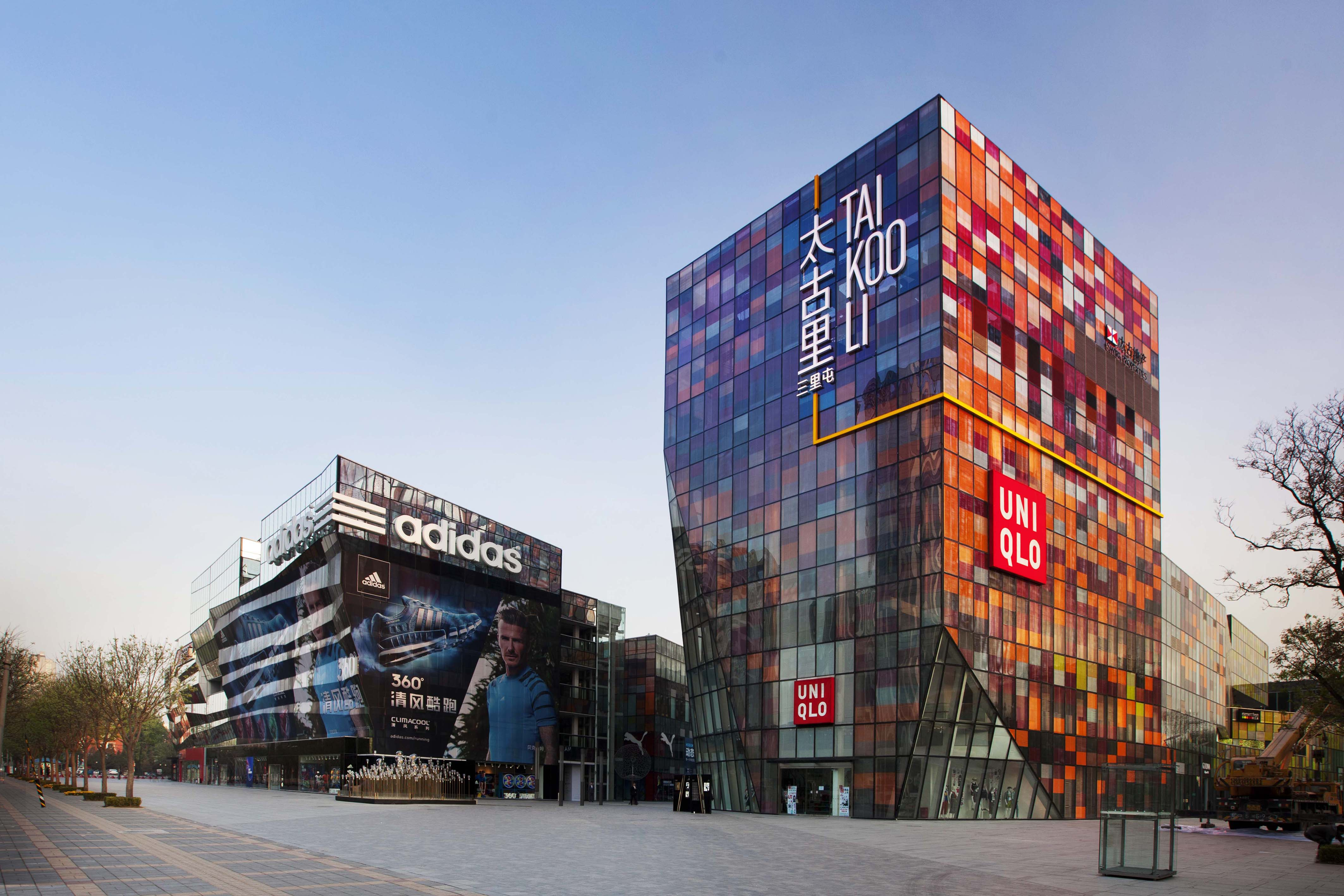
- Taikoo Li Sanlitun
- Location: Sanlitun, Beijing
- Coordinates: 39.933536°N 116.448053°E
- Address: 19 Sanlitun Road, Chaoyang District
- Opened: 2008
- Developer: Swire Properties
- Architect: Kengo Kuma
- Num. of stores: 300
- Floor area: 1,720,000 sq ft (160,000 m^{2})
- Website: taikoolisanlitun.com#/

Taikoo Li Sanlitun (Chinese: 三里屯太古里; pinyin: Sānlǐtún Tàigǔlǐ), formerly Sanlitun Village, is a shopping center in the Sanlitun area of the Chaoyang District in Beijing, China. It comprises 19 buildings on two sites that are a few minutes walk from each other.

== Location ==
Taikoo Li Sanlitun is adjacent to Beijing Subway Line 2 Dongsi Shitiao Station and Line 10 Tuanjiehu Station. Dongdaqiao Station on Line 6 is also close by. It is a ten-minute walk from Tuanjiehu, a twenty-minute walk from Dongsi Shitiao and a twenty-minute walk from Dongdaqiao. It is recommended to take Exit A or D from Tuanjiehu.

== History and construction ==
The center opened in July 2008, and is developed and managed by Hong Kong–based Swire Properties. It comprise two sites:

The Piazza (Taikoo Li South)

The center opened in July 2008, and contains 260+ stores, dining outlets and services including a multi-screen

The Deck (Taikoo Li North)

The area includes a large number of stores, especially fashion brands. It also includes art galleries focusing on avant-garde and contemporary Chinese and foreign artists.

Taikoo Li West

Opened in 2021 with about 20 stores and over 27,500 sqm

=== Design ===
It was designed by a group led by the Oval partnership from Hong Kong, and Japanese architect Kengo Kuma (隈 研吾).

The design of Taikoo Li South is inspired by Beijing's hutongs, while Taikoo Li North draws its courtyard form from China's siheyuan. The space also includes modern pieces such as an open fountain and little touches from contemporary artists.
