= Taikoo Hui Guangzhou =

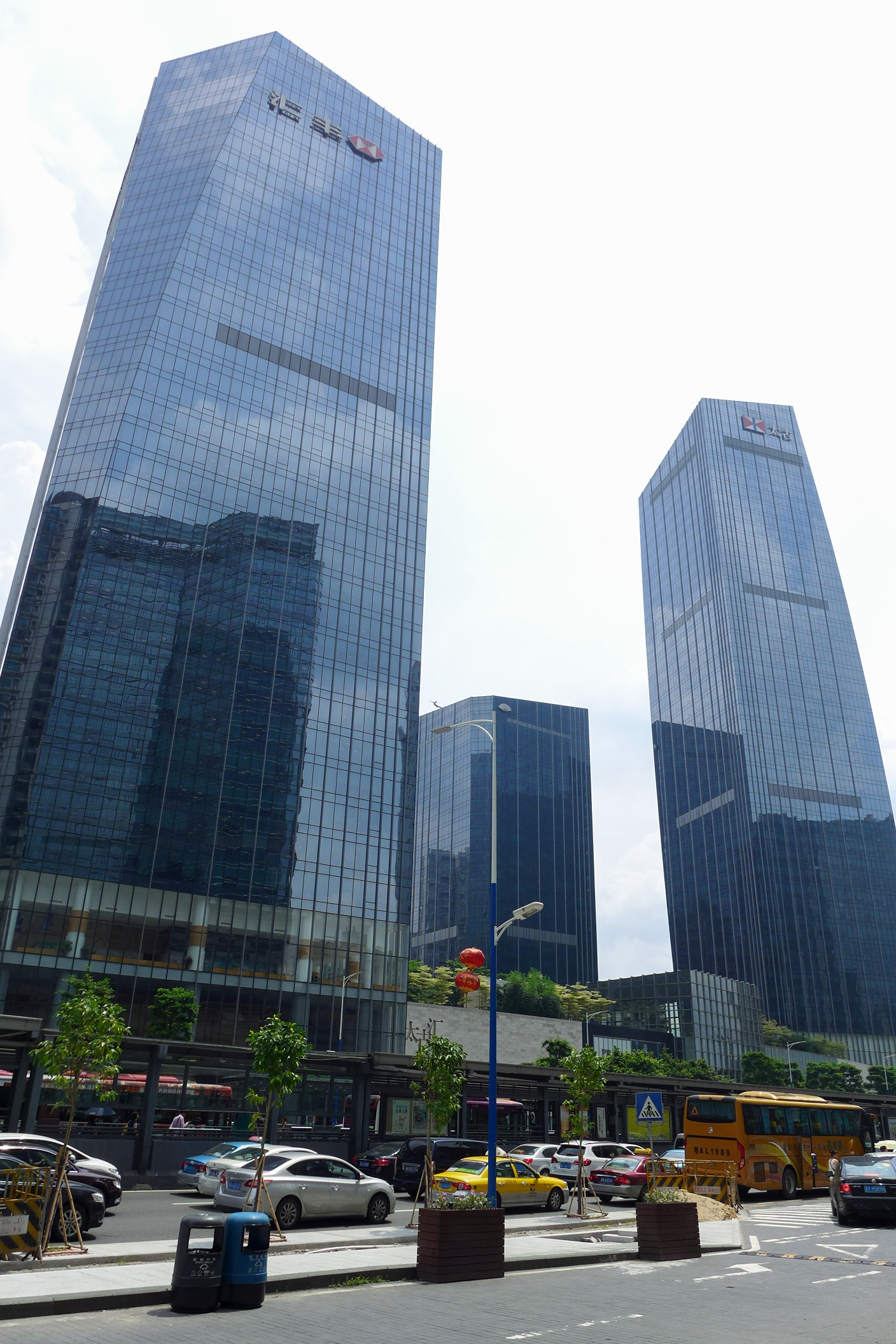
- View of Taikoo Hui, Guangzhou
- Location: 383 Tianhe Road, Tianhe District, Guangzhou, China
- Coordinates: 23°8′11″N 113°19′37″E
- Opened: 2011
- Developer: Swire Properties
- Num. of stores: Over 180 shops and restaurants
- Floor area: Approximately 1.50 million sq ft (138,000 sqm)
- Parking: 718 parking spaces
- Website: www.taikoohui.com

Taikoo Hui Guangzhou (simplified Chinese: 广州太古汇; traditional Chinese: 廣州太古匯; pinyin: Tàigǔ huì; Jyutping: Taai^{3}gu^{2} wui^{6}) is a multi-use complex in Tianhe District of Guangzhou, China. The project consists of a large indoor shopping mall, two Grade-A office towers, Guangzhou's first five-star Mandarin Oriental Hotel, serviced apartments and a cultural centre. The 358,000 square metre property was designed by American company Arquitectonica, and is managed by Hong Kong–based Swire Properties.

== Location and accessibility ==
The complex is located close to the junction of Tianhe Road and Tianhe East Road with visitors able to park at the shopping centre. The complex is also well-served by public transport, with visitors recommended to alight at Tianhe Sports Center and Shipaiqiao stations which are directly connected to lines 1 and 3 of the Guangzhou Metro.

== History ==
In 2001, Swire Properties (55%) and Guangzhou Daily (45%) signed a Memorandum of Understanding for developing a multi-use complex in Tianhe District of Guangzhou. In 2002, Swire Properties and Guangzhou Daily signed an agreement of 4 billion investment to develop and build a multi-use complex called "Taikoo Hui – Guangzhou Daily Group Cultural Plaza". In 2004, Swire Properties signed a revised joint venture agreement with the Guangzhou Daily Group to increase its stake in the Taikoo Hui commercial and cultural complex in Guangzhou to 97%.

On 23 September 2011, Taikoo Hui was officially opened.

In January 2013, the Mandarin Oriental Hotel & Serviced Residences commenced operations.

In August 2024, Guangzhou Taikoo Hui successfully secured via public auction the Guangzhou Cultural Center (Unit 101, 387 Tianhe Road) directly connected to its shopping mall complex. Spanning a total gross floor area of approximately 655,000 square feet, this asset will undergo comprehensive redevelopment into a high-end retail expansion of Guangzhou Taikoo Hui. The renovation program is anticipated to conclude in 2026.
