= Swire Properties =

Hong Kong property developer

Swire Properties 太古地產
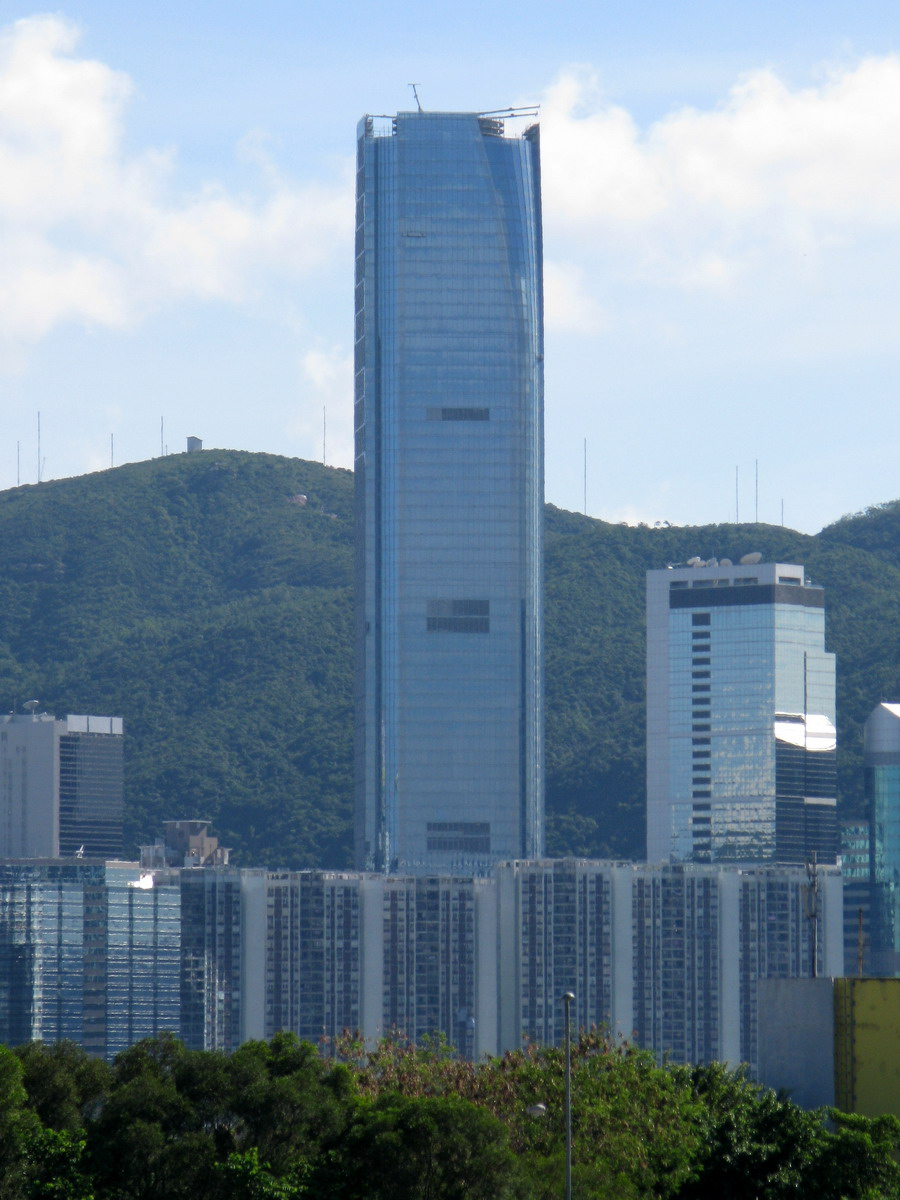
- One Island East houses Swire Properties' head office on the 64/F.
- Traded as: SEHK: 1972
- Industry: Property
- Founded: 1972
- Headquarters: Hong Kong
Key people
Guy Bradley	(Chairman)
Tim Blackburn	(CEO)
- Number of employees: 4,500
- Parent: Public listed Swire Pacific
- Website: Swire Properties

Swire Properties
- Traditional Chinese: 太古地產
- Simplified Chinese: 太古地产
Transcriptions
Standard Mandarin
- Hanyu Pinyin: Tàigǔ Dìchǎn
Yue: Cantonese
- Jyutping: taai^{3} gu^{2} dei^{6} caan^{2}

Swire Properties Limited (Chinese: 太古地產) is a property developer, owner and operator of mixed-use, principally commercial properties in Hong Kong and mainland China. Founded and headquartered in Hong Kong in 1972, Swire Properties is a property developer in Hong Kong, and is listed on the Stock Exchange of Hong Kong. Including subsidiaries, it employs around 4,500 people. The company is, in turn, a subsidiary of the publicly listed Swire Pacific Limited (part of Swire Group).

== Business scope ==
Swire Properties operates in three main areas:

1. property investment – property investment, namely the development, leasing and management of commercial, retail and residential properties as a long-term investment
2. property trading – property trading, that is the development and construction of properties, principally luxury residential apartments, for sale
3. hotel investment and operations (Swire Hotels)

== Senior leadership ==
- Chairman: Guy Bradley (since August 2021)
- Chief Executive: Tim Blackburn (since August 2021)

=== Former chairmen ===
- James Hughes-Hallett (1999–2005)
- Keith Kerr (2005–2009)
- Christopher Pratt (2009–2014)
- John Slosar (2014–2018)
- Merlin Swire (2018–2021)

=== Former chief executives ===
- Keith Kerr (1998–2005)
- Martin Cubbon (2009–2014)
- Guy Bradley (2015–2021)

== History ==
=== Founding ===
Swire Properties was established in Hong Kong in 1972, with interests held by B&S Industries Limited and The Taikoo Dockyard and Engineering Company of Hong Kong Limited, which was renamed as Swire Pacific Limited in 1974. In 1975, Taikoo Shing, built on the former Taikoo Dockyard, became the first major development by Swire Properties. Tung Ting Mansion, the first block of Taikoo Shing, was offered for sale in January 1976.

In the following year, Taikoo Sugar Refinery Compound was renamed to the Taikoo Trading Estate (which is now known as Taikoo Place).

Swire Properties was briefly listed for the first time on the Stock Exchange of Hong Kong in 1977. Its shares were also traded on the London Stock Exchange.

=== Expansion into the US ===
In 1976, Swire Properties decided to invest in US by acquiring interests in Berkeley Hambro Inc, a developer headquartered in Tampa, Florida. Two years later, Swire Properties acquired interests in a joint venture with a Florida Cheezem Development Corporation Limited, to develop a 33.6-acre site on Claughton Island, Miami. Claughton Island was later renamed Brickell Key.

=== Pacific Place, Festival Walk and Citygate development ===
In 1985 to 1986, Swire Properties purchased the former Victoria Barracks in Admiralty and land surrounding it. The land was later redeveloped into Pacific Place, which was a hub consisting of a shopping mall, two office towers, serviced apartments and three five-star hotels. Pacific Place was fully completed in 1991. An office tower extension, Pacific Place Three, was completed in 2004. In 1999, StarCrest, a residential project adjacent to the Pacific Place hub, was completed, marking the revitalization of the entire Star Street area in Wan Chai.

In 1998, Festival Walk was completed, which offered retail space spanning seven levels, an office tower and a public transportation terminus. In 2011, Swire Properties sold its 100% interest in Festival Walk to Mapletree, a Singapore-based developer for HK$18.8 billion. The property transaction was the most expensive ever conducted in Hong Kong's history.

In 1999, Swire Properties completed Citygate in Tung Chung, Lantau, as well as Tung Chung Crescent and Seaview Crescent, two residential projects providing in total almost 3,700 units. In 2006, the retail mall of Citygate was renamed Citygate Outlets, Hong Kong's first outlet shopping mall.

=== Expansion into the mainland ===
In 2007, Swire Properties acquired the Beijing Sanlitun project, which comprises a low-rise mixed commercial scheme comprising retail development and a 99-room hotel. The southern portion of Sanlitun Village was also opened the following year. The northern portion of Sanlitun Village was opened in 2010, marking the official launch of the entire Sanlitun Village development. It was later renamed Taikoo Li Sanlitun.

In 2011, Taikoo Hui Guangzhou was opened in Guangzhou, and INDIGO was opened in Beijing. Sino-Ocean Taikoo Li Chengdu was officially launched in 2015 and HKRI Taikoo Hui was opened in Shanghai in 2017.

=== Public listing ===
In 2010, Swire Properties attempted to split from Swire Pacific and undergo an IPO, but in the end postponed due to adverse economic situation.

In 2012, Swire Properties was successfully listed by way of introduction on the Main Board of the Stock Exchange of Hong Kong. Its stock code is 1972 and its shares began trading on 18 January.

== Hong Kong portfolio ==
Swire Properties' investment portfolio comprises office and retail properties, serviced apartments, hotels and luxury residential projects.

=== Commercial projects ===
Swire Properties' investment portfolio in Hong Kong totals over 15.9 million sq ft (over 1.47 million m^{2}) of gross floor area. Taikoo Place, Cityplaza, Pacific Place and Citygate Outlets are the company's key holdings.

==== Taikoo Place ====
Taikoo Place is a decentralised office area with a hub of 8 interconnected Grade-A office towers with a total gross floor area of over 5 million sq ft (approximately 464,000 m^{2}). Tong Chong Street, located at Taikoo Place, offers an open-air plaza for hosting cultural and entertainment events, streetside performances and charitable fundraising. The new 7,000-sq ft multi-purpose venue Artistree will aim for greater scope of arts programmes, with a focus on the performing arts. The ArtisTree has also been designed as a platform for the emergence of art forms and a range of original works presented for the first time in Asia. A co-working space Blueprint was launched in 2014 to aim to foster entrepreneurship in Hong Kong.

List of office buildings in Taikoo Place

- Devon House (1993; now renamed to FWD Tower)
- Dorset House (1994)
- PCCW Tower (1994)
- Lincoln House (1998)
- Oxford House (1999)
- Cambridge House (2003)
- One Island East (2008)
- Berkshire House (2014)
- One Taikoo Place (2018)
- Two Taikoo Place (2022)

==== Cityplaza ====
Cityplaza features Hong Kong Island's biggest shopping mall by gross floor area, as well as three Grade-A office towers with a total GFA of 3.27 million sq ft (approximately 304,000 m^{2}). The lifestyle business hotel run by Swire Hotels, EAST, was opened in 2010 and features 345 guest rooms. Cityplaza sits atop Tai Koo MTR station.

==== Pacific Place ====
Pacific Place is a mixed-use development comprising a shopping mall, three office towers, serviced apartments and four hotels in Admiralty. The Mall, Pacific Place offers over 711,000 sq ft (over 66,000 m^{2}) GFA of retail space, and houses approximately 140 retail and catering outlets. Pacific Place is directly connected to Admiralty MTR station.

==== Citygate ====
Citygate Outlets is located in Tung Chung near the Hong Kong International Airport on Lantau Island. Citygate Outlets consists of six levels of shops, a majority of which are outlets selling clothing and sportswear. The rest of Citygate complex is made up of a nine-storey office building (ONE Citygate) with a total GFA of approximately 161,000 sq ft (approximately 15,000 m^{2}), and Novotel Citygate Hong Kong, a 440-room hotel managed by Novotel.

=== Residential projects ===
List of residential projects by Swire Properties

Hong Kong Island	Kowloon	New Territories	Outlying Islands
Westland Gardens (1975)	Beacon Heights (1987)	Greenfields (1998)	Tung Chung Crescent (1999)
Rocky Bank (1981)	Village Gardens (1987)	Belair Monte (1998)	Seaview Crescent (2002)
Westlands Court (1985)	Sunningdale (1997)	Ocean Shores (2003)	WHITESANDS (2015)
Taikoo Shing (1987)	Dunbar Place (2013)		
Harbour Heights (1988)
The Albany (1989)
Lei King Wan (1989)
Parkvale (1989)
Pacific Place Apartments (1990)
Robinson Place (1994)
Island Place (1996)
The Floridian (1997)
Fairwinds (1998)
StarCrest (1999)
Les Saisons (2001)
The Orchards (2003)
3 Coombe Road (2003)
Island Lodge (2009)
Opus Hong Kong (2012)
AZURA (2012)
ARGENTA (2013)
Mount Parker Residences (2013)
AREZZO (2015)
Taikoo Place Apartments (2015)
EIGHT STAR STREET (2022)
The Headland Residences (2026)

== Mainland China portfolio ==
The company has an attributable portfolio amounting to over 9.4 million sq ft (over 870,000 m^{2}), including five mixed-use developments in Beijing, Guangzhou, Chengdu and Shanghai.

=== Zhang Yuan, Shanghai ===
Zhang Yuan, historically known as the “Best Garden in Shanghai”, has been revitalized. Located in the core area of West Nanjing Road, Zhangyuan is the largest, best preserved and most diverse Shikumen courtyard in Shanghai. The area dates back to 1882 and is a public garden for cultural and recreational events in Shanghai. With a total gross floor area of approximately 60,000 square meters, this project will combine retail, commercial, office, hotel, residential, art museum and performing arts center. With an underground area of more than 70,000 square meters, it will connect three metro lines (Line 2, Line 12 and Line 13) at Nanjing Road West Station.

=== Taikoo Li Sanlitun, Beijing ===
Taikoo Li Sanlitun was Swire properties' first retail development in mainland China and is situated in the Chaoyang District of Beijing, . Featuring an open-plan lane-driven design, the development comprises two neighbouring retail sites and a hotel, The Opposite House. In total, the project has a GFA of approximately 1.47 million sq ft (over 136,000 m^{2}) and is home to over 220 retail outlets.

=== INDIGO, Beijing ===
INDIGO is a retail-led mixed-use project with a total GFA of over 1.89 million sq ft (approximately 176,000 m^{2}) situated in Chaoyang District of Beijing, . It consists of a shopping mall, a Grade-A office tower (ONE INDIGO), as well as a 369-room business hotel, EAST, Beijing. The development officially opened in 2012 and is linked to the Beijing Subway Line 14.

=== Taikoo Hui Guangzhou ===
Taikoo Hui Guangzhou is Swire Properties' largest investment property in mainland China with a total GFA of approximately 3.84 million sq ft (approximately 357,000 m^{2}). Situated in Tianhe Central Business District of Guangzhou, TaiKoo Hui is located at a transportation hub with direct access to Line 1 and Line 3 of the Guangzhou metro. TaiKoo Hui comprises a shopping mall, two Grade-A office towers, the Mandarin Oriental Guangzhou with serviced apartments and a cultural centre.

=== Sino-Ocean Taikoo Li Chengdu ===
Sino-Ocean Taikoo Li Chengdu, formerly The Daci Temple project, is a retail-led mixed-use development located in the Jinjiang District of Chengdu near the Chunxi Road shopping district. It is a large-scale development of over 2.86 million sq ft (over 265,000 m^{2}) and consists of an open-plan, lane-driven mall, a boutique hotel The Temple House with 100 guest rooms and 42 serviced apartments, and a Grade-A office tower Pinnacle One. The complex is accessible from the Chunxi Road interchange station of Metro Lines 2 and 3 and is located next to the 1,600-year-old Daci Temple.

=== HKRI Taikoo Hui, Shanghai ===
HKRI Taikoo Hui is a large-scale retail-led mixed-use development. It is located on Nanjing West Road in Jing'an District, Shanghai. The development comprises a retail mall, two offices towers and three hotels/serviced apartments of approximately 3.46 million sq ft (over 321,000 m^{2}). HKRI Taikoo Hui was officially opened in 2017.

=== Taikoo Li Qiantan, Shanghai ===
In February 2018, Swire Properties entered into a 50:50 joint venture with Shanghai Newbund Company to develop a retail project with an expected total gross floor area of approximately 1.33 million sq ft (124,000 m^{2}) in Qiantan, Pudong New District in Shanghai. The project will feature an open-plan, lane-driven concept and has been designed to blend elements found in nature with contemporary architecture. In January 2019 it was revealed that the project would be called Taikoo Li Qiantan and is expected to open in phases from the end of 2020.

== United States portfolio ==
Swire Properties Inc., established in Miami since 1979, is one of South Florida's international developers of urban office, hotel and condo real estate.

=== Brickell Key Development ===
Swire Properties has invested US$1 billion in a master‐planned development of Brickell Key in Miami, Florida. This island mixed-use community includes two office buildings, commercial retail, eight condominium towers and the Mandarin Oriental, Miami.

=== Brickell City Centre ===
Brickell City Centre is an urban mixed-use development in the Brickell financial district in Miami, Florida. Phase I of the development consists of a shopping centre, EAST Miami hotel and serviced apartments, two office buildings and two residential towers. Phase II of the development is planned to consist of an 80-storey mixed-use tower comprising retail, office, hotel and residential space. The GFA of both phases totals 6.352 million sq ft (approximately 590,000 m^{2}).

As the largest private-sector project under construction at the time in Miami, Brickell City Centre commenced construction work on Phase I in 2012. The first phase of construction was completed and the centre opened in November 2016. Additional phases are currently planned with construction of a new tower slated to being in 2023.

== Singapore portfolio ==
In December 2012, Swire Properties agreed to acquire eight residential units at Hampton Court, 2 Draycott Park in Singapore as investment properties.

== Swire Hotels ==
see Swire Hotels

Hotel portfolio of Swire Properties

Hong Kong	Mainland China	US
The Upper House	The Opposite House (Beijing)	EAST, Miami
EAST, Hong Kong	East, Beijing	Mandarin Oriental Miami
The Headland Hotel	The Temple House (Chengdu)	
Island Shangri La, Hong Kong	The Middle House (Shanghai)	
JW Marriott Hotel Hong Kong	Mandarin Oriental Guangzhou	
Conrad Hong Kong	The Sukhothai Shanghai	
The Silveri Hong Kong - M Gallery
Novotel Hong Kong Citygate
