= Wardley Street, Hong Kong =

Former street in Hong Kong

Historically a street known as Wardley Street was located metres west of Bank Street, between Connaught Road Central and Queen's Road Central. During the early 1930s, an extra portion of land was required for the construction of the third generation of HSBC Building, which required the demolition of both the southern portion (between Des Voeux Road Central and Queen's Road Central) of Wardley Street and the western part of the former City Hall.

The first generation of the bank's headquarters bearing the 1 Queen's Road Central address on Marine Lot No. 104 was the Wardley House, named after W. H. Wardley and Company, sharing with the Chartered Mercantile Bank, and some subsidiaries of the bank were named Wardley into the 1990s. The flooring of the atrium of the present-day HSBC Building features the road grid of Central in the 1910s.
