= List of demolished buildings and structures in Hong Kong =

The following list is of buildings and structures in Hong Kong that have been demolished or destroyed. Buildings are arranged by the historical period in which they were constructed.

== First British era (1841-1945) ==
Name	Year completed	Year demolished	Location	Notes	Photo
Dent's Fountain	1864	1933	In front of the old City Hall, present day HSBC Building	Donated by Dent & Co.	
Hongkong Hotel	1868	1952			
City Hall	1869	1936			
Beaconsfield Arcade	1878	1917			
HSBC Building (second)	1886	1934			
Queen's College	1889	1948			
Peak Hotel	1890	1938			
Central Market (second)	1895	1937			
Hong Kong Club (second)	1897	1981	4 Connaught Road, Central		
Queen's Building	1899	1963	4-5 Connaught Road, Central	Designed by Leigh and Orange.	
Mountain Lodge (second)	1900	1946			
Alexandra Building	1904	1952			
Marble Hall (Chater House)	1904	1953			
Prince's Building	1904	1963	1 Des Voeux Road, Central	Designed by Leigh and Orange.	
King's Building	1905	1958	11 Connaught Road, Central		
The Fairview (Mok House)	1911	1963	41A Conduit Road	Built for Mok Kon Sang. In 1951 became Foreign Correspondents' Club. Featured prominently in Love is a Many-Splendored Thing (1955).	
General Post Office (second)	1911	1976			
Kowloon Station	1916	1978		Designed by Arthur Benison Hubback. Clock tower preserved during demolition.	
Queen's Pier (first)	1925	1955			
Central Fire Station	1926	1982			
Lee Theatre	1927	1991			
Gloucester Building	1931	1977			
HSBC Building (third)	1935	1978			
Ho Tung Gardens	1937	2013		Designed by Palmer and Turner. Built on the site of C. D. Wilkinson's house "The Falls."	

== Second British era (1945-1997) ==
Name	Year completed	Year demolished	Location	Notes	Photo
Alexandra House	1952	1974			
Edinburgh Place Ferry Pier	1957	2006			
Chartered Bank Building	1959	1986			
Kai Tak Airport Terminal	1962			Opened 2 November 1962 by Sir Robert Black.	
Union House	1962	1998		Later known as Swire House. Demolished to make way for the Chater House.	
Beaconsfield House	1963	1995			
Hong Kong Hilton	1963	1995			
P&O Building (fifth)	1965	1980			
Connaught Building	1966	2008	55 Connaught Road, Central	Later known as Crocodile House II. Demolished to make way for 50 Connaught Road.	
Furama Hotel	1973	2001			

== See also ==
- Architecture of Hong Kong
- Heritage conservation in Hong Kong
- List of buildings and structures in Hong Kong
- List of the oldest buildings and structures in Hong Kong
