= History of Hong Kong (1800s–1930s) =

Hong Kong (1800s–1930s) oversaw the founding of the new crown colony of Hong Kong under the British Empire. After the First Opium War, the territory was ceded by the Qing Empire to the United Kingdom of Great Britain and Ireland through Treaty of Nanjing (1842) and Convention of Peking (1860) in perpetuity. Together with additional land that was leased to the British under the Convention for the Extension of Hong Kong Territory (1898), Hong Kong became one of the first parts of East Asia to undergo industrialisation.

== Territorial establishment ==
=== Beginning of trade ===
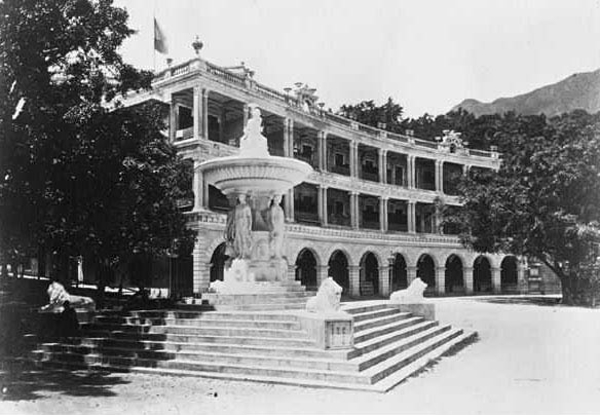
Dent's Fountain, also known as City Hall's Fountain (near the rear side of present-day Bank of China Building), was built in 1864 and demolished in 1933.

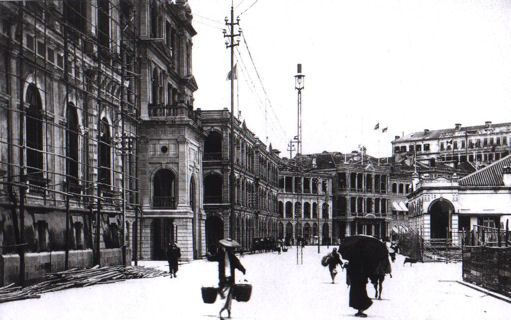
Streets of Hong Kong, 1865

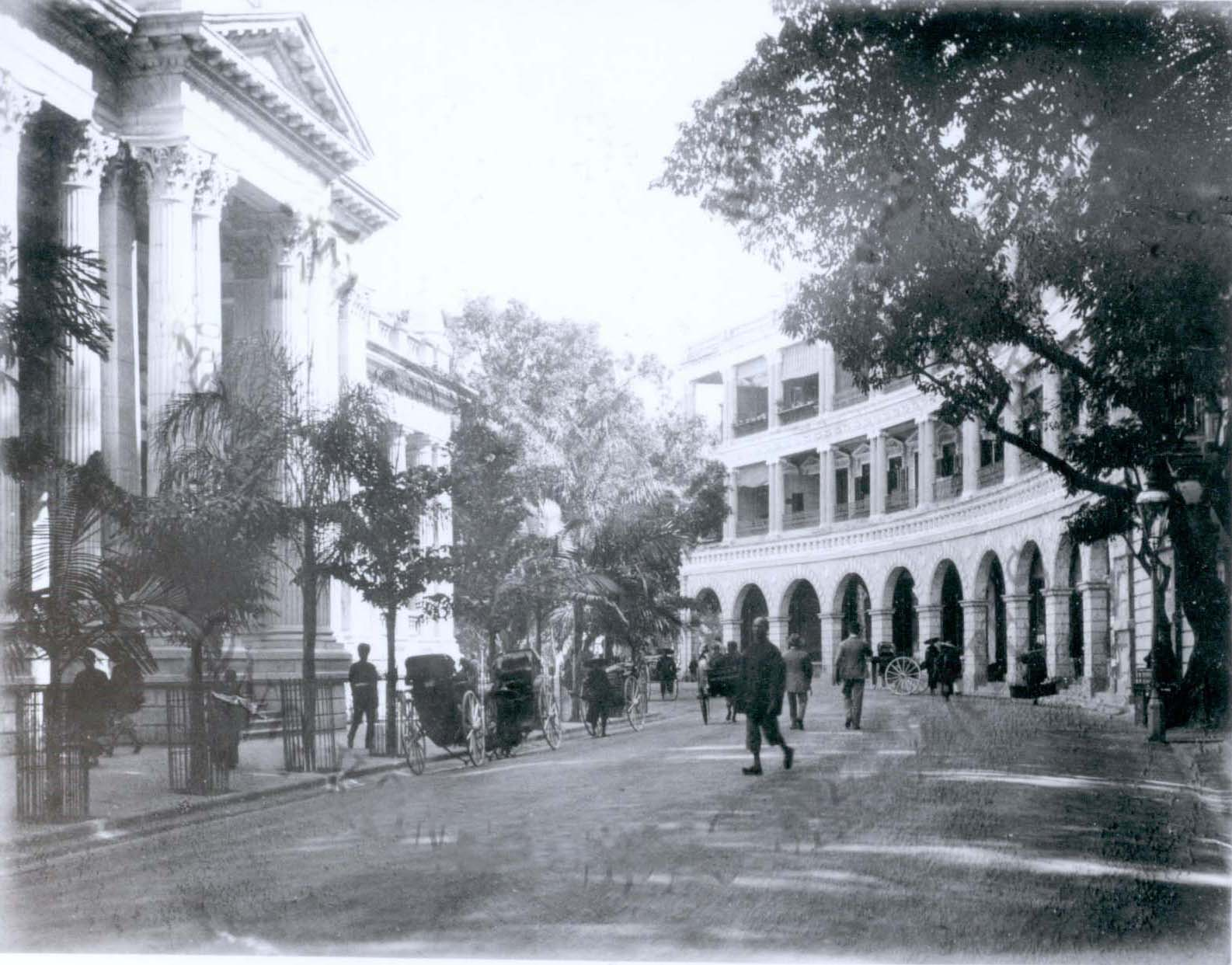
Beaconsfield Arcade, Hong Kong, c.1890. The building on the left is the HSBC building (second design)

China was the main supplier of its native tea to the British, whose annual domestic consumption reached 30,050,000 pounds (13,600,000 kg) in 1830, an average of 1.04 pounds (0.47 kg) per head of population.

From the British economic standpoint, Chinese tea was a crucial item since it provided massive wealth for the taipans—foreign (especially British) businessmen in China—while the duty on tea accounted for 10% of the government's income. Some of the earliest items sold to China in exchange for tea were British clocks, watches and musical boxes known as "sing-songs". However, these were not enough to compensate for the trade imbalance and the insistence by the Chinese that they be paid in silver. Opium exports from India after 1830 provided the silver needed to balance the trade. Lin Zexu, a special Chinese commissioner appointed by the Qing Daoguang Emperor, wrote a letter to Queen Victoria in 1839 taking a stance against the acceptance of opium in trade. He confiscated more than 20,000 chests of opium already in Hong Kong, which had already been used years earlier as a transhipment point, and supervised their destruction.

=== Confrontation ===
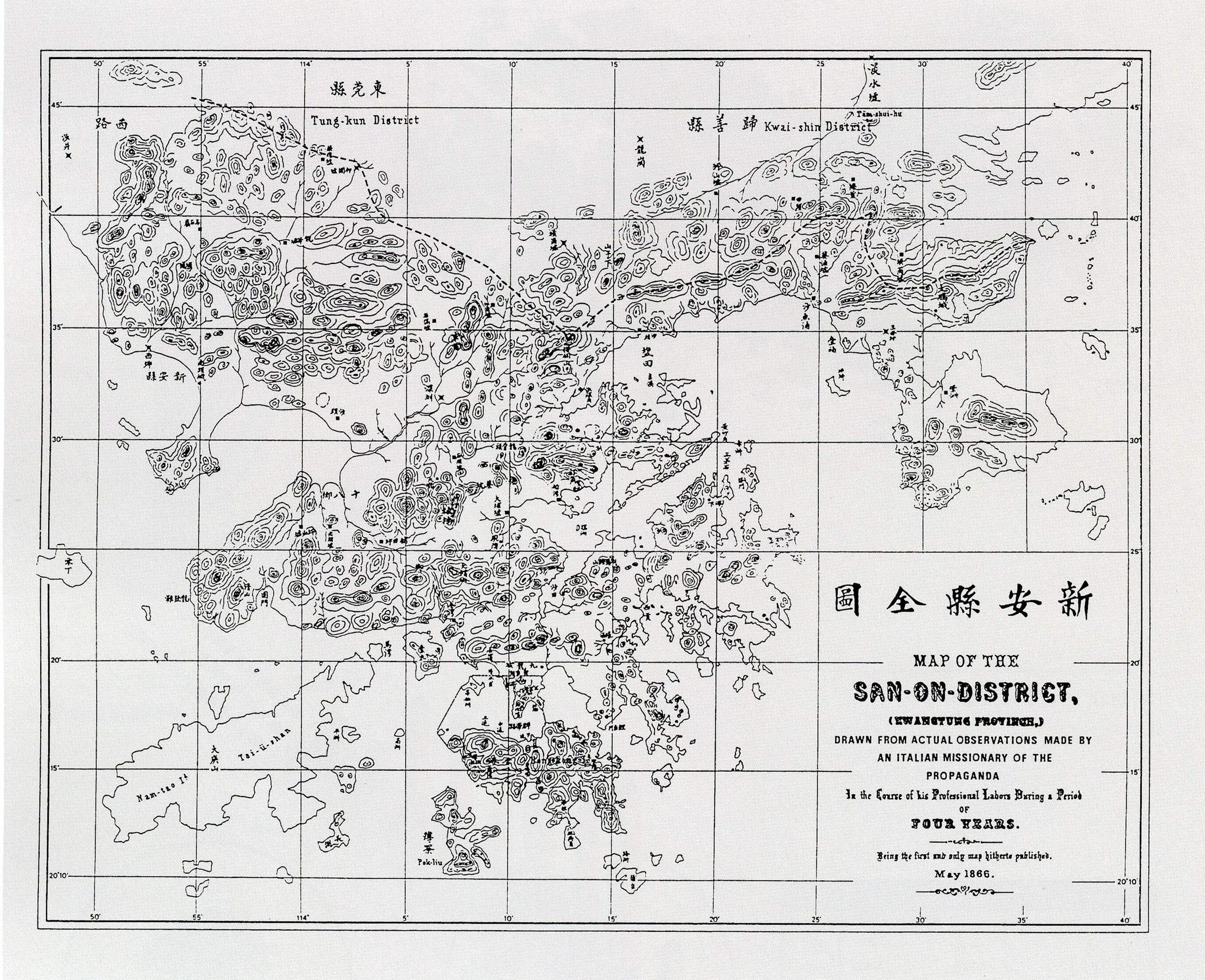
1866 map of Xin'an County (here spelled "San On" and later called Bao'an) with the boundary with Kowloon and Hong Kong marked

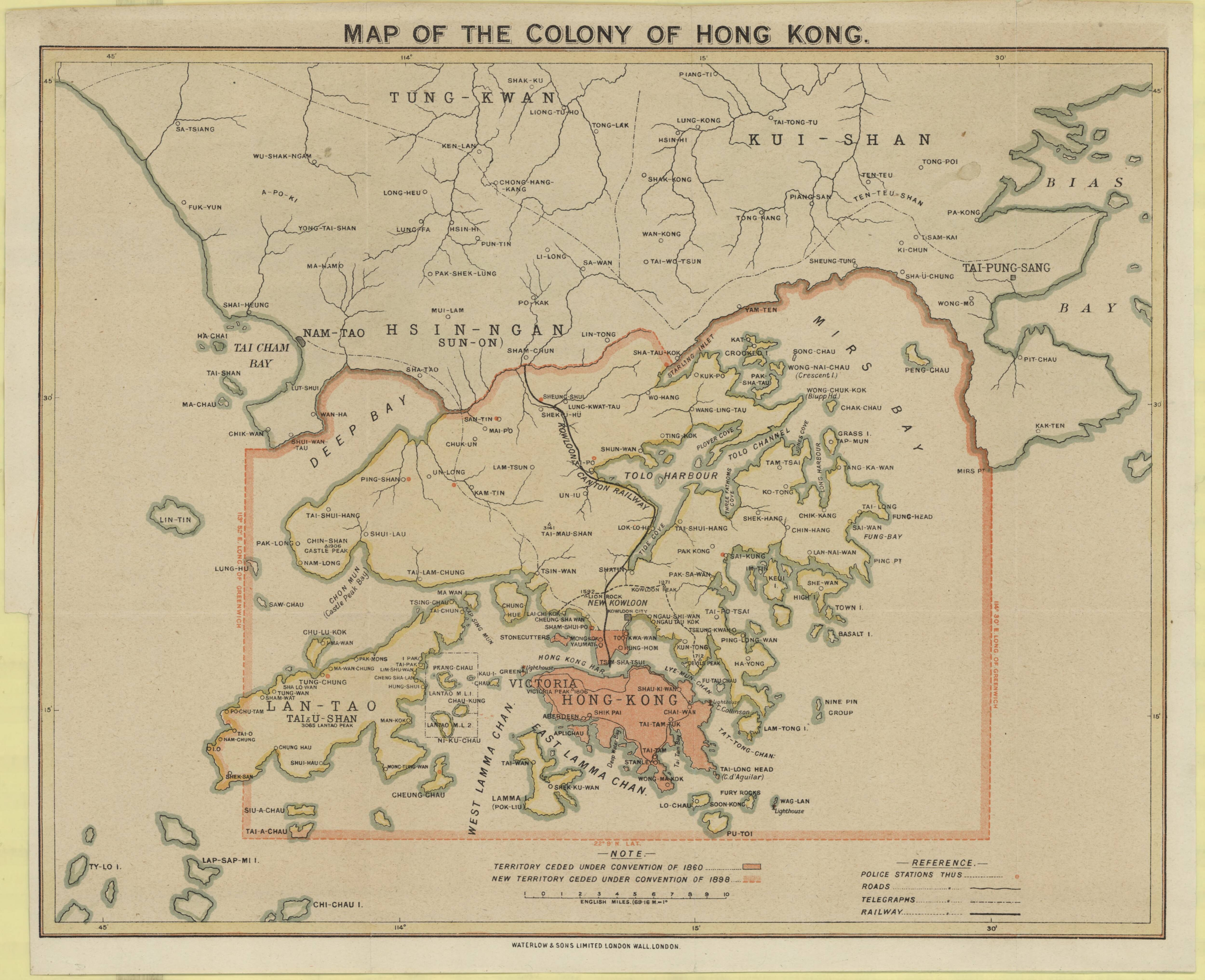
1900 map of Hong Kong and Kowloon with the New Territories acquired by the British in 1898

Great Britain acquired Hong Kong Island in 1842, Kowloon Peninsula in 1860, and leased the New Territories rent-free in 1898.

London saw the destruction of British products as an insult and sent the first expeditionary force to the region. The First Opium War (1839–1842) began at the hands of British plenipotentiary Charles Elliot of the Royal Navy and Captain Anthony Blaxland Stransham of the Royal Marines. After a series of Chinese defeats, Hong Kong Island, then part of Guangdong's Xin'an County (known as Bao'an County in ancient times), was occupied by the British on 20 January 1841. Commander (later Admiral) Edward Belcher, aboard HMS Sulphur, landed in Hong Kong on 25 January 1841. Possession Street still exists to mark the event, with Belcher Bay named after Belcher. Commodore Sir Gordon Bremer raised the Union Jack and claimed Hong Kong as a colony on 26 January 1841. He erected naval store sheds there in April 1841.

The island was first used by the British as a staging post during the war, and while the East India Company intended to establish a permanent base on Zhoushan (Chushan) Island, Elliot took it upon himself to claim the island on a permanent basis. The ostensible authority for the occupation was negotiated between Elliot and the Qing Imperial Commissioner, Qishan. The Convention of Chuenpi had been concluded but went unrecognised by the Qing court at Peking. Subsequently, Hong Kong Island was formally ceded to Britain in 1842 under the Treaty of Nanking, when the territory became a crown colony.

The Opium War was ostensibly fought to liberalise trade with China. With a base in Hong Kong, British traders, opium dealers, and merchants including Jardine Matheson & Co. and Dent & Co. launched the city which would become the free trade nexus of the East. American opium traders and merchant bankers such as the Russell, Perkins and Forbes families would soon join the trade.

On signature of the 1860 Convention of Peking, which marked the end of formal ended hostilities in the Second Opium War (1856–1858), Britain acquired the area south of Boundary Street on the Kowloon Peninsula rent-free under a perpetual lease. Later, in 1898, the Qing government reluctantly agreed to the Convention between Great Britain and China Respecting an Extension of Hong Kong Territory (also known as the Second Convention of Peking) that compelled China to cede a further area north of Boundary Street to the Sham Chun River along with more than two hundred nearby islands. Seen by the British government as vital to safeguard the defensive capabilities of Hong Kong, these areas became collectively known as the New Territories. The 99-year lease would expire at midnight on 30 June, 1997.

== Demographics ==
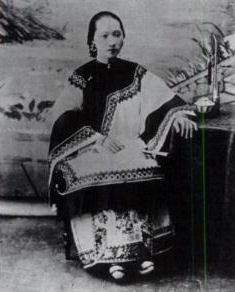
1890 woman in traditional dress

=== Population ===
When the Union Flag was raised over Possession Point on 26 January 1841, the population of Hong Kong island was about 6,000, mostly Tanka fishermen and Hakka charcoal burners living in a number of coastal villages. In the 1850s large numbers of Chinese would emigrate from China to Hong Kong due to the Taiping Rebellion. Other events such as floods, typhoons and famine in mainland China would also play a role in establishing Hong Kong as a place to escape the mayhem. According to the census of 1865, Hong Kong had a population of 125,504, of which some 2,000 were Americans and Europeans. In 1914 despite an exodus of 60,000 Chinese fearing an attack on the colony during World War I, Hong Kong's population continued to increase from 530,000 in 1916 to 725,000 in 1925 and 1.6 million by 1941.

=== Segregation ===
The establishment of the free port made Hong Kong a major entrepôt from the start, attracting people from China and Europe alike. The society remained racially segregated and polarised due to British colonial policies and attitudes. Despite the rise of a British-educated Chinese upper class by the late 19th century, race laws such as the Peak Reservation Ordinance prevented Chinese from living in elite areas like Victoria Peak. Politically, the majority Chinese population also had little to no official governmental influence throughout much of the early years. There were, however, a small number of Chinese elites that the British governors relied on, including Sir Kai Ho and Robert Hotung. They accepted their place in the Hong Kong hierarchy, and served as main communicators and mediators between the government and the Chinese population. Sir Kai Ho was an unofficial member of the Legislative Council. Robert Hotung wanted Chinese citizens to recognise Hong Kong as the new home after the fall of China's last dynasty in 1911. As a millionaire with financial influence, he emphasised that no part of the demographics was purely indigenous.

== Culture ==
=== Lifestyle ===
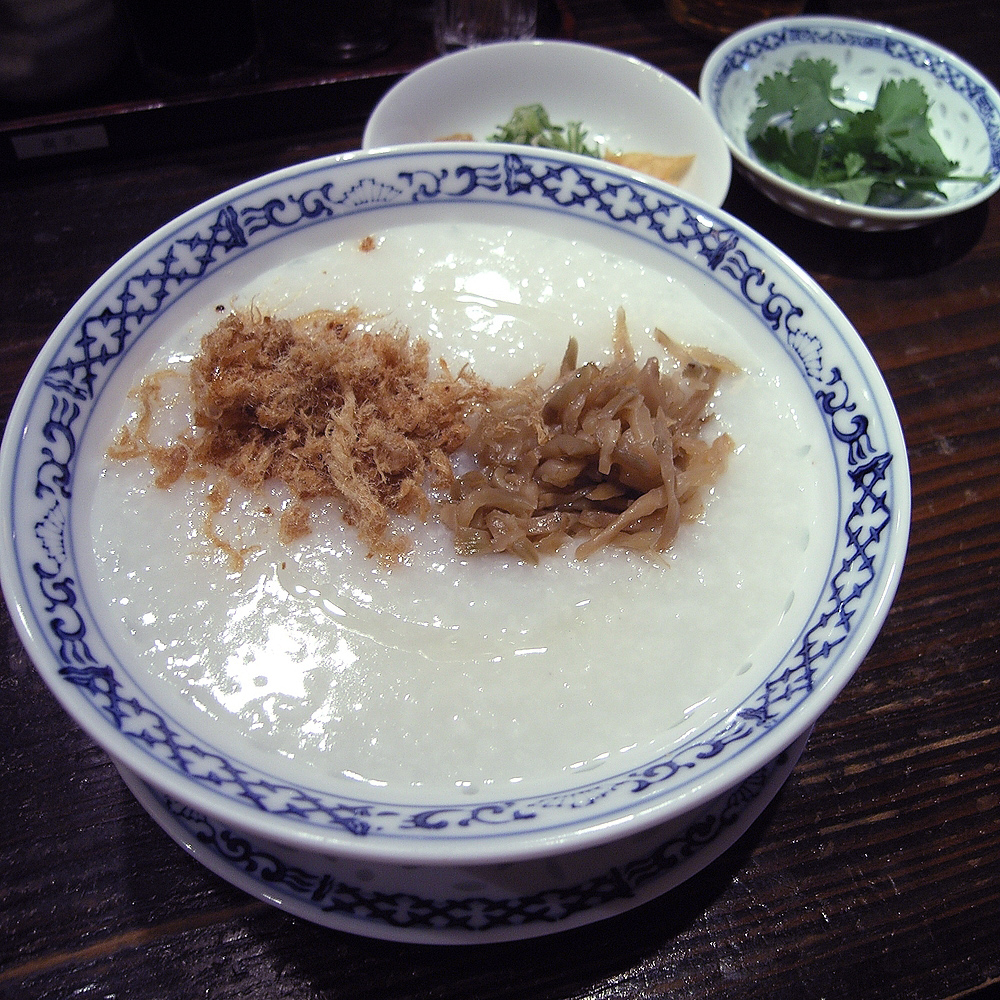
Congee, a popular colonial era breakfast

The east portion of Colonial Hong Kong was mostly dedicated to the British; filled with race courses, parade grounds, barracks, cricket and polo fields. The west portion was filled with Chinese shops, crowded markets and tea houses. The Hong Kong tea culture began in this period and evolved into yum cha. One of the most common breakfasts was congee with fish and barley. In the mid-19th century many of the merchants would sell silk, jade and consult feng shui to open shops that favoured better spiritual arrangements. Other lower ranked groups like coolies arrived with the notion that hard work would better position them for the future. Due to the commercial success of merchants, boatmen, carters and fishermen there, Hong Kong overtook China's most populous port in Canton. By 1880 Hong Kong's port would handle 27% of the mainland's export and 37% of imports. A British traveller, Isabella Bird, described Hong Kong in the 1870s as a colony filled with comforts and entertainment only a Victorian society would be able to enjoy. Other descriptions mentioned courts, hotels, post offices, shops, city hall complexes, museums, libraries and structures in impressive manner for the era. Many European businessmen went to Hong Kong to do business. They were referred to as tai-pans or "bigshot". One of the more notable Tai-pan hangout spots was the Hong Kong Club at Queen's Road.

=== Education ===
In 1861, Frederick Stewart would become the founder of Hong Kong education system bringing Western-style pedagogy to the East. Some have argued that his contribution is the key turning point between the group of Chinese that were able to modernise Hong Kong versus the group that did not in China. The education would bring Western-style finance, science, history, technology into the culture. The father of modern China, Sun Yat-sen was also educated in Hong Kong's Central School.

=== Law and order ===
In 1843 the legislative council was established. The governor of Hong Kong generally served as the British plenipotentiary in the far east in the early years. The Colonial Secretary would also assist in legal matters. A colonial police force was established in the 1840s to handle the high crime rate in Hong Kong. By China's standards, colonial Hong Kong's code of punishment was considered laughably loose and lenient. The lack of intimidation may have been the leading cause for the continual rise in crime. Po Leung Kuk became one of the first organisations established to deal with the abduction of women and prostitution crisis. Crime at sea was also common as some pirates had access to cutlasses and revolvers. Court sessions for criminal and admiralty matters were first held on 4 March 1844 under the aegis of the first governor, Lieutenant General Sir Henry Pottinger and the Lieutenant-governor George D'Aguilar.

=== Pandemics and disasters ===
The Third Pandemic of bubonic plague broke out in China in the 1880s. By the spring of 1894 about 100,000 were reported dead in the mainland. In May 1894 the disease erupted into Hong Kong's overcrowded Chinese quarter of Tai Ping Shan. By the end of the month, an estimated 450 people died of the illness. At its height, the epidemic was killing 100 people per day, and it killed a total of 2,552 people that year. The disease was greatly detrimental to trade and produced a temporary exodus of 100,000 Chinese from the colony. Plague continued to be a problem in the territory for the next 30 years.

On September 22, 1874 a typhoon hit Hong Kong, reaching its height by midnight. An estimated 2,000 people lost their lives in a span of just six hours.

== Economy ==
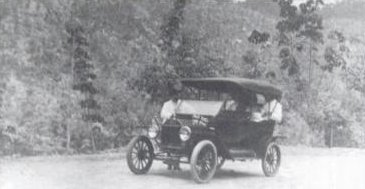
First generation of automobiles in Hong Kong

=== Transport ===
The growth of Hong Kong depended greatly on domestic transport of citizens and cargo across Victoria Harbour. The establishment of the Star Ferry and the Yaumati Ferry would prove to be vital. In 1843 the colony had built the first ship at a private shipyard. Some of the customers later included the Spanish government in the Philippines and the Chinese navy. The Peak Tram would begin in 1888 along with the Tramway service in 1904. The first railway line was also launched in 1910 as the Kowloon-Canton Railway. On land the rickshaws were extremely popular when they were first imported from Japan in 1874, since it was affordable and necessary for street merchants to haul goods. Sedan chairs were the preferred mode of the transport for the wealthy Europeans who lived on Victoria Peak due to the steep grade which ruled out rickshaws until the introduction of the Peak Tram. The first automobiles in Hong Kong had petrol-driven internal combustion engines and arrived between 1903 and 1905. Initially they were not well received by the public. Only around 1910 did the cars begin to gain appeal. Most of the owners were British. Buses operated by various independent companies flourished in the 1920s until the government formally issued franchises for the China Motor Bus and Kowloon Motor Bus companies in 1933. The flying boats were the first British aeroplanes to reach Hong Kong in 1928. By 1924 the Kai Tak Airport would also be found. The first flight service from Imperial Airways would become available by 1937 at a price of 288 pounds per ticket.

=== Hospitals and hospitality ===
Soon after the British occupied Hong Kong in 1841, Protestant and Catholic missionaries started to provide social service. Italian missionaries began to provide boy-only education to British and Chinese youth in 1843. "The Catholic French Sisters of St. Paul de Chartres" was one of the first orphanage and elderly homes, established in 1848.

In 1870 the Tung Wah Hospital became the first official hospital in Hong Kong. It handled much of the social services and was providing free vaccinations in Hong Kong Island and Kwang Tung. After raising funds for the 1877 famine in China, a number of the hospital officials became Tung Wah elites with much authority and power representing the Chinese majority. Some of the booming hotel businesses of the era included the Victoria Hotel, New Victoria Hotel and the King Edward Hotel.

=== Finance ===
In 1864 the first large scale modern bank Hong Kong Shanghai Bank would be established turning Hong Kong into the focal point of financial affairs in Asia. Its chief manager, Sir Thomas Jackson, has a statue in Statue Square. The bank first leased Wardley House at HKD 500 a month in 1864. After raising a capital of HKD 5 million, the bank opened its door in 1865. The Association of Stockbrokers would also be established in 1891.

=== Resources ===
In December 1890 the Hongkong Electric company went into production with help from Catchick Paul Chater. It was the first step in allowing the transition of gas lamps to light bulbs. Other companies like Jardine Matheson would launch the "Hong Kong Land Investment and Agency company Ltd" accumulating a wealth as large as the entire government's total revenue. (See also China Light and Power.)

== Politics ==
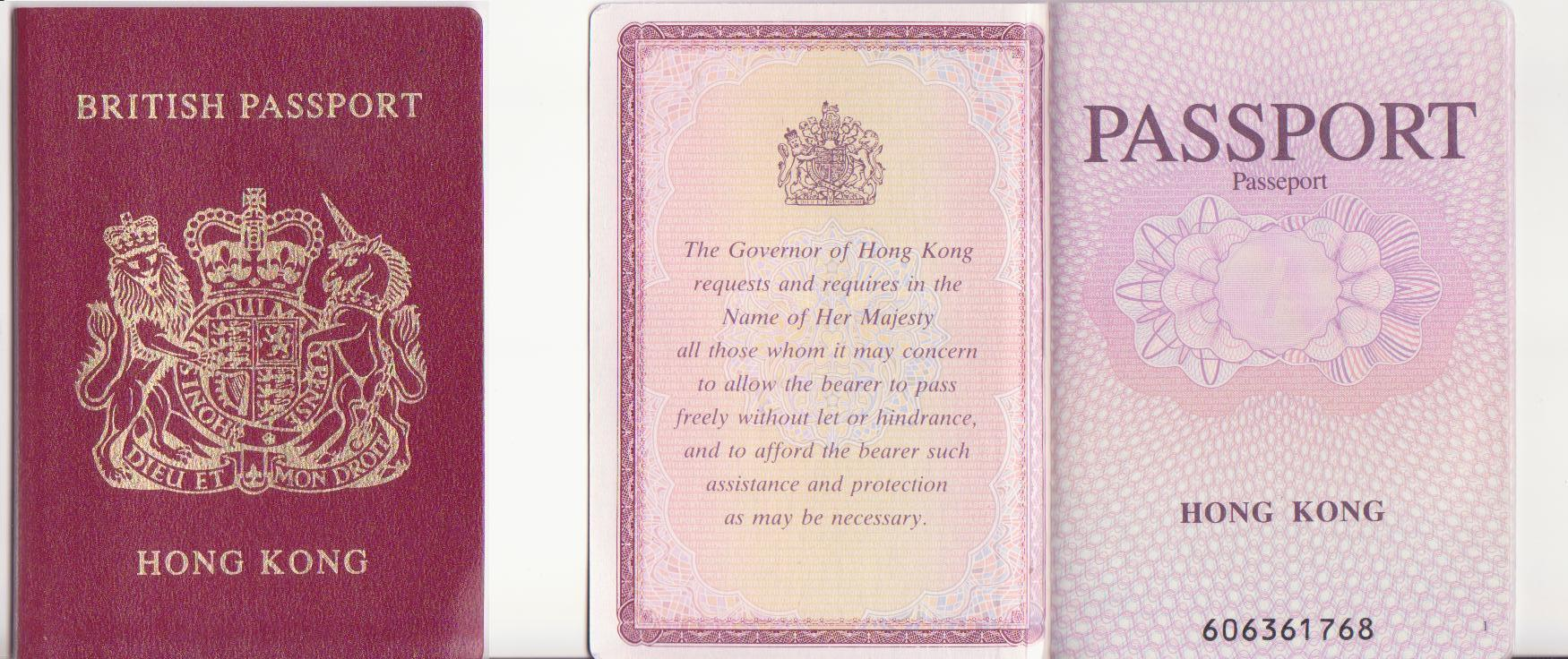
British passport issued to Hong Kong people

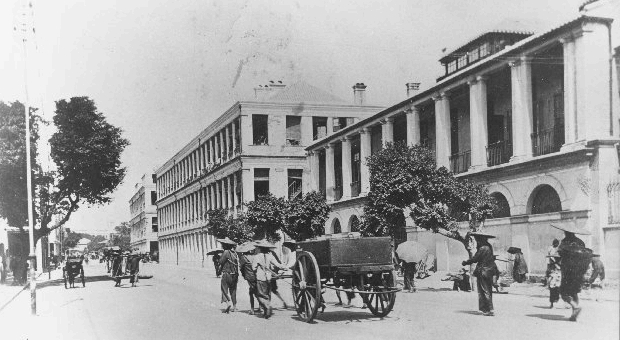
Naval Dockyard buildings (centre), Queen's Road, 1894

In 1905-1906, a protest movement in Hong Kong boycotted American goods as a result of anti-Chinese sentiment in the United States.

In 1925-1926, people in Hong Kong joined the general strike in Guangdong province (the Canton-Hong Kong strike) as part of the May Thirtieth Movement.

One observer summed up the decades as "politics, propaganda, panic, rumour, riot, revolution and refugees". The role of Hong Kong as a political safe haven for Chinese political refugees further cemented its status, and few serious attempts to revert its ownership were launched in the early 20th century. Both Chinese Communist and Nationalist agitators found refuge in the territory, when they did not actively participate in the turmoil in China. However, the dockworkers strikes in the 1920s and 1930s were widely attributed to the Communists by the authorities, and caused a backlash against them. A strike in 1920 was ended with a wage increase of HKD 32 cents. Ambrose King, in his controversial 1975 paper Administrative Absorption of Politics in Hong Kong, described the colonial Hong Kong's administration as "elite consensual government". In it, he claimed, any coalition of elites or forces capable of challenging the legitimacy of Hong Kong's administrative structure would be co-opted by the existing apparatus through the appointment of leading political activists, business figures and other elites to oversight committees, by granting them British honours, and by bringing them into elite institutions like Hong Kong's horse racing clubs. He called this "synarchy", an extension of John K. Fairbank's use of the word to describe the mechanisms of government under the late Qing dynasty in China. When modern China began after the fall of the last dynasty, one of the first political statements made in Hong Kong was the immediate change from long queue hairstyles to short haircuts. In 1938, Guangzhou fell to the hands of the Japanese, Hong Kong was considered a strategic military outpost for all trades in the far east. Though Winston Churchill assured that Hong Kong was an "impregnable fortress", it was taken as a reality check response since the British Army actually stretched too thin to battle on two fronts.

== See also ==
- Thirteen Factories
- The Hongs
- Tai-Pan (novel)
- British Hong Kong
- Hong Kong Royal Instructions
- Hong Kong Letters Patent
