= Beaconsfield House =

Building in Central, Hong Kong

Coordinates: 22.2796°N 114.1605°E

- 拱北行
- Beaconsfield House, Hong Kong, c.1966
- Interactive map of the Beaconsfield House area

General information
- Type: Government offices
- Location: 4 Queen's Road, Central, Hong Kong
- Opening: 8 June 1963
- Destroyed: 1995
- Owner: HK Government

Technical details
- Floor count: 6
- Lifts/elevators: 1

Beaconsfield House (Chinese: 拱北行) was a government office building in Hong Kong's Central district.

Built in 1963, the building was home to the Information Services Department until it was demolished along with the neighbouring Hong Kong Hilton in 1995, and Garden Road Multi-storey Car Park Building in 1998, to make way for the Cheung Kong Center.

== Plot history ==
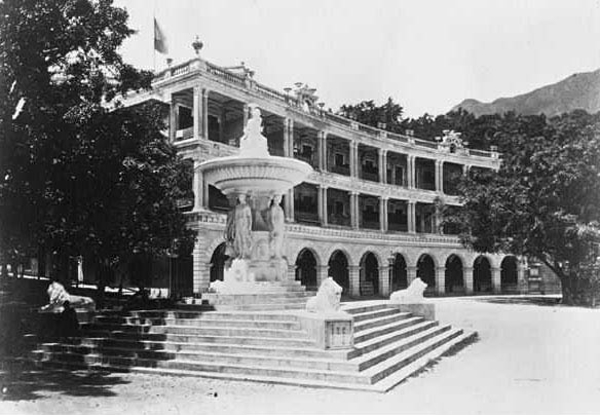
Beaconsfield Arcade along Queen's Road Central, with Dent's Fountain, c.1890

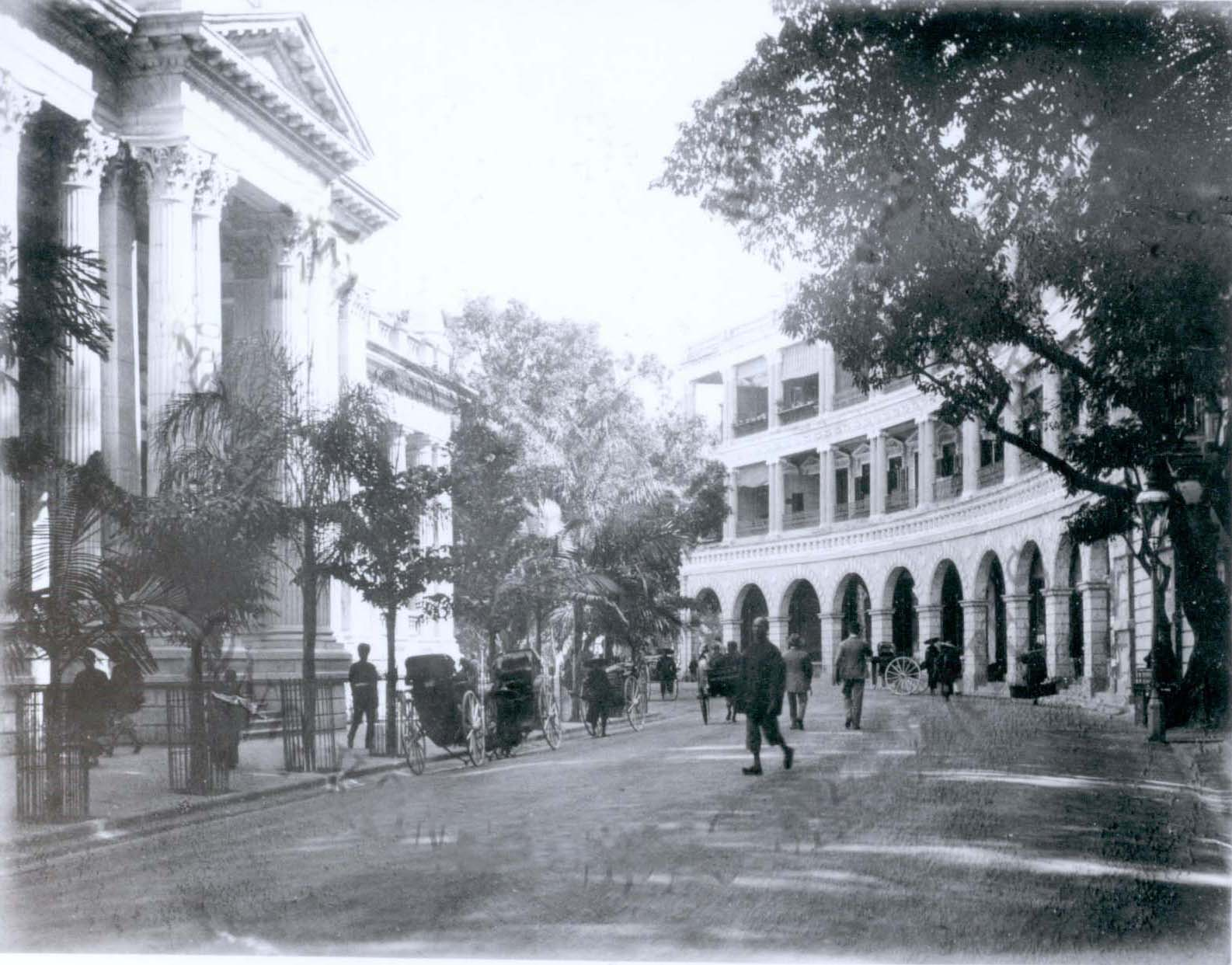
Beaconsfield Arcade, Hong Kong, c.1890. The building on the left is the HSBC building (second design)

The 18,300 sq ft (1,700 m^{2}) site was carved out of a rocky hill on the shore of Victoria Harbour. In 1841, Hong Kong's Deputy Superintendent of Trade and acting administrator, Alexander Johnstone, had the upper part of the hill levelled to build a home. The slope below was cut away to provide space for stables and outbuildings, and the rock and earth were used for reclamation.

== First generation building ==
Beaconsfield House site was originally home to the Beaconsfield Arcade (so named for Benjamin Disraeli, Lord Beaconsfield), built in 1878 by Emanuel R Belilios. Belilios, a Calcutta-born Sephardi Jew who was at that time a Hong Kong Bank director and LegCo member, sold it to the government in 1898 under some controversy – the Legco Public Works Committee resolution to acquire it passed on Mr Belilios' own vote over a suppressed protest for pecuniary interest disqualification. Across the street from Hong Kong Bank itself and City Hall. Dent's Fountain was donated by Dent & Co. in 1864.

Beaconsfield was also named for a government building near Government Hill built in the late 19th century. It was demolished to make way for the French Mission Building of 1917 (at one time also owned by Mr Belilios).

== Second generation building ==
The building was constructed in a utilitarian style of the 1960s, and consisted of 6 storeys.

The lower floors were occupied by the Royal Hong Kong Regiment, which had its officers' and NCOs' mess in the building. The building thus housed three service messes, a post office and, dominating the ground floor façade, a large public toilet. The Information Services Department moved its offices from the west wing of the Government Offices to Beaconsfield House.

The ISD and its 100 staff had moved into the two uppermost floors. The space was configured into a news room, press conference room, Chinese translators' office, teleprinter service, photographic studio and darkroom, art studio, editorial section, film unit and two theatres for the censorship of commercial feature films. A publications distribution office, administrative office and various secretarial desks also shared the space.

The messes served relatively cheap meals and were open to the public.

=== Access ===
The building could be accessed from Queen's Road by a single lift. The building had another pedestrian entrance at the fourth storey linked to Battery Path by a small bridge, at the level of the French Mission Building.

== Redevelopment ==
In May 1994, there was criticism when it was revealed that the government entered into discussions with Li Ka-shing's Cheung Kong Holdings for the private sale of the site, along with the adjacent 33,700 sq ft (3,130 m^{2}) Government car park site. Talks had commenced in May 1993, and were finalised in August 1995 In April 1995, Executive Council has approved the sale of the site, for a sum estimated to be in excess of HK$5.5 billion.

In September 1995, the planning authorities passed the redevelopment proposals for the 9,900 m^{2} combined site. With a plot ratio of 15, 1,600,000 sq ft (150,000 m^{2}) building (including car park) would be built. The developer, Cheung Kong Holdings, reached an agreement with the planners that most of the building (the current Cheung Kong Center) would actually go on the Hilton site; much of the car park and Beaconsfield House area would be given over to park and public amenities.

== See also ==
- List of lost buildings and structures in Hong Kong
