= Occupy Central =

Occupy Central (Chinese: 佔領中環) may refer to:

- Occupy Central (2011–12)
- Occupy Central with Love and Peace
- The 2014 Hong Kong protests
- The Umbrella Movement, a related political movement in Hong Kong
