= Cheung Kong Center =

Skyscraper in Central, Hong Kong

- 長江集團中心
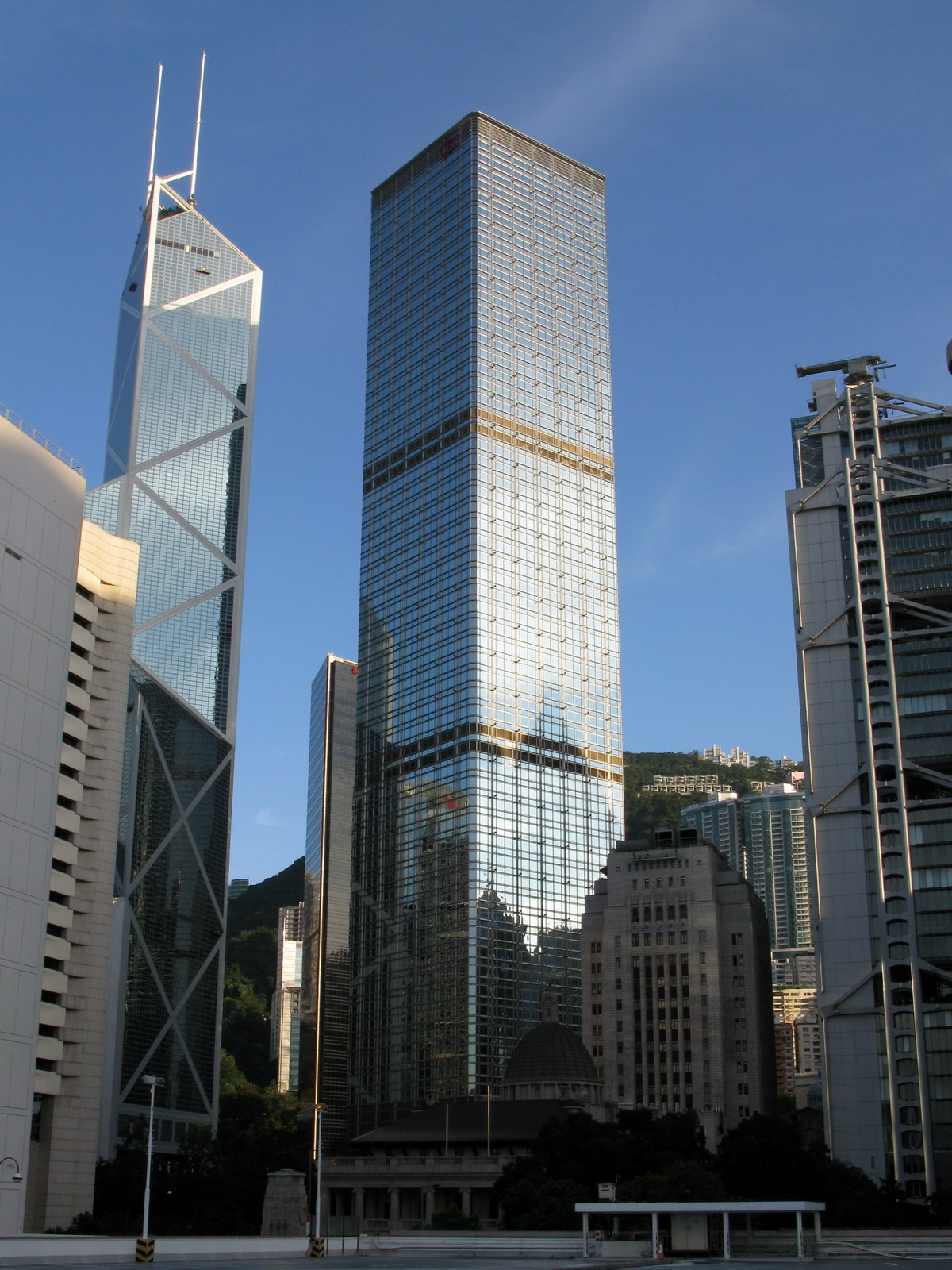
- The Bank of China Tower (left) and the Cheung Kong Center (right)

General information
- Status: Completed
- Type: Office
- Location: 2 Queen's Road Central, Central, Hong Kong
- Coordinates: 22°16′46″N 114°09′37″E
- Opening: 1999; 27 years ago
- Owner: CK Hutchison Holdings

Height
- Architectural: 282.8 m (928 ft)

Technical details
- Floor count: 63
- Floor area: 1,349,988 sq ft (125,418.0 m^{2})
- Lifts/elevators: 30

Design and construction
- Architects: Leo A Daly, Cesar Pelli
- Structural engineer: Arup

Cheung Kong Center
- Traditional Chinese: 長江集團中心
- Simplified Chinese: 长江集团中心
Transcriptions
Standard Mandarin
- Hanyu Pinyin: Cháng Jiāng Jítuán Zhōngxīn
Yue: Cantonese
- Yale Romanization: Chèuhng gōng jaahp tyùhn jūng sām
- Jyutping: Coeng4 gong1 zaap6 tyun4 zung1 sam1

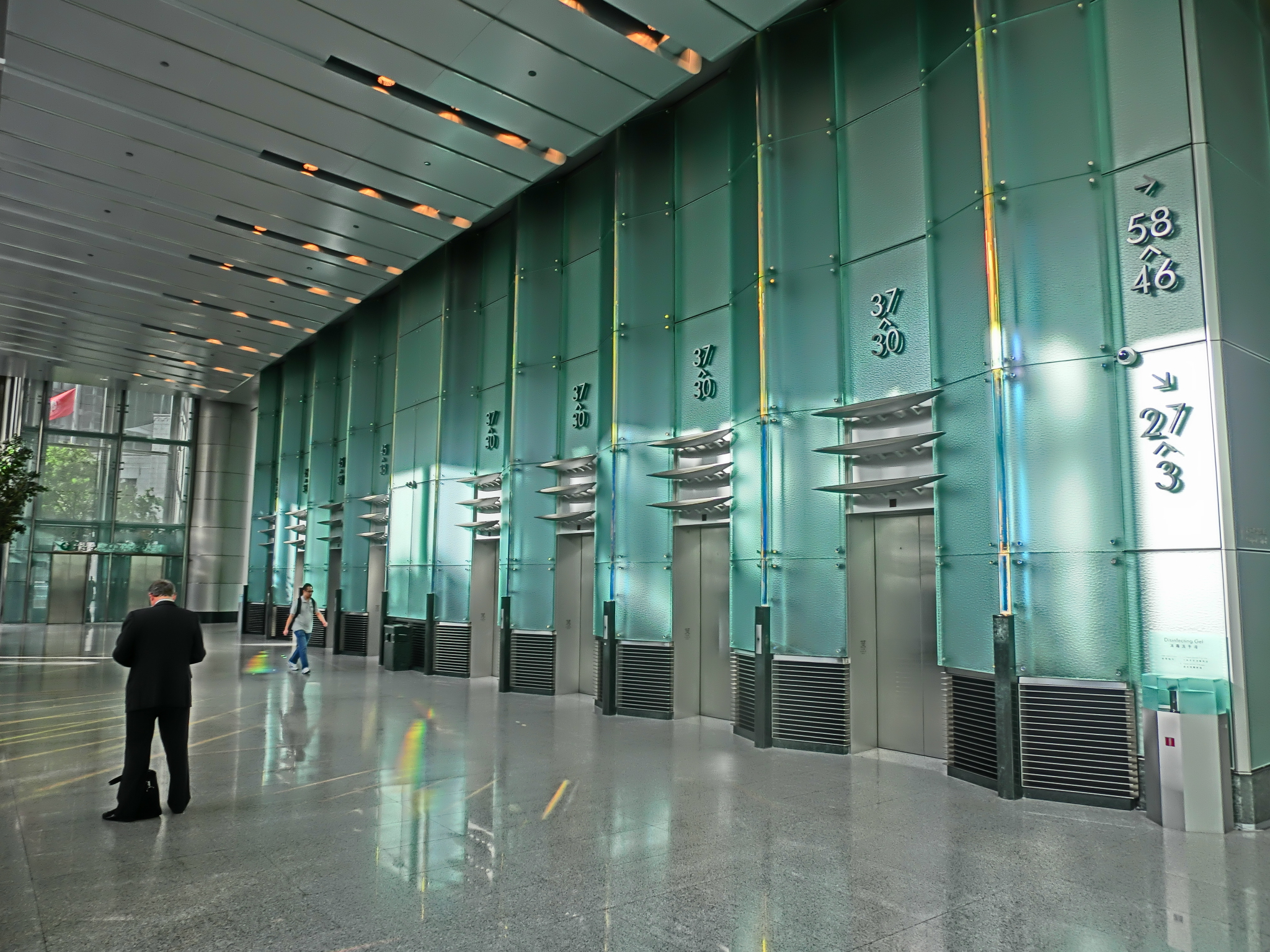
Cheung Kong Center Office Lobby

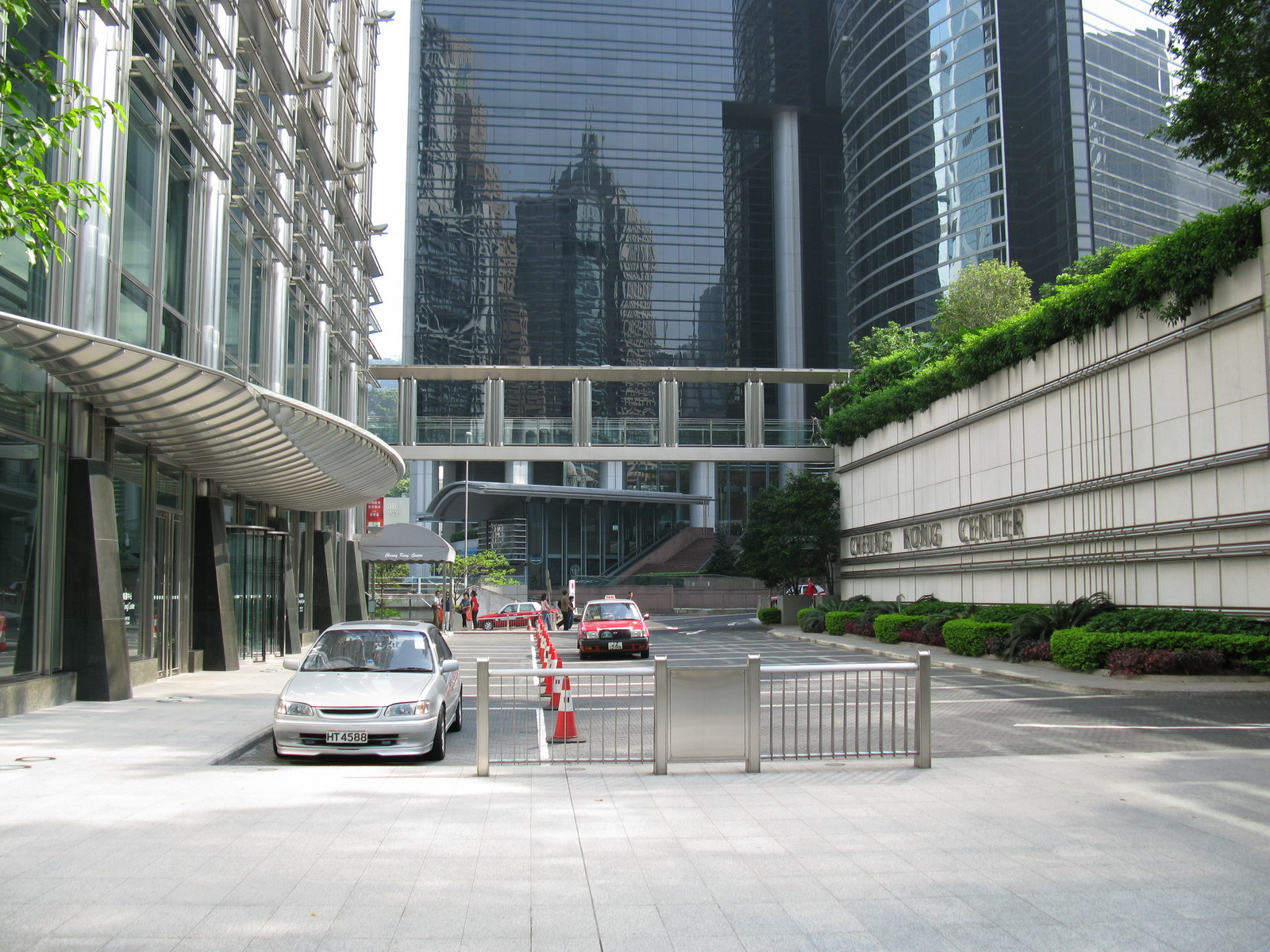
Cheung Kong Center Car Entrance

Cheung Kong Center is a skyscraper in Central, Hong Kong designed by Cesar Pelli. The 70-storey structure is 283 m (928 ft) tall with a gross floor area of 1,260,000-square-foot (117,100 m^{2}). When completed in 1999, it was the fourth-tallest building in the city after the Central Plaza, Bank of China Tower and The Center. The Cheung Kong Center sits on the combined sites of the former Hong Kong Hilton, which was demolished in 1995/6, Beaconsfield House, sold by the Government in 1996, and Garden Road Multi-storey Car Park Building, which was demolished in 1998/10. It stands between the HSBC Hong Kong headquarters building and the Bank of China Tower.

The building is the headquarters of Cheung Kong Holdings (CHL), and is owned and managed by its 49%-owned associated company Hutchison Whampoa (HW), which later merged in June 2015 as CK Hutchison Holdings; while other tenants include several multinational banking firms. As is common in Hong Kong, coloured lights on the sides of the building illuminate at night in intricate light shows.

== Site background ==
The 26-storey Hilton Hotel building and its site, Inland Lot 7702, was owned by a wholly owned subsidiary of HW, which licensed Hilton Hotels Group to operate it for 50 years. In January 1994, with about 20 years of the management contract to run, HW announced the buyout of the unexpired term for US$125 million.

HW had originally planned to redevelop the Hilton site into a high-rise office-retail complex, yielding a gross floor area of 584,970-square-foot (54,300 m^{2}). HW was keen to enlarge the redevelopment project by merging the hotel site with a neighbouring site to gain a greater efficiency, and commenced private talks with the Government in May 1993 with a view to acquiring the adjacent 33,700-square-foot (3,100 m^{2}) car park site, and the 18,300-square-foot (1,700 m^{2}) Beaconsfield House site from the Government. Talks were finalised in August 1995.

The Executive Council approved in principle the sale of the sites in April 1995.

In September 1995, the Urban Planning Committee of the Town Planning Board passed the proposals for the 9,900 m^{2} combined site. With a plot ratio of 15, 1,600,000 sq ft (150,000 m^{2}) building (including the 1000-space car park) could be built. The developer agreed with the planners that most of the building would actually be weighted on the Hilton site, so much of the car park and Beaconsfield house area would be given over to park and public amenities.

On 28 May 1996, Director of Lands Bob Pope disclosed that the land premium for developing the combined site was HK$3.02bn (South China Morning Post, 29 May 1996). The 1996 annual report of HW reflects the new lease of Inland Lot 8887, with a site area of approximately 103,937 sq ft. The gross floor area of the building is recorded as 1,254,158 sq ft in the 2002 annual report and 1,263,363 sq ft in the 2003 and subsequent annual reports.

== Building design ==
The building was designed by architects Cesar Pelli and Leo A. Daly, and is considered as much a work of art as an efficient working environment.

Cheung Kong Center was one of the few taller buildings in the Hong Kong Island skyline to follow a conventional design, like an American black office block, in contrast to the cacophony of architectural styles in the vicinity of Queen's Road. Instead of stealing the limelight, most notably from the Bank of China Tower, Cheung Kong Center was designed instead "to balance out its more creative neighbouring skyscrapers". A feng shui master was consulted on ways to absorb the negative energy coming from the Bank of China's sharp edges or "cleaver". The Cheung Kong Center 's maximum height was determined by drawing an imaginary line from the Bank of China Tower to the HSBC Headquarters, so it falls just short of the "supertall" skyscraper distinction (300 meters or higher).

The Cheung Kong Center's external walls are uniform glass panels each measuring 2.4 m x 2.1 m, giving occupants a 360-degree panoramic view over the entire city. The same panels are impregnated with an array of optical fibre which can be illuminated at night to display different messages according to the season. The black curtain wall gives the building an appearance of a silhouette in the daytime and an inky peaceful void at night, so it is noted for its sparkling illumination as the sky gets dark.

Its large floor plates range from 20,000 sq ft (1,900 m^{2}) to 22,000 sq ft (2,000 m^{2}). Tenants can customise an entire office plan at very little expense, as there are no obstructing columns on the floor plan. Offices are all designed with the advanced raised floor system through which air-conditioning and an advanced fibre-optic network accessible to all tenants is ducted.

It boasts the region's fastest elevators, made by Mitsubishi Electric, maxing out at 9 metres per second. Each elevator features giant plasma displays at the top of each cabin, showing Bloomberg TV.

== Tenants ==
The top floor is used by the Chairman of CKH and HW, Li Ka-shing, as his office. It also contains a private swimming pool and garden. Li is often seen escorted and takes a freight elevator operated in attendant mode so that it does not stop on any other floor.

Other tenants of the building include Allianz, Bank of America Merrill Lynch, Barclays Capital, BlackRock, Bloomberg, Goldman Sachs, Jefferies, KKR, McKinsey & Company, PricewaterhouseCoopers, Royal Bank of Canada, Royal Bank of Scotland, Och-Ziff Capital Management and the Securities and Futures Commission.

Goldman Sachs (Asia) is reported to have signed a 12-year lease on eight-and-a-half office floors, becoming the leading tenant. Hutchison is believed to have offered up to two-and-a-half years rent-free period.

== See also ==
- Cheung Kong Park
- List of tallest buildings in Hong Kong
- List of tallest freestanding steel structures
