= Dent's Fountain =

- 顛地噴泉 (Yue Chinese)
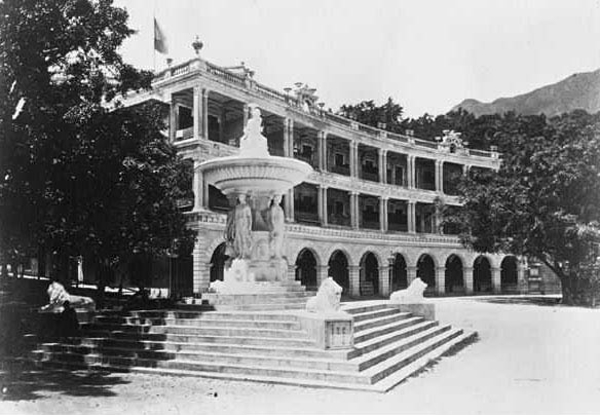
- Dent's Fountain, view from the City Hall, with Queen's Road Central and Beaconsfield House in the background
- Year: 1864
- Type: Public fountain
- Medium: Stucco, stone
- Condition: Demolished
- Location: Victoria, Hong Kong; 22°16′48″N 114°9′34″E

Dent's Fountain, also known as the City Hall Fountain, was a fountain in front of the first generation of Hong Kong City Hall (1869 -1933) on Queen's Road Central in Victoria, Hong Kong. It was donated to the people of Hong Kong by merchant John Dent of Dent & Co. in 1864 but was not installed until the completion of the City Hall in 1869. It was demolished along with the first generation City Hall in 1933 due to construction of the third generation Hongkong and Shanghai Banking Corporation Building.

== Design ==
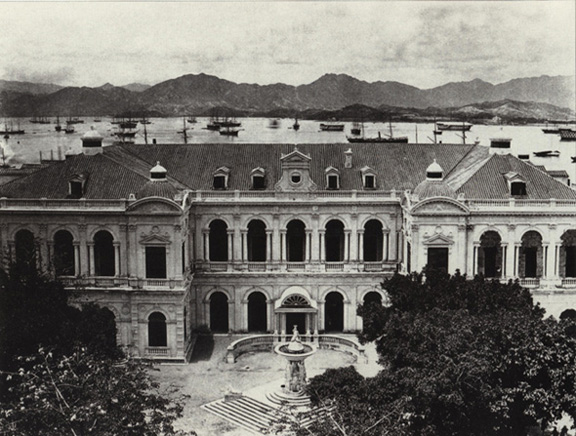
Hong Kong City Hall, with Dent's Fountain at the middle, Victoria Harbour in the background.

The fountain was located at the centre of the public space in front of the Old City Hall on Queen's Road Central, it served as the architectural focal point of the symmetrical facade of the City Hall.

The fountain was built with stucco, the centre had 4 caryatids supporting a basin, on the top of the basin there was a kneeling figure of a child. On the parameter, the fountain area was guarded by 4 couchant stone lions at 4 corners, each facing to the principal points of the compass. A plaques bore an inscription that the fountain was "presented to the Colony by Mr. John Dent in 1864".

== See also ==
- List of lost buildings and structures in Hong Kong
