= Cheung Kong Park =

Park in Hong Kong

Coordinates: 22.27902°N 114.16021°E

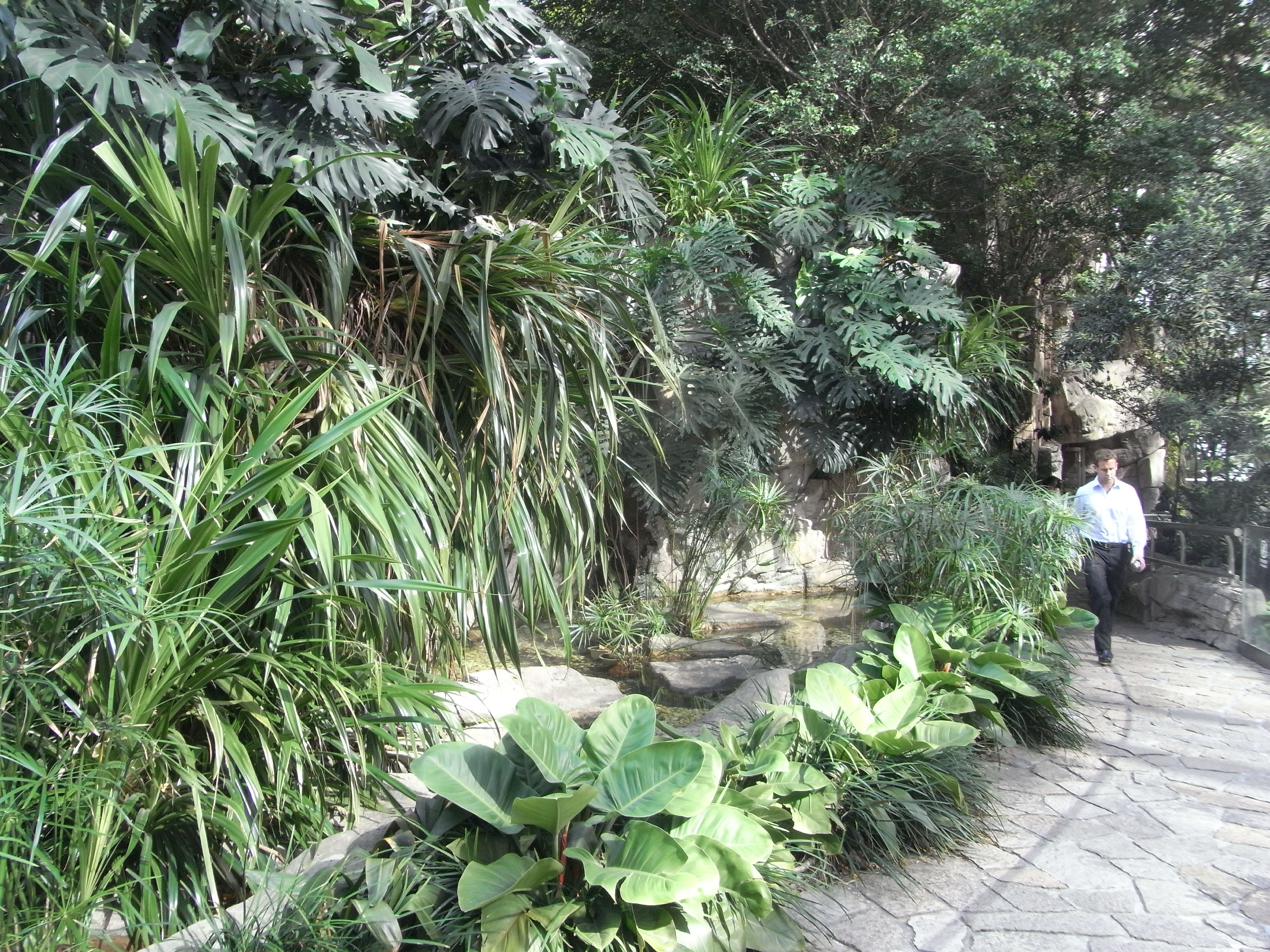
The park in 2010

Cheung Kong Park (Chinese: 長江公園) is a small garden located in the Central district of Hong Kong Island and named for Li Ka Shing's corporate empire. The park is privately maintained by Cheung Kong Holdings, but is open to the public. The park consists of ponds and cascades with benches for visitors.

== See also ==
- List of urban public parks and gardens in Hong Kong
- Cheung Kong Center
