= Old City Hall (Hong Kong) =

Structure in Hong Kong used solely for community purposes

- 舊香港大會堂
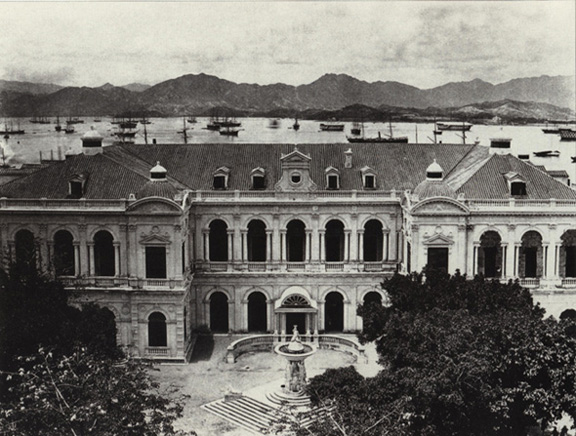
- The 1869 City Hall, southern aspect, with Dent's Fountain at the middle.

General information
- Location: Hong Kong
- Groundbreaking: 1866
- Opened: 28 June 1869
- Inaugurated: 2 November 1869
- Closed: 1933
- Demolished: 1947
- Owner: Hong Kong Government

Height
- Architectural: Renaissance

Technical details
- Floor count: 2

Design and construction
- Architect: Achille-Antoine Hermitte

Old City Hall
- Traditional Chinese: 舊香港大會堂
Transcriptions
Yue: Cantonese
- Yale Romanization: Gauh hēung góng daaih wuih tòhng
- Jyutping: Gau6 hoeng1 gong2 daai6 wui6 tong4

Old City Hall, which existed from 1869 to 1933, was the first public multipurpose performance facility and cultural venue in the crown colony of Hong Kong. It housed a theatre, a library, a museum and assembly rooms. Despite its name, its function differed from a town hall in that it was used solely for community purposes and did not house any government offices.

Located on Queen's Road Central in Victoria, Hong Kong, it occupied the current sites of the HSBC Hong Kong headquarters building (partly) and the Bank of China Building. It was designed by the French architect Achille-Antoine Hermitte and was opened by Prince Alfred, Duke of Edinburgh, in a ceremony on 28 June 1869.

== Design and function ==
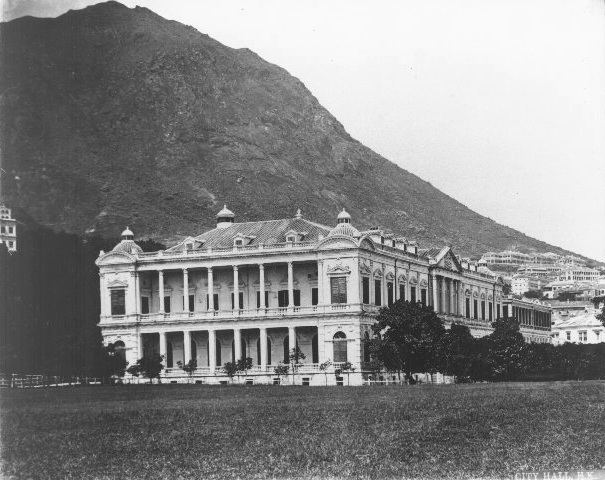
City Hall c.1875, oblique view of eastern façade

The City Hall was built on Crown land, and funds were raised for its construction, which started in 1866, from public subscriptions. The two-storey hall was designed by M^{e} French architect Achille-Antoine Hermitte in a Renaissance style, with cupolae, colonnades and arches. The facilities available for use by the local community included a theatre, library, museum and assembly rooms. A fountain - Dent's Fountain, sponsored by Dent & Co., was installed at the front (south side) of the Hall. The building was inaugurated by HRH Prince Alfred, Duke of Edinburgh on 2 November 1869 on his visit to the colony.

The land was acquired by the Hong Kong Bank in 1933 for its third generation headquarters, so that the western part of City Hall was pulled down. The remaining part was demolished in 1947 to make way for the Bank of China Building.

== Theatre ==
The Hall housed the Theatre Royal, a 569 seats performance space which hosted a number of amateur and professional theatre performances for residents of the colony. The theatre was renovated in 1903 to improve the function and acoustics.

== See also ==
- Dent's Fountain, also known as City Hall Fountain
- Hong Kong City Hall
- The Hongkong and Shanghai Banking Corporation
