= Minibar =

Small fridge

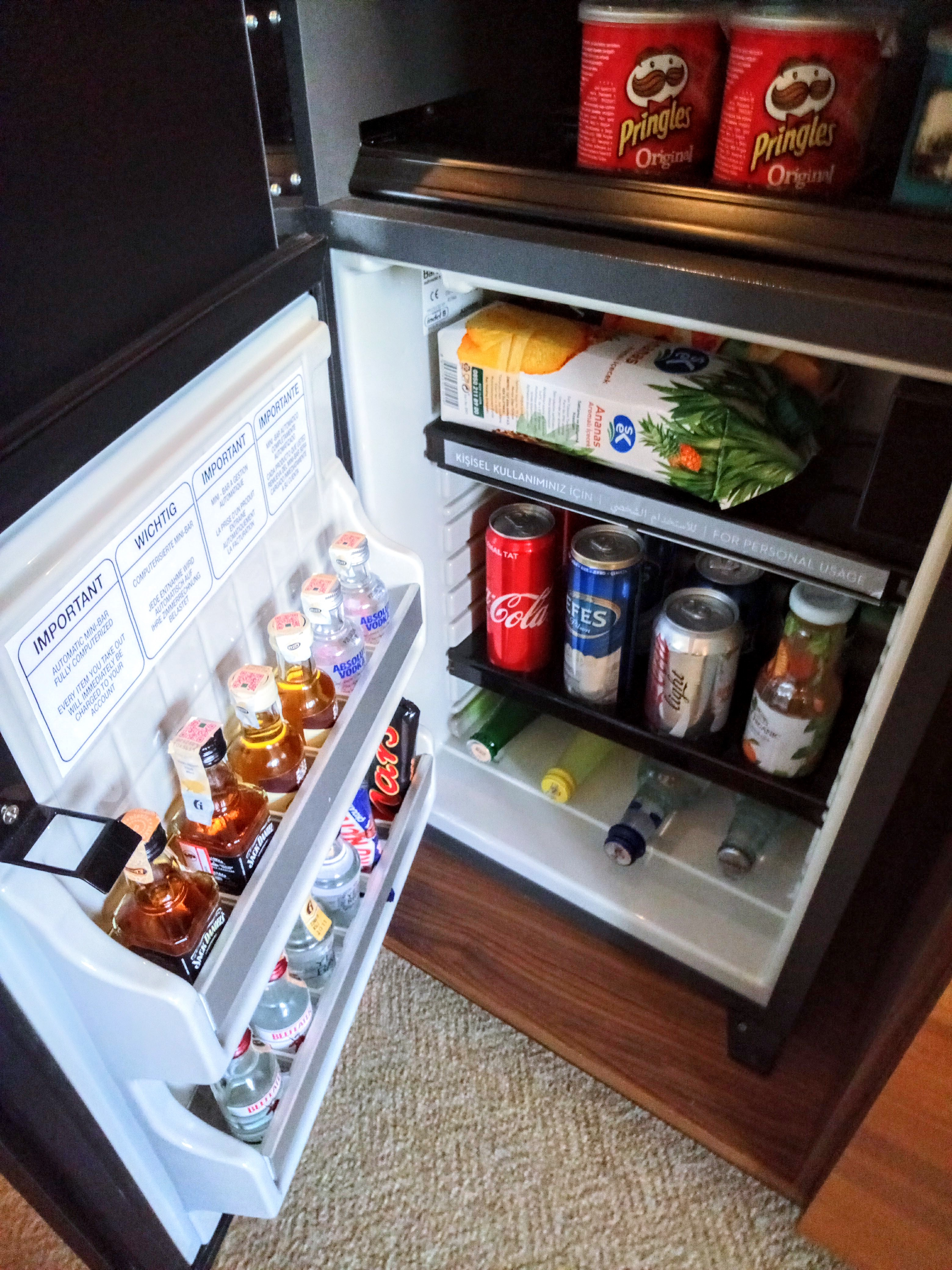
A refrigerated minibar in a Grand Hyatt hotel, filled with beverages. This minibar detects whenever an item is removed and charges the guest instantly, even if the item is not consumed.

A minibar is a small refrigerator, typically an absorption refrigerator, in a hotel room or cruise ship stateroom. The hotel staff fill it with drinks and snacks for the guest to purchase during their stay. It is stocked with a precise inventory of goods, with a price list. The guest is charged for goods consumed when checking out of the hotel. Some newer minibars use infrared or other automated methods of recording purchases. These detect the removal of an item and charge the guest's credit card right away, even if the item is not consumed. This is done to prevent loss of product, theft and lost revenue.

The minibar is commonly stocked with small bottles and cans of alcoholic beverages, juice, bottled water, and soft drinks. There may also be candy, cookies, crackers, and other small snacks. Prices are generally very high compared to similar items purchased from a store, because the guest is paying for the convenience of immediate access and also the upkeep of the bar. Prices vary, but a common price for a can of a non-alcoholic beverage is US$6–10. Due to the convenience of room service and the minibar, prices charged to the patron are much higher than the hotel's restaurant or tuck shop. As premium bottled water has become popular with guests since the 2000s, there is "ambient placement" of such chargeable products outside the minibar and in the guests' line of vision; for example "by placing [bottled] water on bedside tables, during the night, people are more likely to grab it than get up to get a glass of water".

The world's first minibar was introduced at the Hong Kong Hilton Hotel by manager Robert Arnold in 1974. In the months following its introduction in-room drink sales increased 500%, and the Hong Kong Hilton's overall annual revenue was boosted by 5%. The following year the Hilton group rolled out the minibar concept across all its hotels.

In recent years, as minibars become less and less popular with guests, hotels have been eliminating this feature from their rooms. It takes staff considerable time to re-stock the traditional mini-bar inventory and monitor its use precisely, and such manual work is prone to human error. In recent years cunning guests have managed to game the traditional minibar system, such as replacing or emptying the contents of items (also known as "shrinkage"), consuming items before immediately lodging a complaint to switch hotel rooms, and disputing the minibar charges at check-out time. Some newer minibars use infrared or other automated methods of recording purchases, detecting the removal of an item and automatically charging the guest's credit card right away, even if the item is not consumed. A hotel may also charge a "personal use" fee if the guest uses the minibar to store their own items.

== From absorption cooling unit to compressor ==
Typically the minibar cooling unit was different from standard refrigerators, using absorption technology. An Italian company was the first manufacturer to install a compressor mini-refrigerator in the NASA Space Shuttle in 1982. A compressor refrigeration unit, in addition to a timer and a eutectic plate, allow saving more energy, compared to a traditional absorption minibar.
