= Occupy Central (2011–2012) =

Occupation protest in Central, Hong Kong

Coordinates: 22.28°N 114.159444°E

Occupy Central (2011-2012)
- Part of the Occupy movement
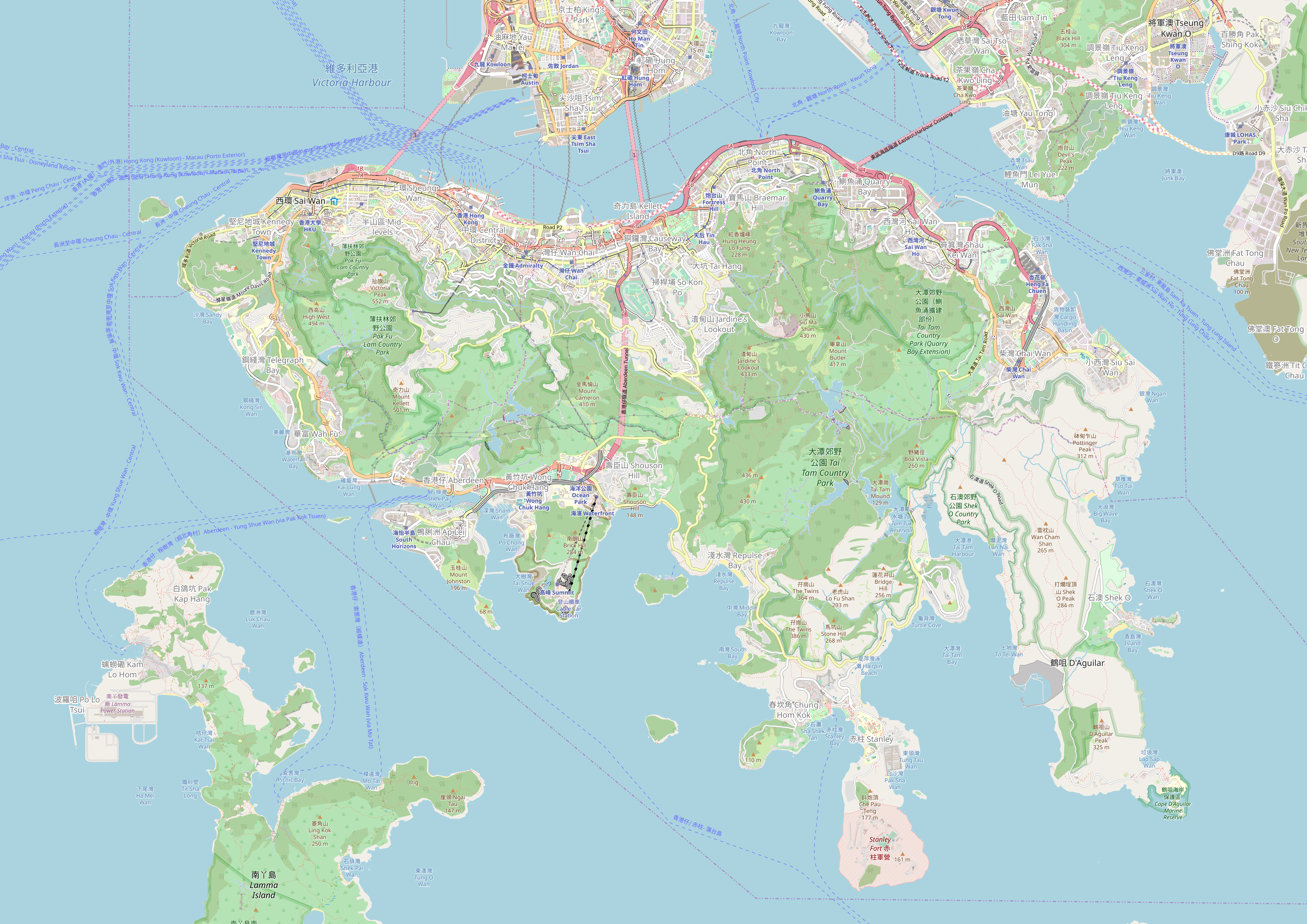
- Occupy Central location within Hong Kong Island
- Date: From 15 October 2011 to 11 September 2012 (10 months)
- Location: Central, Hong Kong
- Caused by: Economic inequality, corporate influence over government, inter alia.
- Methods: Demonstration, occupation
- Status: Ended
- Result: Cleared by court bailiffs

Number
- 200–300 at its peak

Arrests and injuries
- Injuries: at least 2
- Arrested: 3

Occupy Central was an occupation protest that took place in Central, Hong Kong from 15 October 2011 to 11 September 2012. The camp was set up at a plaza beneath the HSBC headquarters. On 13 August 2012, the High Court granted an injunction against the continuation of the protest, and ordered the occupants to leave by 9 pm on 27 August. But protesters defied the order and remained in place until 15 days after the deadline, when court bailiffs were sent to evict the occupants. Ending on 11 September, the movement remains one of the lengthiest Occupy movements in the world.

The Occupy movement is an international protest movement against social and economic inequality. Its primary goal is to make society's economic structure and power relations more fair. Each local group has its own focus, but among the primary concerns are the claims that large corporations and the global financial system control the world in a way that disproportionately benefits a minority, undermines democracy, and is unstable.

== Initiation ==
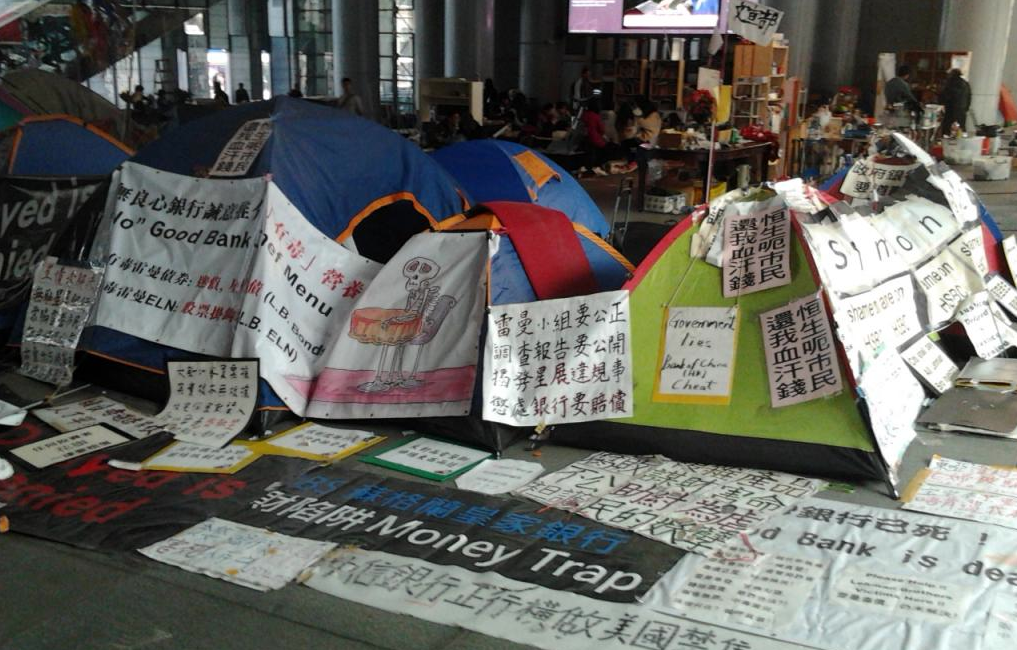
A view of the camp at the plaza.

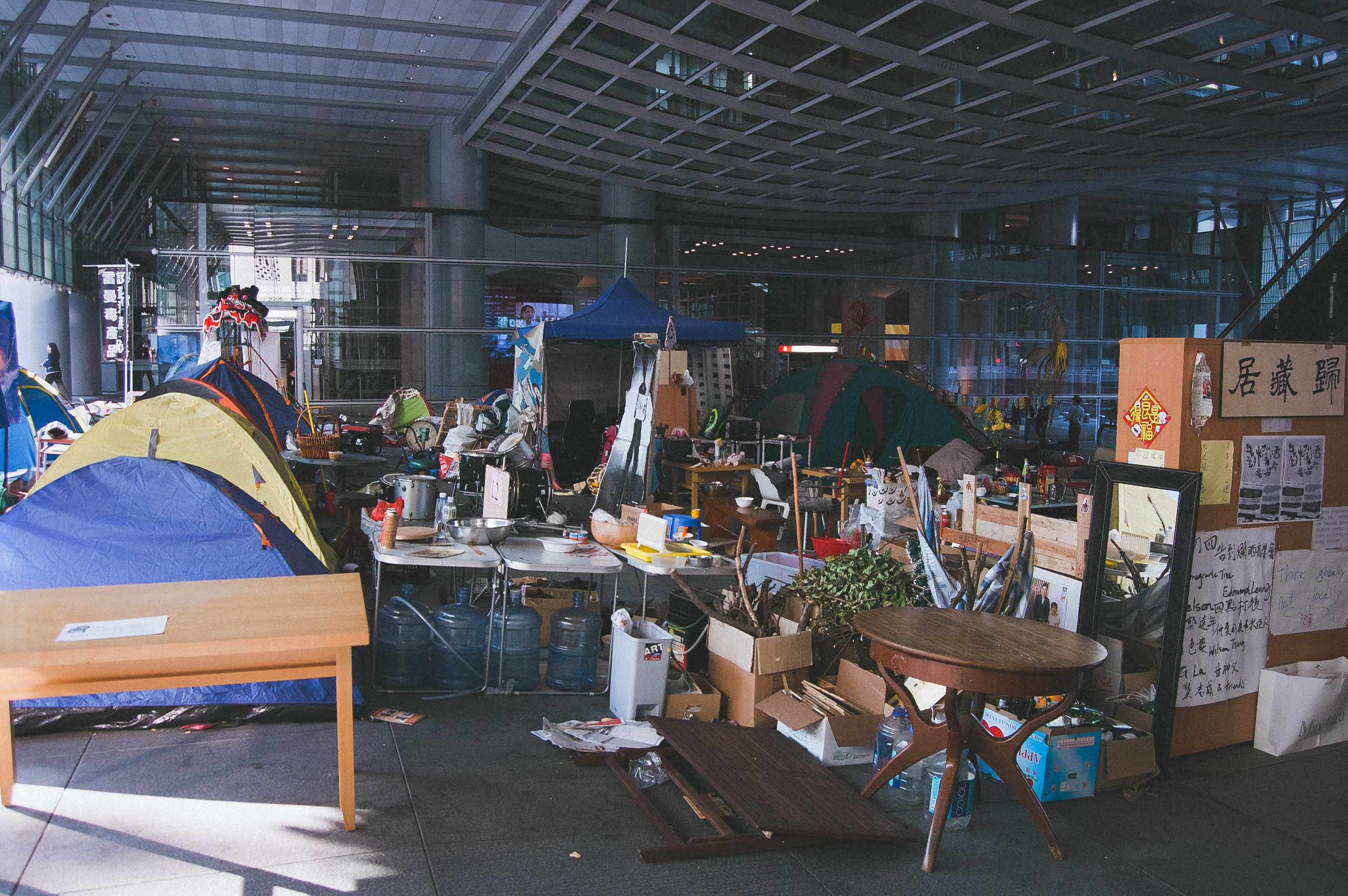
Occupy Central Camp

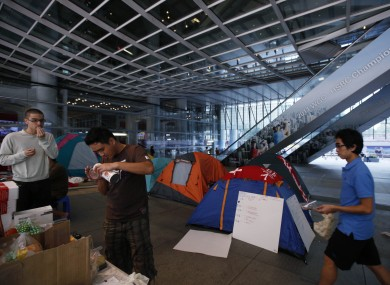
Occupants tried to create an 'equal' community.

Echoing the global Occupy movement against corporate greed and economic inequality, the 'Occupy Central' campaign of Hong Kong started on 15 October 2011, with protestors tenanting the plaza beneath the HSBC headquarters in Central, an iconic landmark of the territory's central business district. The plaza is the bank's property, but was deeded during construction in 1983 as an area dedicated to serve as a public pedestrian passage. The Hong Kong encampment, aiming at creating an ideal community advocating "equality", attracted a commune of occupiers including students, young professionals, activists, the unemployed and homeless. As at 11 December 2011 and August 2012, there were around 20 and 10 campers respectively, but more than 200 participants engaged in the campaign at its height.

== High Court injunction ==
The campaign carried on for 10 months non-stop. In June 2012, HSBC brought the case to the High Court after previous requests for the activists to leave voluntarily were ignored. On 13 August 2012, the court granted an injunction and ruled that protesters must clear out the occupied area within 14 days, that is by 9 pm on 27 August 2012. Mr Justice Reuder Lai stated that the activists' use of the space went beyond its role as a public passageway, and there was no legal basis for them to continue occupying the area. Following the hearing, a number of protesters said they would not contest the ruling and would continue their protest in other public areas. However, some defiantly declared 'We'll never leave! In your dreams'. One of the organisers, surnamed Wong, told the press that the plaza was so big that their campaign did not stop members of the public from passing through. Although there was some public support for the protesters at the height of the worldwide Occupy movement, critics said the campaigners had overstayed their welcome, and believed it was time to move on. Legal professionals warned that the action of defying the court's order might be declared contempt of court, for which offenders can be sentenced to a fine at level 3 and to imprisonment for six months. Still, the protesters argued that the space was public, and that they had the right to use it freely.

== Deadline ==
On 27 August 2012, defiant protesters ignored the Court's order for them to leave the HSBC headquarters. In the evening, protesters held a concert while chanting slogans "Do not leave even if we will die" and vowing to continue their 10-month movement. One supporter burned joss paper and plastic shoes at the scene, attracting around 20 policemen and firemen who arrived to conduct a check. Some of the about 40 activists pledged to stay overnight even after security guards put up a board outside the building at 10pm, one hour after the clearance deadline, notifying the protesters of the High Court's prohibition order. The spokesman of HSBC announced that if the protesters did not clear out, the bank would request the court to assign bailiffs to carry out the eviction order.

== Clearance ==
On 11 September 2012, 15 days after the eviction deadline imposed by the court, court bailiffs removed the remaining campers from the HSBC plaza. The bailiffs arrived in the morning to administer their task but faced tough resistance, thus prolonging the clearance to almost eight hours. They first removed furniture and tents of the occupants in the area. In the meantime, campers confronted the officials, claiming that they did not show the court's order of clearance before their action. The bailiffs, however, ignored the complaints and continued the clearance operation. The number of protestors increased from five to a few dozen. As protestors outside the plaza forced their way into the building, scuffles broke out between them and security guards. A few guards were injured and were sent to hospital. Some occupiers zipped themselves in tents, trying to avoid being removed by the bailiffs. By 4pm, the last of the 11 campers was forcibly evicted from the ground. The plaza was sealed. (The gate to the plaza is not often closed, except during a typhoon strike.) Three people were arrested for assaulting security guards. However, the police did not otherwise interfere in the clearance.

== See also ==
- List of Occupy movement protest locations
