= Hong Kong Hilton =

Former hotel in Central, Hong Kong

Coordinates: 22.27978°N 114.16050°E

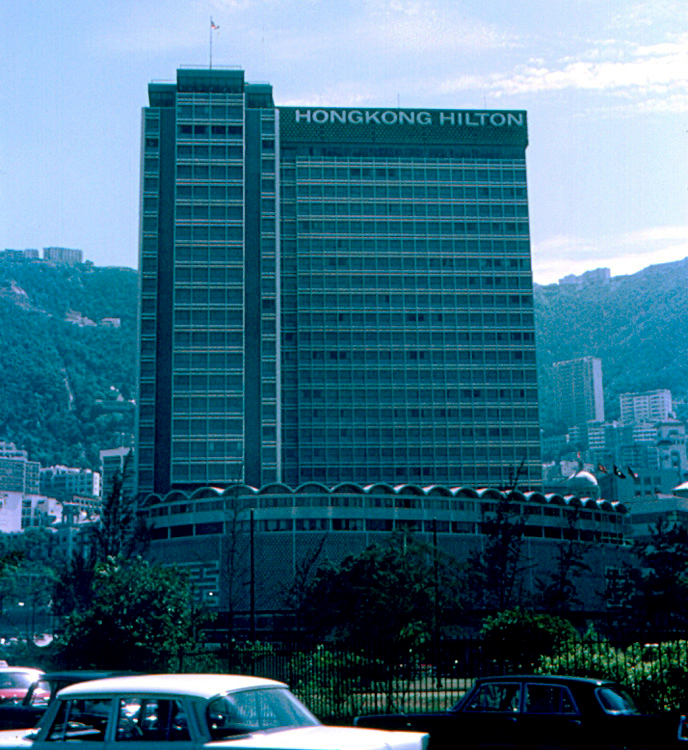
- Interactive map of the Hong Kong Hilton area

General information
- Location: 2 Queen's Road, Central, Hong Kong
- Opening: 1963
- Closed: May 1,1995; 30 years ago
- Owner: Hutchison Whampoa
- Management: Hilton Hotel Corporation

Technical details
- Floor count: 26

Design and construction
- Architecture firm: Palmer and Turner

Other information
- Number of rooms: 750
- demolished to make way for Cheung Kong Centre

Hong Kong Hilton was a hotel in Central, Hong Kong. Built in 1963, the 26-storey hotel was initially the only 5-star hotel on the island side of the territory. It closed in May 1995, and was demolished soon thereafter along with Beaconsfield House (the old address of the Information Service Department) in 1996, and Garden Road Multi-storey Car Park Building in October 1998, to make way for a commercial development, the Cheung Kong Centre.

== History ==
The 26-storey building was owned by Hutchison Whampoa, who licensed Hilton Hotels Group to operate it for 50 years. The 750-room hotel opened in 1963 and was one of the most prestigious in the colony, a favorite of tourists and dignitaries alike.

The Hong Kong Hilton was the first hotel in the world to introduce the minibar in all of its hotel rooms in 1974. In the months following its introduction in-room drink sales increased 500%, and the Hong Kong Hilton's overall annual revenue was boosted by 5%. This led the Hilton group to roll out the minibar concept across all its hotels the following year.

In January 1994, with about 20 years of the management contract to run, Hutchison announced the buyout of the remaining term for US$125 million. The hotel subsequently closed its doors on 1 May 1995, the landmark was to be torn down and rebuilt as a multi-storey commercial office complex and headquarters for Li Ka-shing's flagship holding company, Cheung Kong Holdings.

The Hong Kong Hilton had a staff of 850. Its employees were given an average of nine months' salary as part of their redundancy packages. Moreover, Hutchison also placed over 60% of its staff in the new Harbour Plaza Hotel in Hung Hom. Hilton Hotels still maintains a presence on Hong Kong Island, with the Conrad at Pacific Place in Admiralty.
