= Dent & Co. =

19th century company

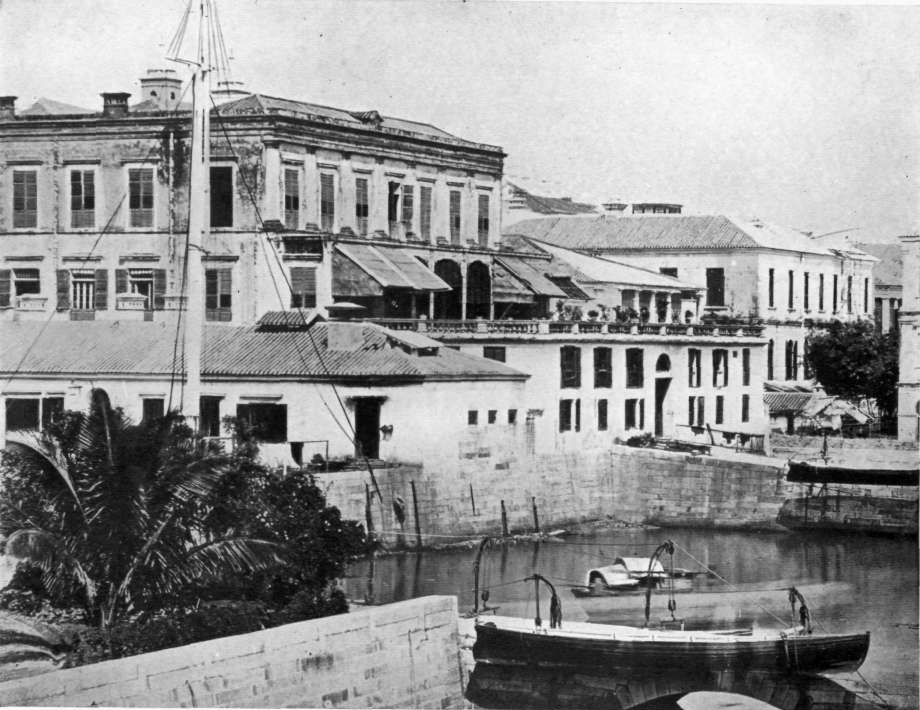
- Dent building, c. 1858
- Traditional Chinese: 寶順洋行
- Simplified Chinese: 宝顺洋行
Transcriptions
Standard Mandarin
- Hanyu Pinyin: Bǎoshùn Yángháng
Yue: Cantonese
- Jyutping: Bou2 seon6 Joeng4 hong4

Alternative Chinese name
- Traditional Chinese: 顛地洋行
- Simplified Chinese: 颠地洋行
Transcriptions
Standard Mandarin
- Hanyu Pinyin: Diānde Yángháng
Yue: Cantonese
- Jyutping: Din1 dei6 Joeng4 hong4

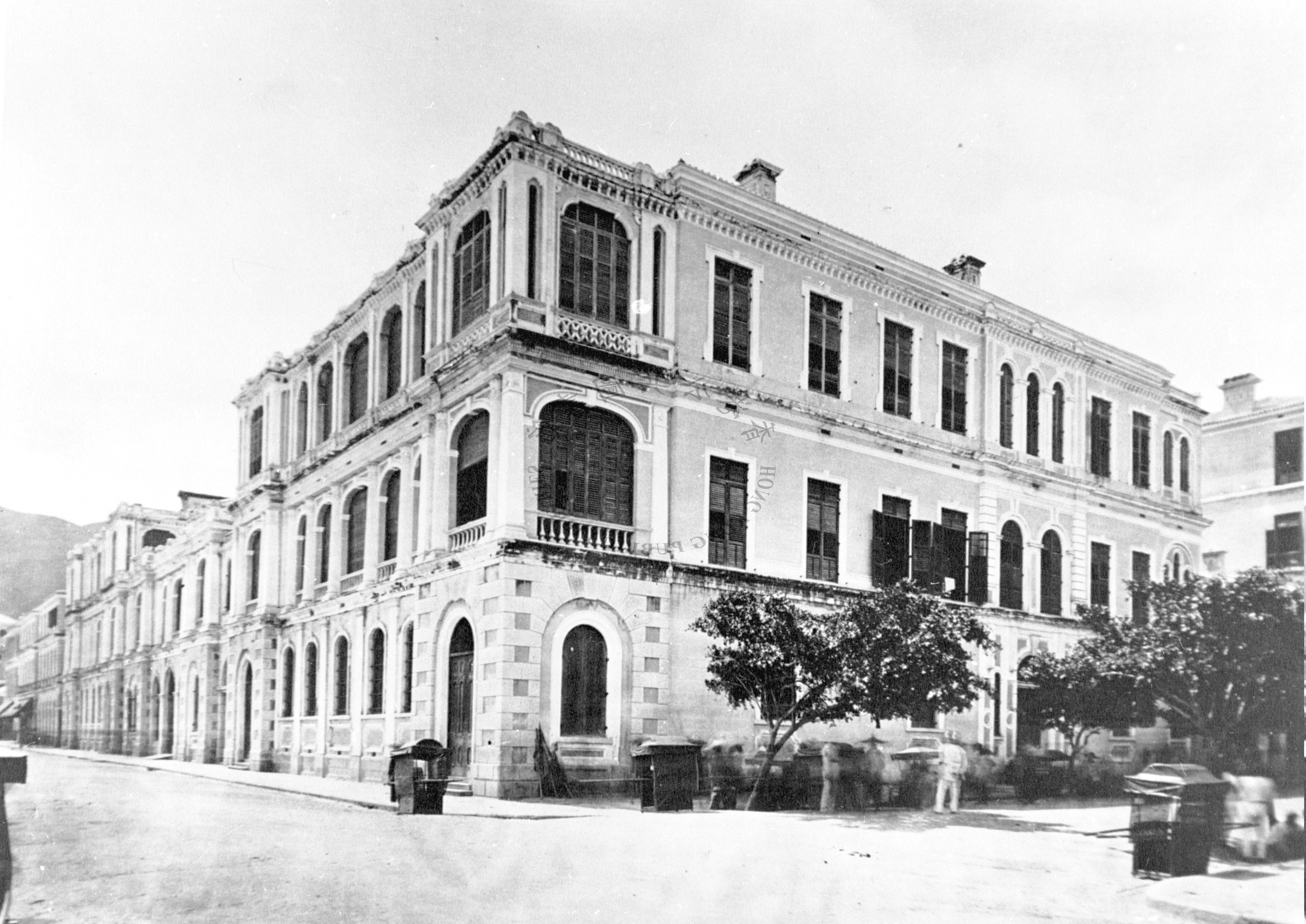
Dent Building in Central waterfront, c. 1869

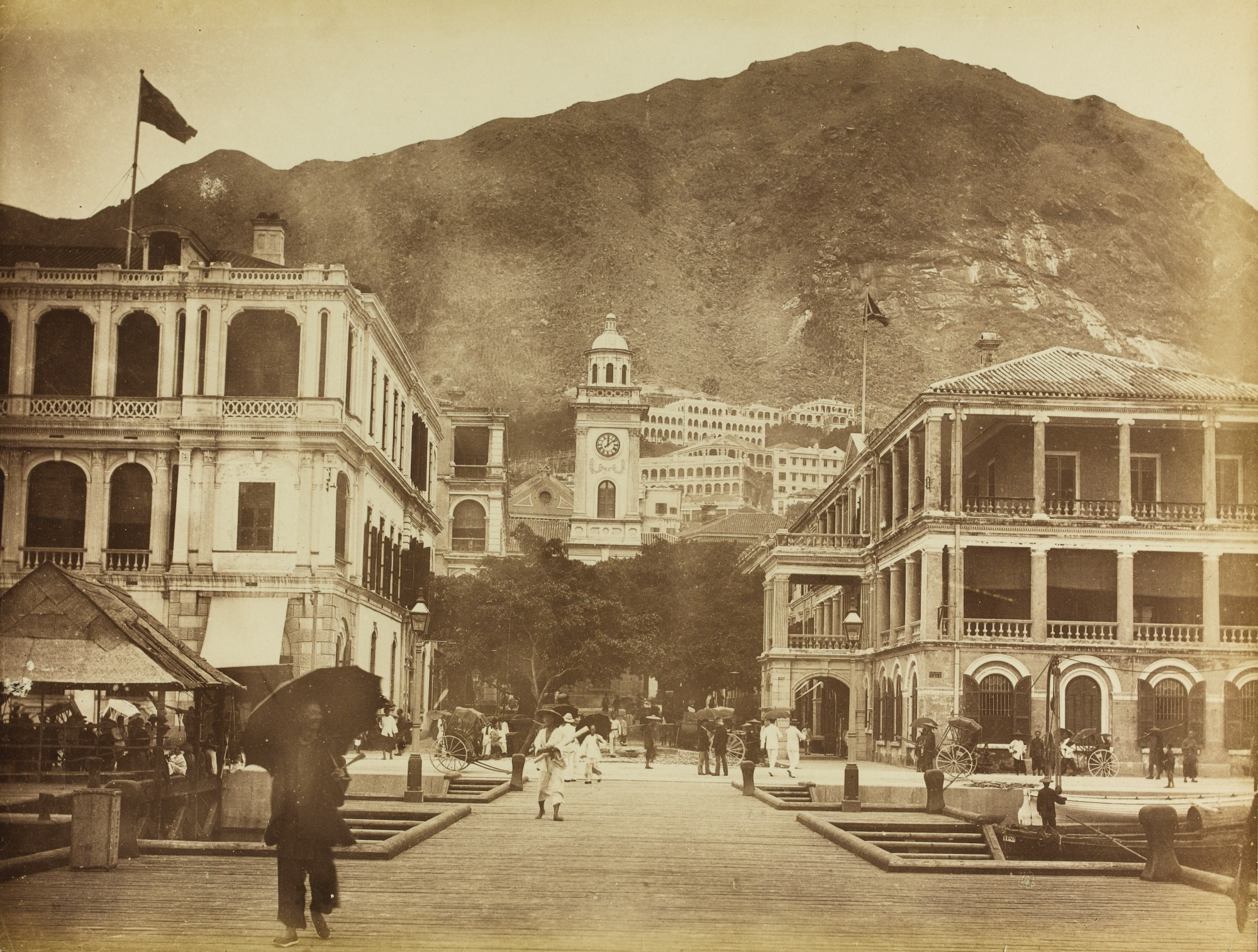
Dent Building (left) and the first generation Jardine House (right), with Pedder Street Clock Tower in the background. 1886 photograph by Lai Afong.

Dent & Co. or Dent's was one of the wealthiest British merchant firms, or hongs, active in China during the 19th century. A direct rival to Jardine, Matheson & Co, together with Russell & Co., these three companies are recognised as the original Canton hongs active in early colonial Hong Kong.

== History ==
=== Foundation ===
Former East India Company supercargo George Baring (1781–1854), son of Sir Francis Baring, 1st Baronet, of the eponymous banking family founded the firm later to become Dent & Co in 1809. After the firm ordered its supercargos to stop trading in opium, William Davidson joined the firm, becoming sole partner between 1813–1820. In that year, Thomas Dent (1796-1872) came on board and he in turn brought in Robert Hugh Inglis, who had connections with the East India Company, of which his father and uncle were both directors. A younger sibling of Thomas, Lancelot Dent, joined his brother in the firm in 1827.

Thomas Dent arrived in Canton in 1823 to join Davidson & Co as a partner. When Davidson left in 1824, the company changed its name to "Dent & Co.".

=== Trading history ===
Lancelot succeeded Thomas as the senior partner when his brother departed the company in 1831. Lin Zexu's warrant for the arrest of Lancelot Dent in 1839 to force him to hand over his store of opium was the opening shot of the First Opium War.

Thomas Chaye Beale joined the firm as a partner in 1845 whereupon it became Dent, Beale & Co. It once again became Dent & Co. upon Beale's departure in 1857.

In 1841 Dent moved its headquarters to Victoria, where it was one of the first companies in Hong Kong to purchase land in what was to become known as Central District. Dent was one of the first traders to open offices when Shanghai opened to foreign trade in 1843 following the First Opium War. The firm built offices there at 14, The Bund, and became involved in the international silk and tea trade, having divested their (now) criminal shares in Opium to their associates in Boston, Massachusetts, out of reach of the English Justice.

Dent's was one of the founding members of the provisional committee that launched The Hongkong and Shanghai Banking Corporation Limited in March 1865. Francis Chomley of Dent's chaired the first meeting, held on 6 August 1864. It also led the foundation of the Union Insurance Society of Canton in 1835.

=== Downfall ===
In 1866, the collapse of Overend, Gurney and Company, a discount house in Lombard Street, London, rocked the financial world. This failure caused a run on many banks which in turn brought down many other businesses and forced Dent's to shut its Hong Kong office in the wake of the affair. Jardine Matheson & Co averted disaster by learning the news sooner – its mail steamer carrying news from Calcutta arrived one hour earlier than others – and emptied its balances at a failing bank before anyone else had heard of the news in Hong Kong. Dent's officially folded in 1867. Its headquarters moved to Shanghai following the collapse in Hong Kong.

== Premises ==
Dent occupied a building on the corner of Pedder Street and Praya Central (the waterfront), where The Landmark complex is now situated. The first building was constructed in 1850, and was redeveloped in 1864.

After Dent collapsed, half of its land on Pedder Street was sold to the newly established Hongkong Hotel Company. The hotel was duly built, and became Hong Kong's first deluxe hotel. The remaining part of the west wing was let out to other trading firms. The hotel expanded northwards, and was later rebuilt into a 6-storey structure, completed in 1893, but the hotel burned down in 1926.

The site was acquired by Hongkong Land, and Gloucester Tower constructed in 1932. It was redeveloped into The Landmark in 1979.

== See also ==
- History of Hong Kong
- List of trading companies
