= HSBC Building (Hong Kong) =

Headquarters building of The Hongkong and Shanghai Banking Corporation

HSBC Main Building
- 香港上海滙豐銀行總行大廈
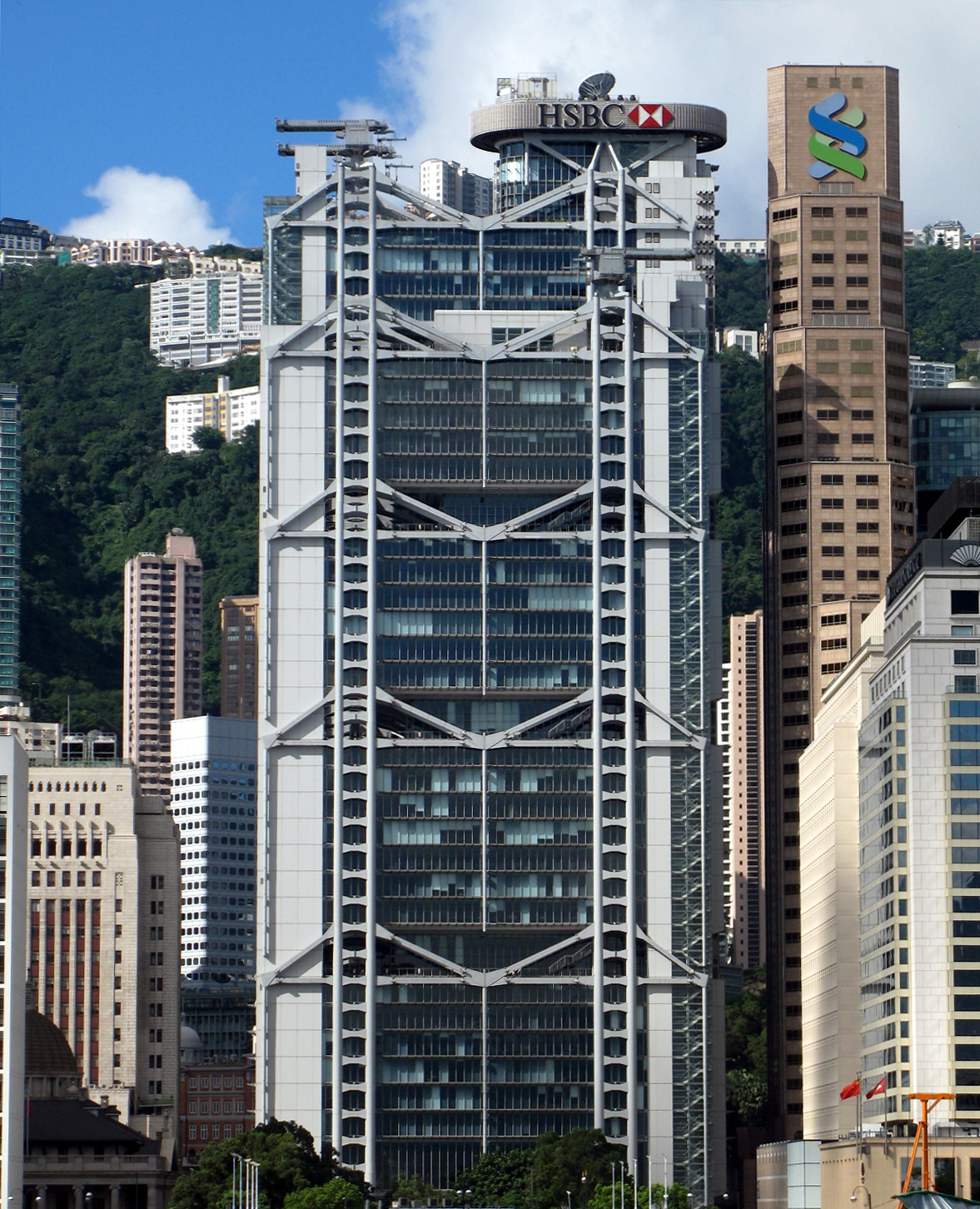
- HSBC Main Building in June 2008

- Location within Hong Kong

General information
- Status: Completed
- Type: Commercial offices
- Architectural style: Structural Expressionism
- Location: 1 Queen's Road Central, Central, Hong Kong
- Coordinates: 22°16′48″N 114°9′34″E
- Construction started: 1981; 45 years ago
- Completed: 18 November 1985; 40 years ago
- Cost: HK$5.2 billion

Height
- Roof: 178.8 m (586.6 ft)
- Top floor: 47

Technical details
- Floor count: 47
- Floor area: 99,000 m^{2} (1,065,627 sq ft)
- Lifts/elevators: 28

Design and construction
- Architect: Foster and Partners
- Structural engineer: Ove Arup & Partners; Cleveland Bridge & Engineering Company
- Quantity surveyor: Levett & Bailey / Northcroft, Neighbour & Nicholson
- Main contractor: John Lok / Wimpey Joint Venture

HSBC Building
- Traditional Chinese: 香港滙豐銀行大廈
- Simplified Chinese: 香港汇丰银行大厦
Transcriptions
Standard Mandarin
- Hanyu Pinyin: Xiānggǎng Huìfēng Yínháng Dàshà
Yue: Cantonese
- Yale Romanization: Héung góng wuih fúng ngán hàhn daaìh hàh
- Jyutping: Hoeng1 gong2 wui6 fung1 ngan2 han4 daai6 haa6
- IPA: [hœ́ŋkɔ̌ːi.wùːifʊ́ŋ.ŋɐ̌nhɐ̏n.tɐ̀ihàː]

HSBC Main Building is a headquarters building of The Hongkong and Shanghai Banking Corporation, which is today a wholly owned subsidiary of London-based HSBC Holdings. It is located on the southern side of Statue Square near the location of the old City Hall, Hong Kong (built in 1869, demolished in 1933). The previous HSBC building was built in 1935 and demolished to make way for the current building. The address remains as 1 Queen's Road Central (the north facing side of the building was served by Des Voeux Road Central, which was the seashore, making Queen's Road the main entrance, in contrast to the current primary access coming from Des Voeux Road).

== History ==
=== First building ===
The first HSBC (then known as the Hong Kong and Shanghai Banking Company Limited) building was Wardley House, used as an HSBC office between 1865 and 1882 on the present site. In 1864 the lease cost HKD 500 a month. After raising a capital of HKD 5 million, the bank opened its doors in 1865.

=== Second building ===
Wardley House was subsequently demolished and replaced by a second HSBC building that was completed in 1886. The main feature of the second building design was the division of the structure into two almost separate buildings. The building on Queen's Road Central was in Victorian style with a verandah, colonnades and an octagonal dome, whereas an arcade which harmonised with the adjacent buildings was constructed on Des Voeux Road. It was designed by Clement Palmer in 1883.

=== Third building ===
In 1934, the second building was demolished and a third design was erected. The new building opened in October 1935. Upon completion, the building stood as the tallest building in Hong Kong and "the largest building in the Far East", "the tallest structure in South East Asia", and "tallest building between Cairo and San Francisco". The third design used part of the land of the old City Hall, and was built in a mixed Art Deco and Stripped Classical style. During the Japanese occupation of Hong Kong between 1941 and 1945, the building served as the government headquarters. It was the first building in Asia to be fully air-conditioned. By the 1970s, the bank had outgrown its headquarters; departments were scattered into offices all over Central, and it was obvious that such a "solution" to the space limitations could not continue indefinitely. In 1978, the bank decided to replace it with a new building intended to symbolize the bank’s modernization and the city’s increasing prominence in global finance. Construction began in 1981 and concluded in 1985.

=== Current building ===
The current building is a steel suspended structure designed by Norman Foster, was completed on 18 November 1985. The building officially opened on 7 April 1986. At the time, it was the most expensive building in the world (c.a. HK$5.2 billion, roughly US$668 million). The decision to replace the previous headquarters marked the bank's goals for modernization and role in growth as a financial center.

The first major addition to the building, designed by Hong Kong's One Space Ltd, was completed on 23 November 2006, in the form of a ground floor lobby that improves security access to the upper floors and creates a prestigious reception area. Its design and construction included the installation of the "Asian Story Wall", a multimedia installation consisting of twin banks of 30 seamless plasma screens (the largest installation of its kind in Hong Kong) displaying archived bank heritage and artworks.

The atrium of the HSBC building was the site of the Occupy Hong Kong protests which maintained a presence in the building from 15 October 2011 until their eviction in September 2012.

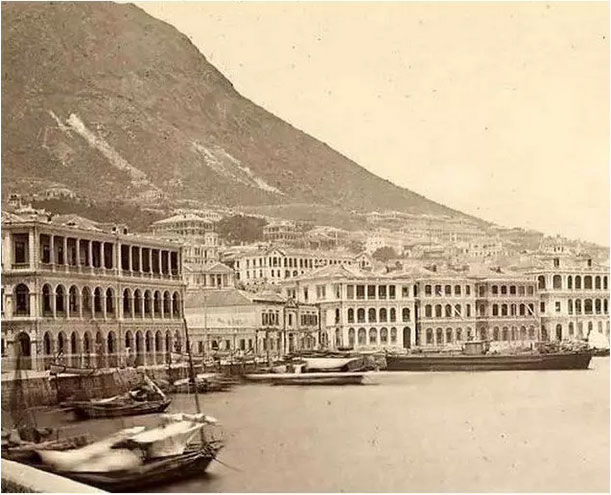
The first building on the left is Wardley House, used as an office by HSBC between 1865 and 1882, was located next to the coastline on Des Voeux Road.

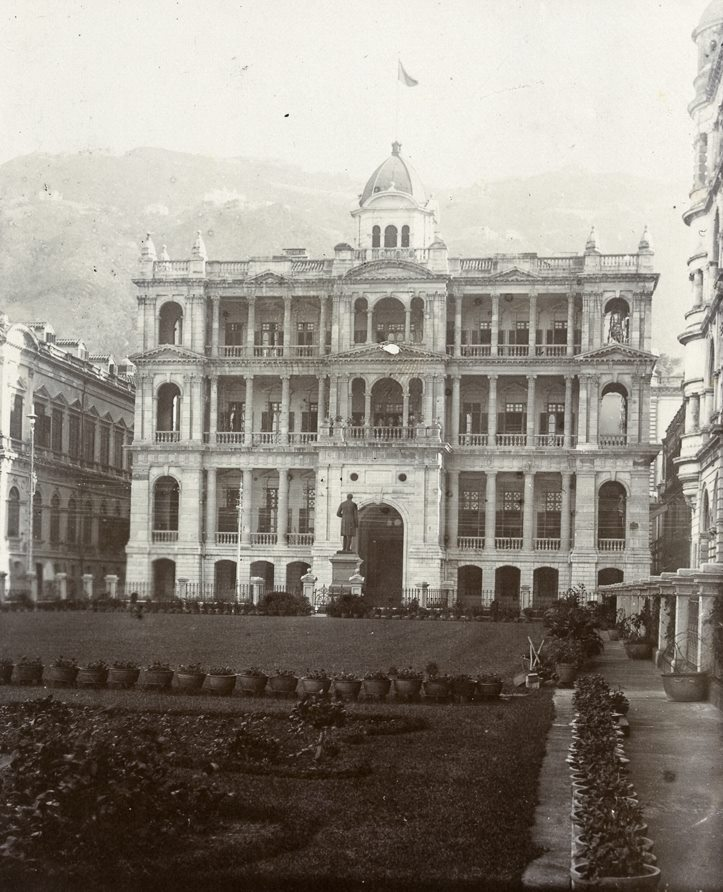
The second design of the HSBC headquarters building, used from 1886 to 1933.

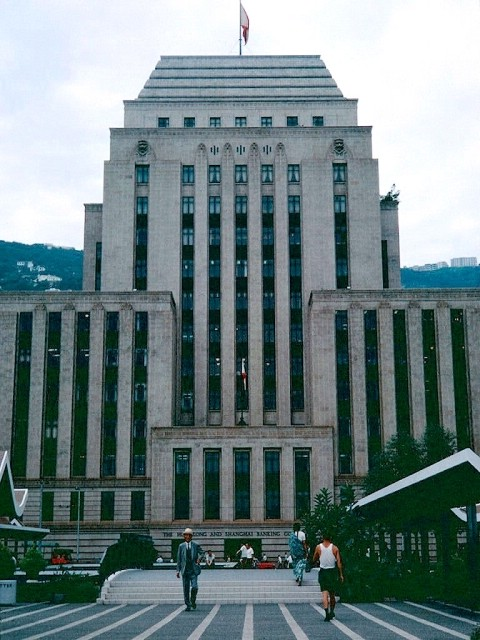
The third design of the HSBC headquarters building in 1967.

== Design ==
The new building was designed by the British architect Norman Foster and civil & structural engineers Ove Arup & Partners with service design by J. Roger Preston & Partners. It was constructed by the John Lok / Wimpey Joint Venture. From the concept to completion, it took seven years (1978–1985). The building is 178.8 metres high with 47 storeys and four basement levels. The building has a modular design consisting of five steel modules, which were prefabricated in the UK by Scott Lithgow Shipbuilders near Glasgow and shipped to Hong Kong. About 30,000 tons of steel and 4,500 tons of aluminium were used.

The HSBC Building is an example of high-tech architecture, with its modular design allowing for rapid on-site assembly. This approach enabled large open interior spaces and aligned with the principles of high-tech design, emphasizing exposed systems and functionality.

The original design was heavily inspired by the Douglas Gilling designed Qantas International Centre in Sydney.

The new lobby and its two-part Asian Story Wall were designed by Greg Pearce, of One Space Limited. Pearce was also the Principal Architect of the Hong Kong Airport Express (MTR) station. Conceived as a minimalist glass envelope, the new lobby is designed to be deferential to Foster's structure and appears almost to be part of the original.

The building was designed to not have lifts as the primary carrier of building traffic. The lifts only stop every few floors at atriums, groups of floors which are divided for specific functions. The floors are interconnected by escalators. The goal of this design is to add a social dimension and social flow to each floor, allowing for conversations to occur between floors and creating "a village in the sky". This was to shift away from the social isolation of each floor which is present with central lift systems.

=== Structural features ===
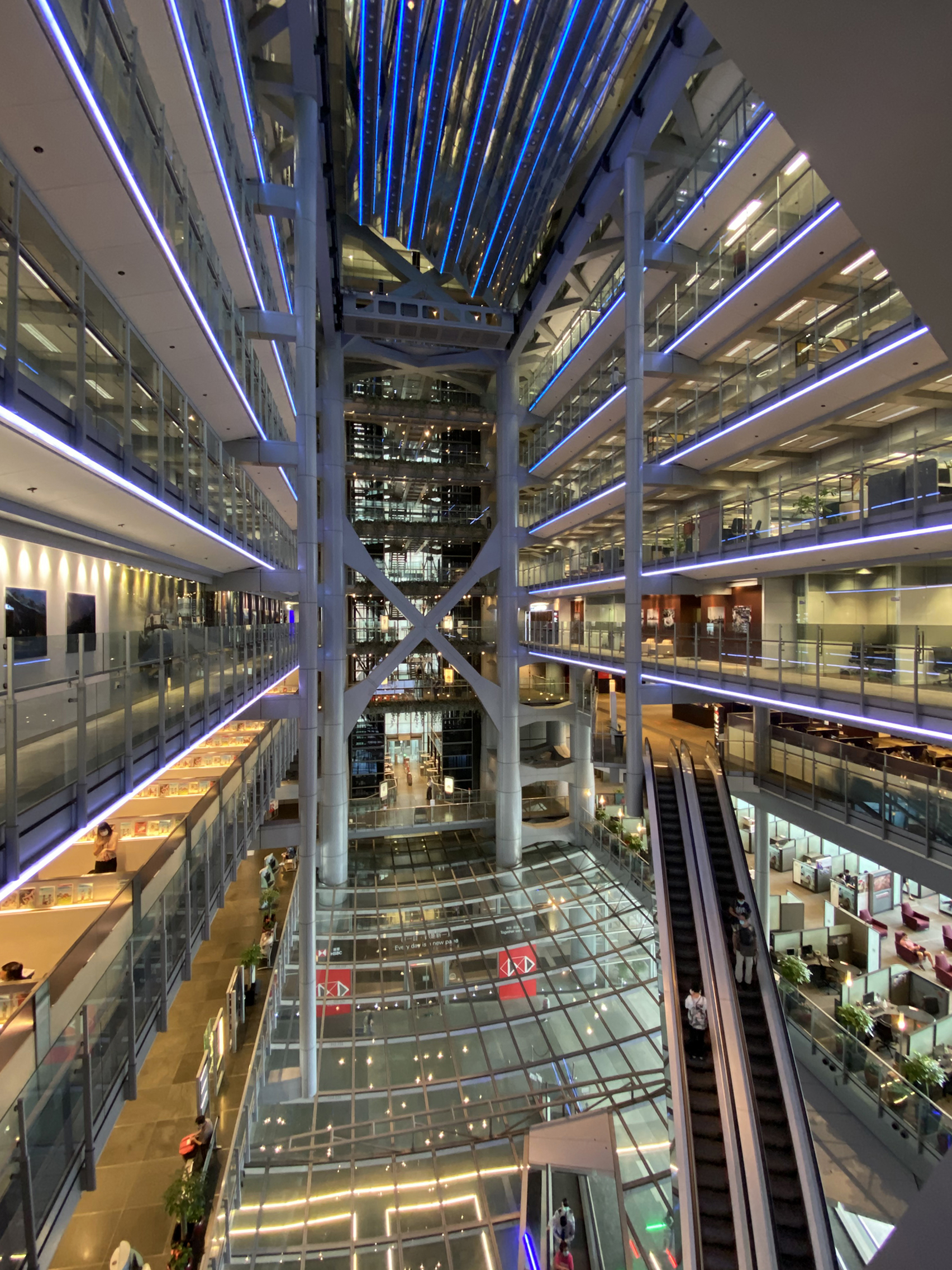
Atrium

The main characteristic of HSBC's Hong Kong headquarters is its absence of internal supporting structure. The inverted 'va' segments of the suspension trusses spanning the construction at double-height levels is the most obvious characteristic of the building. It consists of eight groups of four aluminium-clad steel columns which ascend from the foundations up through the core structure, and five levels of triangular suspension trusses which are locked into these masts.

A corrosion protection system is present because of Hong Kong's hot and humid climate. It introduces cementitious barrier coating, this process uses a special cement blend which takes humidity and increases corrosion protection rather than corroding the cladding and steel.

All flooring is made from lightweight movable panels, under which lies a comprehensive network of power, telecommunication, and air-conditioning systems. This design was to allow equipment such as computer terminals to be installed quickly and easily. Because of the urgency to finish the project, the construction of the building relied heavily on off-site prefabrication; components were manufactured all over the world. For example, the structural steel came from Britain; the glass, aluminium cladding and flooring came from the United States while the service modules came from Japan.

=== Environmental Features ===
A notable feature is that natural sunlight is the major source of lighting inside the building. There is a mirror system at the top of the atrium, which reflects natural sunlight into the building. Through the use of natural sunlight, this design helps to conserve energy and reduces energy consumption.The sun shades are provided on the external facades to block direct sunlight going into the building and to reduce heat gain.The building’s cooling system relies on seawater rather than fresh water, a solution that minimizes environmental impact in the coastal city of Hong Kong. These features, integrated seamlessly into the high-tech design and sustainable architecture.

The building was also designed to comply with safety regulations concerning typhoons and ability to shelter the public plaza on the ground floor level.

== Cultural and symbolic context ==
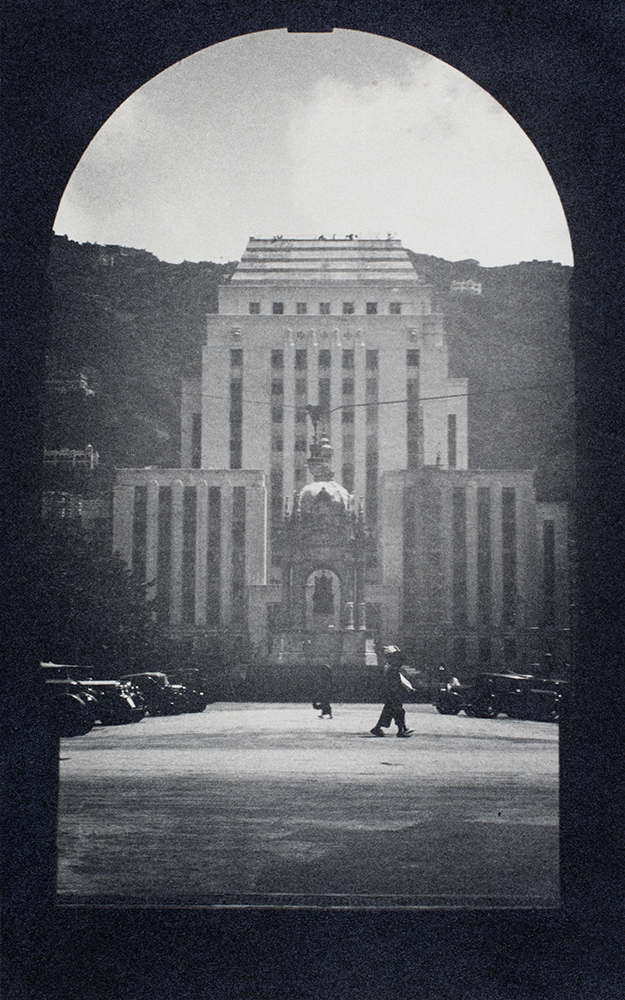
The front of the HSBC Building, Hong Kong in the 1930s showing a statue of Queen Victoria

The HSBC Building is more than a functional headquarters; it is a symbol of Hong Kong’s role as a financial powerhouse. The building’s design was intended to convey openness and innovation, aligning with the city’s rapid modernization in the 1980s. Its prominent location on Statue Square and its alignment with Victoria Harbour reflect its integration into Hong Kong’s cultural and urban identity. Today, the building remains an architectural representation of the city’s global financial influence.

== Feng shui ==
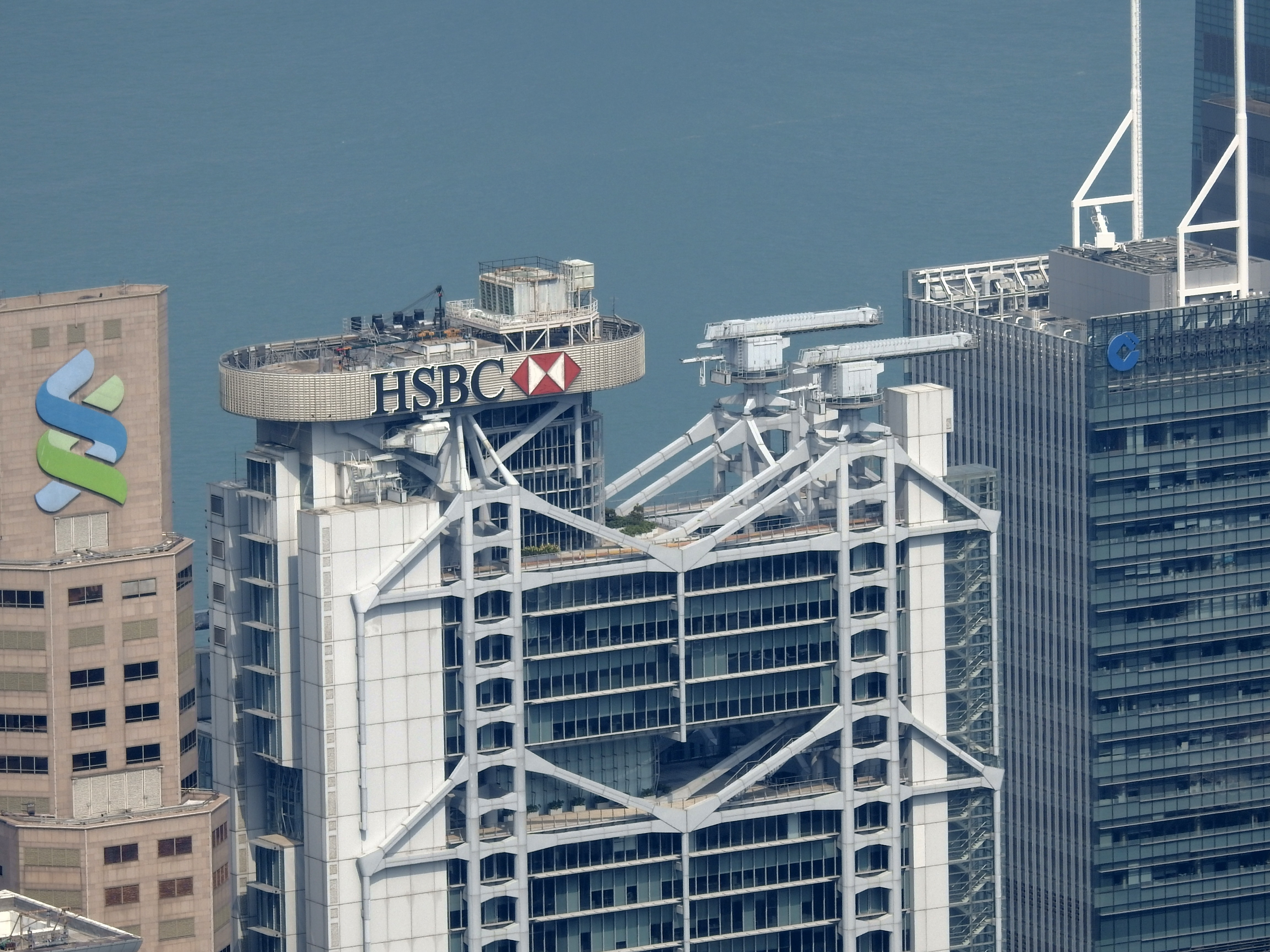
HSBC installed two "cannons" on the roof, pointing directly at the Bank of China Tower, allegedly to balance the negative feng shui energy directed at it.

The early British settlers in Hong Kong had an interest in feng shui; thus, most of the earliest buildings in Hong Kong, and many buildings constructed thereafter, were built with the philosophies of feng shui in mind. The Chinese believe that those who have a direct view of a body of water—whether it is a river, a sea, or an ocean—are more likely to prosper than those who do not (water is strongly associated with wealth in feng shui). The HSBC building has a wide open area (the Statue Square) in front of it, with no other buildings blocking its view of Victoria Harbour; thus, it is considered to have "good feng shui".

In the CBC Television series Doc Zone episode "Superstitious Minds", Writer, Researcher & Associate Producer Tom Puchniak asserts that the design of the nearby Bank of China Tower ignored feng shui principles, and created instant controversy by evoking two knife edges, one pointing towards the British Government House, another towards the HSBC building. After the Bank of China building opened, a series of mishaps occurred, including the death of the Governor, and a downturn in the city's economy. It is alleged that HSBC installed two maintenance cranes on the roof, pointing directly at the Bank of China, to defend against the negative energy from the Bank of China building. According to feng shui master Paul Hung, this solved the problem, and HSBC experienced "no harmful results after that."

But when the HSBC building was designed in the late 1970s and completed in 1985, the rooftop "cannons"—actually maintenance cranes—were already part of the original architectural plan. The Bank of China Tower was not completed until 1990. So the claim that HSBC added the cranes to counteract negative feng shui energy from the BOC building is simply false. It is a myth that has been repeated often, but it doesn't hold up to the timeline.

== Lion statues ==
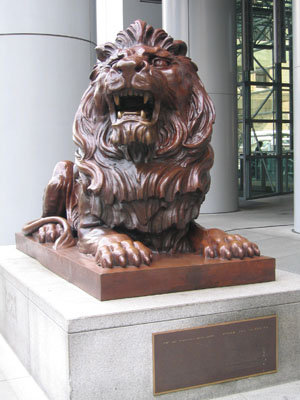
Left lion statue (Stephen)

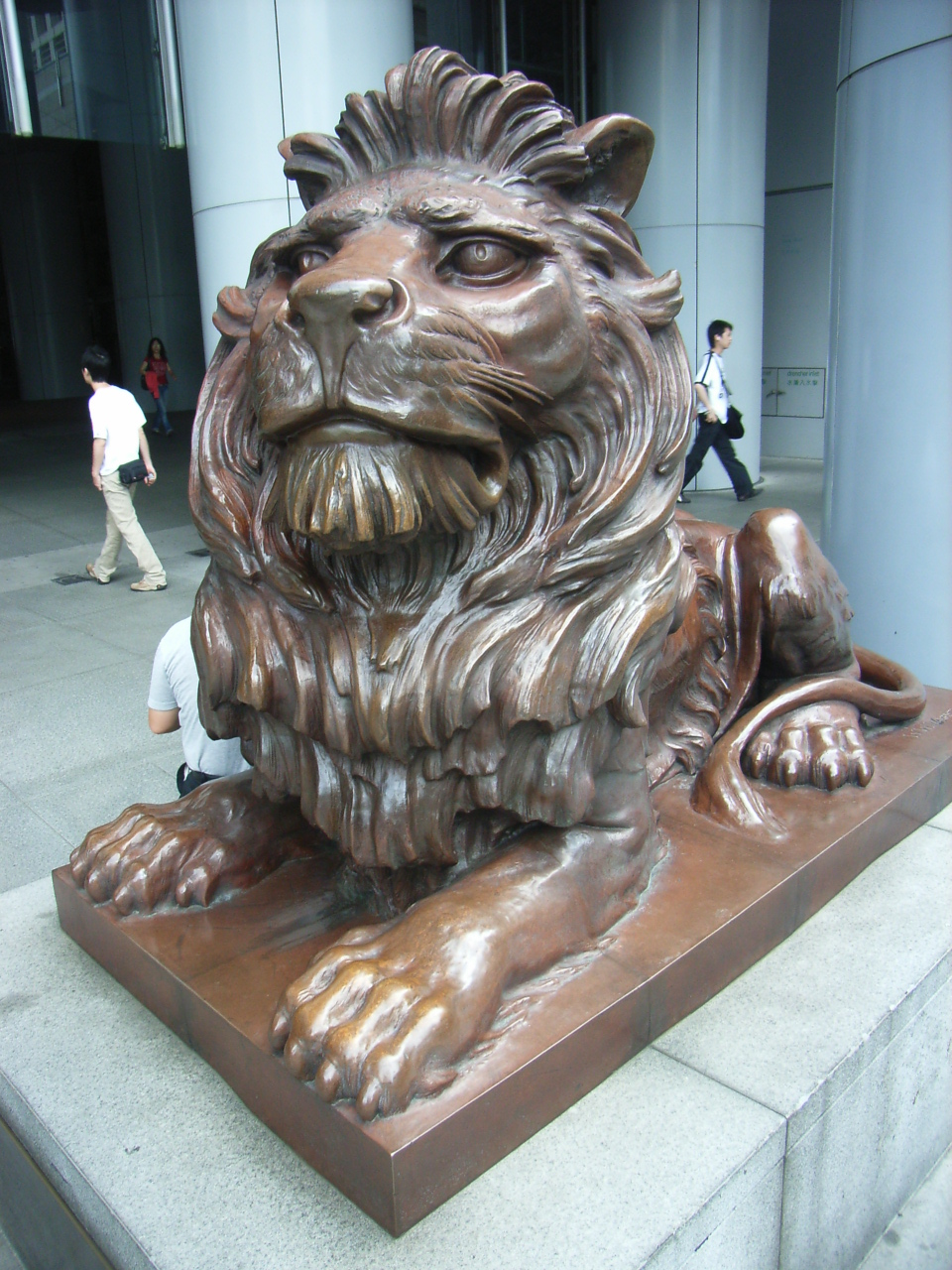
Right lion statue (Stitt)

The lion statues of HSBC Main Building

When HSBC decided to build its third headquarters at 1 Queen's Road Central, opened in 1935, it commissioned two bronze lions from Shanghai-based British sculptor W. W. Wagstaff. This commission was inspired by two earlier lions that had been ordered for the new Shanghai office opened in 1923. Cast by J W Singer & Sons in the English town of Frome, to a design by Henry Poole RA, these lions had quickly become part of the Shanghai scene, and passers-by would affectionately stroke the lions in the belief that power and money would rub off on them. They became known as Stephen and Stitt: Stephen was named for A. G. Stephen, the Chief Manager of HSBC in 1923, and G. H. Stitt, the then Shanghai Manager. Stephen is depicted roaring and Stitt is at rest, which was said to represent the characters of these two famous bankers.

Like the Shanghai lions, the Hong Kong lions became objects of veneration, and foci of the Bank's perceived excellent feng shui. People are known to still bring their children to stroke the paws and noses of the statues hoping for luck and prosperity.

During World War II, the lions were confiscated by the Japanese and sent to Japan to be melted down. The war ended before this could happen, and the lions were recognised by an American sailor in a dockyard in Osaka in 1945. They were returned a few months later and restored to their original positions in October 1946.

During the demolition of the building in 1981, the lions were temporarily moved to Statue Square, opposite the main entrance. As a mark of the respect the lions were held in, the move to Statue Square and the move back in 1985 were accompanied by the chairman Sir Michael Sandberg and senior management of the Bank. The placement of the lions both temporarily and in their current locations was made only after extensive consultations with feng shui practitioners.

The lion named Stephen has shrapnel scars in its left hind-quarters dating from the fighting in the Battle of Hong Kong. When this pair of lions was used as the model for the pair commissioned for the new UK Headquarters of HSBC in 2002, Zambian-born New Zealand sculptor Mark Kennedy was asked not to reproduce these "war wounds" in the copies as the shrapnel marks were seen as historical battle-scars.

The following is a list of bronze copies and re-casts of the HSBC lions:

- In Hong Kong:
  - Hong Kong (1935) – modelled on Shanghai originals; sculpted by W W Wagstaff, cast by Shanghai Arts and Crafts.
  - Hong Kong (replicas) (2015) – copies of Hong Kong lions; for the celebration of the 150th anniversary of HSBC; placed at the lobby of HSBC Centre, HSBC's back office headquarter in Hong Kong.
- In China:
  - Shanghai (original) (1923) – sculpted by Henry Poole RA, cast by J W Stinger & Sons. The originals are held by the Shanghai Historic Museum (which currently has no permanent home) and are separately on display at the Museum's display room under the Oriental Pearl Tower (Stephen) and the Shanghai Banking Museum (Stitt), both in Lujiazui.
  - Shanghai (replicas) (c. 1997) – copies of Shanghai originals, commissioned by the government-owned Shanghai Pudong Development Bank after it obtained the former HSBC building.
  - Shanghai (current) (2010) – copies of Hong Kong lions.
- In the United Kingdom
  - London (2001) – copies of Hong Kong lions; cast by Bronze Age Foundry, Limehouse, at the direction of Mark Kennedy.
  - Birmingham (2018) – copies of Hong Kong lions.

Other HSBC branches throughout the world feature small-scaled replicas of these originals, with varying degrees of faithfulness. Some HSBC branches often feature guardian lions to different designs, such as Chinese guardian lions.

== Lighting scheme ==
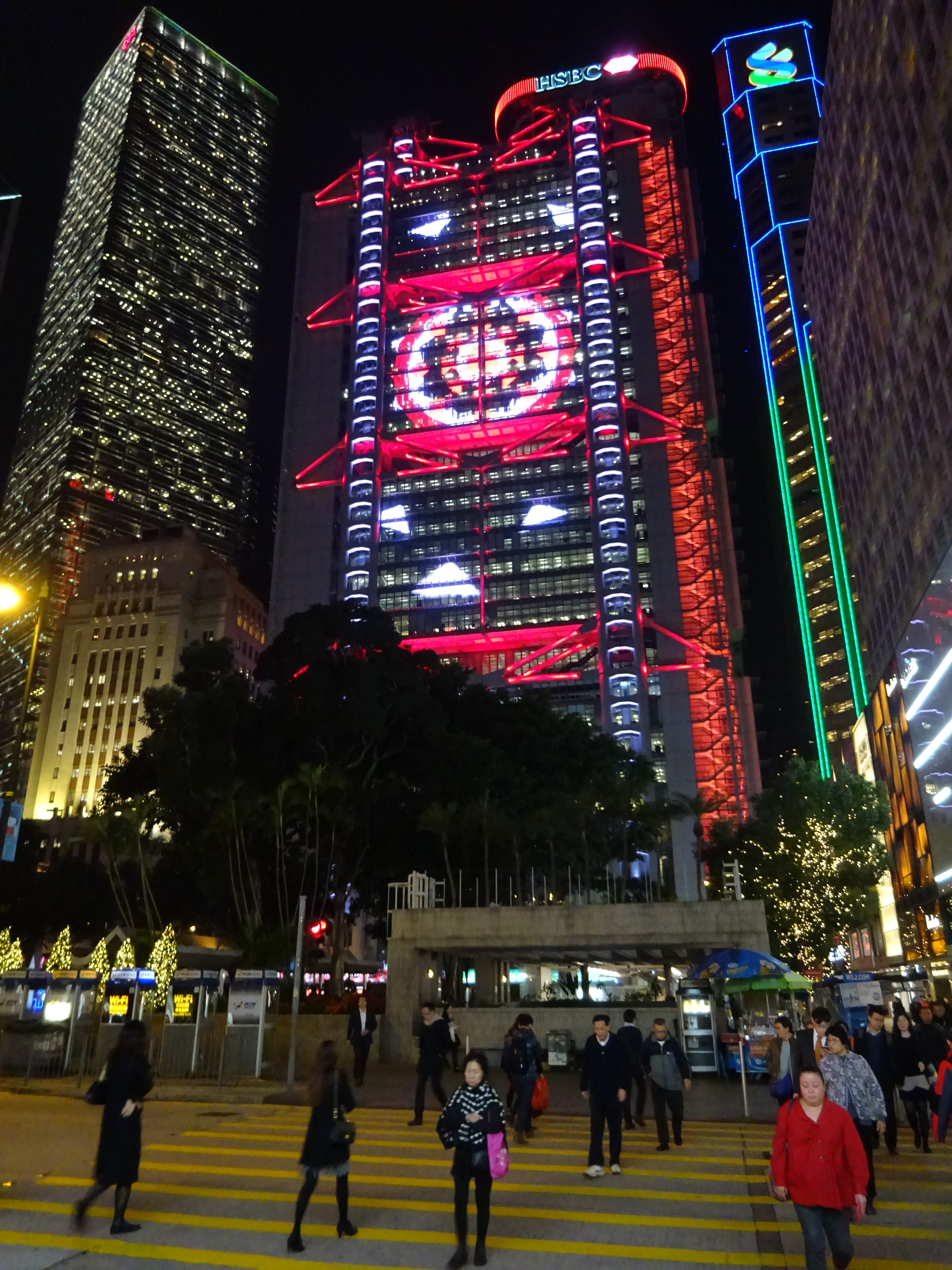
The HSBC Main Building at night

In 2003, the Hong Kong Tourism Board developed a harbour lighting plan called "A Symphony of Lights", a large-scale multimedia show featuring lighting, laser, music, and occasionally special pyrotechnics effects during festivals, to promote tourism in Hong Kong. The show was based on the illumination of key buildings on the Hong Kong Island side, and was best viewed from the Kowloon side across the Victoria Harbour. The HSBC Hong Kong headquarters building was one of the participating buildings in the show.

== See also ==
- List of buildings and structures in Hong Kong
- Timeline of tallest buildings in Hong Kong
- Economy of Hong Kong
- HSBC Centre in Tai Kok Tsui, Kowloon
