= Mario Raggi =

Italian sculptor (1821–1907)

- Born: 1821; Carrara, Italy
- Died: 26 November 1907 (aged 85–86); Farnham, England
- Education: Accademia di Belle Arti di Carrara
- Occupation: Sculptor
- Known for: Public works, statues of civic figures

Mario Raggi (1821 – 26 November 1907) was an Italian sculptor who settled in England, where he received several public commissions for statues of civic figures.

== Biography ==
Raggi was born in Carrara, Italy, where he learnt to sculpt, and won several prizes, at the local Accademia di Belle Arti di Carrara. He continued his training in Rome under Pietro Tenerani before moving in 1850 to London, where he first worked for Raffaelle Monti and then, for several years, for Matthew Noble. In 1875, Raggi established his own studio in London.

Raggi was given some major commissions including memorials to Benjamin Disraeli at Parliament Square and Gladstone for Albert Square, Manchester. He completed three monumental statues of Queen Victoria for Hong Kong, Toronto and Kimberley in South Africa. A bronze statue by Raggi of Henry Vivian, 1st Baron Swansea, wearing a frock coat and gown stands in Swansea city centre. Raggi first exhibited a work, Innocence at the Royal Academy in 1854 but did not show there again until 1878, when he exhibited a portrait bust of Admiral Rous. He continued to exhibit portrait busts at the Academy until 1895.

Raggi is buried at West Norwood Cemetery, where his memorial is a flat slab.

== Selected public works ==
Image	Title / subject	Location and coordinates	Date	Type	Material	Dimensions	Designation	Wikidata	Notes
	Evan Pierce memorial	Denbigh, Denbighshire	1872	Relief panels on pillar with statue	Bronze panels on limestone column with marble statue	15m high	Grade II*		Panels by Raggi, column by Martin Underwood, statue by W & T Wills
More images	Statue of Benjamin Disraeli	Parliament Square, London	1883	Statue on pedestal	Bronze and granite		Grade II	Q18161998	
	Archbishop Archibald Tait Memorial	Old Medical School, Teviot Place, Edinburgh	1885	Bust in niche	Bronze		Category A		
More images	Henry Vivian, 1st Baron Swansea	City centre, Swansea	1886	Statue on pedestal	Bronze and granite	4.8m high	Grade II	Q29490036	
More images	Howel Gwyn	Victoria Gardens, Neath	1889	Statue on pedestal	Bronze and granite	5.5m high	Grade II	Q29490196	
More images	Statue of Queen Victoria	Victoria Park, Hong Kong	1896	Statue on pedestal	Bronze and granite			Q47305137	
	Vulcan	Pinnacle of Sheffield Town Hall, South Yorkshire	1897	Statue	Bronze				
More images	William Ewart Gladstone	Albert Square, Manchester	1901	Statue on pedestal	Bronze, granite and sandstone		Grade II	Q26492263	
More images	Queen Victoria	Queen's Park, Toronto	1903	Statue on pedestal with bronze reliefs	Bronze and stone			Q122206391	Commissioned 1870, unveiled 1903. Bronze reliefs by J.L. Banks.
More images	Statue of Sir Thomas Jackson, 1st Baronet	Statue Square, Hong Kong	1906	Statue on pedestal	Bronze and stone			Q48802351	
	William Crowther	Franklin Square, Hobart, Tasmania		Statue on pedestal	Bronze and stone				
