= HKFS =

HKFS may refer to:

- Hong Kong Federation of Students, a student organisation
- Hong Kong Flower Show, an annual exhibition
