= James Greig (banker) =

James Greig JP (born 1834) was second chief manager of the Hongkong & Shanghai Banking Corporation (now HSBC) and member of the Legislative Council of Hong Kong. Greig was the Hong Kong branch manager of the Asiatic Banking Corporation before he joined HSBC in 1869.

He became acting chief manager of the Bank in 1871 when Victor Kresser retired, and official chief manager from 1871 to 1876. He was responsible for handling the first public loan by the Qing government in 1874. He committed the bank to a Fuzhou loan denominated in sterling of £27,615, at the agreed but arbitrary exchange rate of 2 million taels. He retired as chief manager in 1876, and was succeeded by Thomas Jackson.

Greig was appointed a member of the Legislative Council of Hong Kong in February 1872 when Henry John Ball acted as Chief Justice, and was made Justice of the Peace in March 1872. He was also elected Trustee of Hong Kong's St John's Anglican Cathedral.

Business positions
Preceded by Victor Kresser	Chief Manager of the Hongkong and Shanghai Banking Corporation; 1871–1876	Succeeded by Thomas Jackson
Legislative Council of Hong Kong
Preceded by Henry John Ball	Unofficial Member; 1872	Succeeded by Henry John Ball
