= Hong Kong Brands and Products Expo =

Hong Kong trade fair

- Traditional Chinese: 香港國際工業出品展銷會
- Simplified Chinese: 香港国际工业出品展销会
Transcriptions
Standard Mandarin
- Hanyu Pinyin: Xiānggǎng guójì gōngyè chūpǐn zhǎnxiāohuì
Yue: Cantonese
- Jyutping: hoeng1 gong2 gwok3 zai gung1 jip6 ceot1 ban2 zin2 siu1 wui5

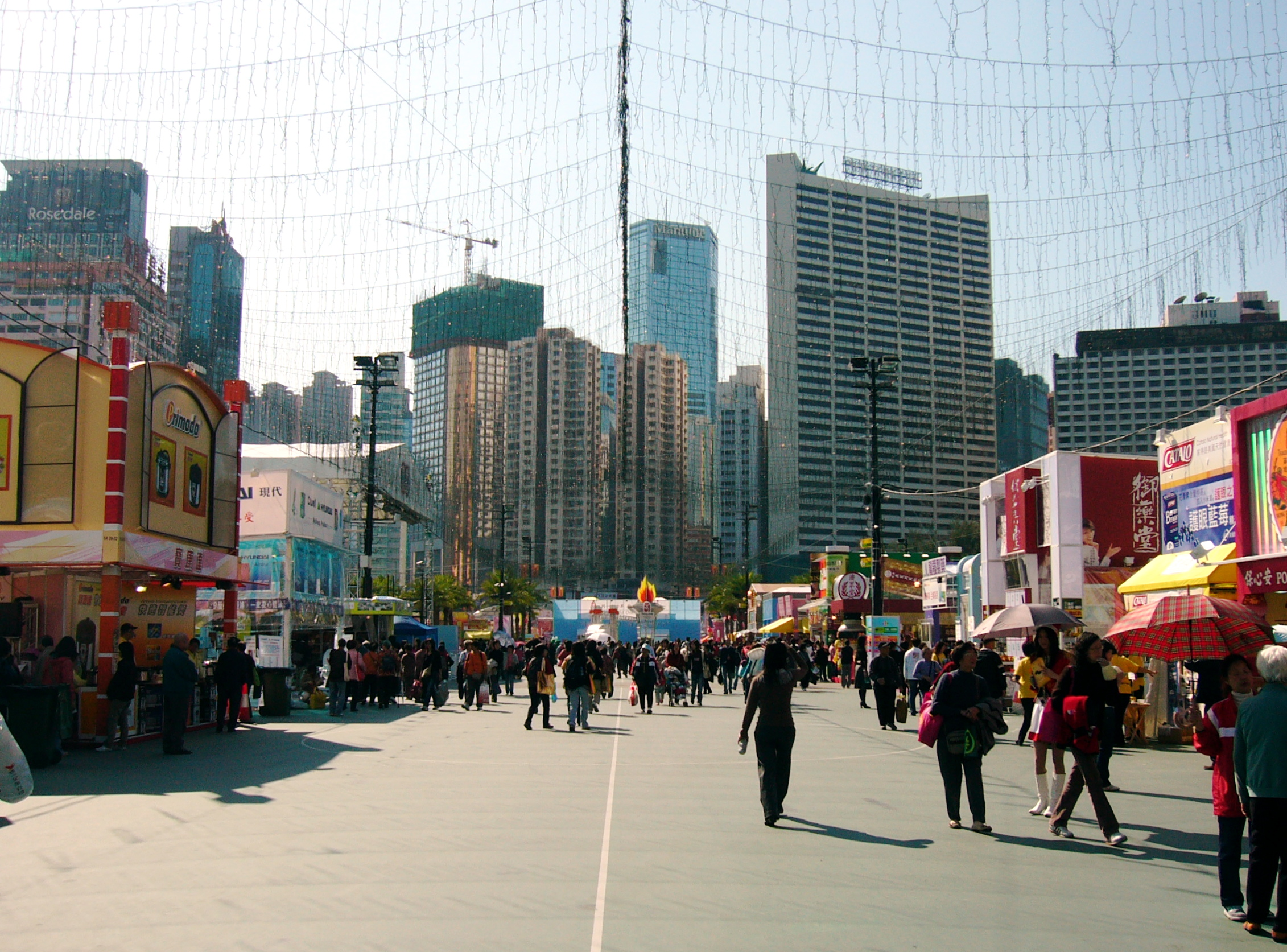
Hong Kong Brands and Products Expo 2006

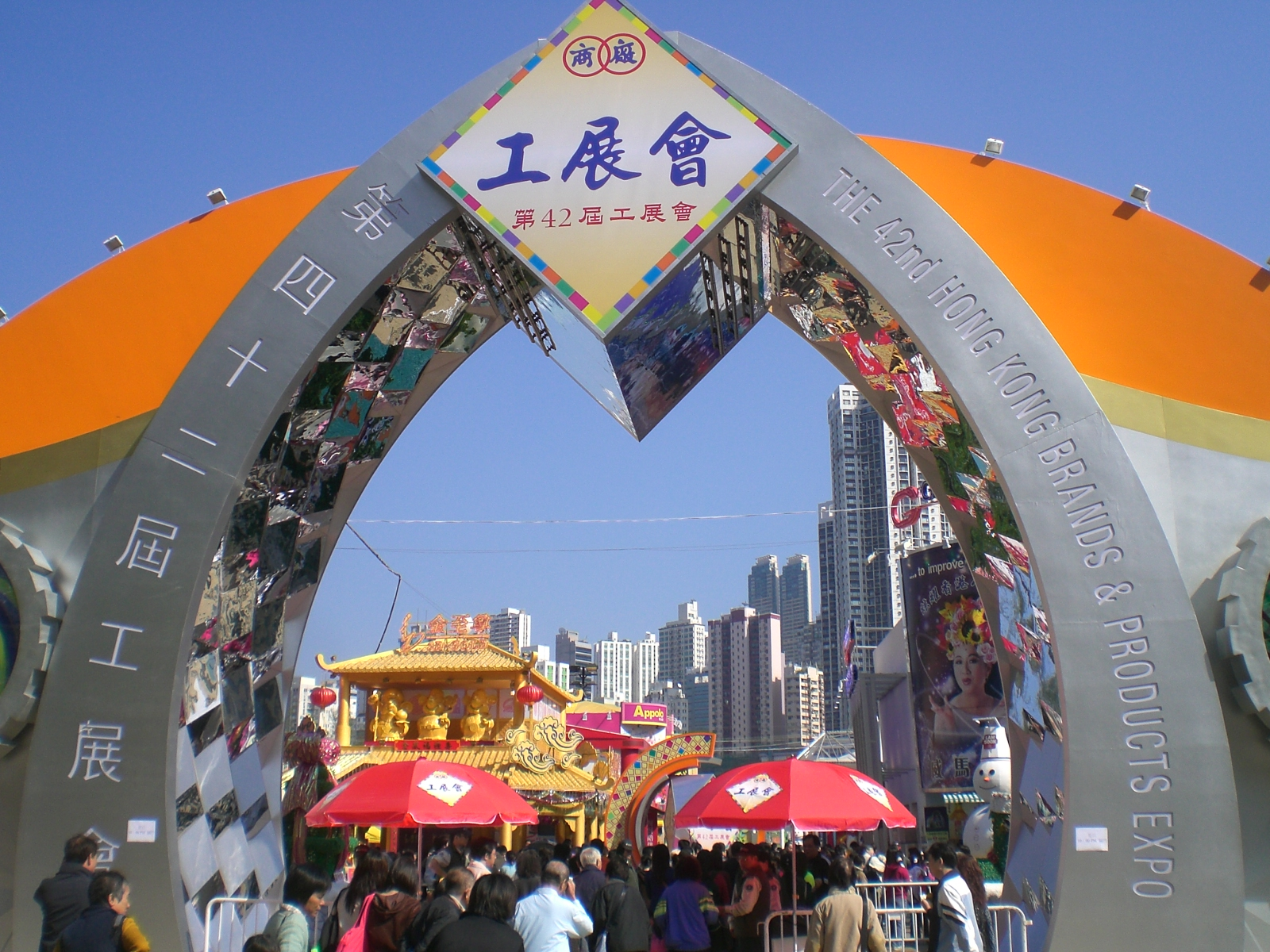
The year 42 in December 2007

Hong Kong Brands and Products Expo (Chinese: 香港國際工業出品展銷會, or in short 工展會) is a large expo of local products held annually in Hong Kong, at Victoria Park. It was originally established in 1938, and was renamed as Hong Kong Brands and Products Expo in 1994. It is organised by The Chinese Manufacturers' Association of Hong Kong (CMA).

== History ==
The Hong Kong Brands and Products Expo originated in the 1930s when mainland China started to impose import tariffs, leading to Hong Kong manufacturers’ exports facing major setbacks. Amid their difficulty, they decided to explore the Southeast Asia market, and did so by joining the 1st Chinese Products Expo in Singapore in 1935. As Hong Kong products are received quite well in Southeast Asia, the region quickly became one of the main exporting markets for Hong Kong. Once Hong Kong products are established in overseas market, they began to develop their local market immediately.

=== 1938 to 1974 ===
The first exhibition was co-organized by the Chinese Manufacturers' Association and Hong Kong YWCA, held from 2 to 8 April in 1938 at St. Paul's College under the name Exhibition of Chinese Products. Using the slogan “Chinese People should use Chinese Goods”, it aimed to encourage Hong Kong citizens and the Chinese diaspora to support Chinese-made products. In 1950, the 8th Exhibition was instead renamed Exhibition of Hong Kong Products and started to focus on goods manufactured in Hong Kong rather than mainland China. The slogan also changed to “Hong Kong people use Hong Kong goods”, to encourage local consumers to purchase goods manufactured in Hong Kong.

The event grew rapidly in popularity after World War II. In the 1960s and '70s, it attracted nearly 2,000 exhibitors and over 1.5 million visitors each year. Due to the government not allocating land for a permanent exhibition venue, the CMA stopped staging the exhibition in 1974.

From 1938 to 1974, 31 Hong Kong products exhibitions were organised. The number of exhibitors increased significantly from 40 in the first year to about 2,000 in the last, and the visitor count went from 30,000 to around 2 million.

=== 1994 onwards ===
In celebration of its 60th anniversary, the exhibition was staged again in 1994 and renamed Hong Kong Brands and Products Expo. The 4-day expo, which was held at Hong Kong Convention and Exhibition Centre, was attended by 200,000 visitors. The 33rd to 37th HKBPE was then held at Tamar Site in Central from 1998 to 2002, and was relocated to Victoria Park in Causeway Bay in 2003.

In 2008, the event had an attendance of 2.16 million people, and took in sales of HK$270 million in its 23 days, which was 20 percent more than in 2007.

In 2004, an additional version of the Expo was held outside of Hong Kong for the first time, at the Exhibition Centre in Shanghai.
