= Statue of Queen Victoria, Hong Kong =

Statue in Hong Kong

Statue of Queen Victoria
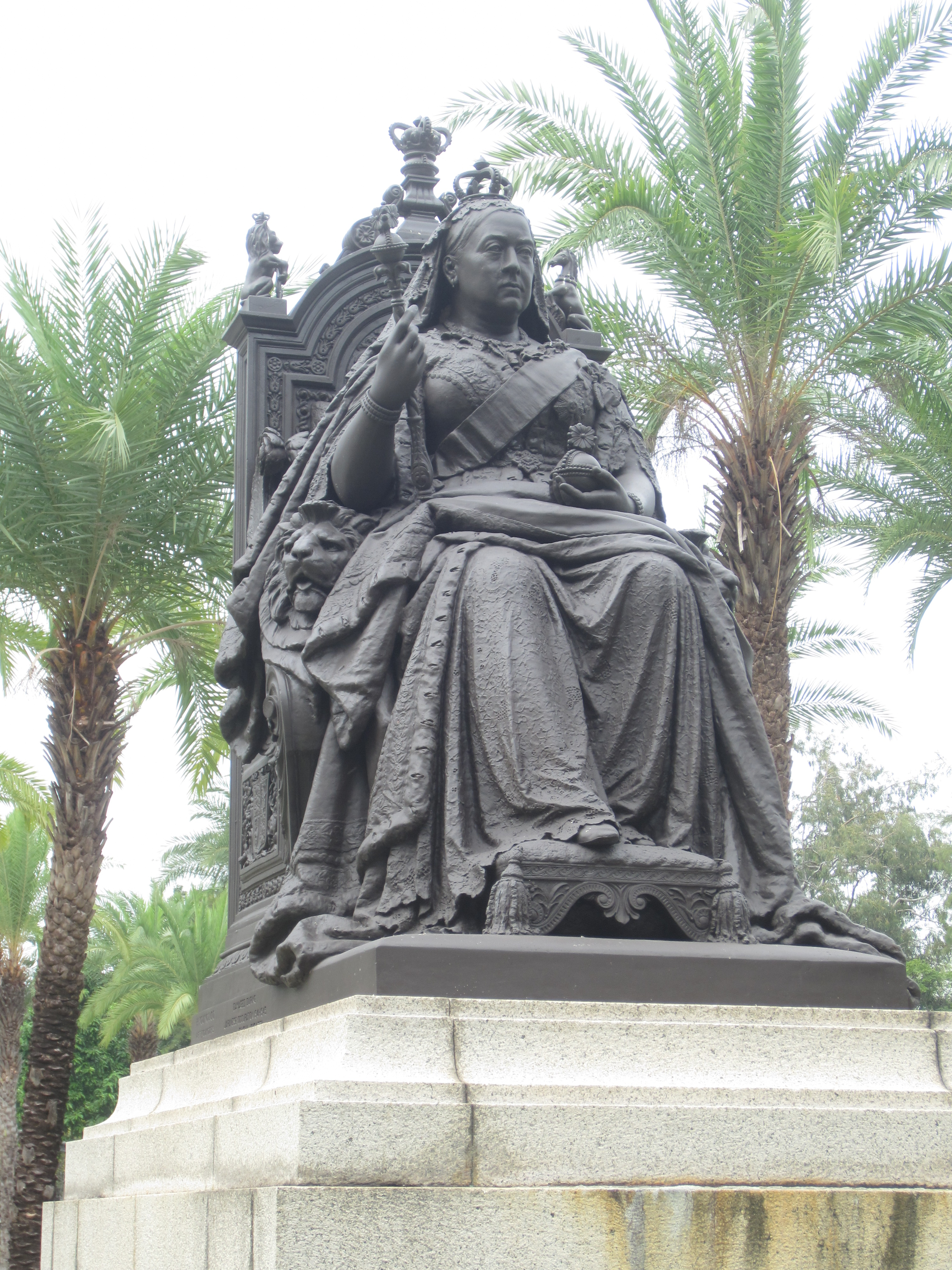
- The statue in Victoria Park in 2017
- Artist: Mario Raggi
- Medium: Bronze sculpture
- Subject: Queen Victoria
- Location: Hong Kong; 22.281115°N 114.189348°E

The statue of Queen Victoria is a bronze sculpture by Mario Raggi. It is currently installed in Victoria Park, in Causeway Bay, Wan Chai District, Hong Kong, near the Causeway Road entrance of the park.

== History ==
This statue was cast in Pimlico, London, and was originally installed at the centre of Statue Square in Central, the main business district of Hong Kong, where it was unveiled by then-Governor William Robinson on 28 May 1896, the day officially appointed for the celebration of the seventy-seventh birthday of Queen Victoria. During the Japanese occupation of Hong Kong, it was taken to Japan to be melted down, along with other statues from the square. After the war, the statue of Queen Victoria was brought back to Hong Kong, but the other statues were never found. In 1952, the late Queen Victoria's statue was restored and placed in Victoria Park.

In 1996, shortly before Hong Kong's handover to China, artist Pun Sing-lui tipped red paint over the statue and smashed its nose with a hammer. Pun was a recent immigrant from Mainland China who had become disillusioned with Hong Kong culture. The vandalism intended to serve as a protest against "dull colonial culture" and to encourage "cultural reunification with 'red' China". His actions were decried as vandalism "in discord with popular opinions and the concurrent cultural atmosphere" and an "attack on Hong Kong culture". The statue was subsequently restored, at a cost of $150,000.

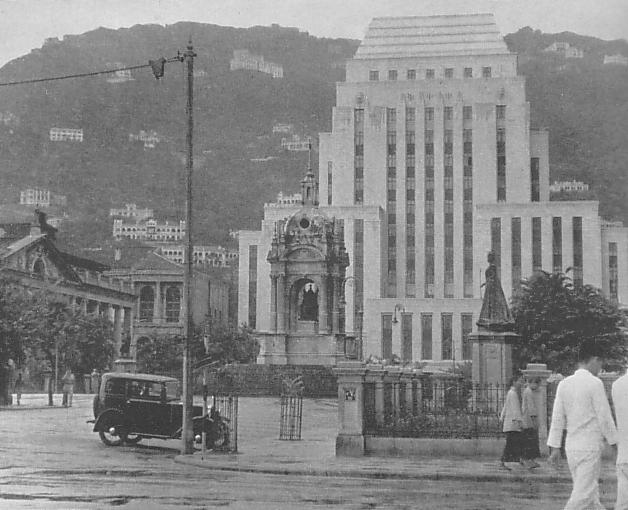
Statue Square in the 1930s, looking south toward the HSBC building in Central. The canopy of the statue is visible.

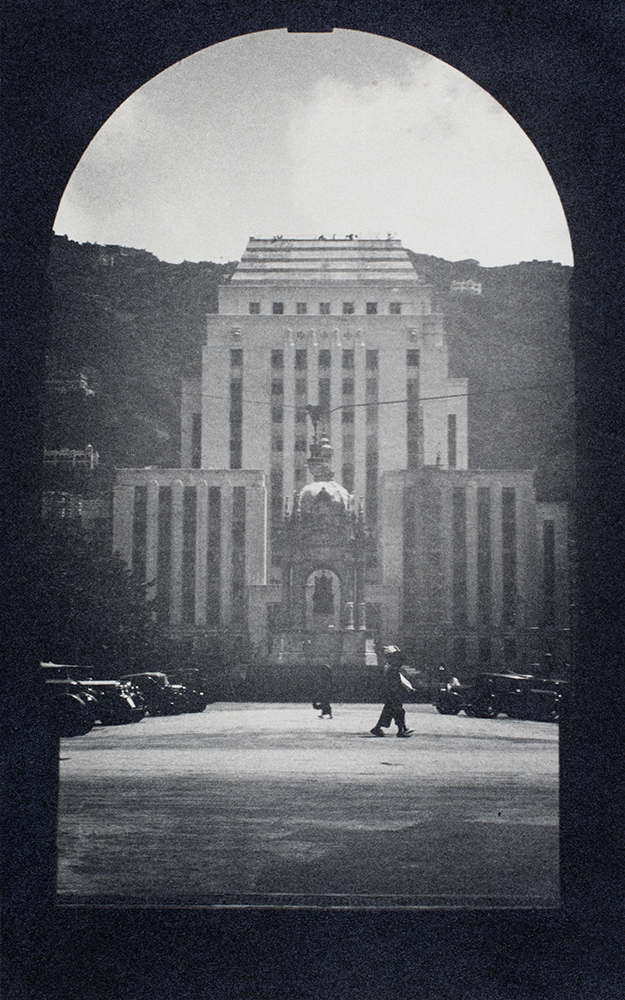
A black and white photo shows a statue of Queen Victoria in front of the HSBC Building, Hong Kong in the 1930s.

== See also ==
- List of statues of Queen Victoria
- Queen's Park, Toronto, where a statue of Queen Victoria by Mario Raggi is also installed
