= Pierce Memorial Garden =

Urban park in Denbigh, Wales

Evan Pierce Memorial Garden
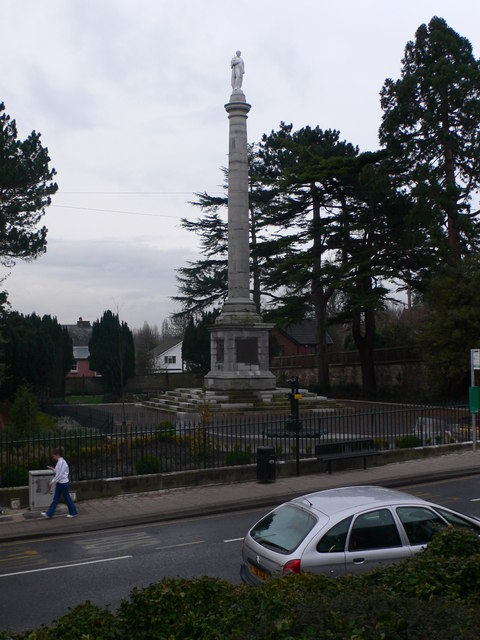
- Memorial to Evan Pierce

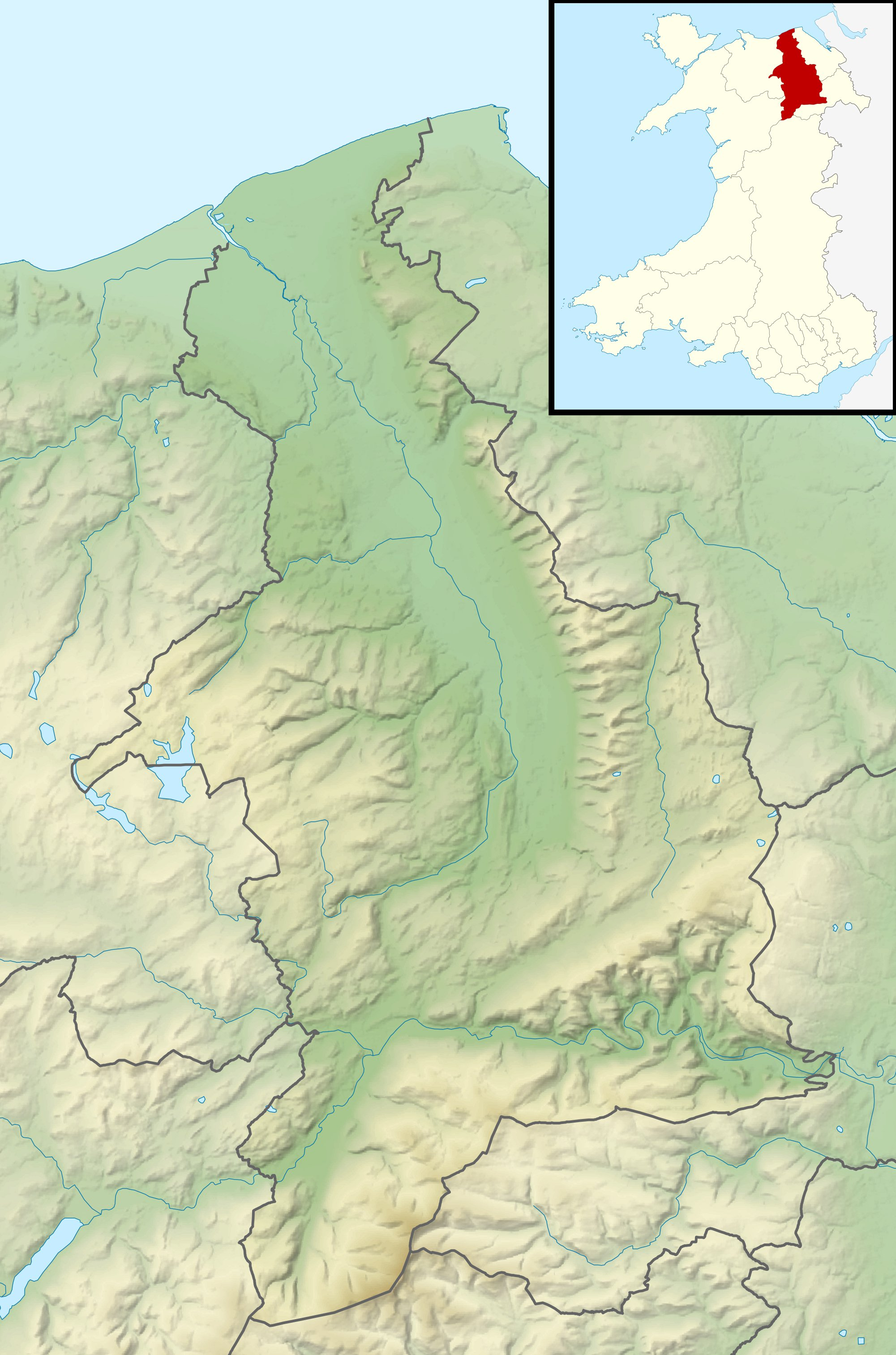
- Location within Denbighshire
- Type: Public park
- Location: Denbigh, Denbighshire, Wales
- Coordinates: 53.1856°N 3.4137°W
- Created: 1874-87
- Operator: Denbighshire County Council
- Status: Open year round
- Website

Cadw/ICOMOS Register of Parks and Gardens of Special Historic Interest in Wales
- Official name: Pierce Memorial Garden
- Designated: 1 February 2022
- Reference no.: PGW(C)66(DEN)
- Listing: Grade II

Listed Building – Grade II*
- Official name: Pierce's Memorial
- Designated: 24 October 1950
- Reference no.: 1049

Listed Building – Grade II
- Official name: Jubilee Fountain to the N of Pierce's Memorial
- Designated: 2 February 1981
- Reference no.: 1050

Listed Building – Grade II
- Official name: Jubilee Fountain to the NW of Pierce's Memorial
- Designated: 2 February 1981
- Reference no.: 1051

The Pierce Memorial Garden is an urban park in the town of Denbigh, in Denbighshire, Wales. It was constructed between 1874 and 1887 and commemorates Evan Pierce who donated the land. Pierce, a doctor, sat on Denbigh Town Council for 50 years and served five terms of office as mayor. The garden is registered Grade II on the Register of Parks and Gardens of Special Historic Interest in Wales. The statue depicting Pierce is listed at Grade II*. The park is managed by Denbighshire County Council.

== History and description ==
Evan Pierce was born in Denbigh and trained as a doctor. He later worked as the County coroner for Denbighshire. He sat as an alderman on Denbigh town council for over 50 years and served as mayor on five occasions. While a medical student in Edinburgh, and subsequently in practice in his home town, Pierce gained considerable public recognition for his work in combatting the cholera pandemic. In recognition of this, and of his other works in the town, a public subscription was raised to construct a commemorative garden. Pierce himself donated the land for the garden in the early 1870s, (Note: Pierce was a noted benefactor of Denbigh. Near to the garden is the Dr Evan Pierce Memorial Hall, which he built at his own expense in memory of his mother.) the foundation stone was laid in 1872 and work continued for another decade, the column being completed in 1885. (Note: Cadw notes the peculiarity of the memorial being erected in Pierce's lifetime.) Pierce also funded the two fountains at the entrance to the garden, erected to commemorate the Golden Jubilee of Queen Victoria in 1887. (Note: Jo Darke, in her study, The Monument Guide to England and Wales, records that, on his death in 1895, Pierce was put on display for public veneration; "propped up in his coffin, wearing black bow tie and pork pie hat.")

The gardens were restored in 2007 by Purcell Miller Triton.

The memorial set within the park is a column topped by a statue of Pierce. The statue was sculpted by W. and T. Wills, the column by Martin Underwood and the relief panels on the column are by Mario Raggi. The memorial is a Grade II* listed structure and the garden is listed Grade II on the Cadw/ICOMOS Register of Parks and Gardens of Special Historic Interest in Wales. The two fountains are listed at Grade II.

== Gallery ==
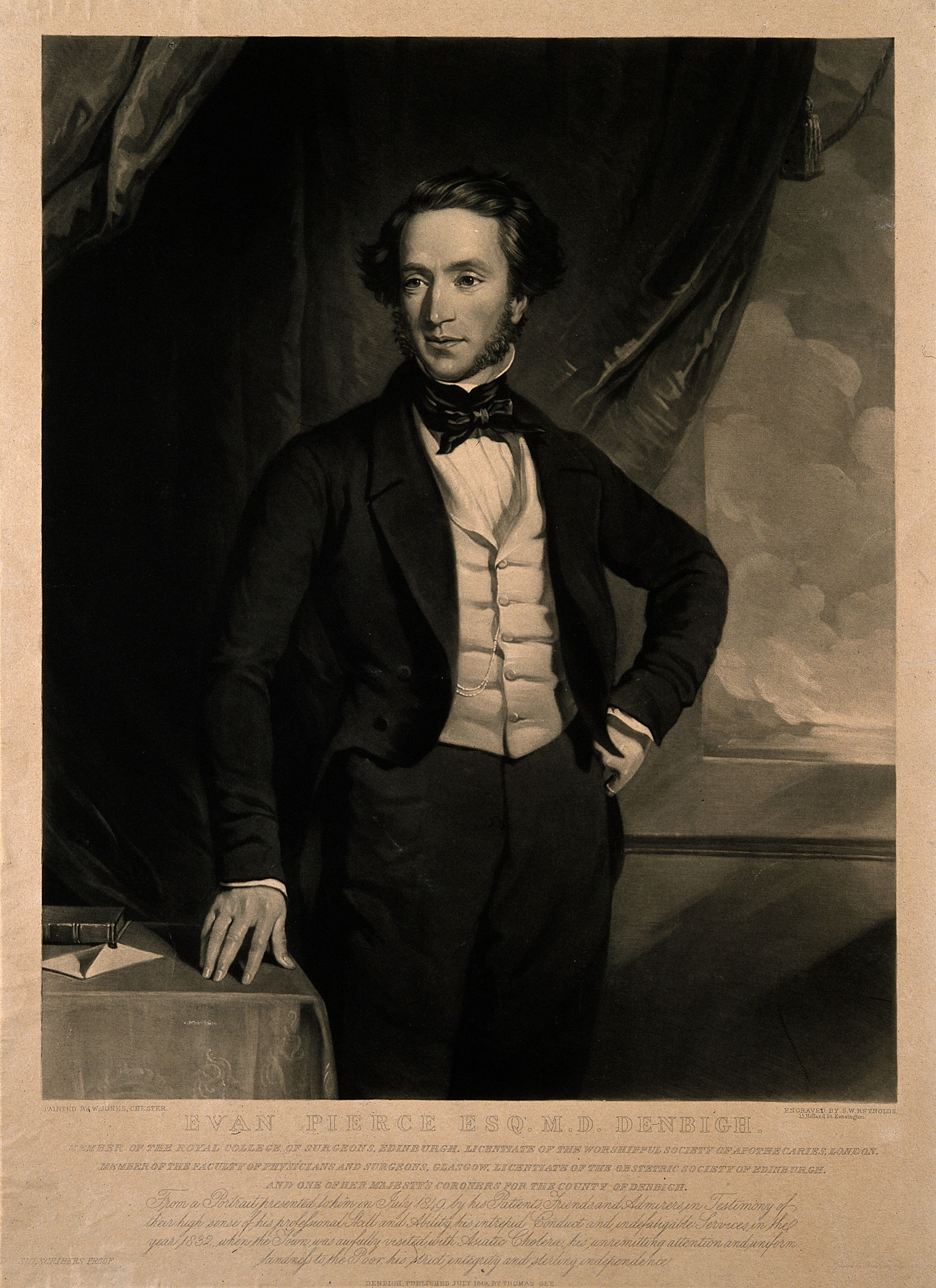
Evan Pierce

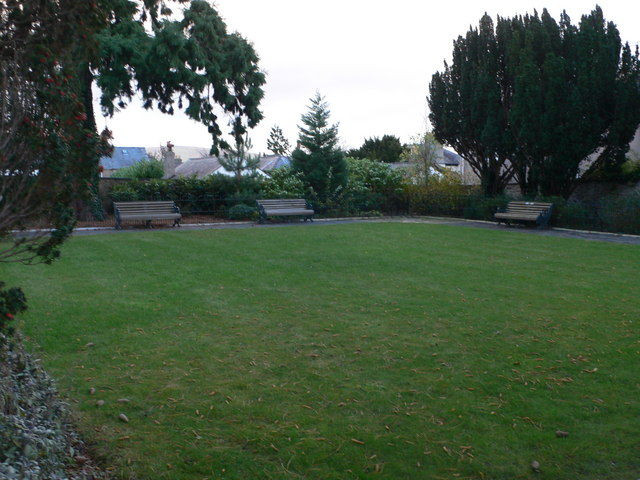
The garden

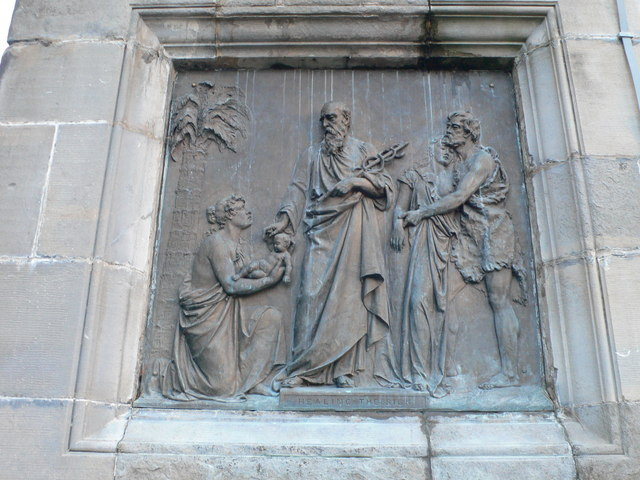
Relief by Mario Raggi

== Sources ==
- Darke, Jo (1991). The Monument Guide to England and Wales: A National Portrait in Bronze and Stone. London: MacDonald and Co. OCLC 1008240876.
- Hubbard, Edward (2003) [1986]. Clwyd. The Buildings of Wales. New Haven, US and London: Yale University Press. ISBN 0-300-09627-5.
