= Pun Sing-lui =

Performance artist

Pun Sing-lui (Chinese: 潘星磊; pinyin: Pān Xīnglěi, born in 1969) is a mainland-trained performance artist and Hong Kong resident. His most notable and contested work is Red Action, which he staged after he attended the June Forth vigil held annually in Victoria Park in Hong Kong in 1995. This performance was covered by many local and international press and art historical studies as it was seen as a response to colonial politics, as well as an act of "artistic urge" and vandalism. Some consider it as "the most famous political stunt in Hong Kong history".

== Early life and education ==
Pun was born in Liaoning. He was a participant of the 1989 Tiananmen Square protests. A photograph of him going on a hunger strike during the protests was featured on the cover of Le tremblement de terre de Pékin, a 1991 book about the uprising written by French authors Michel Bonnin, Jean-Philippe Béja, and Alain Peyraube.

In 1992, Pan graduated from the Sculpture Department Central Academy of Fine Arts in Beijing and immigrated to Hong Kong.

== Renowned vandalism ==
Pan's most well-known performance work is named Red Action. On 16 September 1996, shortly before Hong Kong's handover to China, Pun covered the bronze statue of Queen Victoria in a public park with a layer of red paint, and smashed its nose with a hammer. The artist then waited for the press and the police to arrive and claimed his pviolence was a protest against the "colonial culture" in Hong Kong before undergoing court-mandated psychological evaluation and imprisonment for twenty-eight days. The statue was subsequently restored, at a cost of $150,000.

For Pun, vandalising the statue represents an act of reclaiming agency, an opportunity to reject colonial culture, even if the Chinese went in great number to exploit the colony, considering the low quality life from China, and to challenge the values that the statue symbolises in "a period of colonial domination." In an interview with Mariana Wan in the South China Morning Post, Pun offered the following rationale for his performance:

"I smashed this statue. The message is loud and clear: I am saying no to colonial culture. I do not hold anything against Queen Victoria personally. What I am against is the era the statue represents; an era of colonialism. A lot of people do not know why this statue is in the park. Or if they know they are not aware of its significance . . . In Hong Kong, nobody thinks hard on the significance of the statue of Queen Victoria. A lot of artists and people said they had fond feelings towards this statue; that as children, they had played under it. This I find very strange. I don't know whether that is due to the fact that Hong Kong has neglected its education on historical and cultural matters . . . A museum is a perfect place for it so that people, the future generations, can reflect on the history of Hong Kong. Not a park."

The performance received negative reactions although it has been considered as a significant artistic act demanding democracy. Artist and art critic Leung Po Shan Anthony argued that this act evoked fear among Hong Kong people of the Cultural Revolution and the prospect of future Communist rule. It was criticized as an "outdated act of resistance" by nationalism against colonialism, and it highlighted a "severe divergence" in the emotional fabric between the people of Mainland China and Hong Kong.
