= Statue of Sir Thomas Jackson, 1st Baronet =

Statue in Hong Kong

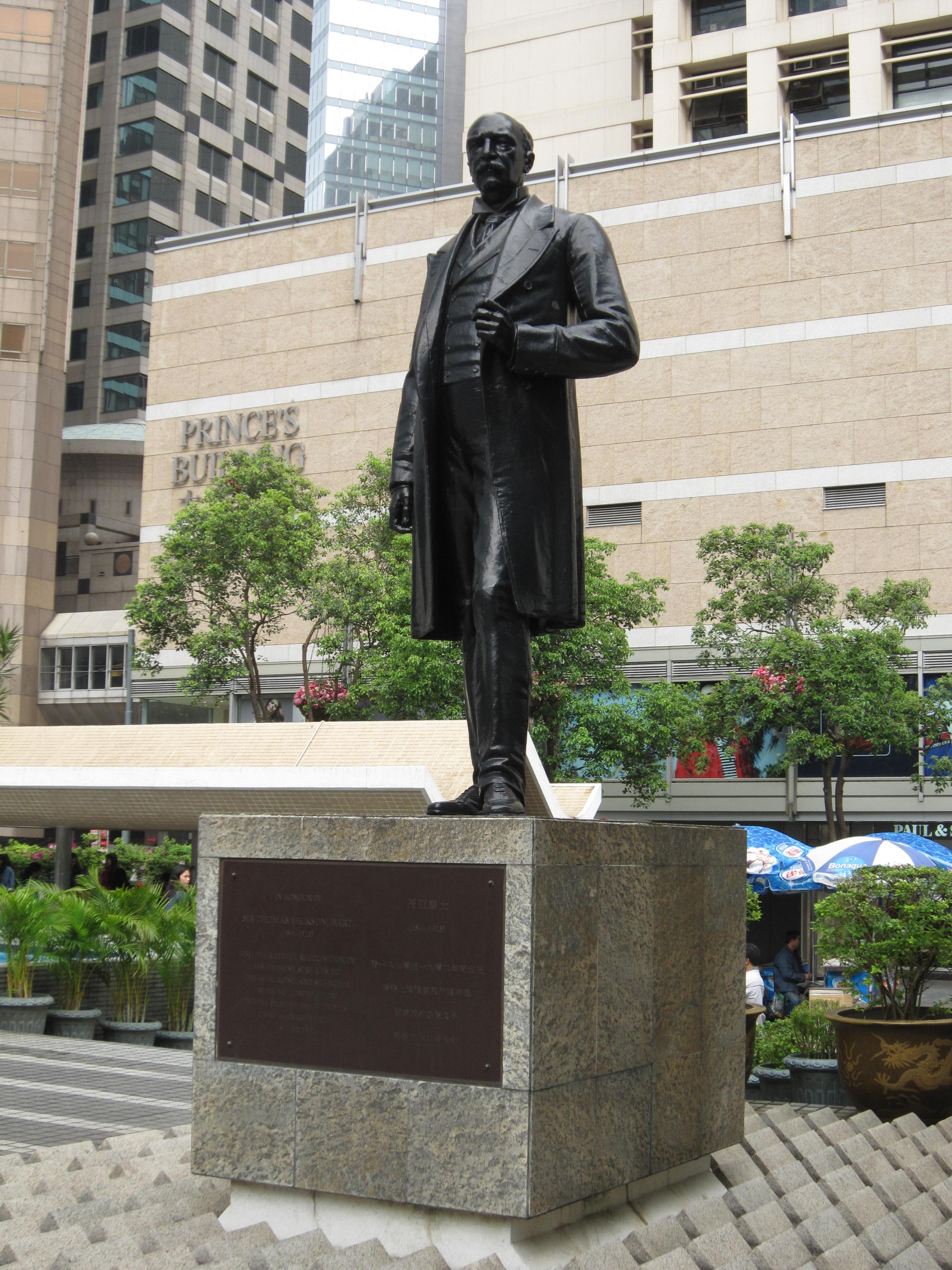
- Statue of Jackson on Statue Square, Hong Kong
- Artist: Mario Raggi
- Medium: Bronze sculpture
- Subject: Sir Thomas Jackson, 1st Baronet
- Location: Hong Kong

The statue of Sir Thomas Jackson, 1st Baronet, is a bronze sculpture by Mario Raggi, installed in Statue Square, a public pedestrian square in Central, Hong Kong. It was unveiled on 24 February 1906 by the governor of Hong Kong, Sir Matthew Nathan. At that time, the statue was facing the HSBC building.
