= Statue Square =

Square in Hong Kong

Coordinates: 22.28106°N 114.15974°E

- Public Square
- {{{other_names}}}
- 皇后像廣場
- Former name: Royal Square
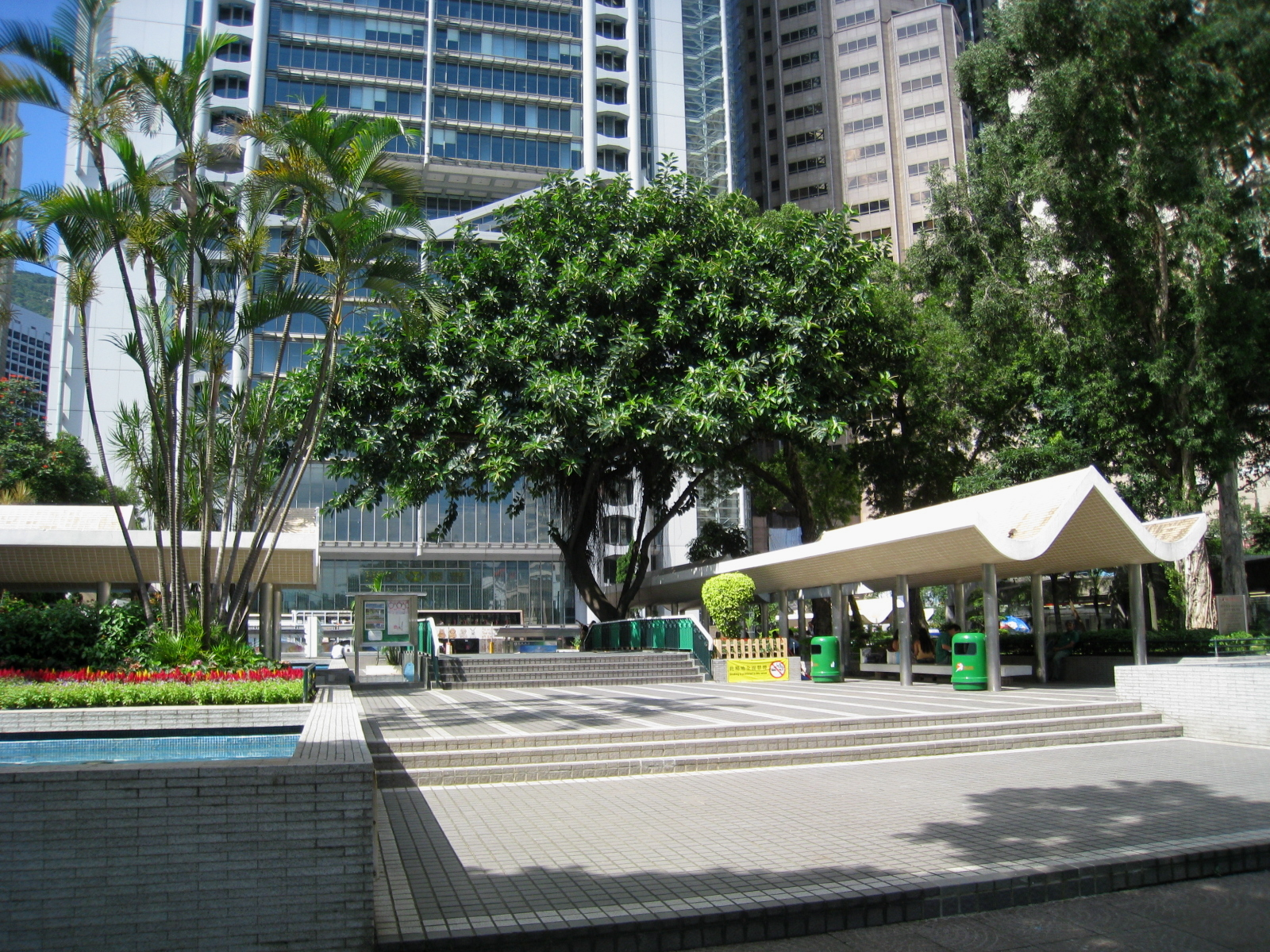
- Statue Square in June 2008, looking south toward the HSBC building.
- Completed: 19th century
- Location: Central, Hong Kong
- Interactive map of Statue Square

Statue Square
- Traditional Chinese: 皇后像廣場
- Simplified Chinese: 皇后像广场
Transcriptions
Standard Mandarin
- Hanyu Pinyin: Huánghòu Xiàng Guǎngchǎng
Yue: Cantonese
- Yale Romanization: Wòhng hauh jeuhng gwóng chèuhng
- Jyutping: Wong4 hau6 zoeng6 gwong2 cheong4

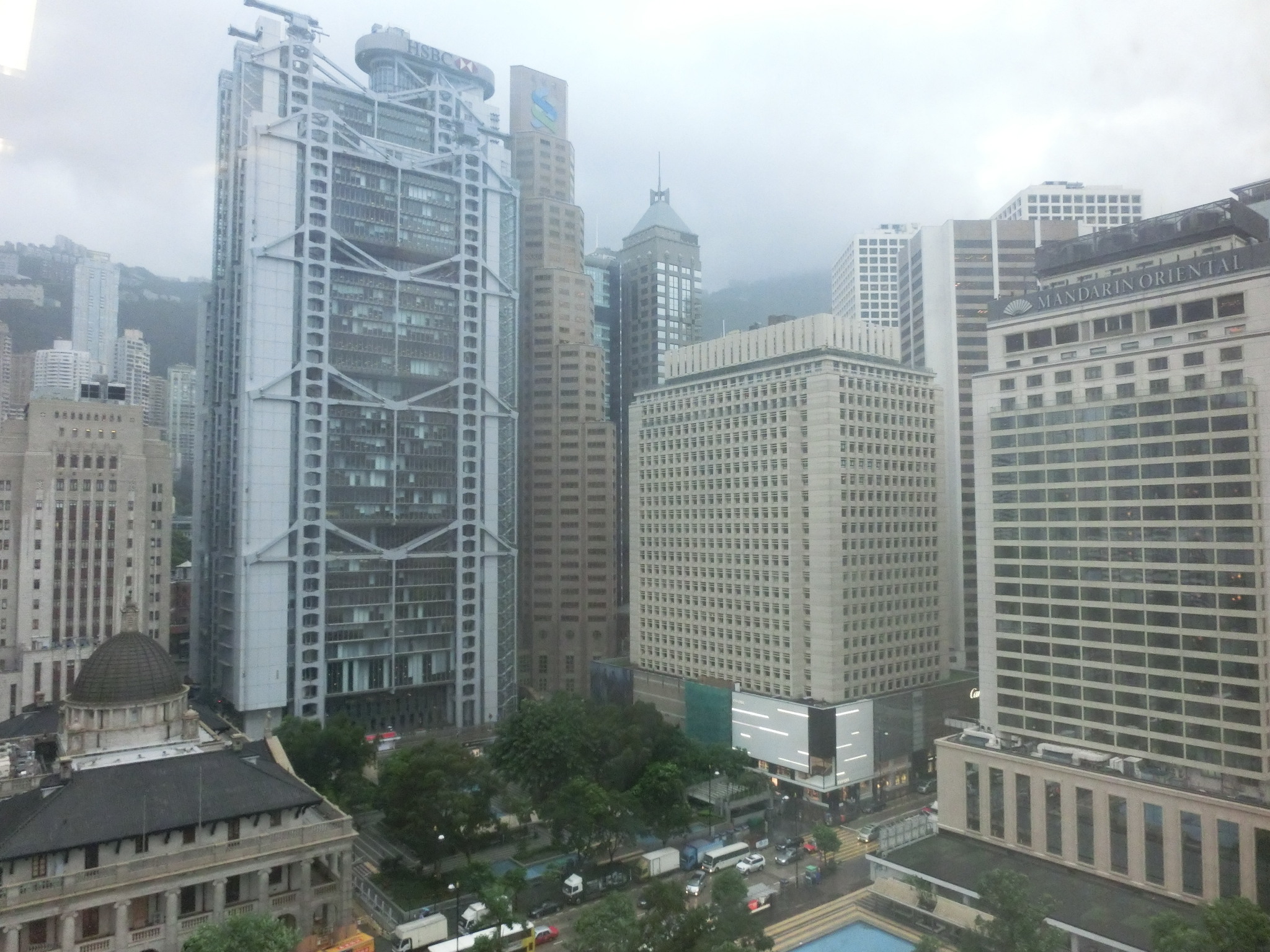
General view of Statue Square in August 2013. The large building overlooking the square is the HSBC Building (fourth design), completed in 1985.

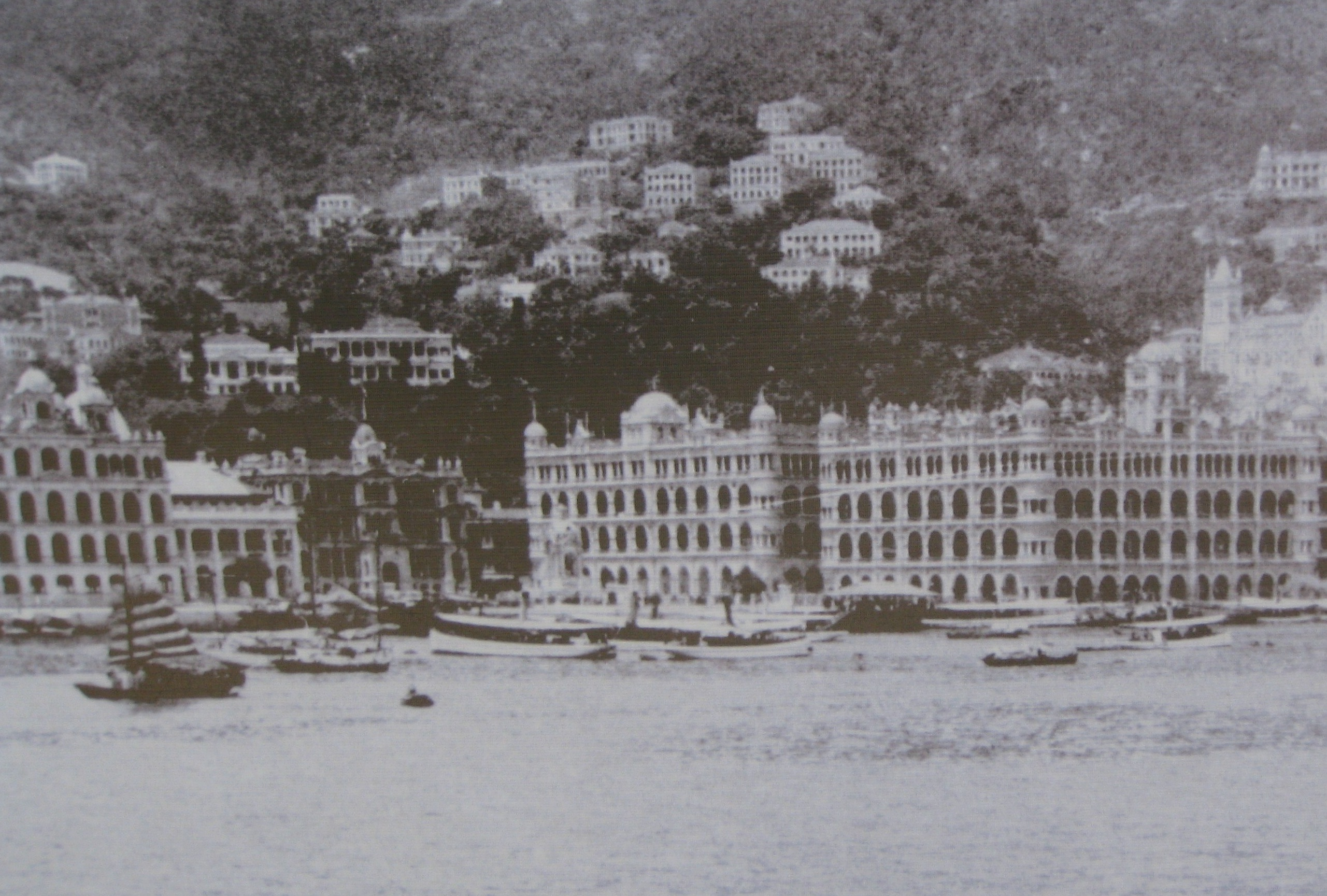
Statue Square in the 1910s, with HSBC building (second design). The old City Hall is hidden by the Legislative Council Building.

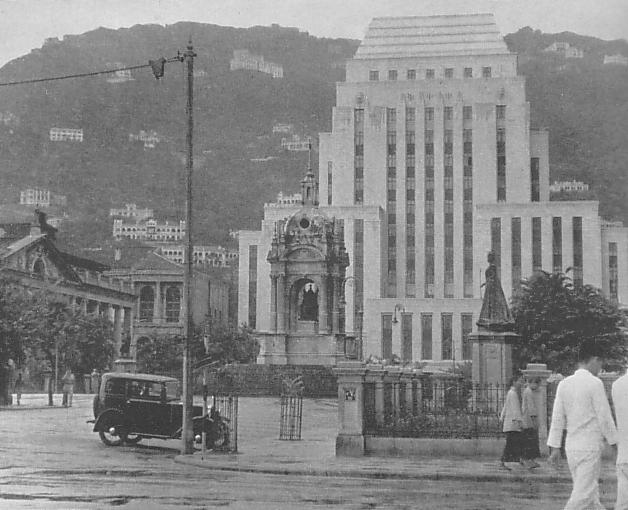
Statue Square in the 1930s, looking south toward the HSBC building (third design, built in 1935). The canopy of Queen Victoria's statue is visible.

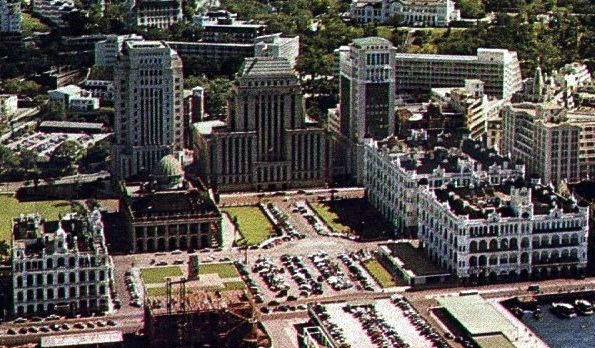
Statue Square in 1955. Prince's Building (first generation) and Queen's Building are visible on the right.

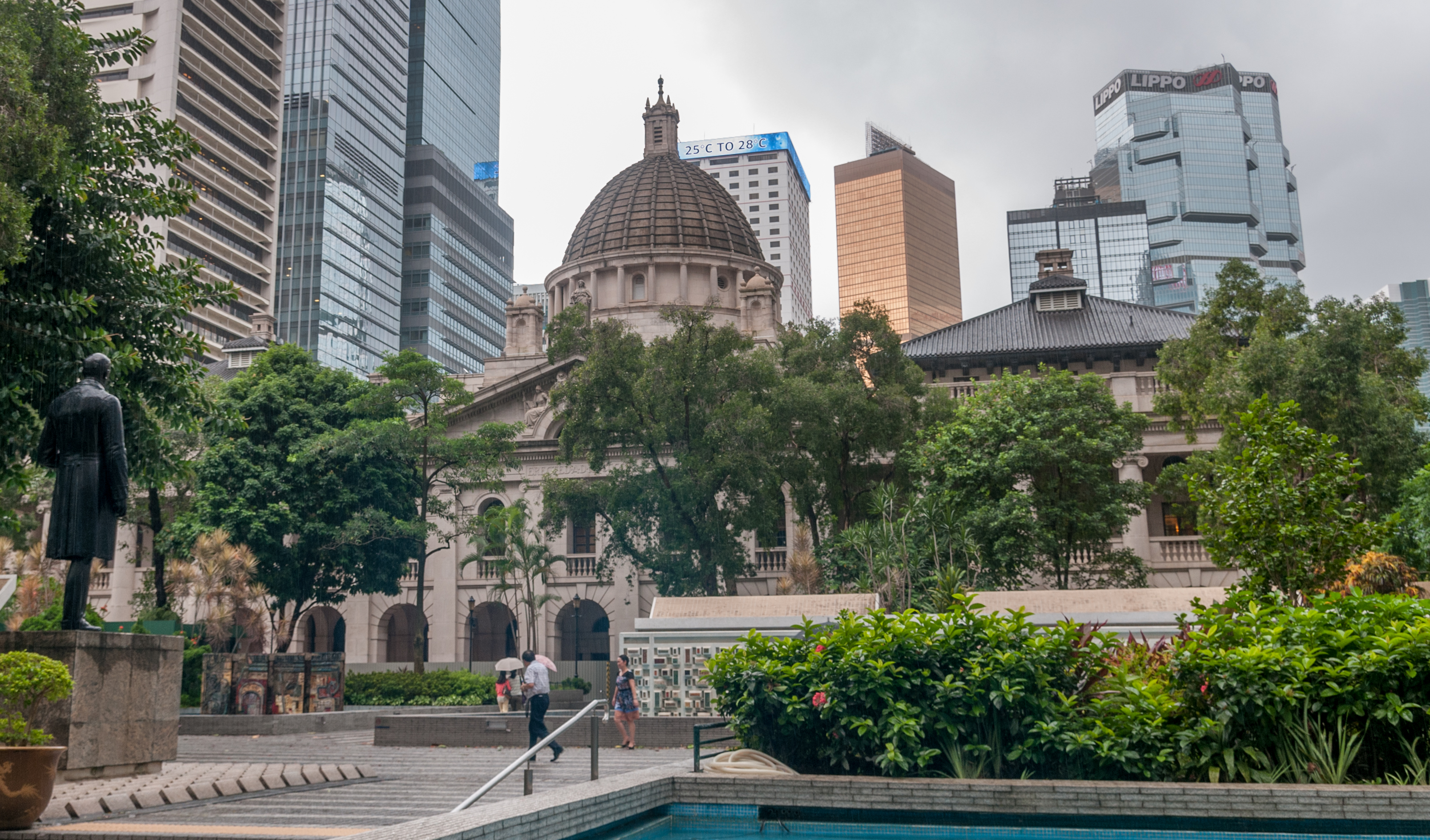
Statue Square façade of the Legislative Council Building in June 2013.

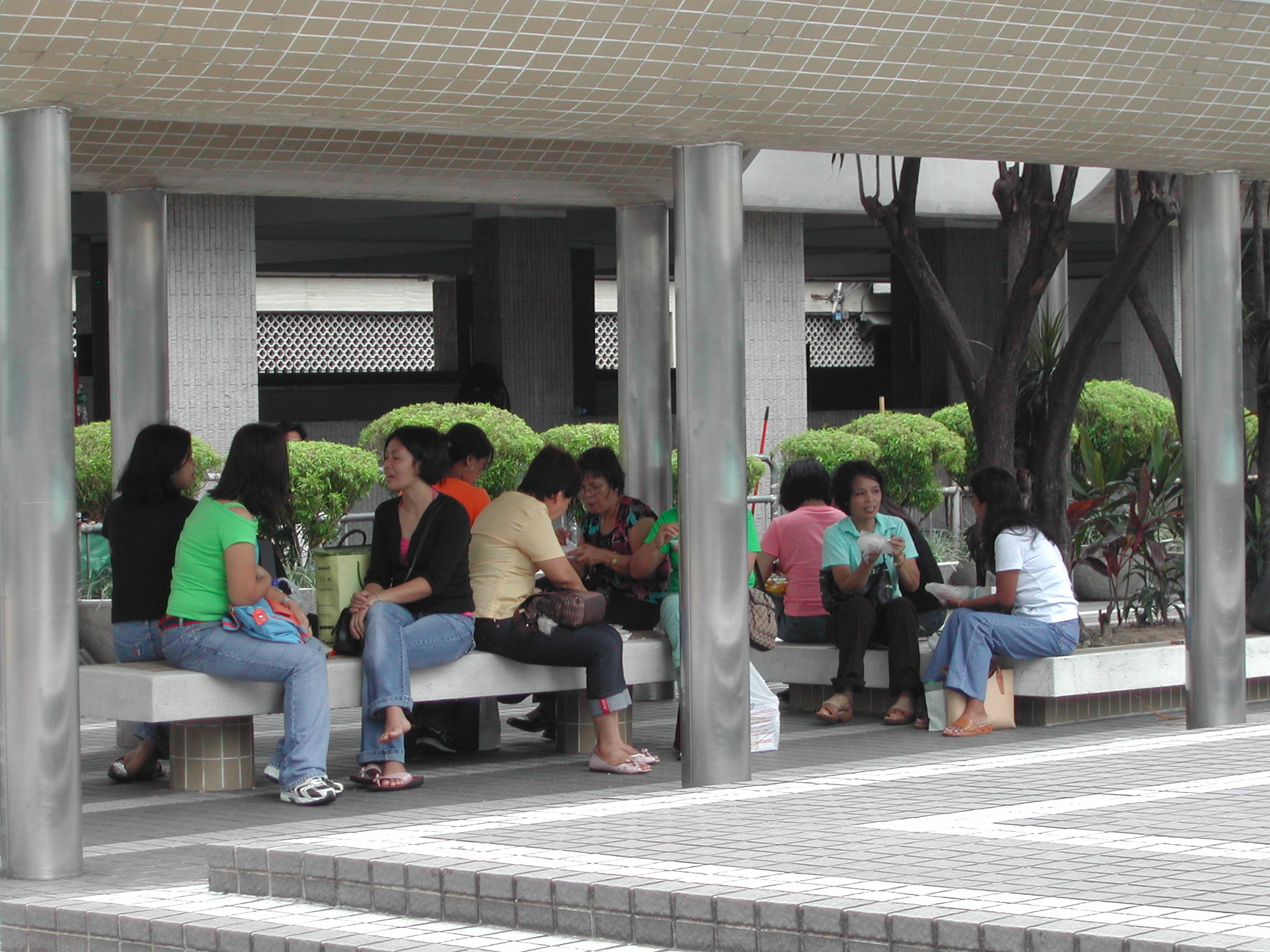
Statue Square is a rendezvous for numerous Filipino maids in Hong Kong on Sundays.

Statue Square (Chinese: 皇后像廣場; lit. "Empress' Statue Square") is a public pedestrian square in Central, Hong Kong. Built entirely on reclaimed land at the end of the 19th century, Statue Square consists of two parts separated by Chater Road into a northern and a southern section. It is bordered by Connaught Road Central in the north and by Des Voeux Road Central in the south.

The name is a reference to the statues, mainly of British royalty, which stood on the square until the Japanese occupation of Hong Kong during World War II. Today, the only statue on the square is the one of Sir Thomas Jackson, 1st Baronet, an early HSBC banker.

== History ==
The square was built at the end of the nineteenth century on land reclaimed by the Praya Reclamation Scheme. The idea of a square of statues dedicated to royalty was conceived by Sir Catchick Paul Chater. Initially named "Royal Square", it gradually became known as "Statue Square", as it originally contained the statue of Queen Victoria, in commemoration of the Queen's Golden Jubilee in 1887. The statue of the Queen should have been made not in bronze but in marble, an error that was not discovered until the bronze statue was almost completed. It was officially unveiled at the centre of the square on 28 May 1896, the day officially appointed for the celebration of the 77th birthday of the Queen.

A statue of Sir Thomas Jackson, 1st Baronet, the chief manager of the Hongkong and Shanghai Banking Corporation was unveiled in 1906. Apart from Jackson's statue and the two bronze lions in front of the HSBC building, the rest of the statues were displaced to Japan to be melted by the Japanese occupiers during World War II.

The Cenotaph, a replica of the Cenotaph in Whitehall, London, was unveiled on 24 May 1923 (Empire Day) by the Governor Sir Reginald Edward Stubbs. It was built on the northeastern section of Statue Square, facing the Hong Kong Club Building. This area is now only uncommonly referred to as part of Statue Square.

After the war, some of the statues were brought back to Hong Kong. Sir Thomas Jackson's now stands roughly in the middle of the square, facing the Court of Final Appeal Building. Queen Victoria's statue was placed in Victoria Park, and the two HSBC lions returned to the front of the HSBC building. The bronze statue of George V, also removed by the Japanese, was lost and never replaced after the war.

Since the 1980s, it has been a tradition for thousands of Filipina domestic workers to congregate in and around Statue Square every Sunday, their usual rest day of the week. A parallel tradition has since been developed in Victoria Park for Indonesian domestic helpers in Hong Kong.

== Surrounding buildings ==
South

The HSBC Hong Kong headquarters building is located along the southern side of the square, across Des Voeux Road Central. The site was previously occupied by the old City Hall (built 1869, demolished 1933) and smaller earlier generations of the HSBC Hong Kong headquarters building.

East

- Court of Final Appeal building, along the eastern side of the southern section of the square
- Hong Kong Club Building, along the eastern side of the northern section of the square

West

Several buildings with names reminiscent of British royalty were built on the western side of the square. Prince's Building and Queen's Building were built directly along the square (southern section and northern section respectively), while the others were built further west.

- Prince's Building 1904–1963, replaced by the current Prince's Building (1965)
- Queen's Building 1899–1961, replaced by the Mandarin Oriental, Hong Kong hotel (1963)
- King's Building 1905–1958, home to Marconi Wireless and now part of the footprint for Chater House
- St George's Building (聖佐治大廈) 1904–1966, home to Millington Limited and replaced by the current St. George's Building office tower (1969)
- Alexandra Building (亞歷山大行) 1904–1950, named for Princess of Wales, later Queen Alexandra, replaced by modernist Alexandra Building (1952–1974) and now Alexandra House (歷山大廈) (1976)

North

The square was initially bordered by Victoria Harbour on its northern side, but following land reclamation, it is now separated from it by Edinburgh Place, which housed the Star Ferry pier, among others, until 2007.

== The statues ==
Today, the only freestanding statue on the Square is the statue of Sir Thomas Jackson. Additionally, a 2.7 m high blind-folded statue of Themis, the Greek Goddess of Justice and Law, stands on top of the pediment of the Court of Final Appeal Building, and is facing the Square. The statues that have been historically on display on the square include:

- Statue of Queen Victoria. Unveiled on 28 May 1896. Taken by the Japanese during World War II and returned to Hong Kong in 1952. It is now in Victoria Park.
- Statue of Prince Albert, added before 1902.
- Statue of the Duke of Connaught. Donated by Catchick Paul Chater and erected in 1902. It was moved to the waterfront at Connaught Road Central and Pedder Street in 1907, near Blake Pier.
- Statue of Sir Thomas Jackson, 1st Baronet, the chief manager of the Hongkong and Shanghai Banking Corporation. Unveiled on 24 February 1906 by the Governor Sir Matthew Nathan.
- Statue of Edward VII. Bronze statue created by George Edward Wade. Donated by Catchick Paul Chater and unveiled on 6 February 1907 by the Duke of Connaught.
- Statue of the Prince of Wales who later became King George V. Donated by John Bell-Irving, a director of Hongkong Electric Company and unveiled on 6 February 1907 by the Duke of Connaught.
- Statue of Queen Alexandra. Bronze statue created by George Edward Wade. Unveiled on 25 November 1909. It was removed during the Japanese occupation.
- Statue of Mary of Teck, Princess of Wales and future Queen Mary. Bronze statue created by George Edward Wade. Donated by Hormusjee Naorojee Mody as "a genuine token of the loyalty and esteem of the Parsis for their King and Queen". Unveiled on 25 November 1909. It was removed during the Japanese occupation.
- Statue of Sir Henry May, 15th Governor of Hong Kong. Unveiled on 3 May 1923.
- The HSBC World War I memorial statue, "Fame". Unveiled on 24 May 1923.

In addition, statues of royalty and colonial administrators located outside of Statue Square included:

- Statue of Sir Arthur Kennedy, in the Botanical Gardens (picture). Erected by public subscription following his death at sea in 1883, it was unveiled in November 1887 by the newly arrived Governor William Des Vœux and stood "above the second terrace looking down on the fountain". It was removed during the Japanese occupation, and never recovered.
- Statue of King George VI, in Hong Kong Zoological and Botanical Gardens. Erected in 1941 and still standing.

== In popular culture ==
This location was the "Pit Stop" for the tenth episode of The Amazing Race 17.

== Gallery ==
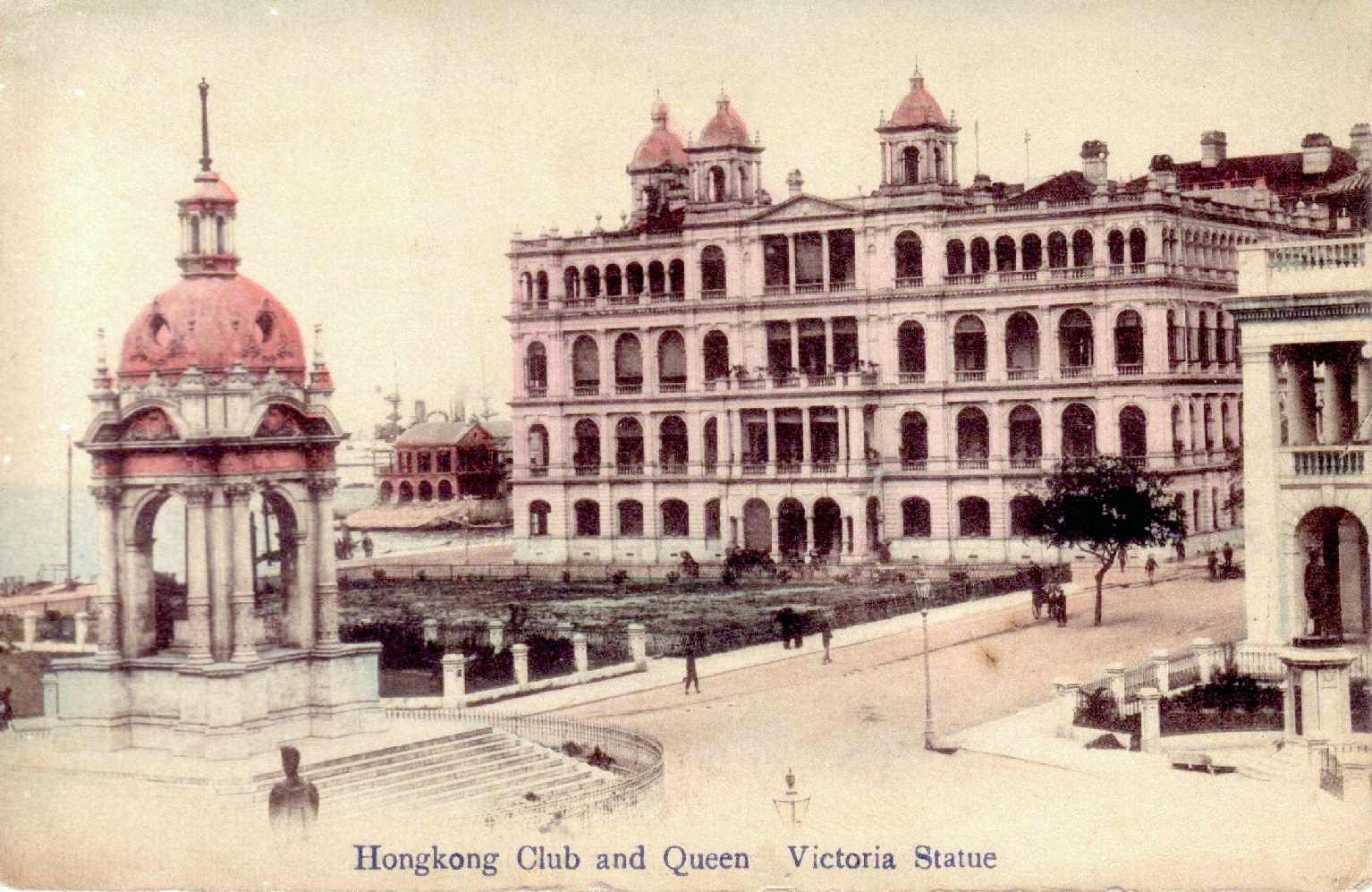
Statue of Queen Victoria and its canopy at its original location in 1905.

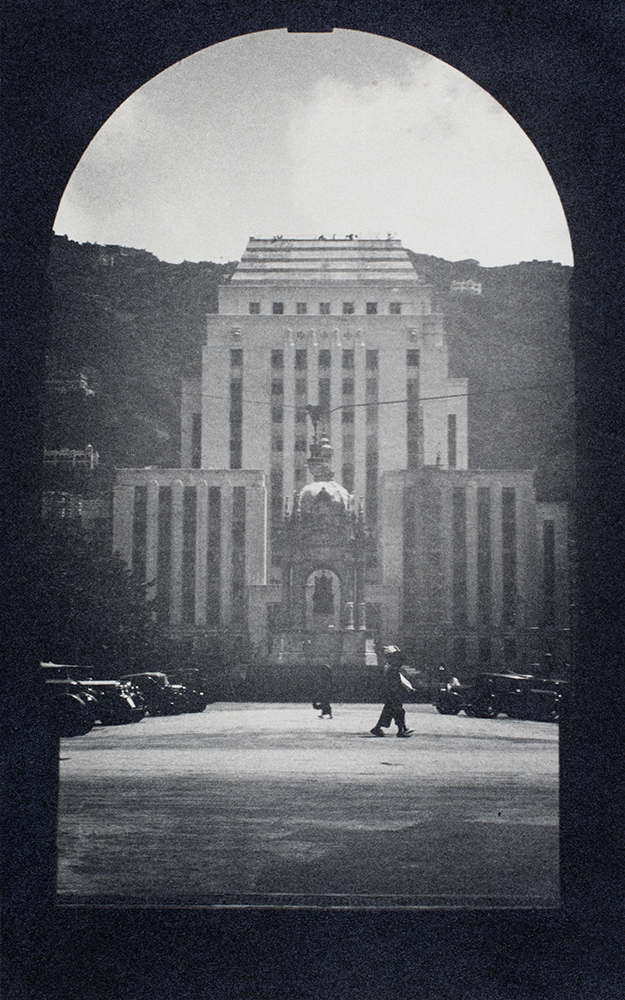
A black and white photo shows a statue of Queen Victoria in front of the HSBC Building, Hong Kong in the 1930s.

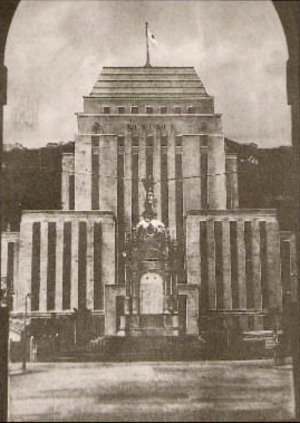
Sealed canopy during the Japanese occupation.

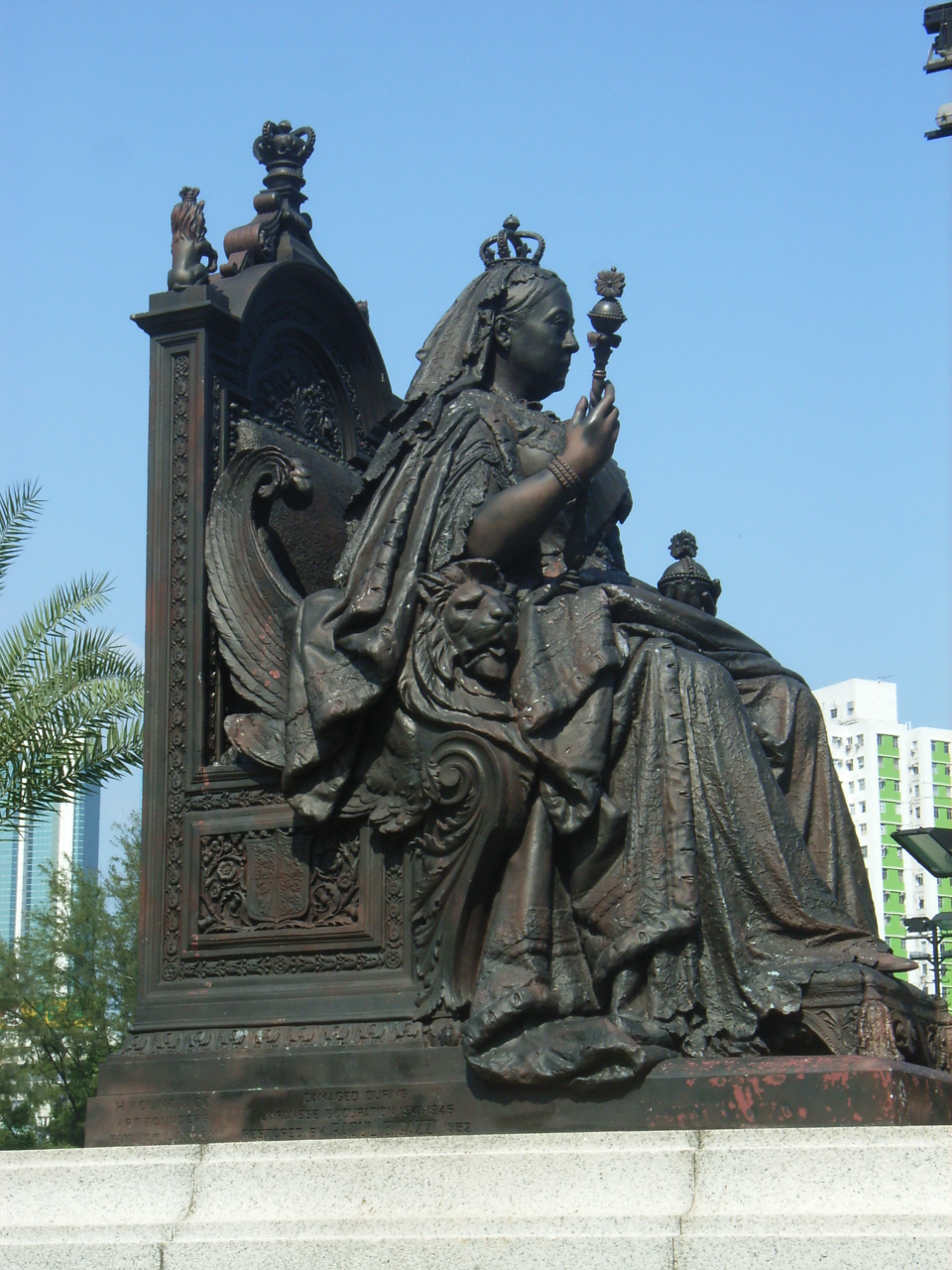
Statue of Queen Victoria in Victoria Park in October 2006.

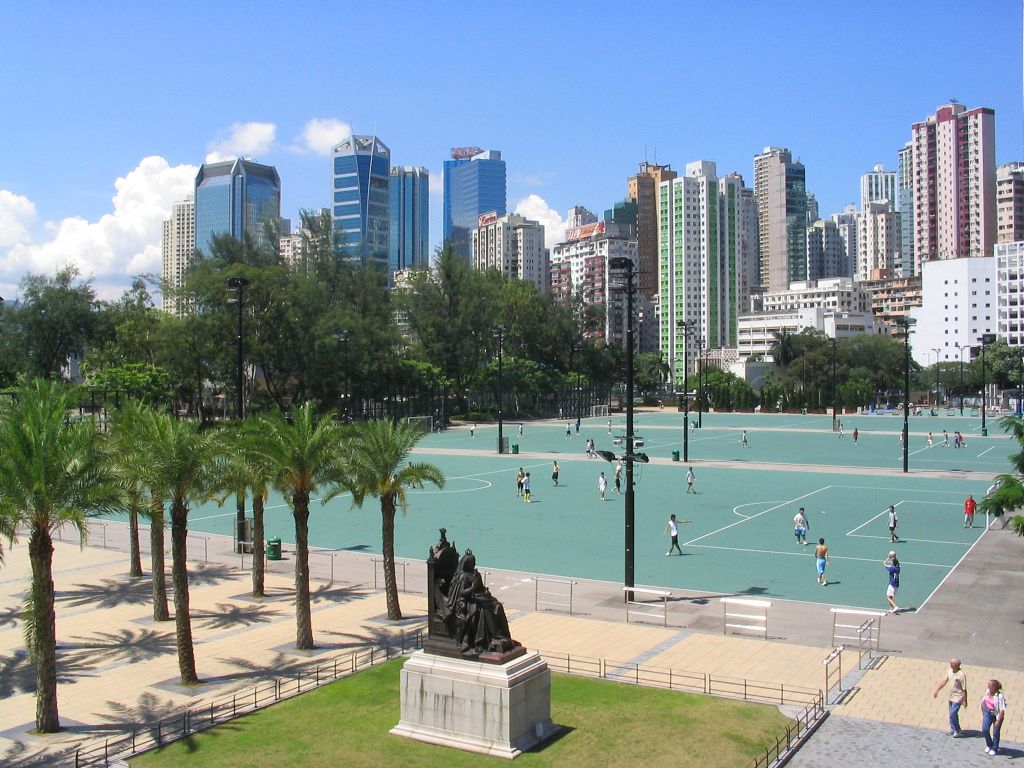
The relocated statue of Queen Victoria in Victoria Park in June 2006.

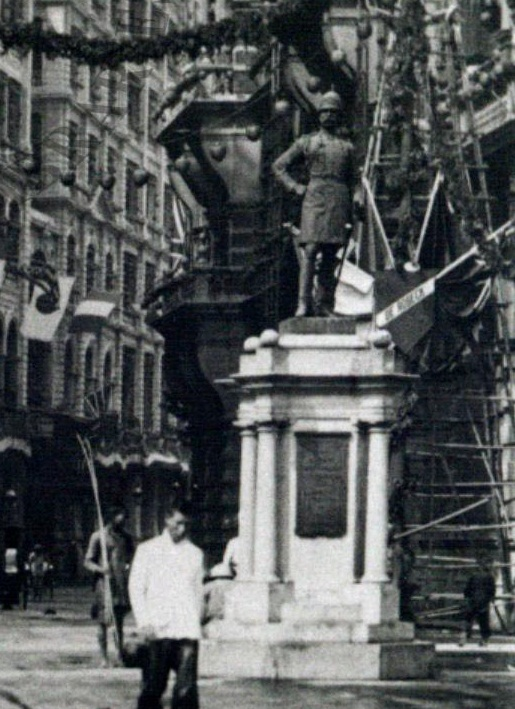
Statue of the Duke of Connaught at the end of Pedder Street in 1919.

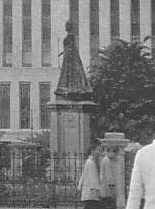
Statue of Queen Alexandra in the 1930s.

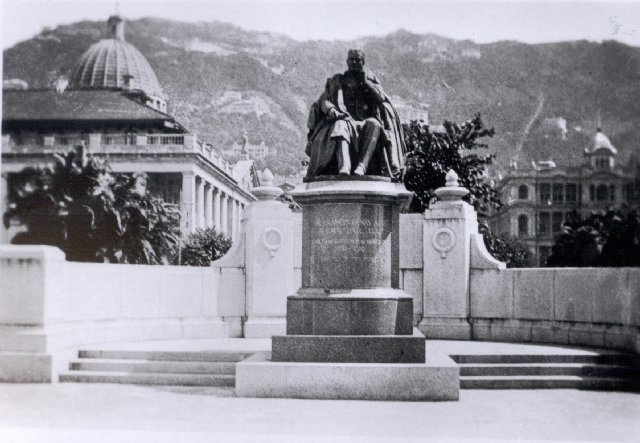
Statue of Sir Henry May c. 1930.

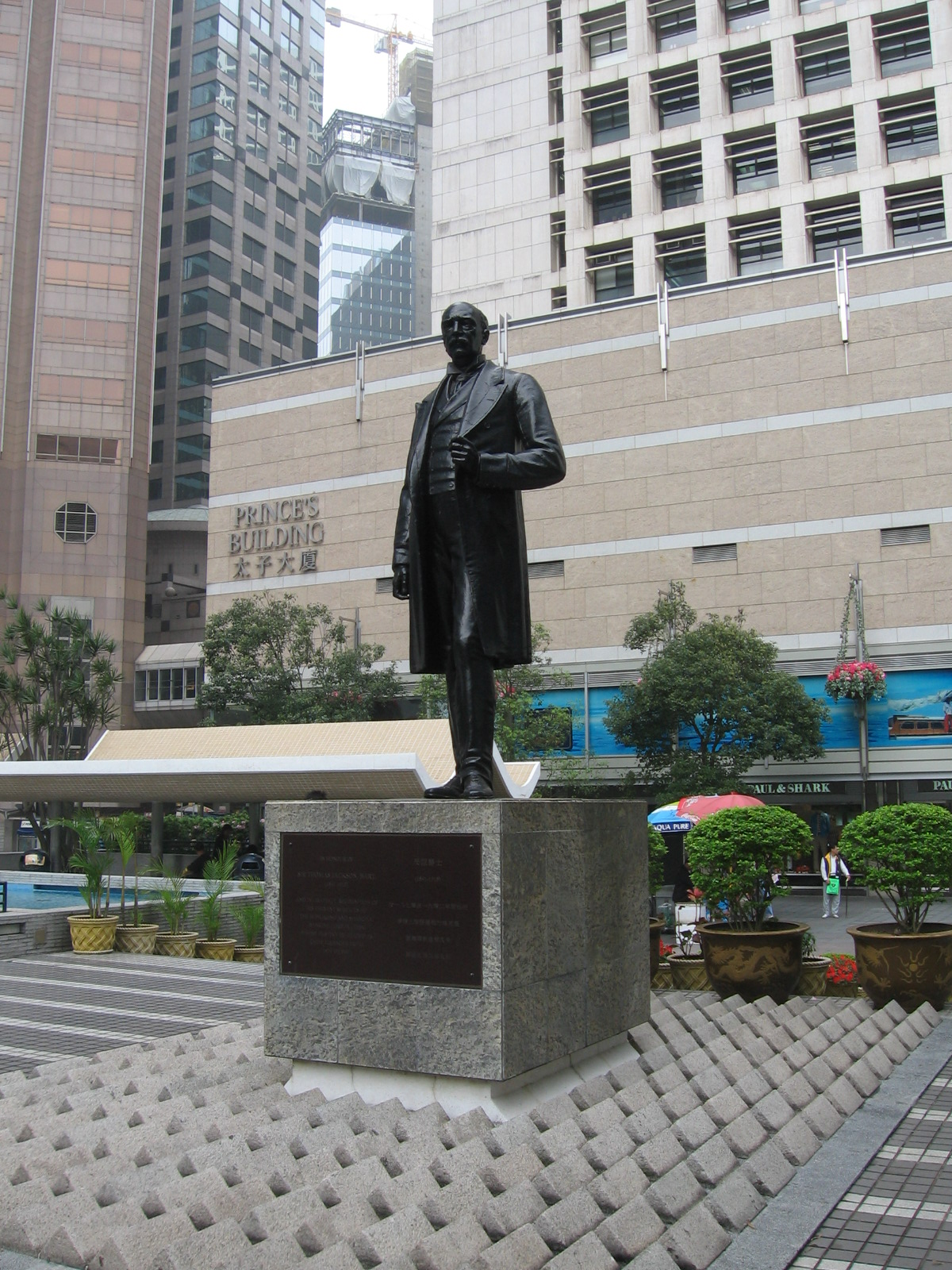
Statue of Sir Thomas Jackson, 1st Baronet, with Prince's Building in the background, in March 2006.

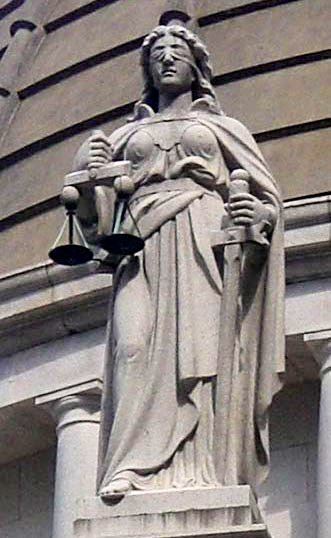
Statue of Themis on the Legislative Council Building.

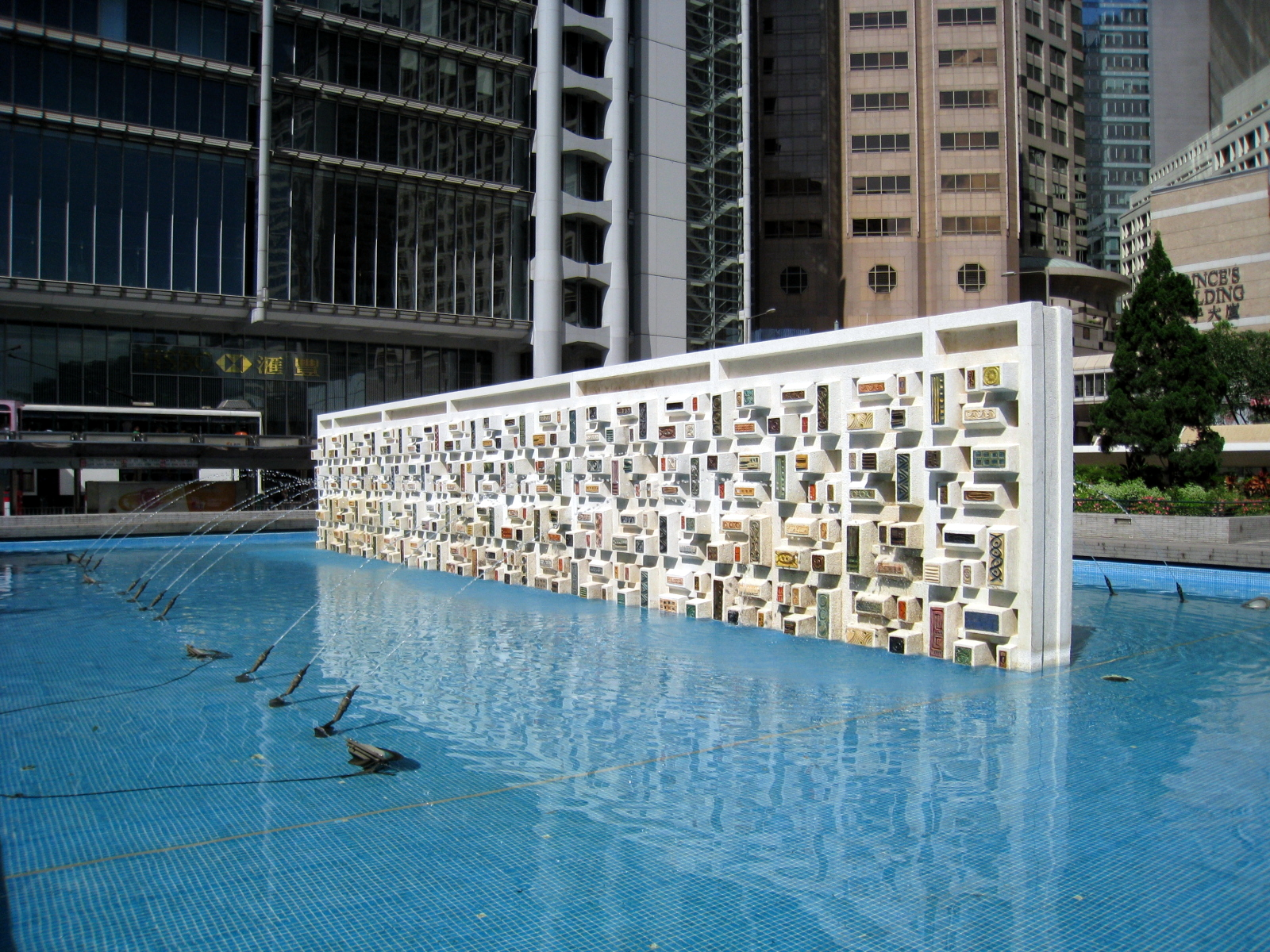
One of the water fountains on Statue Square, in June 2008.

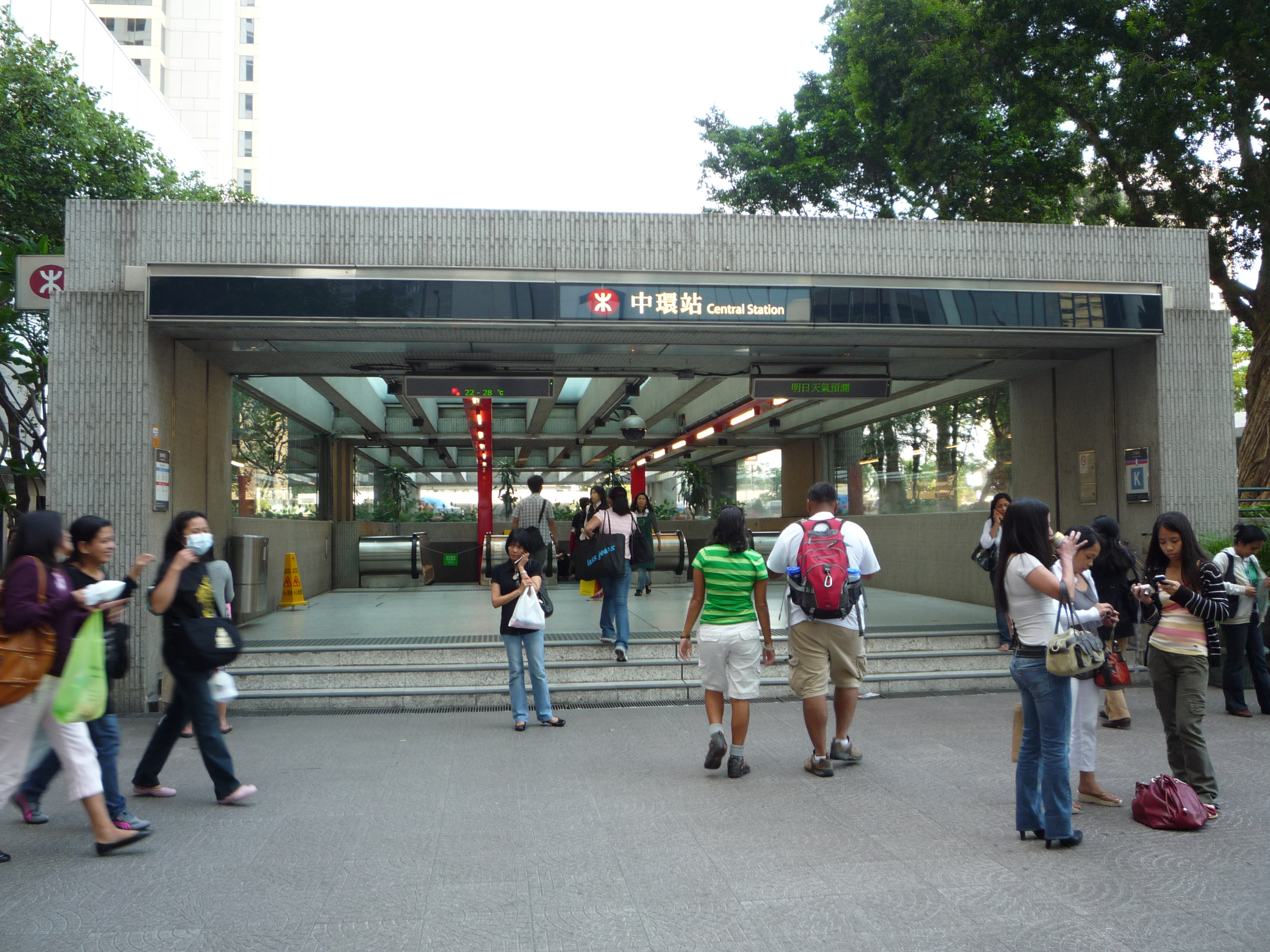
Central MTR station Exit K in May 2009.

== See also ==
- History of Hong Kong
- List of urban public parks and gardens of Hong Kong
- Morse Park, named after an HSBC banker Arthur Morse
