= Sir Thomas Jackson, 1st Baronet =

British baronet (1841–1915)

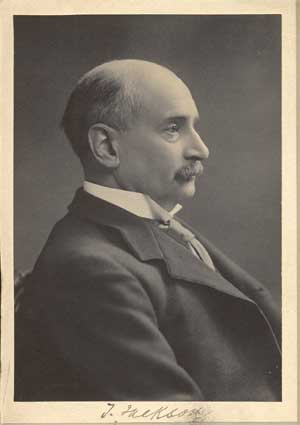

Sir Thomas Jackson, 1st Baronet, (Chinese: 昃臣; 1841 – 1915) was an Irish bank manager who was the third chief manager of The Hongkong and Shanghai Banking Corporation. He was responsible for financing the development of colonial Hong Kong under the first large scale bank.

== Early years ==
Sir Thomas Jackson was born on 4 June 1841 in Carrigallen, County Leitrim, Ireland, the second of six sons of David and Elizabeth Jackson. He spent his childhood in Crossmaglen, County Armagh, and, in 1860, joined the Belfast Branch of the Bank of Ireland. Jackson travelled to Hong Kong in 1864 to join the Agra and Masterbank.

In 1864, the foundation of the Hong Kong & Shanghai Banking Corporation ("HSBC") building was being developed.

Jackson joined the bank in 1865, a year after its opening and served terms as accountant in Shanghai and then from 1870 to 1874 as manager in Yokohama.

== Achievements ==
In 1876, after only ten years' service in the bank and at the early age of 35, Jackson was appointed the chief manager of HSBC.

He held this title, the most senior executive position in the bank, with only short breaks, until 1902. Between April 1886 and September 1887, and again for a year in 1889, and between 1891 and 1893, he relinquished the role to return to the United Kingdom where he took charge of the London office of the bank.

Under his business leadership the bank became the premiere bank in Asia. His influence was such that he came to be called the bank's "Great Architect". Brilliant, though also cautious, he also had the nickname "Lucky Jackson", which probably reflected more his innate intuition as when to act quickly and boldly.

It was announced that he would receive a baronetcy in the 1902 Coronation Honours list published on 26 June 1902 for the (subsequently postponed) coronation of King Edward VII, and, on 24 July 1902, he was created a Baronet, of Stansted House, in the parish of Stansted, in the county of Essex.

This entitled him to use the prenominal "Sir" combined with the postnominal abbreviation of "Bart.", which in modern-day usage is further abbreviated to "Bt."

== Legacy ==
In recognition of his services to the bank and Hong Kong, in February 1906 a statue of Jackson was unveiled in Statue Square in front of the bank's Hong Kong premises by the colony's governor, Sir Matthew Nathan. The statue remains to this day. Jackson is commemorated in his native Ireland in a stained glass window in Creggan Anglican church, County Armagh.

Business positions
Preceded by James Greig	Chief Manager of the Hongkong and Shanghai Banking Corporation; 1876–1886	Succeeded by John Walter
Preceded by John Walter	Chief Manager of the Hongkong and Shanghai Banking Corporation; 1887–1889	Succeeded by G. E. Noble
Preceded by G. E. Noble	Chief Manager of the Hongkong and Shanghai Banking Corporation; 1890–1891	Succeeded by F. de Bovis
Preceded by F. de Bovis	Chief Manager of the Hongkong and Shanghai Banking Corporation; 1893–1902	Succeeded by R. M. Smith
Legislative Council of Hong Kong
New seat	Unofficial Member; Representative for Hong Kong General Chamber of Commerce; 1884–1886	Succeeded by A. P. MacEwen
Baronetage of the United Kingdom
New creation	Baronet (of Stansted House); 1902–1915	Succeeded by Thomas Jackson
