= Hong Kong Flower Show =

Annual flower show

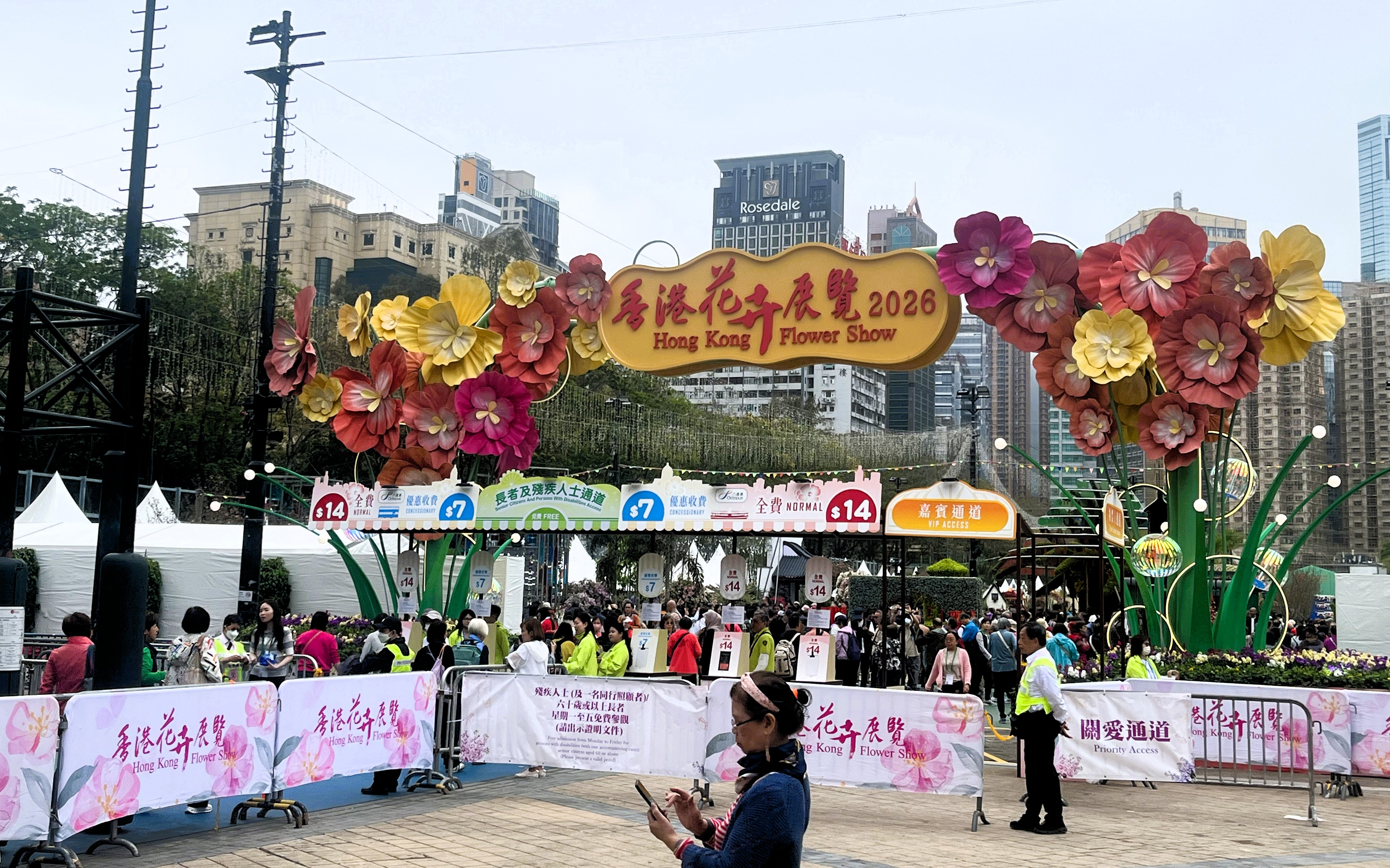
The entrance to the 2026 Hong Kong Flower Show

Hong Kong Flower Show (Chinese: 香港花卉展覽) is an annual exhibition presented by the Leisure and Cultural Services Department (LCSD) of Hong Kong. It is held every March in Victoria Park.

From 1968 to 1986, the Urban Council held an Annual Urban Council Flower Show at City Hall, while the Regional Council held the North District Flower Show. In May 1986, the Urban Council and Regional Council decided to have a joint annual flower show, and so in 1987, the first Hong Kong Flower Show was held in Sha Tin Central Park. After that, the flower show was jointly organised by the Urban Council and the Regional Council, with the location alternating between Victoria Park and Sha Tin Central Park. In 2000, the Hong Kong government decided to change the organizer to the newly-established LCSD and the location was fixed to be Victoria Park.

== Theme and Featured Flower in Past Years ==
Theme and Featured Flower in Past Years
Year	Featured Flower	Theme
2002	Garden Petunia	Hong Kong in Full Blossom
2003	Phalaenopsis	Orchid Splendour
2004	Pansy	Pansy Fantasia
2005	Rhododendron	Whisper of Spring
2006	Dianthus	Enchanting Beauty
2007	Geranium	Spring Blossoms for Celebration
2008	Gerbera	Vibrant Blossoms for Beijing Olympics
2009	Cosmos	Blossoming Welcome for the East Asian Games
2010	Cineraria	Fairy Tales of Flowers
2011	Primula	Symphony of Spring Flowers
2012	Hyacinth	Floral Delights
2013	Dendrobium	Kaleidoscope of Spring
2014	Kalanchoe	Blossoms of Joy
2015	Oncidium	When Blossoms Dance
2016	Antirrhinum Majus	Blossoms in Vivid Art 2016
2017	Rose	Blossoms of Love
2018	Dahlia	Joy in Bloom
2019	Chinese Hibiscus	When Dreams Blossom
2020	The physical Hong Kong Flower Show of 2020 was cancelled due to the COVID-19 pandemic in Hong Kong.	
2021	Rhododendron (Note: The physical Hong Kong Flower Show of 2021 was cancelled due to the COVID-19 pandemic in Hong Kong and was changed to an online flower show.)	City of Flowers, City of Love
2022	The physical Hong Kong Flower Show of 2022 was cancelled due to the COVID-19 pandemic in Hong Kong.	
2023	Hydrangea	Bliss in Bloom
2024	Angelonia	Floral Joy Around Town
2025	Cosmos	Ablaze with Glory
2026	Stock	A Fragrant Journey through Hong Kong
