= Victoria Park (Hong Kong) =

Public park in Hong Kong

- 維多利亞公園
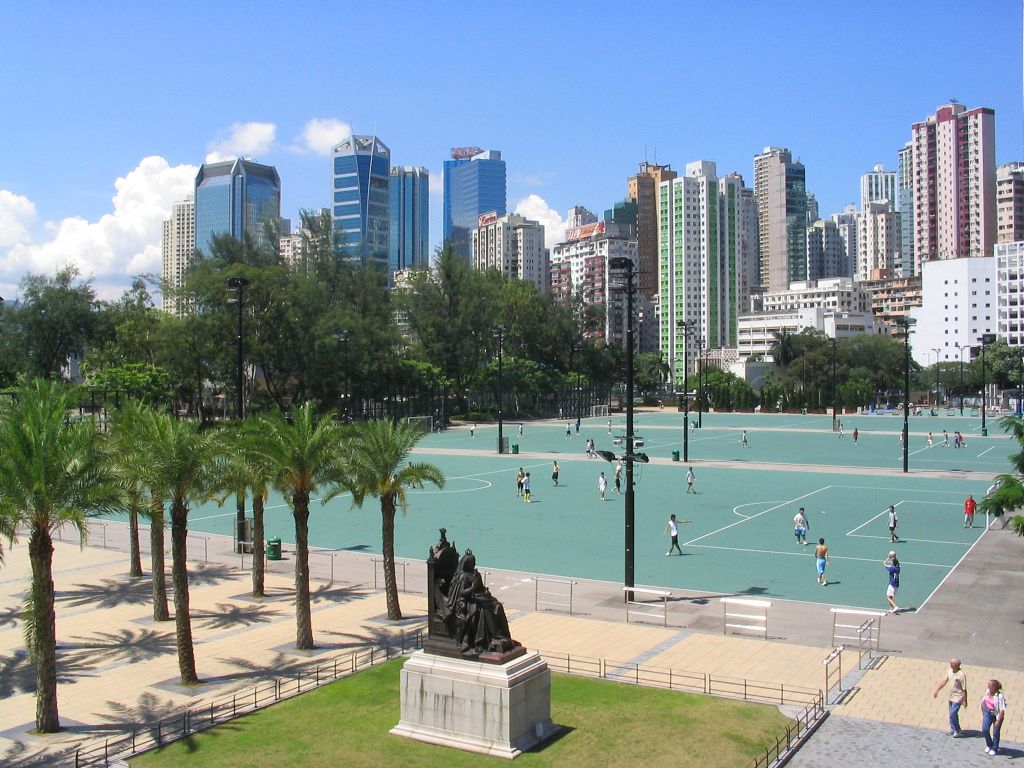
- General view of the park

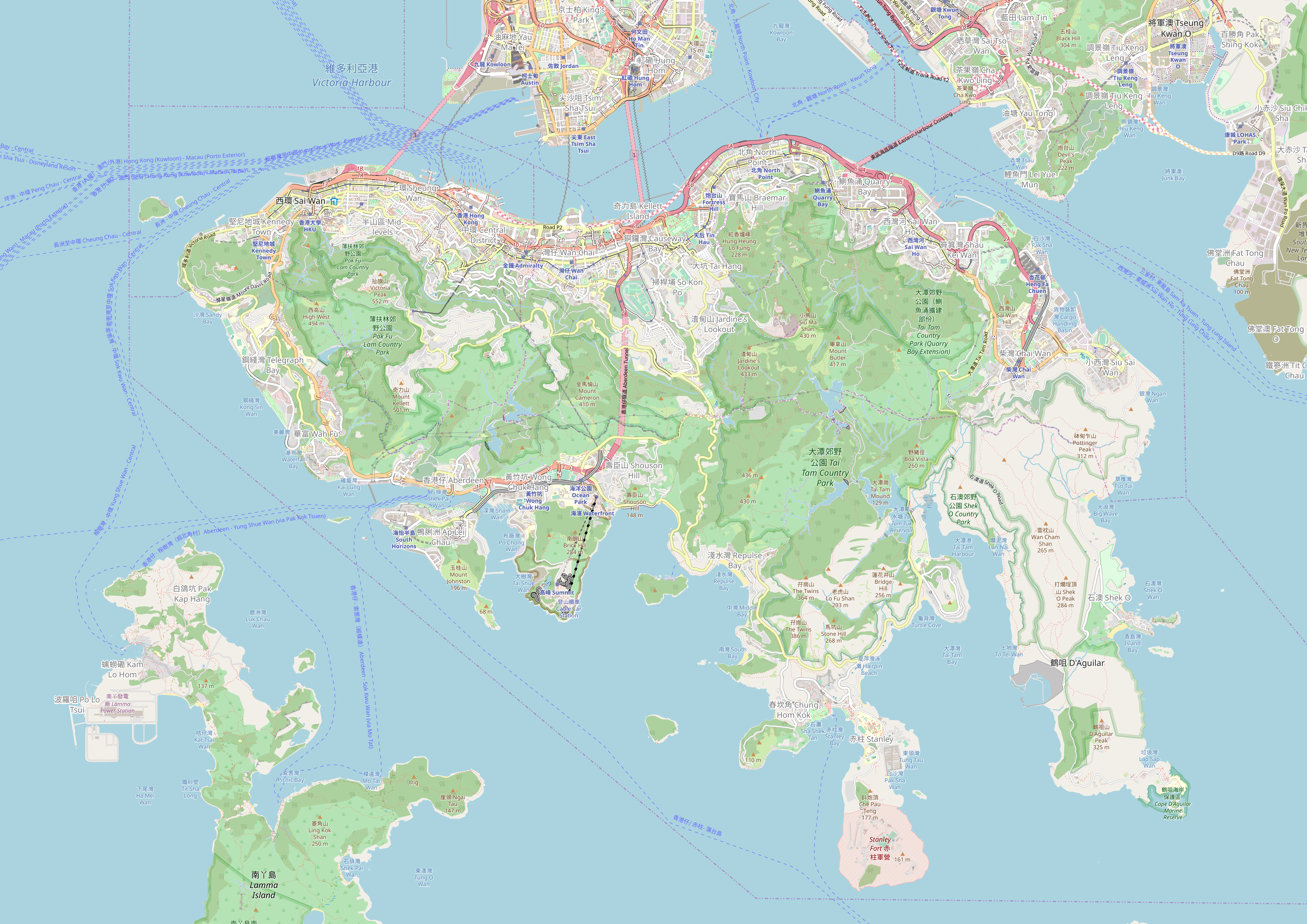
- Location within Hong Kong Island
- Type: Urban park
- Location: 1 Hing Fat Street, Causeway Bay, Hong Kong Island
- Coordinates: 22°16′55″N 114°11′17″E
- Area: 19 hectares (47 acres)
- Opened: October 1957; 69 years ago
- Manager: Leisure and Cultural Services Department
- Status: Open all year
- Website: www.lcsd.gov.hk

Chinese name
- Traditional Chinese: 維多利亞公園
- Simplified Chinese: 维多利亚公园
Transcriptions
Standard Mandarin
- Hanyu Pinyin: Wéiduōlìyà Gōngyuán
- IPA: [wěɪtwólîjâ kʊ́ŋɥɛ̌n]
Yue: Cantonese
- Yale Romanization: Wàihdōleih'a Gūngyùhn
- Jyutping: Wai4 do1 lei6 aa3 Gung1 jyun4
- IPA: [wɐ̏itɔ́ːlèiāː kʊ́ŋjy̏ːn]

Victoria Park (Chinese: 維多利亞公園; Cantonese Yale: Wàihdōleih'a Gūng'yún) is a public park in Causeway Bay, Wan Chai District, Hong Kong. The park is named after Queen Victoria, who has a statue in the park. It is around 190,000 square metres (19 ha) in size, and contains sports facilities for tennis, association football, basketball, handball, volleyball, swimming, jogging, fitness, rollerskating, and bowls.

The park first opened to the public in October 1957, and was revamped in the early 2000s. Owned and operated by the Leisure and Cultural Services Department of Hong Kong, the park is open all year, free of admission charge. It is Hong Kong's most popular public park, attracting more visitors annually than Hong Kong Park and Kowloon Park combined.

== Site ==
Victoria Park is located on Hong Kong Island, in the Causeway Bay area of Wan Chai District. It is situated on the shore of Causeway Bay typhoon shelter, and separated by a breakwater from Victoria Harbour. The park is bounded by Causeway Road to the southeast, Gloucester Road to the west, Victoria Park Road and Island Eastern Corridor to the north, and Hing Fat Street to the east.

The park is bordered to the south by the Hong Kong Central Library and the Regal Hongkong Hotel; to the east by the Park Towers residential complex; to the north by a fire station and the Citicorp Centre office tower; and to the west by Windsor House shopping mall and The Park Lane Hong Kong hotel. A small square, Tung Lo Wan Garden, is located in the north-western portion of Victoria Park.

== History ==
Previously, the park's location served as a typhoon shelter – known as Causeway Bay Typhoon Shelter – used by small fishing boats and yachts during typhoon seasons. In the 1950s, the former bay was filled in, the shoreline was pushed north, and the government decided to create a public park on the newly reclaimed land. A new typhoon shelter was built north of the park.

In 1955, a statue of Queen Victoria was moved to the park. The statue was cast in Pimlico, London, towards the end of the nineteenth century, and subsequently erected in Hong Kong's Central District. It was transferred to Japan to be melted down during the Japanese occupation, but was retrieved in the aftermath of World War II, and was restored before being placed in the park. The park officially opened in October 1957. In 1972, embankments in the park's northern half were completed in conjunction with the construction of the Cross-Harbour Tunnel, and the Victoria Park Road was paved.

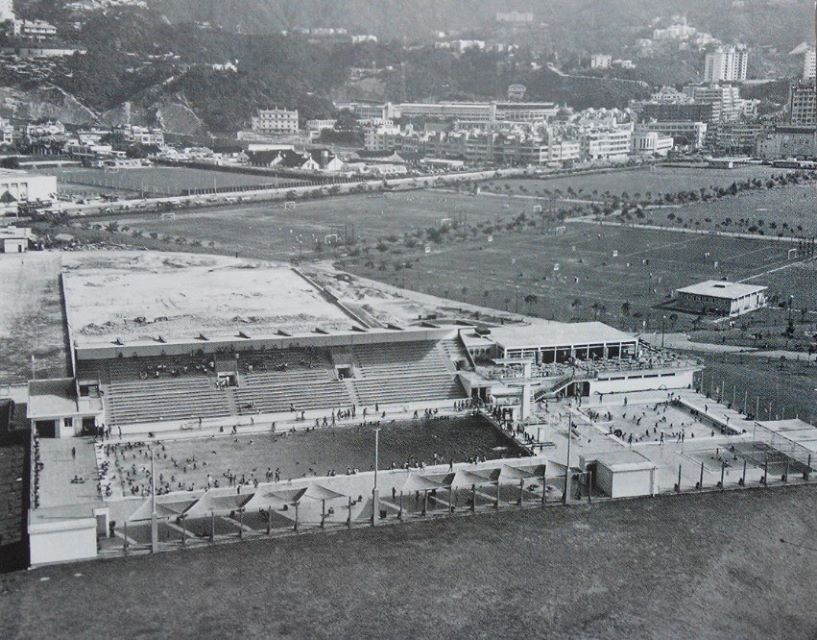
The park's swimming pool in 1957

A central lawn was laid in the park in 1974, and a tennis court was built in 1981. In 1984, an overpass of the Island Eastern Corridor was built along Victoria Park Road, connecting Causeway Bay with the Tai Koo Shing estate. In September 1996, Pun Sing-lui (a Mainland Chinese performance artist) painted the statue of Queen Victoria crimson, and bent its nose with a hammer in protest over Hong Kong's "dull, colonial culture". The nose of the statue was rebuilt at a cost of HK$150,000, and Pun was sentenced to 28 days in prison.

Between 2000 to 2002, the park underwent a major renovation which saw many sports facilities built on the site. The park's popularity increased after the revamp, especially among Indonesian domestic workers, as Sugar Street (which is adjacent to the park) is home to numerous Indonesian food, spice, book, magazine, and music shops.

In 2013, a modern indoor swimming complex was built on the site of the old outdoor pools. The following year, work began on the construction of a slip road for the Central–Wan Chai Bypass, located in the northern end of the park, sparking public outcry. This was highly controversial, as local councillors and residents alleged they had not been informed that the road would cut through the park. In March 2015, construction works unearthed unexploded ordnance dating from World War II, and the Explosive Ordnance Disposal Bureau of the Hong Kong Police Force was called in to dispose of it.

== Features ==
Victoria Park
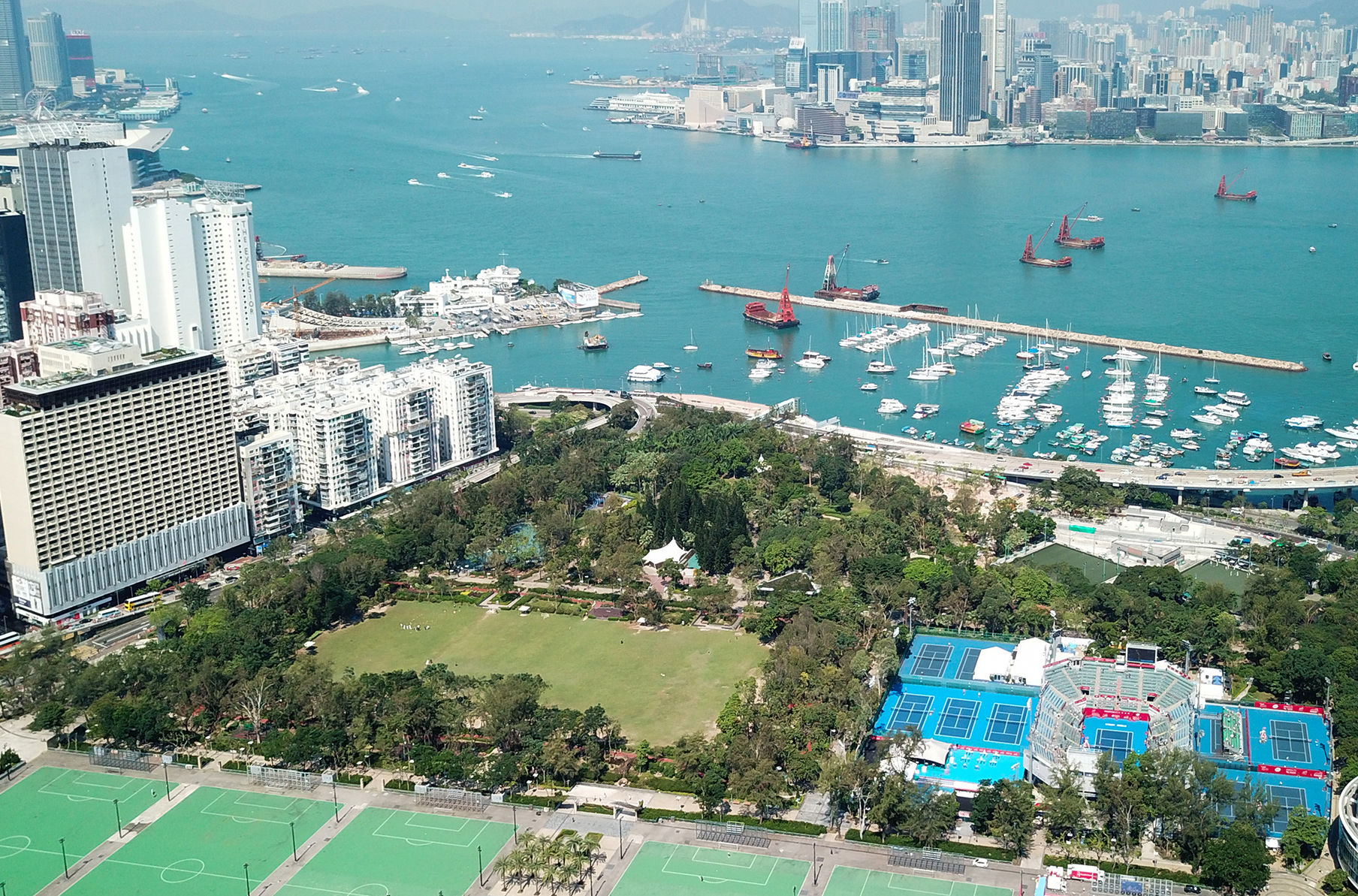
- Interactive map of Victoria Park
- Location: Hong Kong
- Capacity: 3,600 (Central Court)
- Surface: Hard, outdoors

Construction
- Groundbreaking: 1980
- Built: 1981
- Opened: 1981

Tenants
- Hong Kong Open WTA (Tennis) (2014–present); Hong Kong 125 Open (2024 – present)

=== Facilities ===
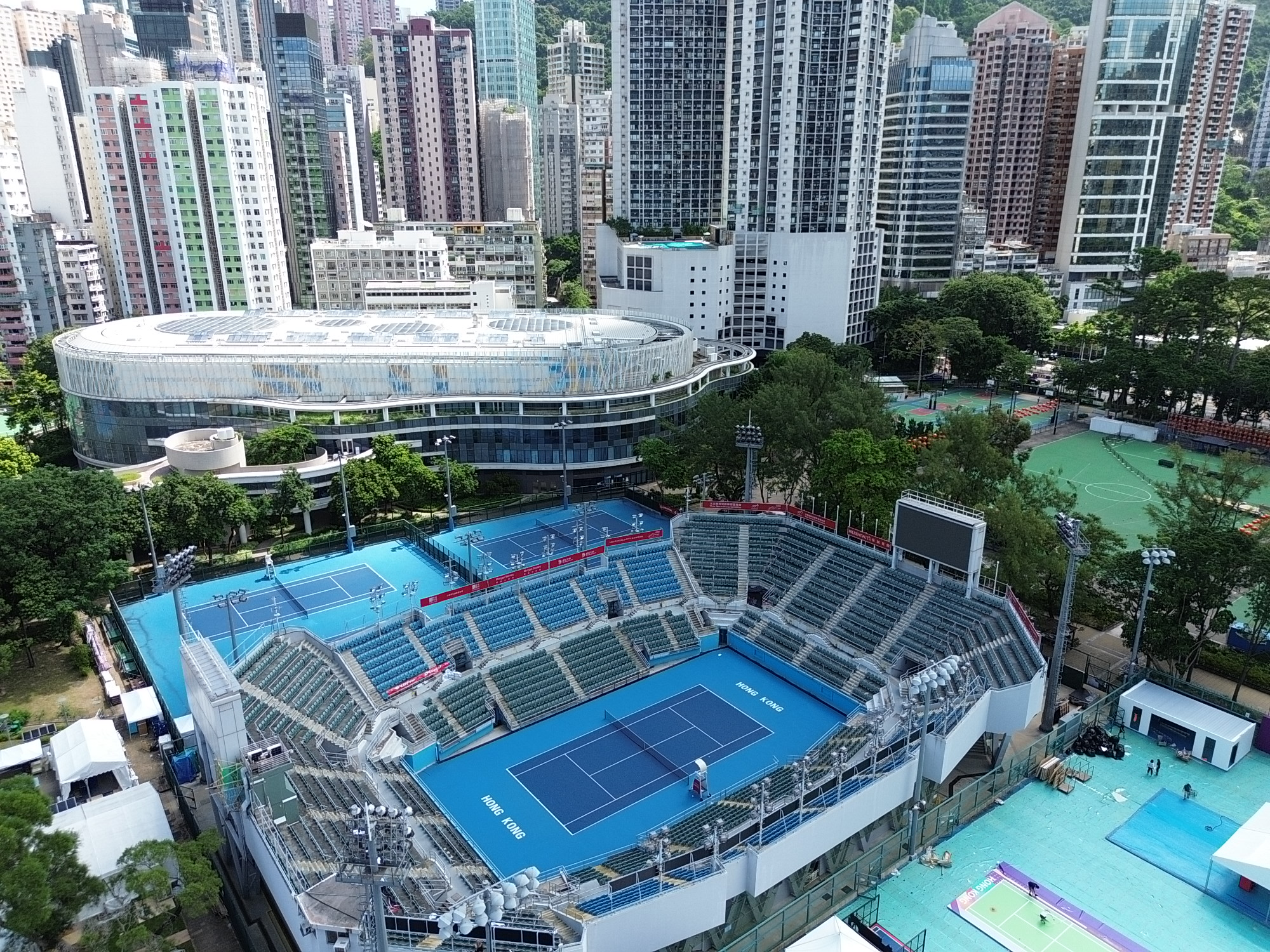
The tennis court (foreground) and the swimming pool (background)

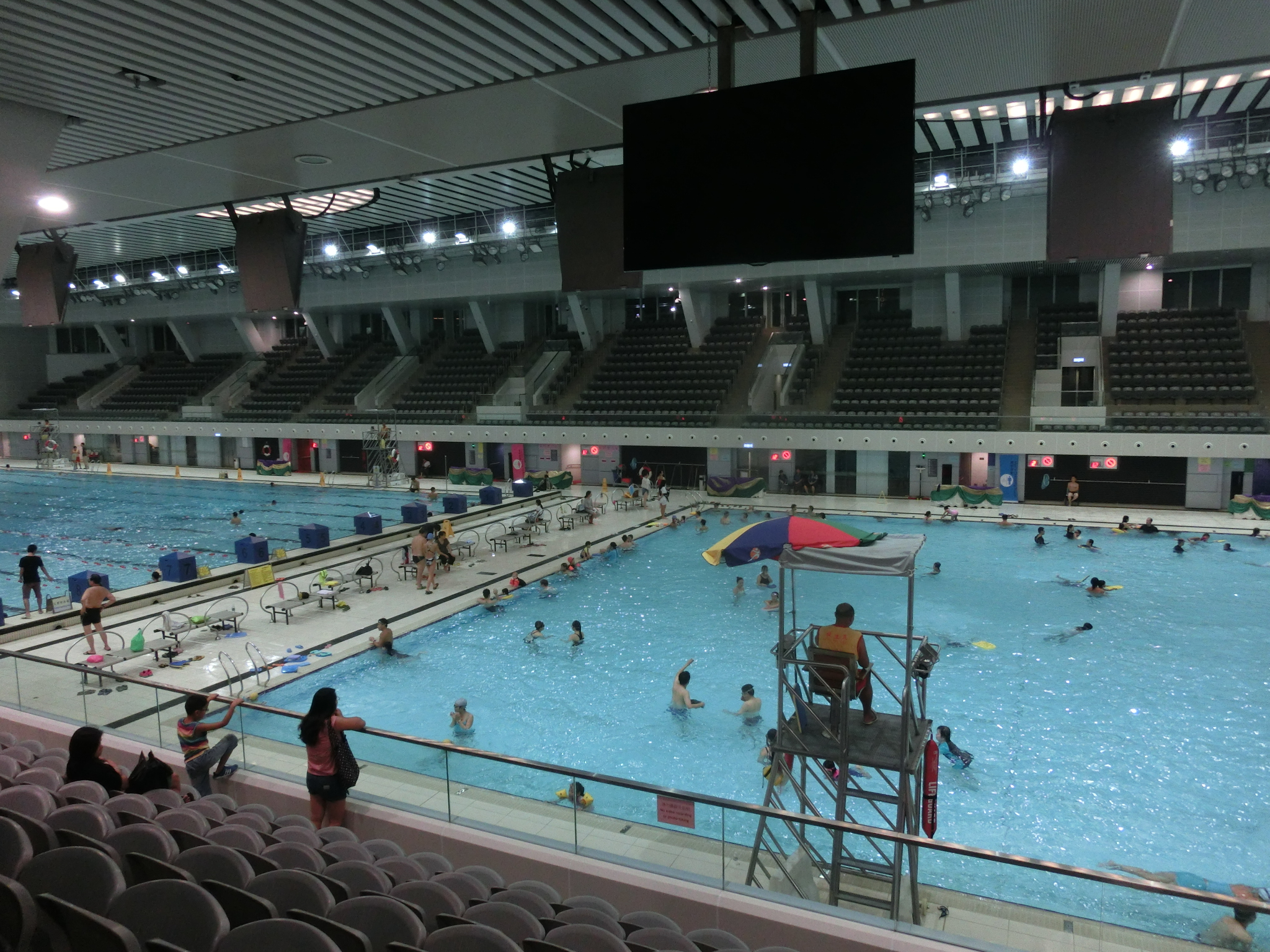
Indoor swimming pool within the park

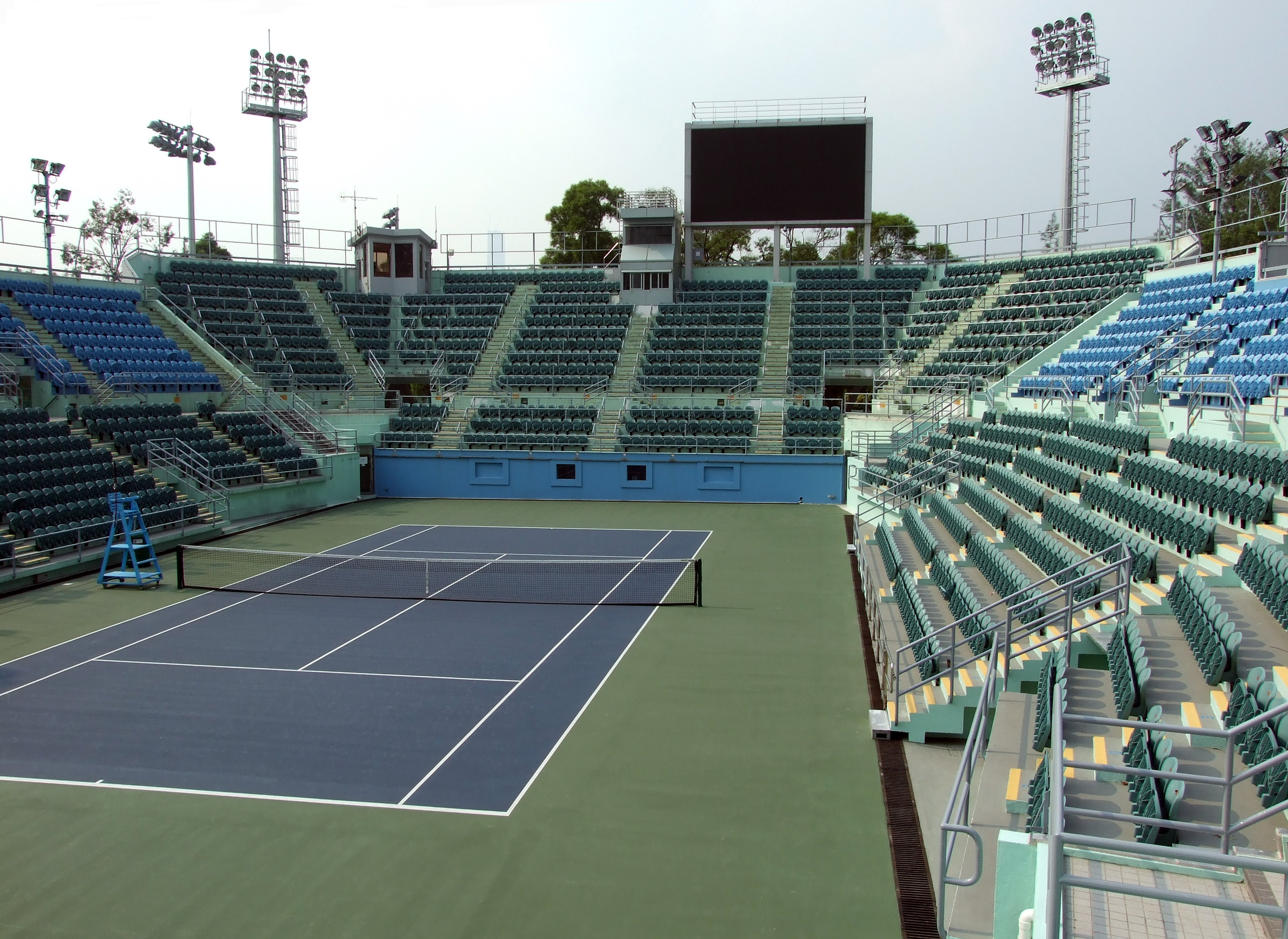
Central tennis court

In the central section of Victoria Park, there is a complex of fourteen tennis courts, with the main court, which opened in 1981, seating approximately 3,600 spectators. Two bowling greens are located nearby. A two-hectare central lawn is surrounded by pathways with trees to the west of the tennis courts. A 625-metre jogging path around the lawn features six fitness stations equipped with diverse exercise equipment. Six public football pitches are located south of the courts and central lawn, overlooked by the statue of Queen Victoria. Four basketball courts are located in the southeast section of the park, between the football pitches and the swimming pool.

There are public roller rinks, a handball and volleyball court, and table tennis courts. There are four playgrounds to the north of the tennis courts, each with its own set of slides, swings, and exercise equipment, as well as a pebble walking trail. A 954 square metre model yachting pond (with a depth of half a metre), and an open-air stage with a bandstand suitable for viewing by one hundred spectators are both located to the north of the central lawn. Most sports fields in the park have toilets, changing rooms, and drinking fountains. Open portions of the park are patrolled 24/7 by both local policemen and police teams.

The indoor swimming complex, which opened in September 2013 at a cost of nearly HK$800 million is located in the park's eastern section, on the site of the old Victoria Park Swimming Pool. It includes two pools with 2,500-seat spectator stands, and an electronic scoreboard, as well as changing rooms, showers, toilets, and wheelchair lifts. The old Victoria Park Swimming Pool was opened with the park itself in 1957, and was the first public swimming pool in Hong Kong.

=== Vegetation ===
Trees such as Jacaranda mimosifolia, Melia azedarach, Spathodea, Delonix regia and Casuarina equisetifolia are found in the park. The park is also home to many trees that are registered as "old and valuable", including Ceiba pentandra, Erythrina variegata, Mimusops elengi, Ficus virens and Ficus altissima.

== Events ==
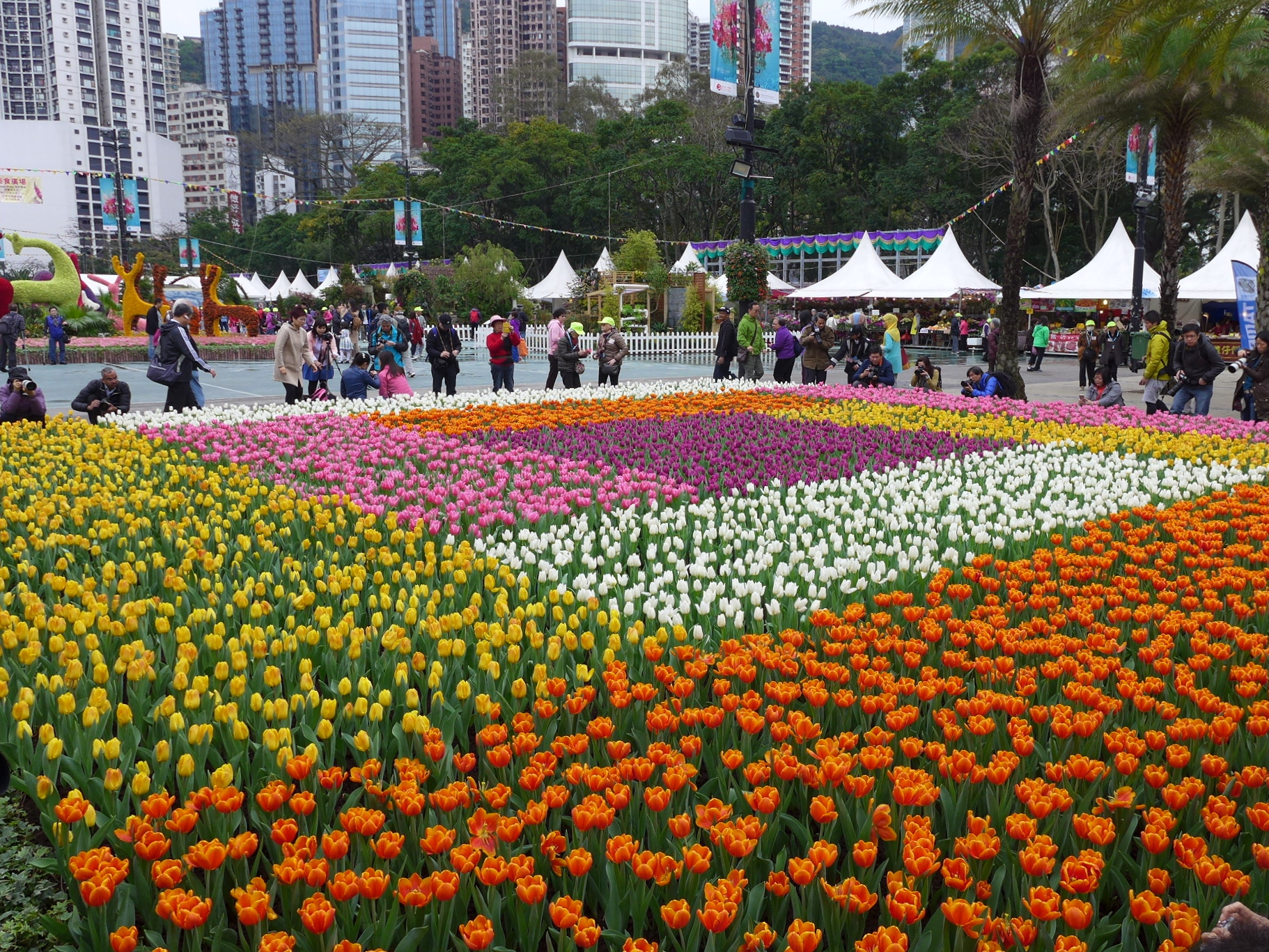
Hong Kong Flower Show 2016 in Victoria Park

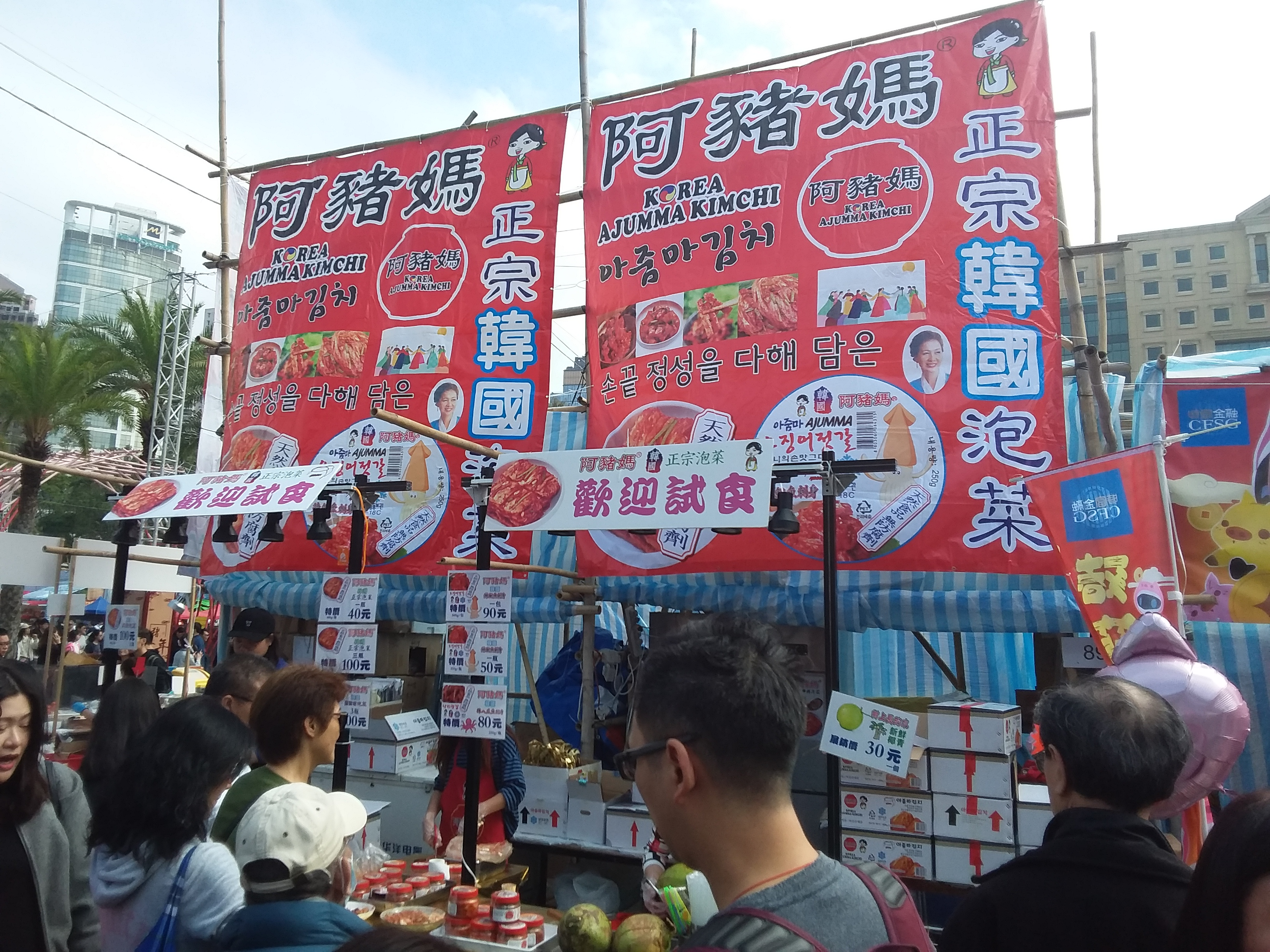
Market stall in the park during Lunar New Year Fair

In the days leading up to Chinese New Year, the park hosts the annual Lunar New Year Fair, which also includes a plant market – the event was not held in 2022 due to COVID-19. Other annual events such as the Hong Kong Flower Show, Hong Kong Brands and Products Expo, Mid-Autumn Festival, Hong Kong Marathon and Hong Kong Pride Parade are also held in the park.

Apart from annual events, employees of the Consulate General of Indonesia frequently arrange meetings and open-air training courses in the park. The United Buddy Bears exhibition, which was held on the central lawn of Victoria Park in 2004, drew over 2 million visitors, making it Hong Kong's largest open-air art exposition. The "Arts Corner" is hosted in the South Pavilion Square every Sunday, except when there are citywide events. Here, artists sell their works, souvenirs, handicrafts, paintings, drawings, cartoons, and photographs in kiosks and small booths.

Victoria Park serves as a gathering point for the annual 1 July marches. The park has become a staging ground for protests many times, including for pro-democracy protests in December 2005, the 2014 Occupy Movement, and anti-government demonstrations in the summer of 2019.

City Forum – attended by government officials, politicians, business people and pundits to debate new government policies – was formerly held at the park weekly on Sunday. The forum was inspired by Speakers' Corner in London, and was aired by the Hong Kong government broadcasting service Radio Television Hong Kong. It was discontinued in September 2021.

=== Tiananmen Square commemoration ===
The park serves as a place of commemoration for the Tiananmen Square massacre of 4 June 1989, with huge crowds gathering each year to mark the anniversary of the massacre. The park was closed in June 2021 owing to law enforcement restrictions imposed following the 2020 Hong Kong national security law. It was also closed for the commemoration in June 2020, and again in 2022 and 2023 (allegedly for "maintenance.")

== Transport ==
Two MTR stations (Causeway Bay and Tin Hau) are located near the park. Buses and trams run along the length of Causeway Road, and several pedestrian bridges with escalators and elevators have been built to connect the park with Causeway Road.

== Sources ==
- Bailey, Steven K. (2009). Exploring Hong Kong: A Visitor's Guide to Hong Kong Island, Kowloon, and the New Territories. Things Asian Press. ISBN 9781934159163.
- Constable, Nicola (2007). Maid to Order in Hong Kong: Stories of Migrant Workers. Cornell University Press. ISBN 9780801446474.
- Curry, Janel; Hanstedt, Paul (2014). Reading Hong Kong, Reading Ourselves. City University of HK Press. ISBN 9789629372354.
- Ho, Elizabeth (2012). Neo-Victorianism and the Memory of Empire. A&C Black. ISBN 9781441187703.
- Ingham, Mike (2007). Hong Kong: A Cultural History. Oxford University Press. ISBN 9780195314977.
- Inversini, Alessandro; Schegg, Roland (2016). Information and Communication Technologies in Tourism 2016. Springer. ISBN 9783319282312.
- Miao, Pu (2013). Public Places in Asia Pacific Cities: Current Issues and Strategies. Springer Science & Business Media. ISBN 9789401728157.
- Ng, Janet (2009). Paradigm City: Space, Culture, and Capitalism in Hong Kong. State University of New York Press. ISBN 9780791477229.
- O'Connor, Paul (2012). Islam in Hong Kong: Muslims and Everyday Life in China's World City. Hong Kong University Press. ISBN 9789888139576.
- Wai-ting, Stephanie Cheung (2004). "Public art in Hong Kong". HKU Scholars Hub. University of Hong Kong.
- Wordie, Jason (2002). Streets: Exploring Hong Kong Island. Hong Kong University Press. ISBN 9789622095632.
