= Central, Hong Kong =

Central business district in Hong Kong

Coordinates: 22°16′55″N 114°09′29″E

Central
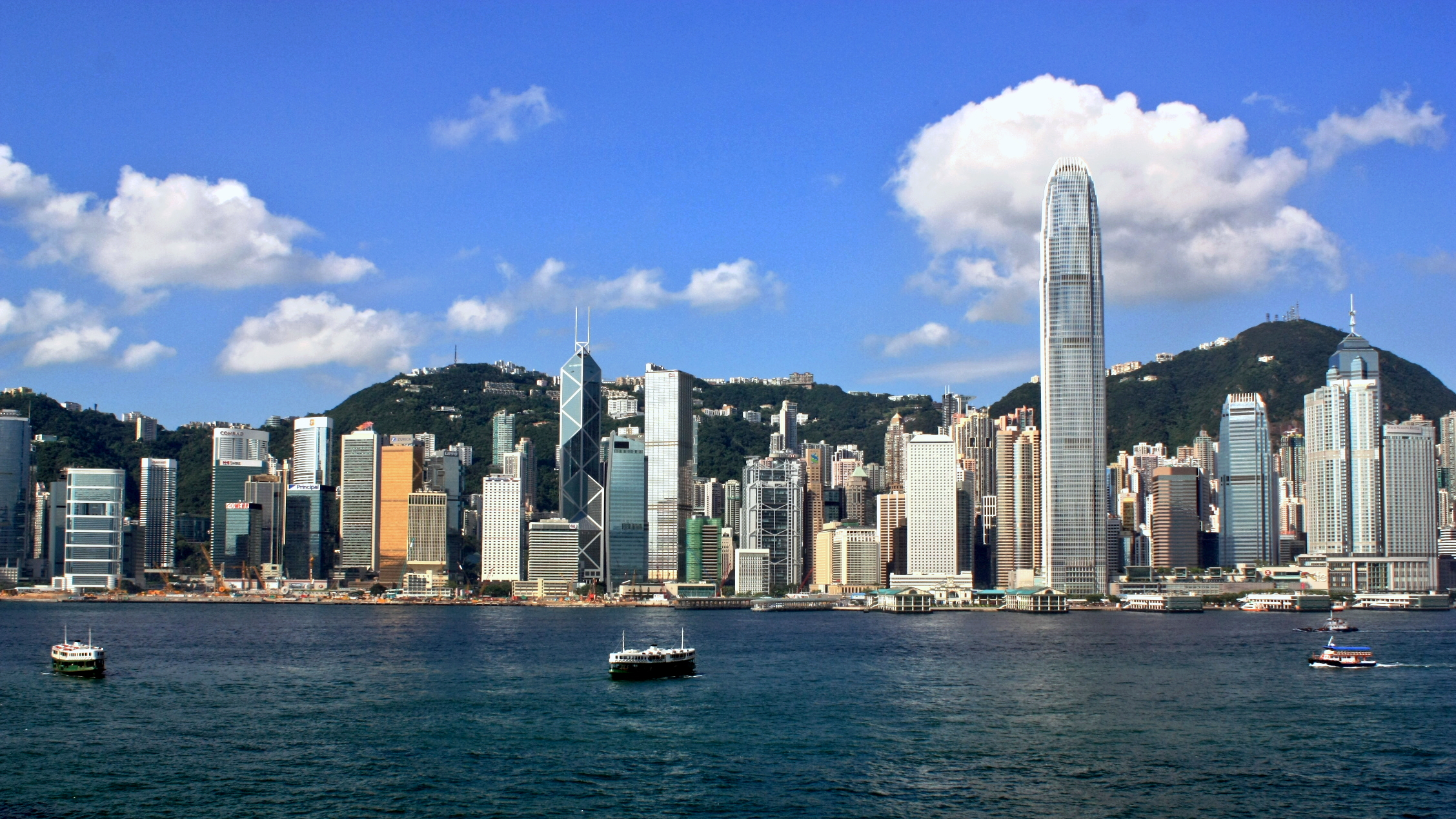
- Central as viewed from Tsim Sha Tsui, on the opposite side of Victoria Harbour
- Traditional Chinese: 中環
- Simplified Chinese: 中环
- Cantonese Yale: Jūng Wàahn
Transcriptions
Standard Mandarin
- Hanyu Pinyin: Zhōnghuán
Yue: Cantonese
- Yale Romanization: Jūng Wàahn
- Jyutping: Zung^{1} waan^{4}
- IPA: [tsʊ́ŋ wȁːn]

Central (Chinese: 中環), also known as Central District, is the central business district of Hong Kong. It is located in the northeastern corner of the Central and Western District, on the north shore of Hong Kong Island, across Victoria Harbour from Tsim Sha Tsui, the southernmost point of Kowloon Peninsula. The area was the heart of Victoria City, although that name is rarely used anymore.

As the central business district of Hong Kong, it is the area where many multinational financial services corporations have their headquarters. Consulates of many countries are also located in this area, as is Government Hill, the site of the government headquarters until 2011. The area, with its proximity to Victoria Harbour, has served as the centre of trade and financial activities from the earliest days of the British colonial era in 1841, and continues to flourish and serve as the place of administration since the handover to China in 1997.

== Naming ==
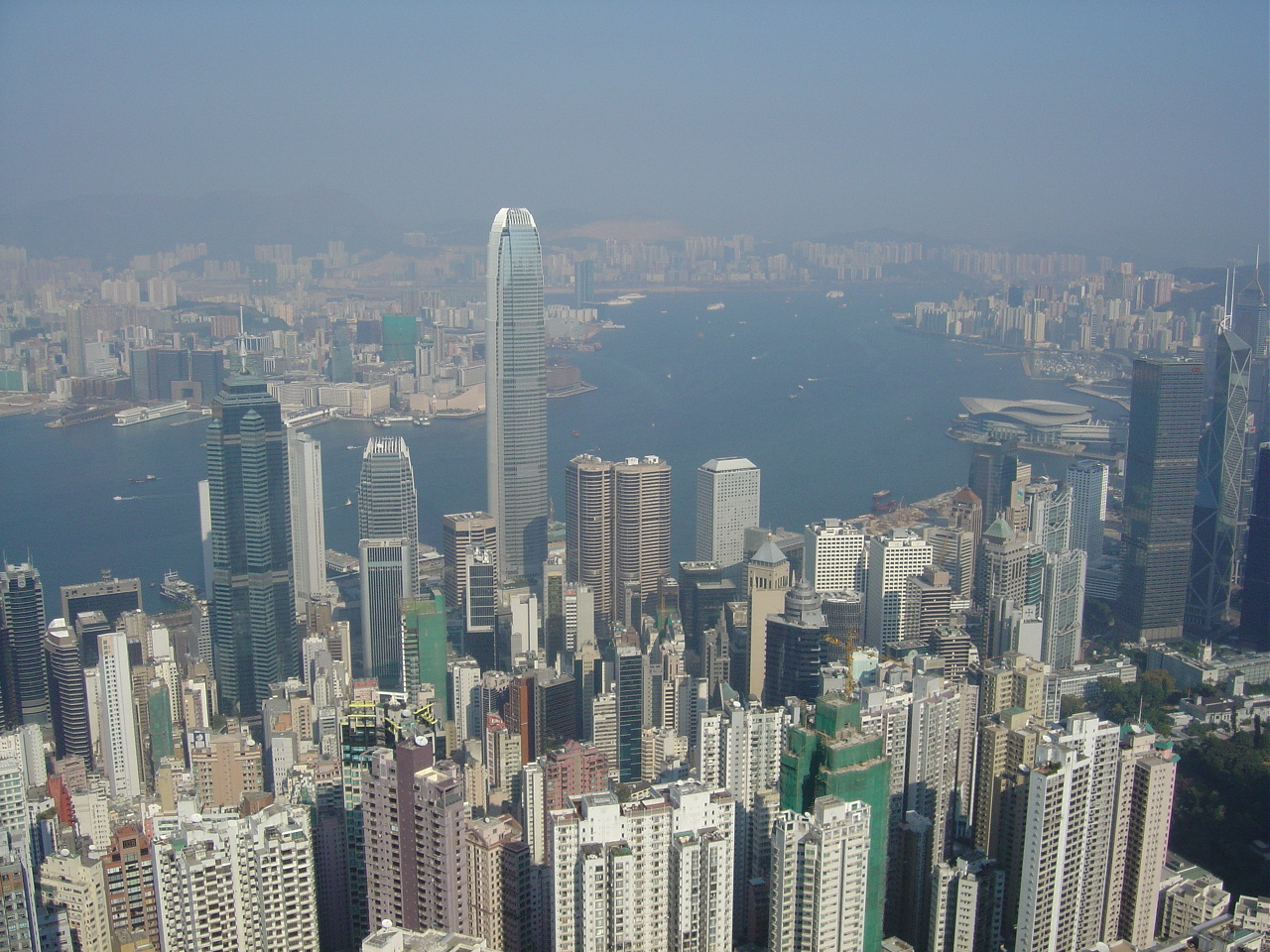
View of Central and Victoria Harbour from Victoria Peak. Tsim Sha Tsui is visible across the harbour.

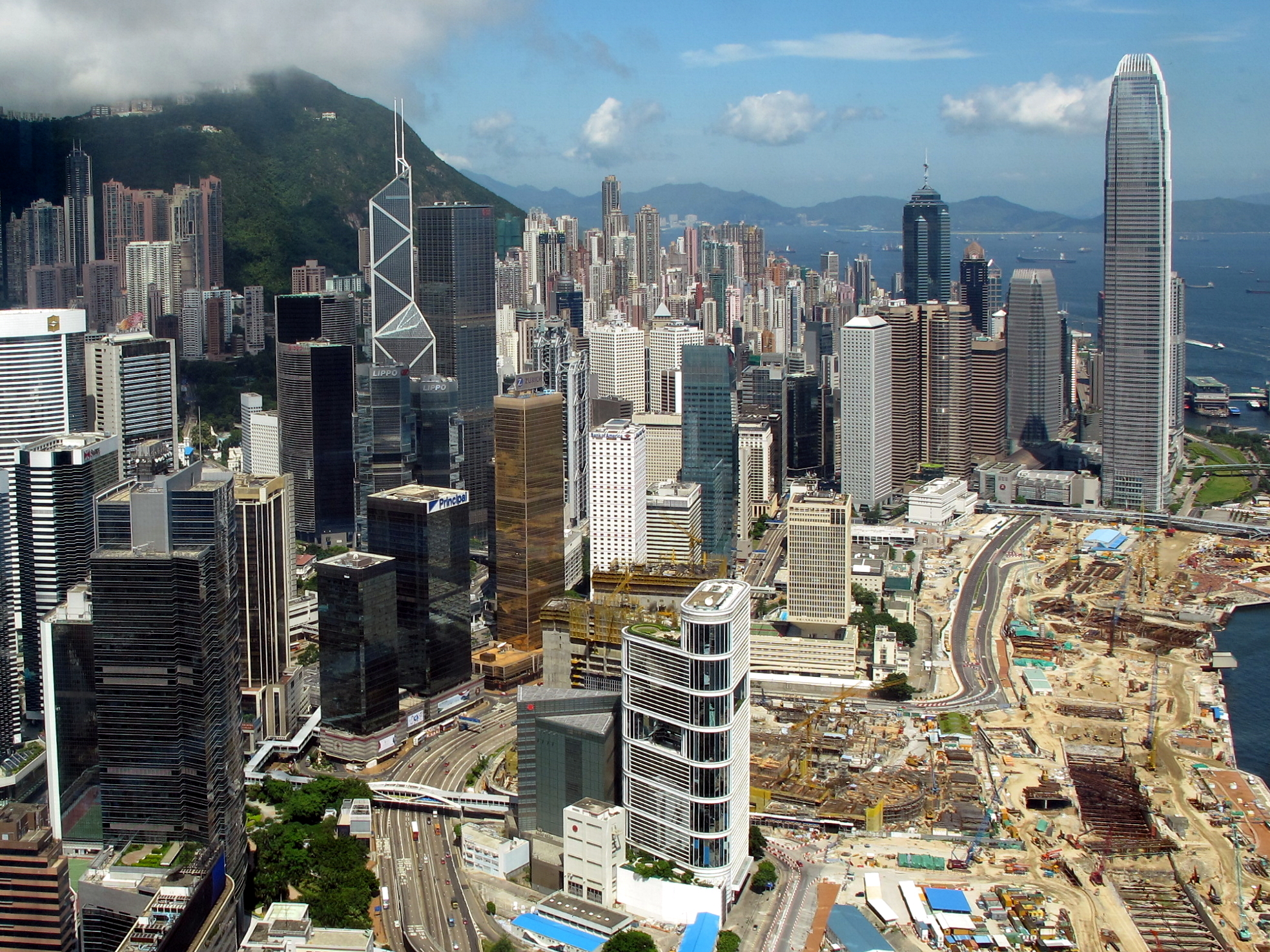
Admiralty, Central and the Central and Wan Chai Reclamation, view from the east in 2010.

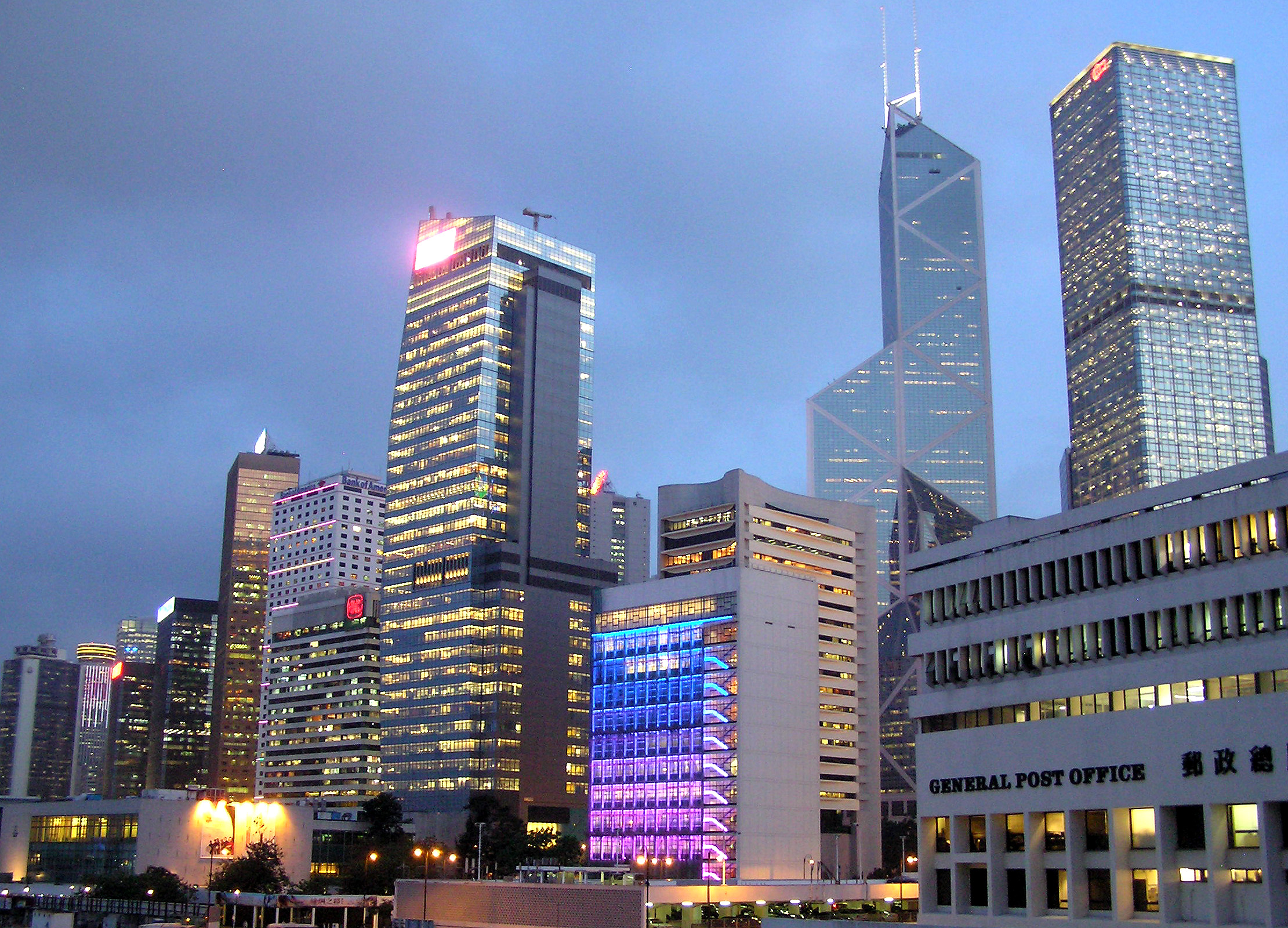
The General Post Office, the City Hall, and the surrounding business buildings in Central, viewed from the west.

The area of Chung Wan (previously spelled "Choong Wan") is a direct translation of "central" in English and was one of the districts (四環九約) in Victoria City. The English name, Central became prevalent after the Island line of the MTR metro system was built in the early 1980s, and the connected stations of Pedder and Chater (named after major streets in the area) were renamed as Central. On some older maps, Central and the area to its west are named Kwan Tai Lo (羣帶路) below Victoria Peak. It formed a channel, Chung Mun (中門), with Tsim Sha Tsui, on the sea route along the coast of southern China. The eastern part of Central District has been known as Admiralty since the completion of Admiralty station in the early 1980s.

Despite the name Central being synonymous with the Central and Western District, and Central station, there are significant differences. Central and Western is a administrative district with strict boundaries, legislative representation, and elections for its legislators. Central station (more commonly referred to as Central) is a stop along the MTR Island Line, but is not the only station within the Central and Western District. Other stops include Hong Kong, Admiralty, Sheung Wan and more. The Central area is a loosely defined area within the Central and Western district defined by the presence of major banks, sky scrapers, and multi-modal transportation nodes.

== Location ==
Central is located on the north shore of Hong Kong Island, across Victoria Harbour from Tsim Sha Tsui, the southernmost point of Kowloon Peninsula. It is bordered in the west by Sheung Wan, with the border being along Aberdeen Street (also called Wing Kut Street). It is bordered in the east by Admiralty, an eastern extension of the Central and Western District. As such, Admiralty is sometimes considered a part of Central. Central is bordered in the south by Mid-Levels, an affluent residential area halfway up Victoria Peak. The boundary between Central and Mid-Levels is not clearly defined.

For district council elections purposes, the area, together with Admiralty, correspond roughly to the "Chung Wan" constituency. The boundaries of such constituencies may be subject to modification.

== History ==
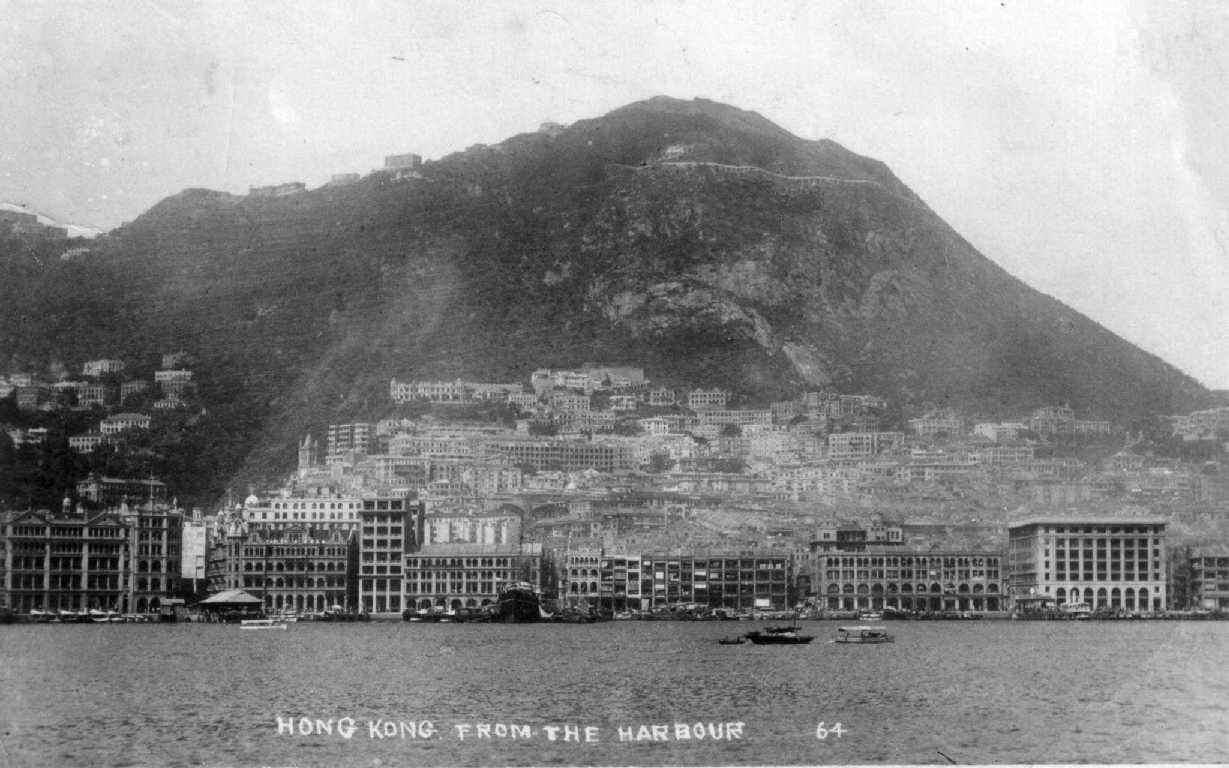
Central waterfront in the 1920s.

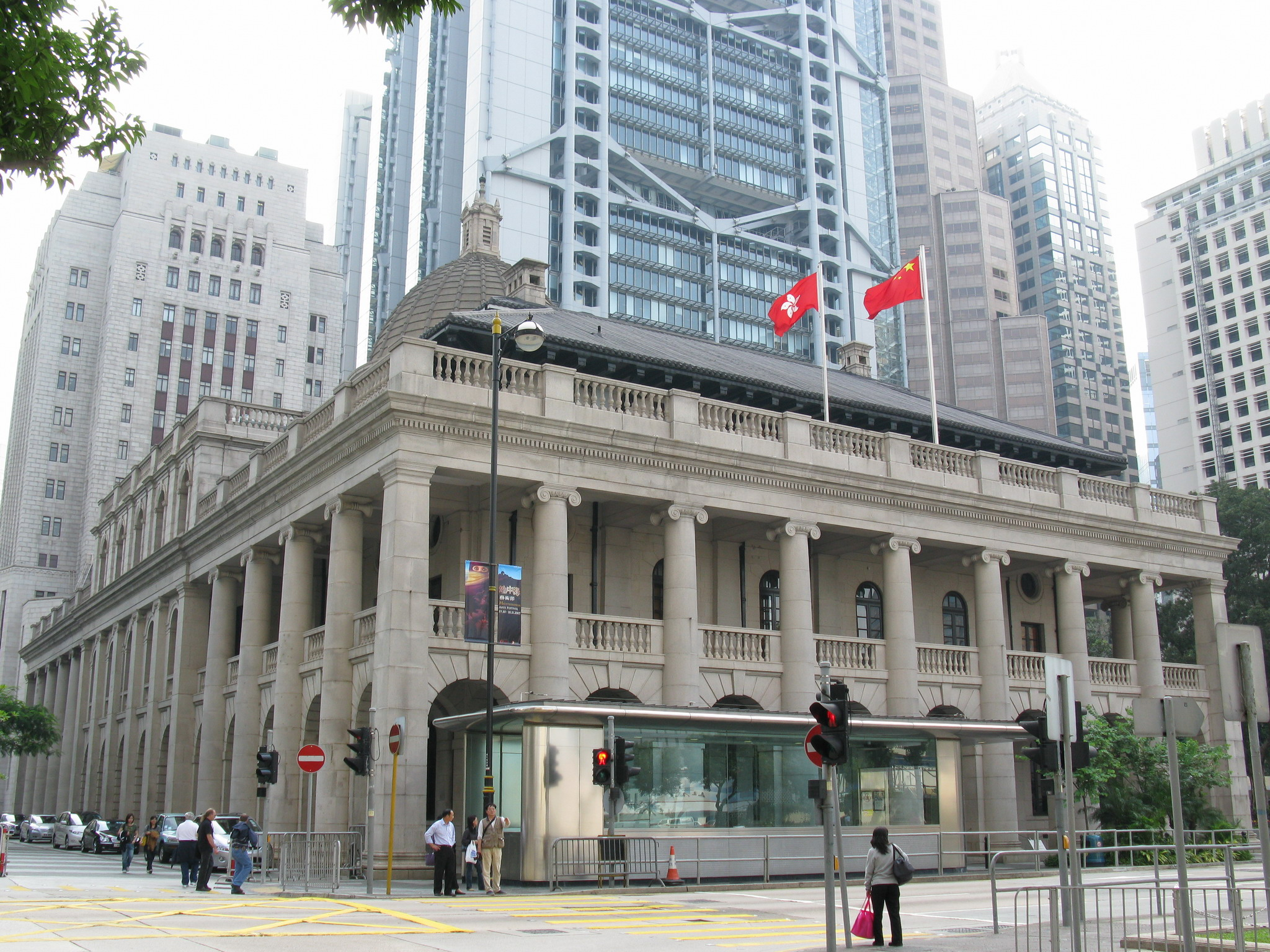
The Court of Final Appeal Building, completed in 1912, once used as the building of Legislative Council of Hong Kong from 1985 to 2011.

The British landed on Possession Point of Sheung Wan in 1841. They soon decided to build a city on the north coast of Hong Kong Island, and the present-day Central was chosen to house major military facilities and an administrative centre. Part of these military facilities include the Royal Navy port known as Naval Dockyard, and then later Admiralty. Another area to the north of Admiralty would be named Tamar for the HMS Tamar shore station (named for HMS Tamar, a Royal Navy troopship that arrived and was used as a shore base during the second opium war). The area soon attracted both Westerners and Chinese to trade and live in the area, and a Canton Bazaar (the precursor of the Central Market) was built between Cochrane Street and Graham Street in 1842. The area was soon zoned for Westerners only, and Chinese residents were restricted to Sheung Wan. It was zoned for "Western-style buildings," meaning buildings with space requirements and hygiene standards similar to European. The area was largely dominated by the presence of Victoria City. The popularity of this area would also boost the population of Hong Kong from 5,000 in 1841 to 24,000 in 1848. Government House and other Hong Kong Government buildings were completed during this period on Government Hill. Various barracks, naval bases and the residence of the Commander of British Forces in Hong Kong, Flagstaff House were built on the east end of the district. Between 1860 and 1880 the construction of City Hall, Theatre Royal and other financial structures made Central the heart of Hong Kong.

In 1904, the Praya Reclamation Scheme added 59 acres (24 ha) of land to Central's waterfront. Many of the proposals came from Sir Paul Chater and James Johnstone Keswick, the founders of Hongkong Land, a modern property development group. During the 1920s, Hong Kong was able to push far ahead economically, because of the cohesive collaboration between Central and all waterfront commerce.

The military structures survived until the 1980s. Only Flagstaff House remains as Museum of Tea Ware in Hong Kong Park. City Hall sat on the present premises of the HSBC Hong Kong headquarters. Hong Kong's first road, Queen's Road (subdivided into Queen's Road East, Central, and West), passes through the area and the business centre has continued to expand the Hong Kong shoreline into Victoria Harbour. The Hong Kong Garrison was home to the British Forces in Hong Kong, until the handover in 1997, since then it has been occupied by the People's Liberation Army of China.

Central has been the site of a number of major political protests. From October 2011 to September 2012, the Occupy Central movement against global economic inequality was based in front of the HSBC Main Building. Two years later, in September 2014, democratic activists initiated Occupy Central with Love and Peace, demanding universal suffrage for the election of the Chief Executive of Hong Kong, eventually contributing to the Umbrella Revolution.

== Economy ==
There are many Grade-A commercial buildings in Central, a prime commercial district in Hong Kong.

Bank of China (Hong Kong) has its head office in the Bank of China Tower. The Hongkong and Shanghai Banking Corporation, a subsidiary of HSBC, has its head office in the HSBC Main Building., while Standard Chartered's head office is in Standard Chartered Bank Building. The Hong Kong or Asia offices of several major U.S. and Chinese banks are situated in Central, including JPMorgan Chase, Goldman Sachs, Bank of America, Citibank, State Street, CICC, China Development Bank, ICBC, Bank of Communication, Agricultural Bank of China and China Construction Bank.

The Hong Kong Monetary Authority, the IMF Resident Representative Office, and the BIS Representative Office are all based in the International Finance Centre. The Hong Kong Stock Exchange is located at Exchange Square. The Securities and Futures Commission moved its head office from Cheung Kong Center in Central to One Island East in Quarry Bay, reportedly because of high rents. The Hong Kong Association of Banks maintains its office in Central.

ANZ, Barclays, BNP Paribas, UBS AG, MUFG, SMBC, CIBC, Julius Baer, Macquarie, Nomura, Jefferies, DBS, Fubon Bank, Bank of East Asia, and Hang Seng Bank all maintain regional or country offices in Central.

AIA Group's registered office is in the AIA Central, while Prudential plc maintains its principal place of business at the One IFC. The district is also home to numerous investment firms and funds, including China Investment Corporation, SAFE Investment Company, China Asset Management, Abu Dhabi Investment Authority, Canada Pension Plan Investment Board, Apollo Global Management, AQR, Blackstone,BlackRock, Carlyle, Citadel, Davidson Kempner, D. E. Shaw, EQT AB, ExodusPoint, E Fund Management, Franklin Templeton, General Atlantic, Invesco, Jane Street, KKR, L&G, Man Group, Millennium Management, Pictet, PIMCO, Point72, Susquehanna, TPG T. Rowe Price and Two Sigma. Credit rating agencies Fitch Ratings and Standard & Poor's also maintain offices in Central.

Jardine Matheson, Hongkong Land, CK Hutchison, CK Asset, CK Infrastructure, Hang Lung Properties and Henderson Land Development continue to have their headquarters in the area.The head offices of Chow Tai Fook Group and New World Development is in the New World Tower in Central.. China National Offshore Oil Corporation's office is on the 65/F, Bank of China Tower.

Before 1999, Cathay Pacific had its head office in the Swire House in Central. In 1999, the airline relocated its head office to the Hong Kong International Airport.

Central is home to the Hong Kong offices of several major international law firms, including, A&O, Clifford Chance, CMS, Davis Polk, DLA Piper, Fangda Partners, Gibson Dunn, Herbert Smith Freehills, Jones Day, JSM, JunHe, King & Wood, Kirkland & Ellis, Latham & Watkins, Linklaters, Mayer Brown, Milbank, Morrison & Foerster, Skadden, Sidley Austin, Simpson Thacer, Slaughter and May, Sullivan & Cromwell, White & Case and Zhong Lun. It is also the location of the headquarters of Deacons, Hong Kong's largest local law firm. Des Voeux Chambers is based in Gloucester Tower. Both the AALCO Hong Kong Regional Arbitration Centre and the Hague Conference on Private International Law - Regional Office are located in the Former French Mission Building

Major consultancies and accounting firms, such as McKinsey & Company, Bain & Company, AlixPartners, Protiviti, PwC, and KPMG, also have their main offices in Central.

Central is also home to the Rolex Service Centre in Hong Kong, Richemont’s Asia-Pacific operations and the AP house of Audemars Piguet in the city. Christie's and Sotheby's have their main offices in the Henderson and Chater House, respectively. The Hongkong and Shanghai Hotels, the owner of the Peninsula Hotels, the Peak Tower and the Peak Tram, has its corporate office in St. George's Building while the first hotel of the Mandarin Oriental Hotel Group, the Mandarin is at 5 Connaught Road Central. Emirates Airline Store (Hong Kong) is in the Nexxus Building.

The Hong Kong office of Bloomberg L.P.’s is in Cheung Kong Centre.

== Notable places, streets and buildings ==
=== Office buildings ===
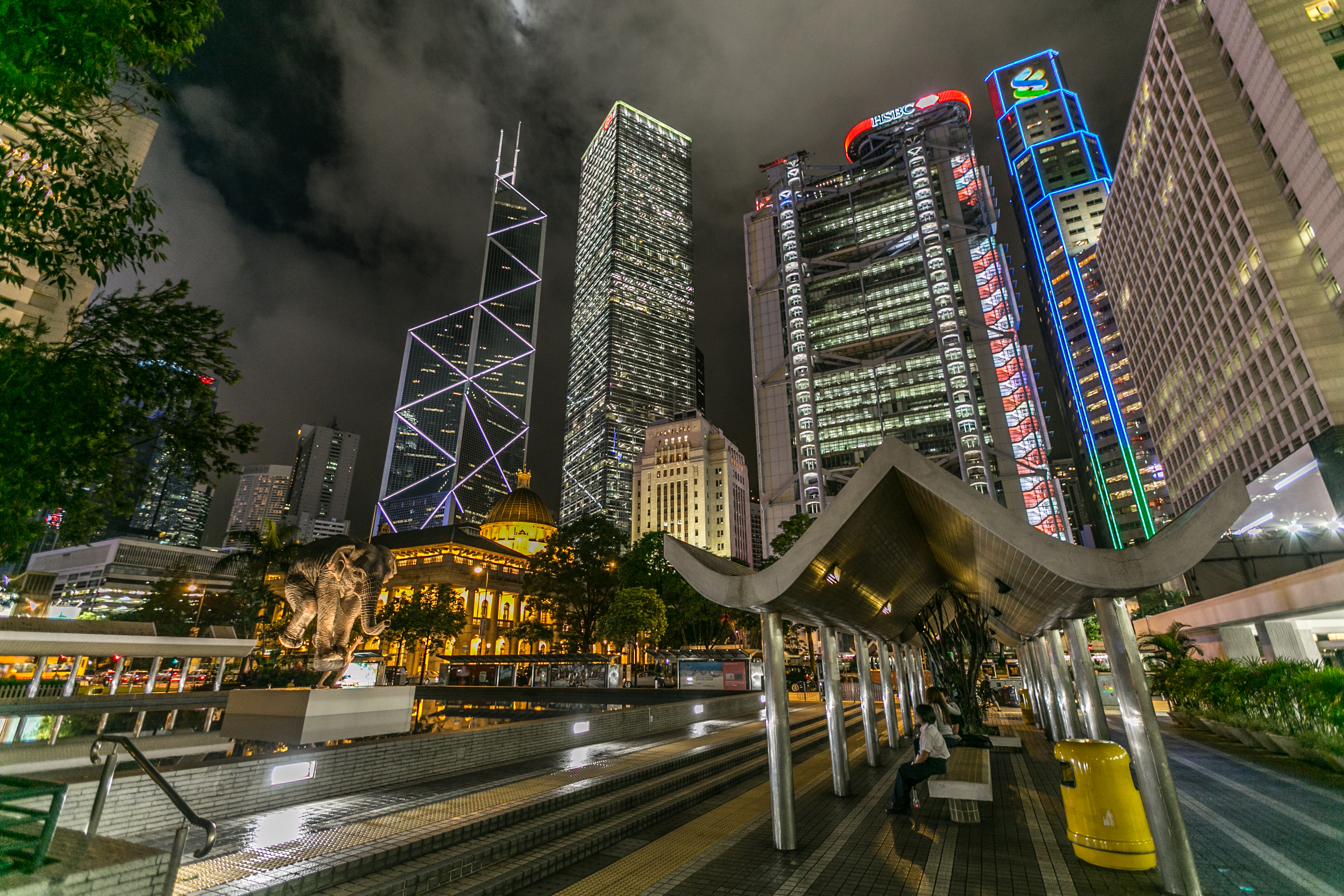
Night view of Statue Square. From left to right: Bank of China Tower, HSBC Main Building, Standard Chartered Bank Building and Prince's Building

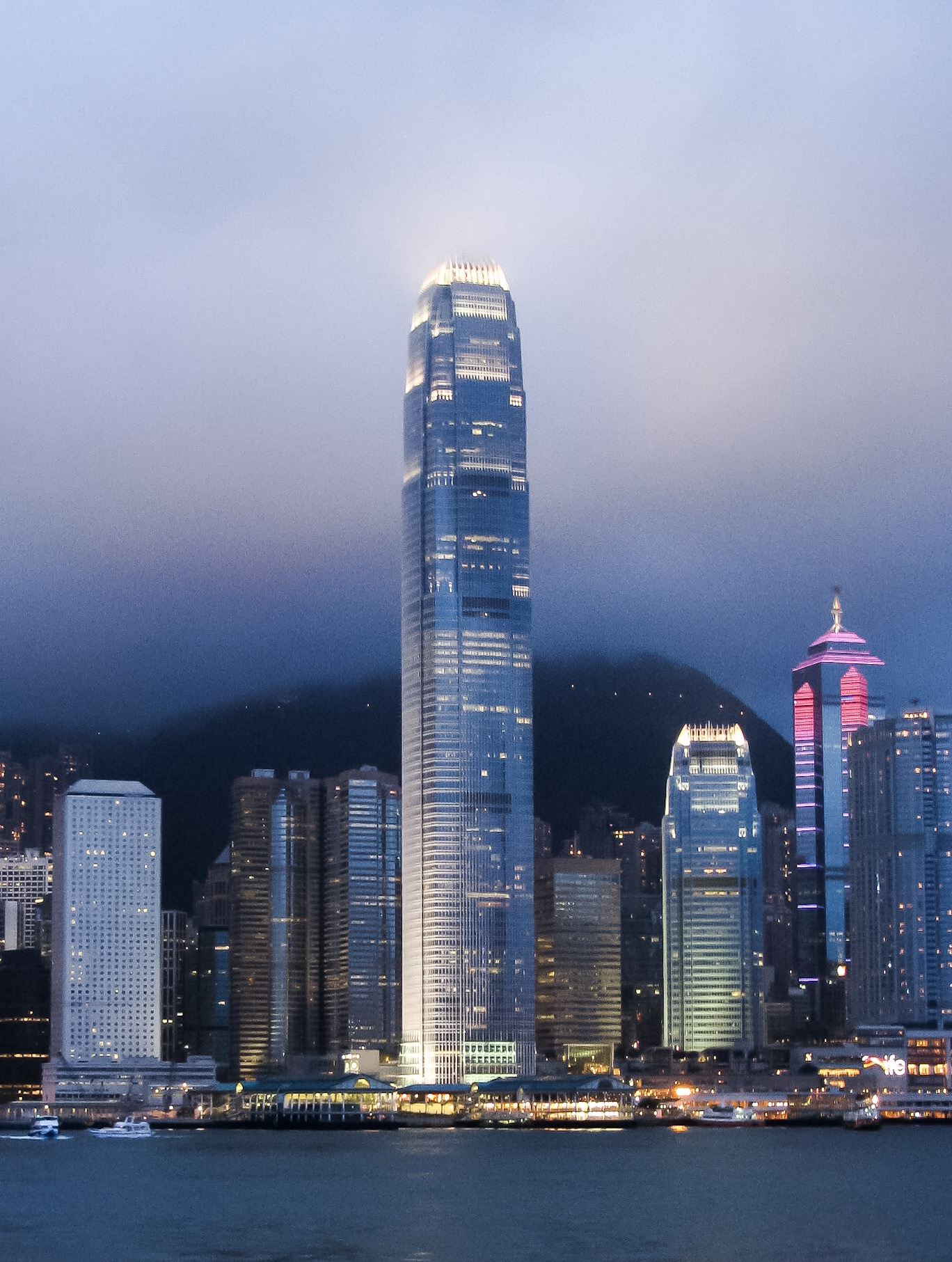
Two International Finance Centre.

- 8 Queen's Road Central
- 9 Queen's Road Central
- Agricultural Bank of China Tower
- AIA Central
- Alexandra House
- Bank of China Building, housing the China Club
- Bank of China Tower
- Bank of East Asia Building
- CCB Tower
- Central Building
- Central Tower, Hong Kong
- Chater House
- Cheung Kong Center
- Cheung Kong Center II
- China Building
- Citibank Plaza
- CITIC Tower
- Club Lusitano Building, housing the Club Lusitano
- Edinburgh Tower
- Entertainment Building
- Exchange Square, housing the Hong Kong Stock Exchange
- Gloucester Tower
- Hang Seng Bank Headquarters Building
- Hong Kong Club Building, housing the Hong Kong Club
- Hong Kong Trade Centre
- HSBC Main Building
- ICBC Tower
- Jardine House
- LHT Tower
- Man Yee Building
- Nexxus building
- Prince's Building
- Shanghai Commercial Bank Tower
- St. George's Building
- St. John's Building, housing the Office of the European Union to Hong Kong
- Standard Chartered Bank Building
- The Center
- The Centrium
- The Henderson
- The Landmark (office and shopping complex)
- International Finance Centre (IFC), the second tallest building in Hong Kong, housing the Hong Kong Monetary Authority
- Wheelock House
- Wing On House
- World-Wide House
- York House

=== Streets and squares ===
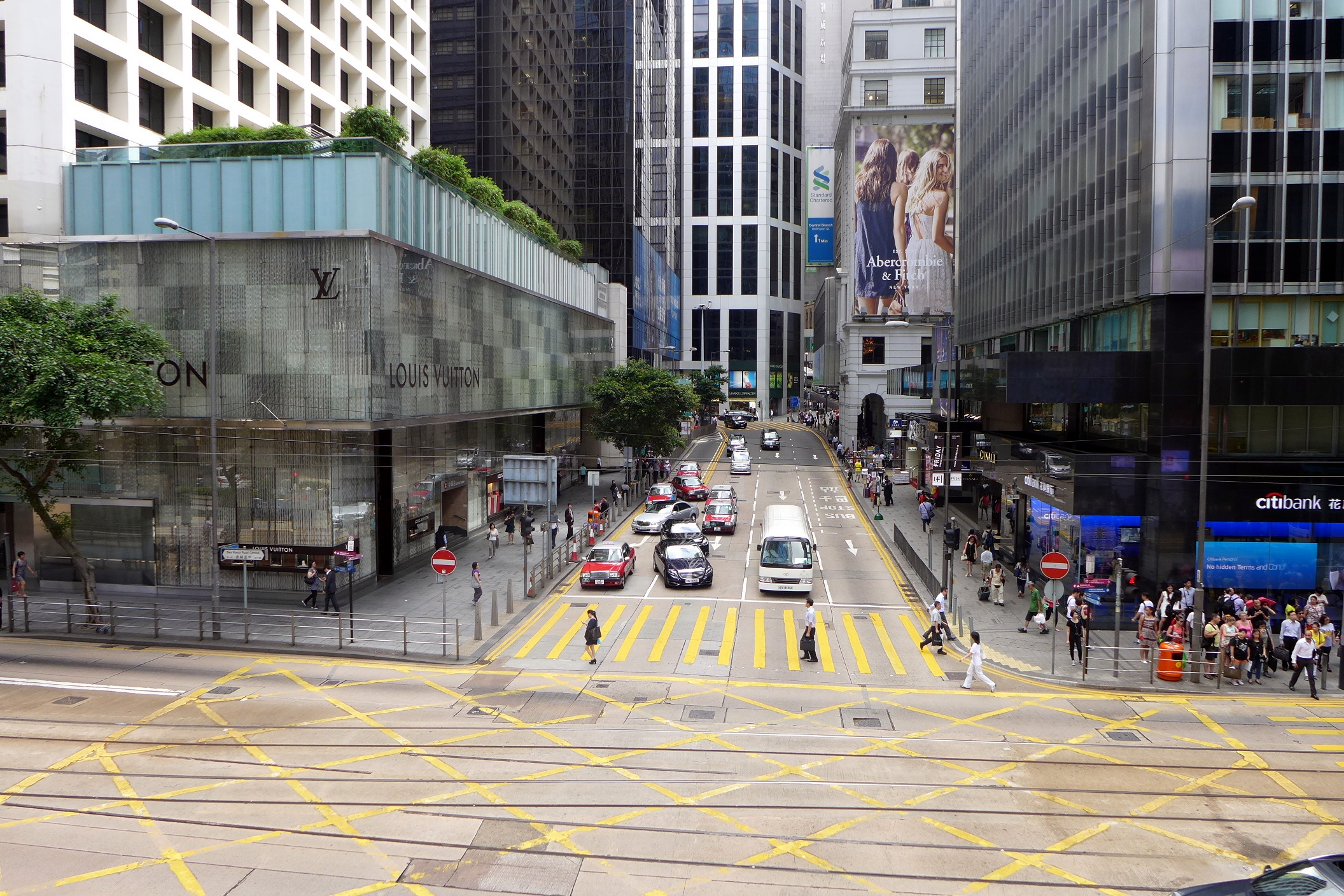
Pedder Street

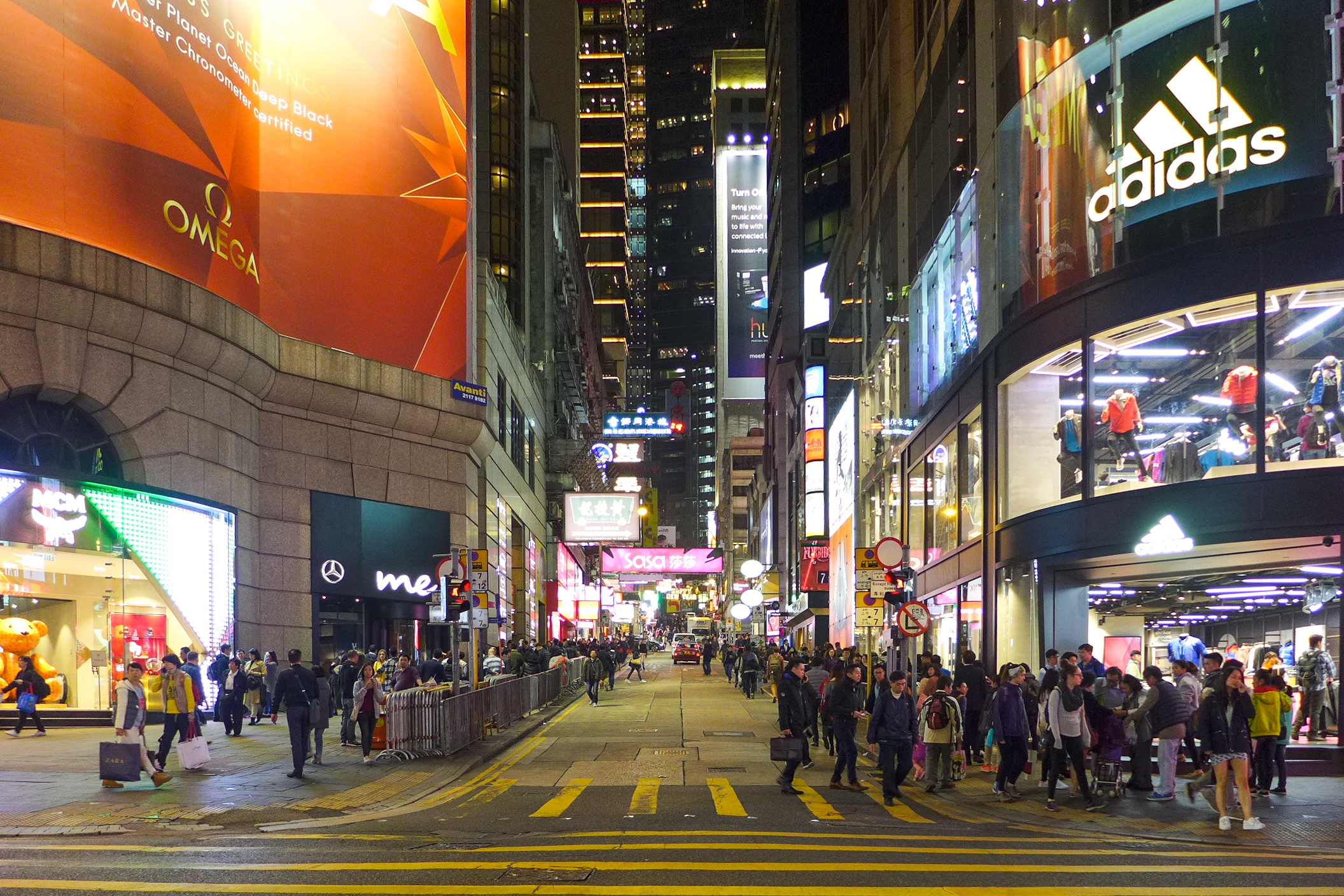
Intersection of the lower end of D'Aguilar Street with Queen's Road in 2016

- Aberdeen Street, marking the limit between Central and Sheung Wan
- Arbuthnot Road
- Battery Path
- Chater Road
- Connaught Place
- Cochrane Street
- Connaught Road Central
- Cotton Tree Drive
- D'Aguilar Street
- Des Voeux Road Central
- Edinburgh Place, a public square adjacent to the Victoria Harbour
- Elgin Street
- Gage Street, a market street
- Garden Road
- Glenealy
- Graham Street, a market street
- Gutzlaff Street
- Hollywood Road
- Ice House Street
- Jubilee Street (租庇利街). Named for the Golden Jubilee of Queen Victoria in 1887.
- Lower Albert Road
- Lyndhurst Terrace
- Old Bailey Street
- On Lan Street
- Pedder Street
- Peel Street
- Pottinger Street, one of the "ladder streets"
- Queen's Road Central, the first road in Hong Kong built by the Government of Hong Kong between 1841 and 1843
- Queen Victoria Street
- Queensway, in Admiralty
- Stanley Street
- Statue Square, a public pedestrian square
- Staunton Street
- Staveley Street, one of the "ladder streets"
- Theatre Lane, home to many of Hong Kong's shoe shiners
- Wellington Street
- Wyndham Street
- Wing On Street (永安街), aka. Cloth Street (花布街)

=== Government buildings ===
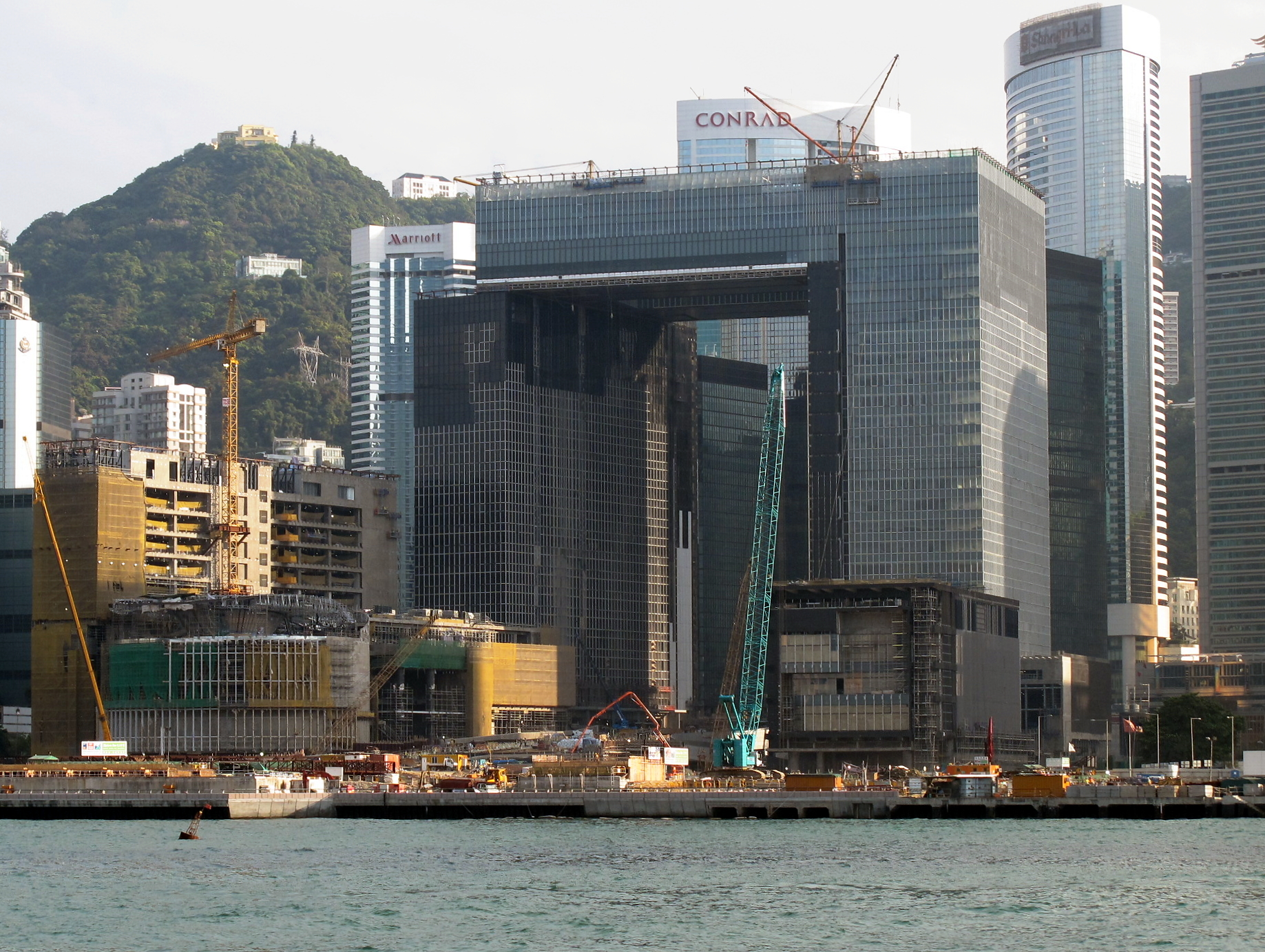
Central Government Complex, Tamar under construction in March 2011.

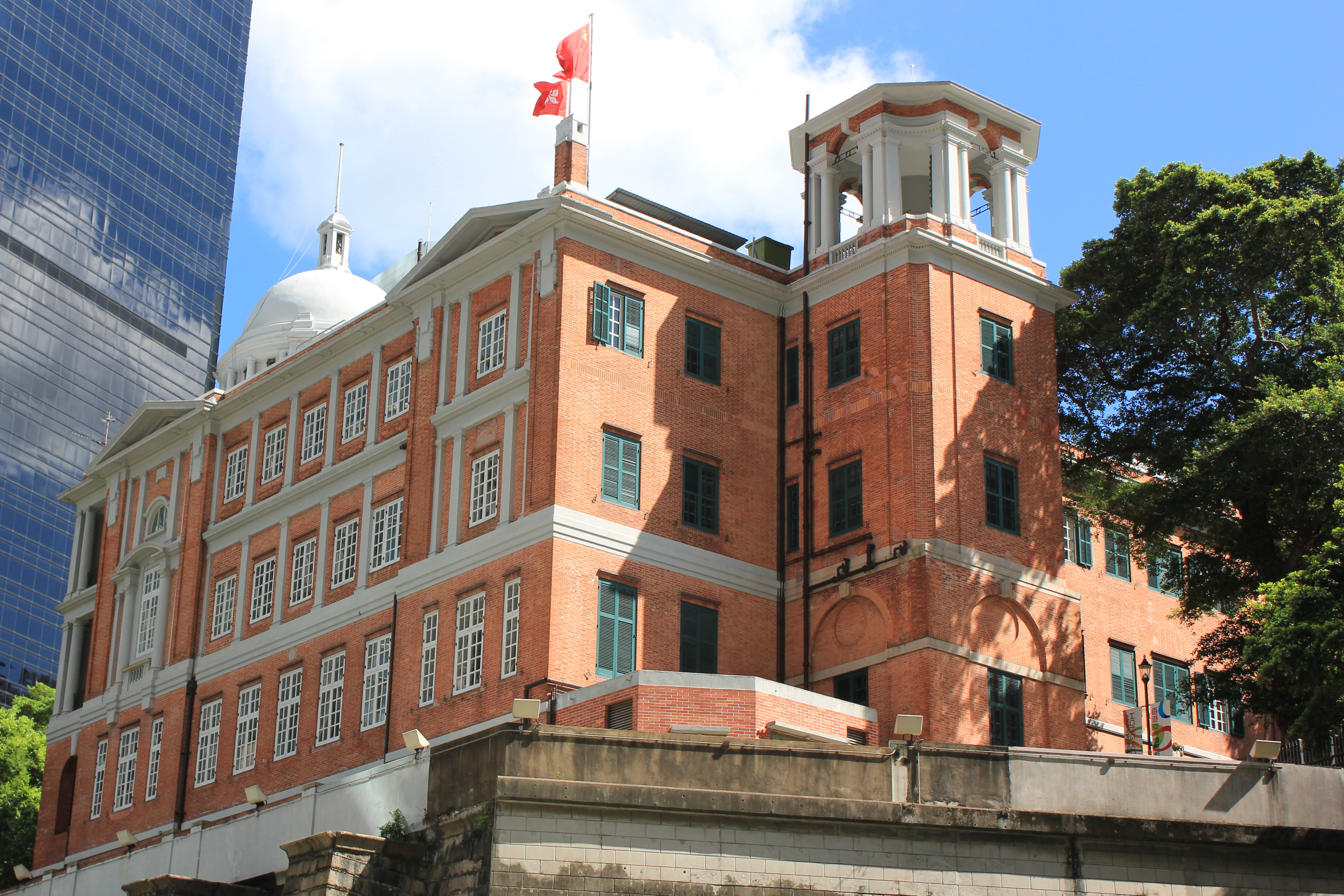
Former French Mission Building

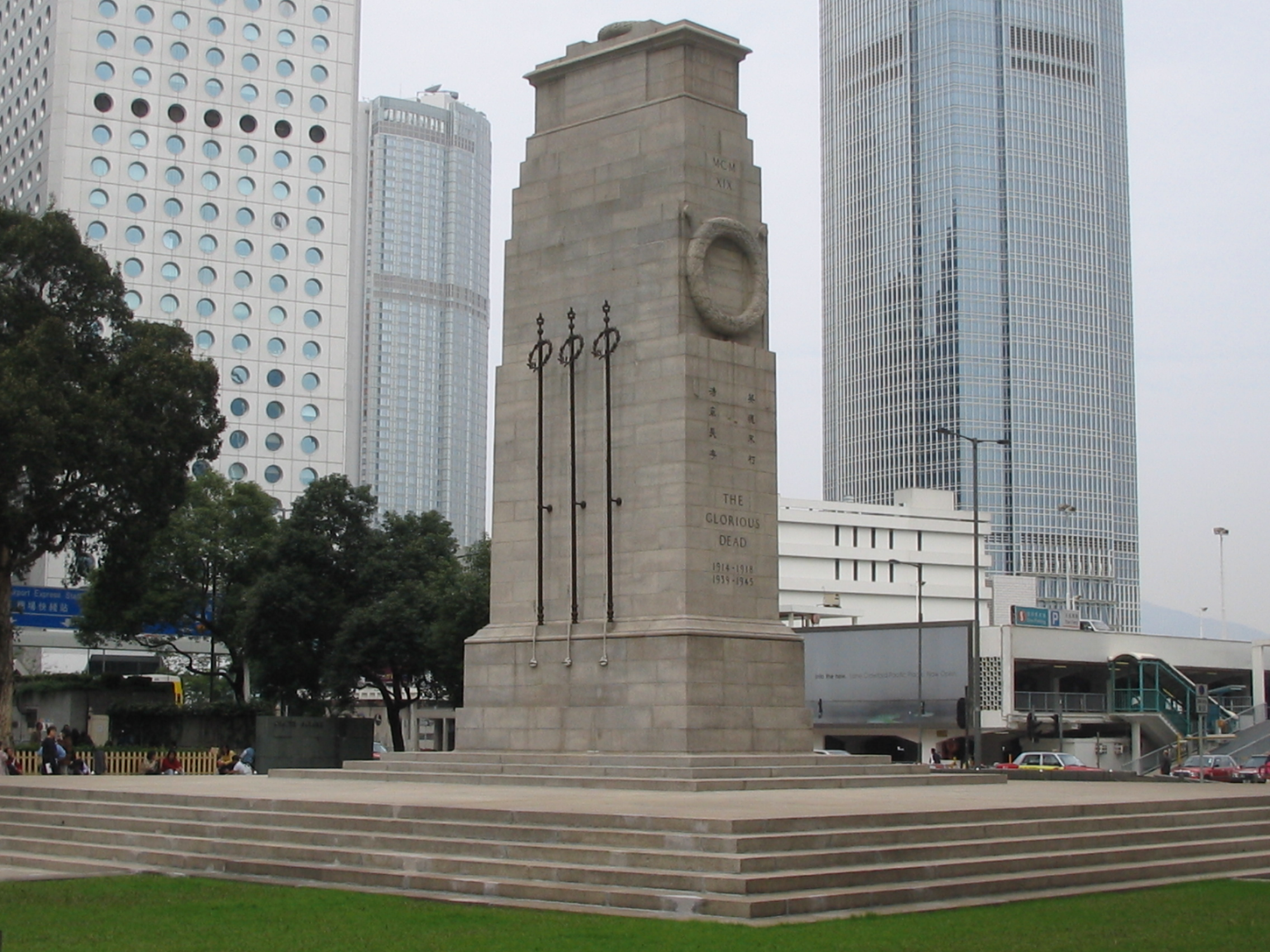
The Cenotaph

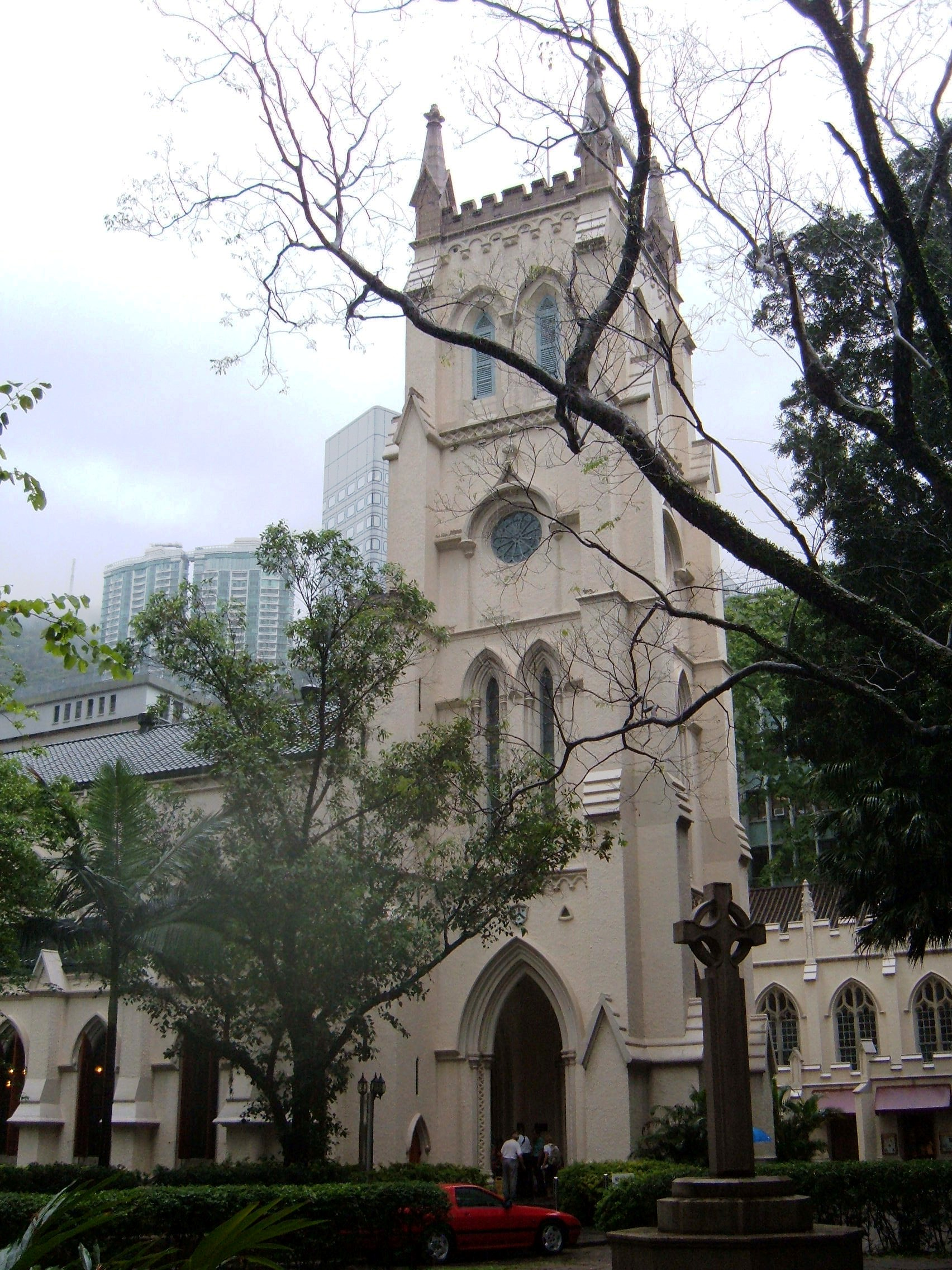
St. John's Cathedral

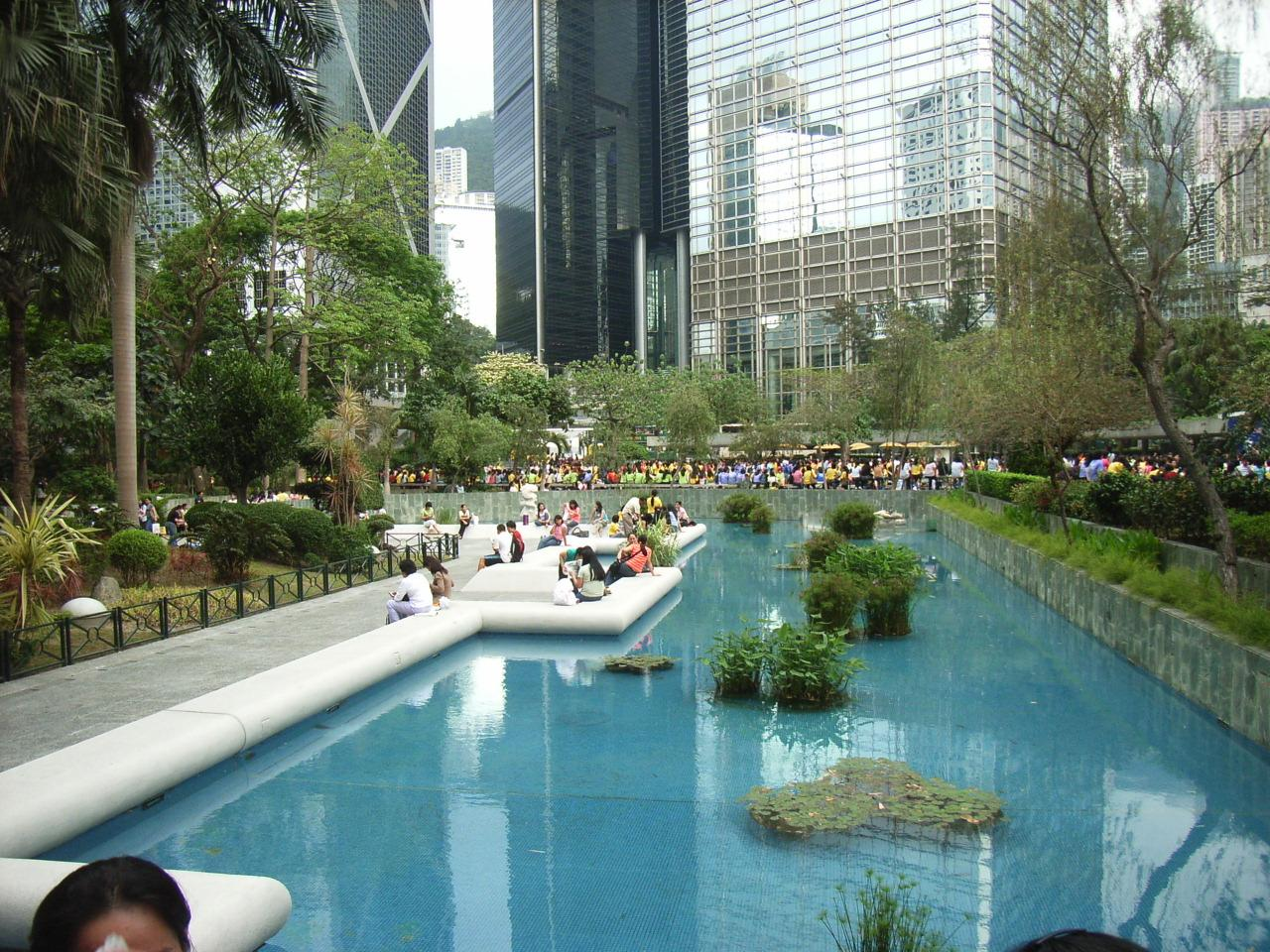
Chater Garden

- Central Government Complex, Tamar
- Chinese People's Liberation Army Forces Hong Kong Building (Admiralty)
- Commissioner's Office of China's Foreign Ministry in the Hong Kong S.A.R. (Mid-Levels)
- Court of Final Appeal Building, housing the Hong Kong Court of Final Appeal
- City Hall
- Justice Place on Government Hill
- General Post Office, Hong Kong
- Government House
- Hong Kong Planning and Infrastructure Exhibition Gallery
- Legislative Council Complex

=== Other historical buildings ===
- Bishop's House
- Central Market
- Central Police Station
- Dr Sun Yat-sen Museum
- Duddell Street Steps and Gas Lamps
- Flagstaff House
- Former Central Magistracy
- Former French Mission Building
- Hong Kong Visual Arts Centre
- Old Dairy Farm Depot, housing the Hong Kong Fringe Club and the Foreign Correspondents' Club
- Pedder Building
- The Cenotaph
- The Helena May main building
- Victoria Prison
- Zetland Hall
- Central and Western Heritage Trail
- Dr Sun Yat-sen Historical Trail

=== Hotels ===
Central, together with Tsim Sha Tsui and Tsim Sha Tsui East, is home to many hotels.

- Four Seasons Hotel Hong Kong (IFC)
- Landmark Mandarin Oriental (The Landmark)
- Mandarin Oriental (Connaught Road Central)
- The Murray, Hong Kong

=== Entertainment areas ===
- Lan Kwai Fong, the location of numerous bars, restaurants and clubs
- Hong Kong Maritime Museum, Central Ferry Pier 8
- SoHo, Hong Kong
- Wyndham Street
- Central Harbourfront
- Central Market
- Tai Kwun
- PMQ

=== Places of worship ===
- Various Buddhist temples
- St. John's Cathedral (Sheng Kung Hui, Anglican Church)
- First Church of Christ Scientist
- Union Church
- Immaculate Conception Cathedral, Hong Kong (Roman Catholic)
- St. Joseph's Church (Roman Catholic)

=== Parks ===
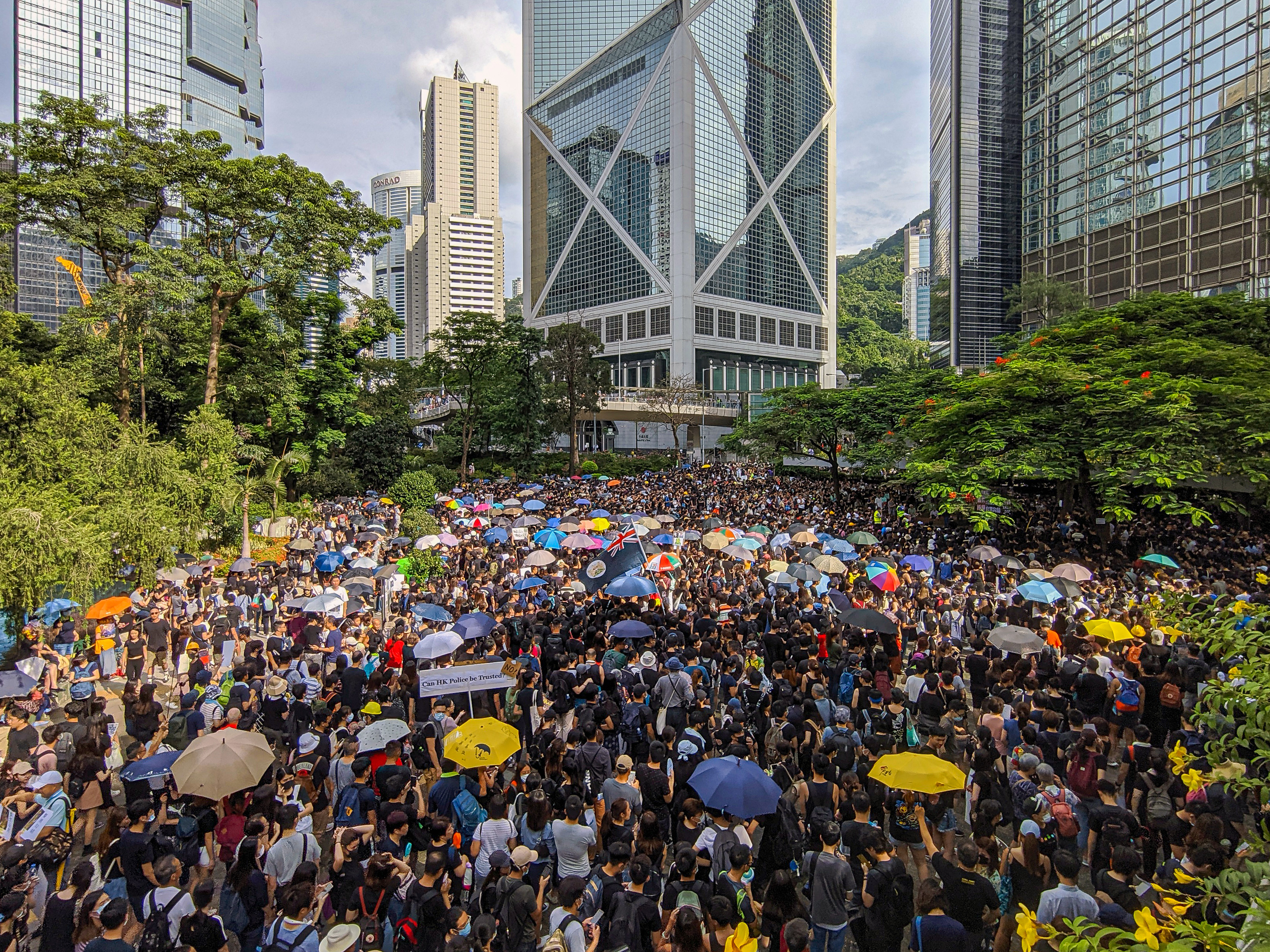
Protesters in Chater Garden on 28 July 2019

- Chater Garden
- Cheung Kong Park
- Hong Kong Park, former location of the Victoria Barracks
- Hong Kong Zoological and Botanical Gardens
- Statue Square

=== Private members' club ===
- Hong Kong Club
- American Club, Hong Kong
- Chariot Club
- China Club
- Club Lusitano
- Foreign Correspondents' Club (Hong Kong)
- Ladies Recreation Club (Mid-Levels)
- The Chinese Club
- The Helena May
- The Hong Kong Bankers Club
- The Sports Club (Hong Kong)

=== Education ===
- Raimondi College
- Sacred Heart Canossian School
- St Joseph's College, Hong Kong
- Ying Wa Girls' School
- St. Paul's Co-educational College
- ESF Glenealy School

Central is in Primary One Admission (POA) School Net 11. Within the school net are multiple aided schools (operated independently but funded with government money) and the following government schools: Bonham Road Government Primary School and Li Sing Primary School (李陞小學).

Hong Kong Public Libraries operates City Hall Library in Central.

=== Officially Recognised Bodies, Consulate General and Honorary Consulate ===
- European Union Office to Hong Kong and Macao
- Consulate General of Argentina
- Consulate General of Austria
- Consulate General of Belgium
- Consulate General of Finland
- Consulate General of Hungary
- Consulate General of Ireland
- Consulate General of Japan
- Consulate General of Kazakhstan
- Consulate General of Panama
- Consulate General of Thailand
- Consulate General of the United States, Hong Kong and Macau
- Consulate General of Uruguay
- Honorary Consulate of Barbados
- Honorary Consulate of Bhutan
- Honorary Consulate of Djibouti
- Honorary Consulate of Estonia
- Honorary Consulate of Latvia
- Honorary Consulate of Liechtenstein
- Honorary Consulate of Lithuania
- Honorary Consulate of Malta
- Honorary Consulate of Mozambique
- Honorary Consulate of Norway
- Honorary Consulate of Papua New Guinea
- Honorary Consulate of Slovenia

=== Chamber of Commerce ===
- The American Chamber of Commerce in Hong Kong
- The Canadian Chamber of Commerce in Hong Kong
- The French Chamber of Commerce and Industry in Hong Kong
- The Australian Chamber of Commerce Hong Kong
- The Portugal-Hong Kong Chamber of Commerce and Industry
- The Chinese General Chamber of Commerce
- The Norwegian Chamber of Commerce in Hong Kong
- The Swiss Chamber of Commerce in Hong Kong

== Former buildings ==
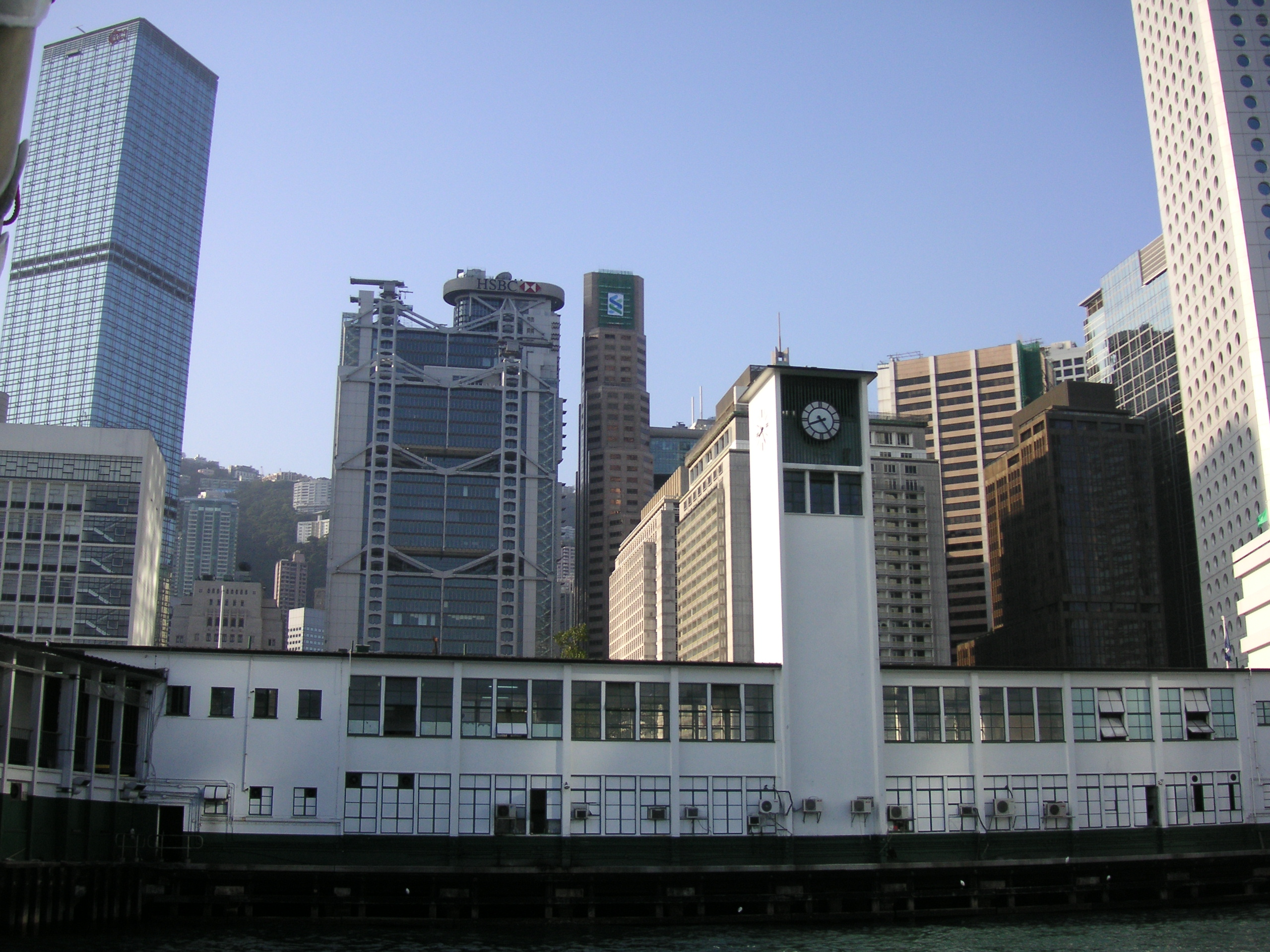
Edinburgh Place Ferry Pier was demolished in 2007.

- Beaconsfield House, demolished in 1995
- Hong Kong Hilton, closed in 1995
- Hongkong Hotel, closed in 1952
- Murray House, part of Murray Barracks, moved to Stanley
- Old Central Government Offices, demolished in 1954
- Wellington Barracks, demolished in 1992
- City Hall Ferry Pier, barge pier, closed due to the Central and Wan Chai Reclamation
- Edinburgh Place Ferry Pier, demolished in 2007
- Blake Pier, Central, demolished, partially moved to Stanley
- Queen's Pier, demolished in 2008
- United Pier, demolished in 1994

== Transport ==
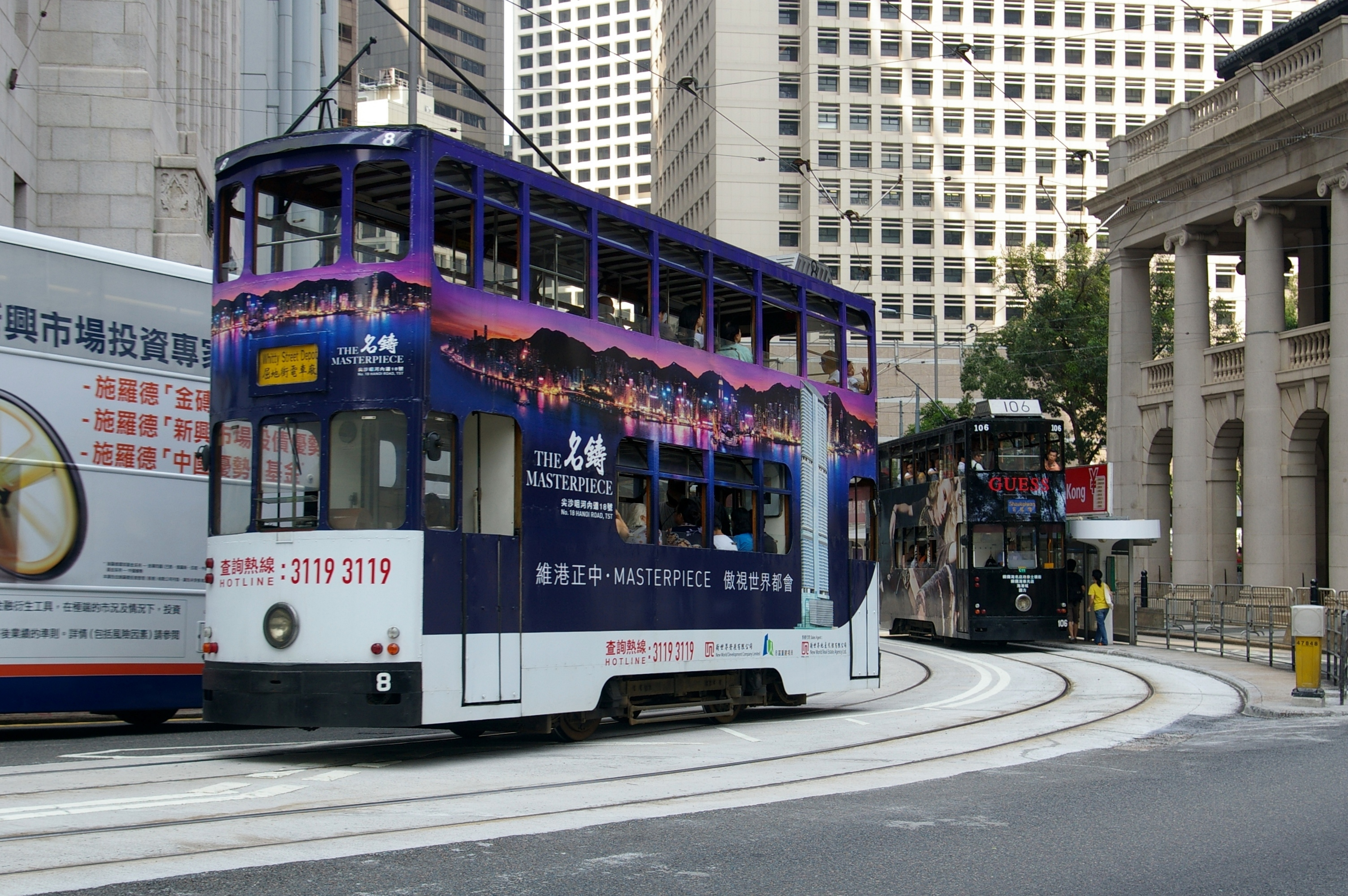
Tram in Central.

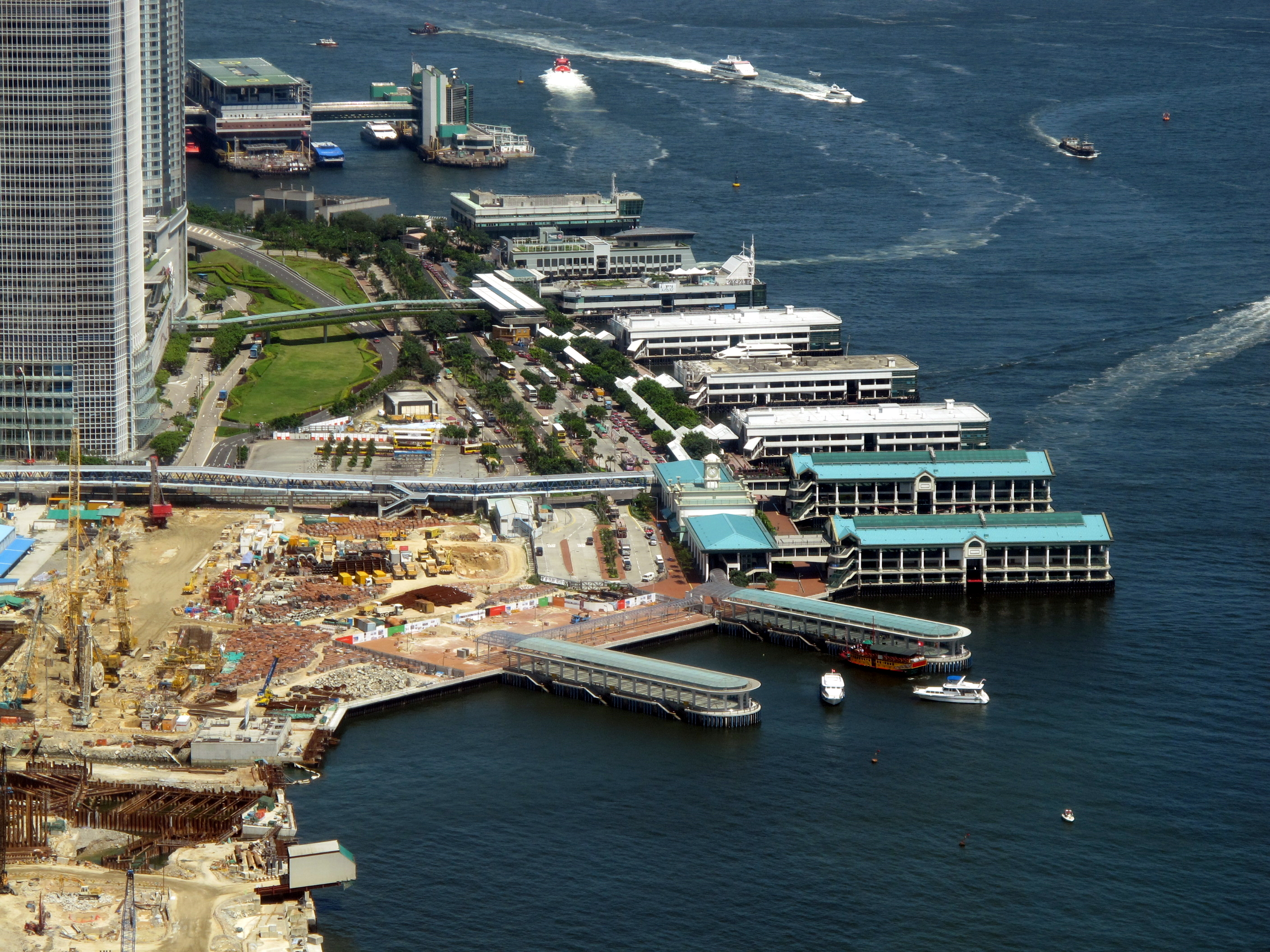
View of the Central Piers.

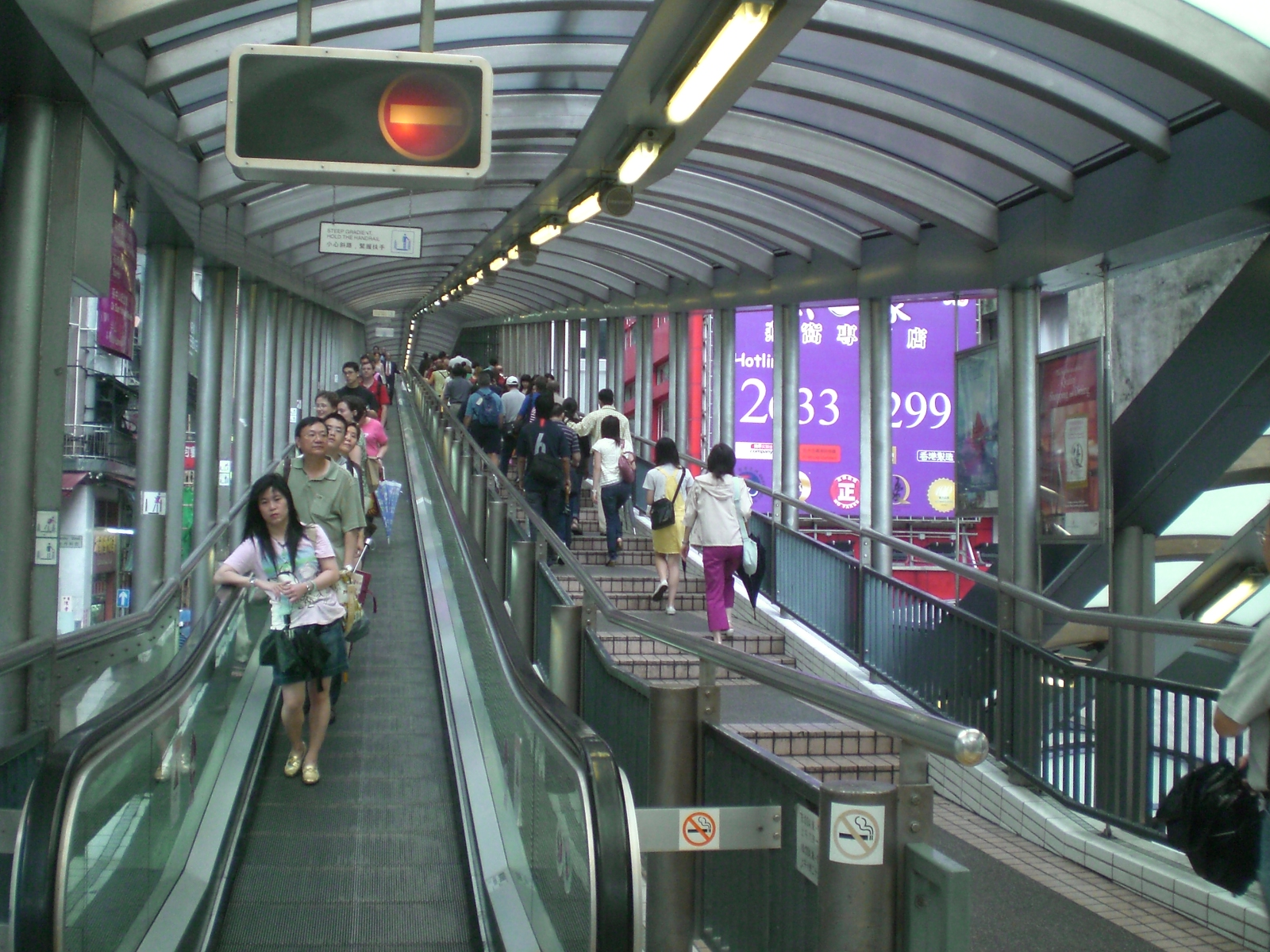
Central–Mid-Levels escalators at Cochrane Street.

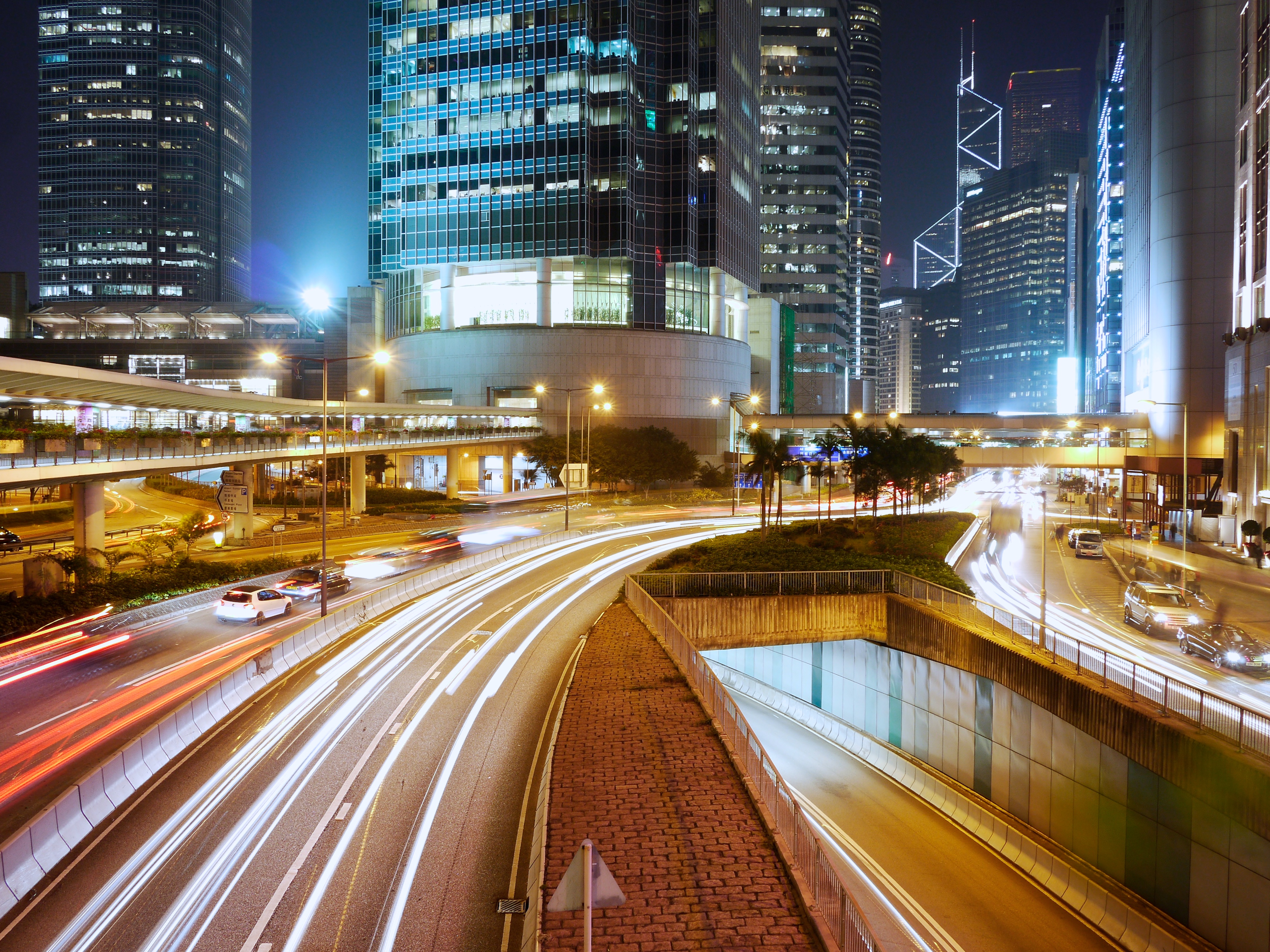
The night view of Connaught Road Central

=== Public transport ===
The area is a major transport hub for Hong Kong (see also Transport in Hong Kong).

- Bus
  - KMB, serving only cross-harbour routes on Hong Kong Island
  - Citybus
- Minibus
- Trains and trams
  - MTR – Island line, Tsuen Wan line, Tung Chung line, Airport Express, South Island line, East Rail line at Sheung Wan, Hong Kong, Central and Admiralty stations
  - Tram
  - Peak Tram
- Ferries
  - Sun Ferry, to Silvermine Bay (Mui Wo), Peng Chau and Cheung Chau
  - Hong Kong & Kowloon Ferry, to Sok Kwu Wan and Yung Shue Wan on Lamma Island
  - Star Ferry, to Tsim Sha Tsui and Hung Hom
  - Discovery Bay Ferry, to Discovery Bay service at Central Pier 3
  - Park Island Ferry
- Ferry piers:
  - Central Piers
  - Star Ferry Pier, Central
- Pedestrian facilities
  - Central Elevated Walkway
  - Central–Mid-Levels escalator

=== Expressways and routes ===
- Route 4
  - Connaught Road Central
  - Central–Wan Chai Bypass

== Climate ==
Climate data for Hong Kong Park (2011–2020) Extremes (2008–present) Sunshine hours (2021–2025)
Month	Jan	Feb	Mar	Apr	May	Jun	Jul	Aug	Sep	Oct	Nov	Dec	Year
Record high °C (°F)	28.4 (83.1)	27.9 (82.2)	30.9 (87.6)	32.3 (90.1)	35.8 (96.4)	34.8 (94.6)	36.0 (96.8)	36.1 (97.0)	35.8 (96.4)	34.2 (93.6)	32.0 (89.6)	29.0 (84.2)	36.1 (97.0)
Mean maximum °C (°F)	25.3 (77.5)	26.4 (79.5)	28.3 (82.9)	30.4 (86.7)	33.2 (91.8)	34.1 (93.4)	34.8 (94.6)	35.2 (95.4)	34.2 (93.6)	32.1 (89.8)	29.6 (85.3)	26.4 (79.5)	35.5 (95.9)
Mean daily maximum °C (°F)	19.6 (67.3)	20.0 (68.0)	22.3 (72.1)	25.8 (78.4)	29.0 (84.2)	31.2 (88.2)	31.8 (89.2)	31.8 (89.2)	31.0 (87.8)	28.6 (83.5)	25.5 (77.9)	21.1 (70.0)	26.5 (79.7)
Daily mean °C (°F)	16.5 (61.7)	17.0 (62.6)	19.4 (66.9)	22.9 (73.2)	26.4 (79.5)	28.5 (83.3)	28.7 (83.7)	28.6 (83.5)	27.8 (82.0)	25.6 (78.1)	22.7 (72.9)	18.0 (64.4)	23.5 (74.3)
Mean daily minimum °C (°F)	14.3 (57.7)	14.9 (58.8)	17.3 (63.1)	20.8 (69.4)	24.4 (75.9)	26.5 (79.7)	26.5 (79.7)	26.2 (79.2)	25.6 (78.1)	23.4 (74.1)	20.7 (69.3)	15.7 (60.3)	21.4 (70.5)
Mean minimum °C (°F)	8.8 (47.8)	9.8 (49.6)	12.8 (55.0)	16.6 (61.9)	20.3 (68.5)	23.7 (74.7)	24.2 (75.6)	23.7 (74.7)	23.5 (74.3)	19.9 (67.8)	15.6 (60.1)	9.7 (49.5)	7.9 (46.2)
Record low °C (°F)	2.9 (37.2)	6.7 (44.1)	8.4 (47.1)	13.6 (56.5)	16.7 (62.1)	20.3 (68.5)	22.2 (72.0)	22.6 (72.7)	22.2 (72.0)	15.0 (59.0)	10.0 (50.0)	5.8 (42.4)	2.9 (37.2)
Mean monthly sunshine hours	175.4	137.7	149.3	131.6	138.3	129.4	203.8	173.1	202.3	185.5	170.7	172.4	1,969.5
Source: Hong Kong Observatory
