= Francis Bangs =

Francis Bangs may refer to:

- Francis N. Bangs (1828–1885), New York lawyer
- Francis S. Bangs (1855–1920), New York attorney
