= Steven Goldstone =

Steven F. Goldstone (born 1946) has managed Silver Spring Group, a private investment firm, since 2000. From 1995 until his retirement in 2000, Goldstone was chairman and chief executive officer of RJR Nabisco, Inc. (which was subsequently named Nabisco Group Holdings following the reorganization of RJR Nabisco, Inc.). Prior to joining RJR Nabisco, Inc., Goldstone was a partner at the Davis Polk & Wardwell law firm in New York City. He is chairman of the board of ConAgra Foods, Inc. and a director of Greenhill & Co., Retail DNA, Inc., Merck & Co., and New Castle Hotels. Mr. Goldstone also sits on the American Standard Companies board of directors.

Goldstone graduated from University of Pennsylvania and earned a law degree from New York University in 1970. He started his career as an attorney with the law firm Davis Polk & Wardwell.
