= Francis S. Bangs =

American lawyer

Francis Sedgwick Bangs (1855–1920) was a New York City attorney at the firm Bangs, Stetson, Tracey & MacVeagh, and a predecessor to the modern firm Davis Polk & Wardwell.

Bangs was born to attorney Francis N. Bangs and Amelia Frances (Bull) Bangs on December 7, 1855. His younger brother was John Kendrick Bangs. After attending Columbia College and Columbia Law School, Bangs followed in his father's profession. He was admitted to the bar in 1880 and joined his father's firm, Bangs and Stetson. Bangs remained at the firm for fourteen years, when he resigned to become president of the State Trust Company in 1894. He resigned that position four years later to join the investment bank of Kingsley, Mabon & Co. In 1907, he returned to the practice of law at the firm of Gunthrie, Bangs & Van Sinderen.

Outside of his professional career, Bangs was a trustee of Columbia College and a member of the vestry of Trinity Church. He was also a member of the Saint Nicholas Society in the City of New York. He died at home on March 20, 1920 after a brief illness.

== Sources ==
- Howard van Sinderen (1920). "Memorial of Francis Sedgwick Bangs". New York County Lawyers' Association Year Book. pp. 232–234.
