= Samuel Hazard Gillespie Jr. =

American lawyer

- Born: July 12, 1910; Morristown, New Jersey
- Died: March 7, 2011 (aged 100); Nyack, New York

Samuel Hazard Gillespie Jr. (July 12, 1910 – March 7, 2011) was an American lawyer and politician from New York.

== Biography ==
Gillespie was born in Morristown, New Jersey, and attended Yale College (1932) and Yale Law School (1935). He gained experience as the principal assistant for 15 years to former U.S. Solicitor General John W. Davis, and argued four cases in the United States Supreme Court. Gillespie was president of the New York State Bar Association from 1958 to 1959, and U.S. Attorney for the Southern District of New York from 1959 to 1961. While US Attorney he prosecuted the US government's obscenity case against the novel Lady Chatterley's Lover.

Gillespie was senior counsel at Davis Polk & Wardwell in New York City and had been a member of the firm since 1948. At one point in his career he represented a number of actors and actresses including Mary Pickford and Maurice Chevalier. At Davis Polk he worked on the landmark US Supreme Court case Erie Railroad Co. v. Tompkins. He retired in 1980.

Gillespie was a member of the Association of the Bar of the City of New York, Federal and American Bar Associations, the New York County Lawyers Association, the American Judicature Society, the Council on Foreign Relations, and the Skull and Bones society at Yale.

== Recent years ==
He was chairman of the American Skin Association and a member of the Piermont Public Library board of directors. Gillespie was president of the Tappan Zee Preservation Coalition, Inc.

Gillespie and his wife, Frances, were married from 1977 to 1995, and their boat called "the Venture" was taken for a sail up and down the Hudson River, when it was not sailing down the Intracoastal.

== Death ==
Gillespie died of pancreatic cancer on March 7, 2011, at his home in Nyack, New York. He was 100 years old.

== Links ==
- The Most Senior Senior Counsel? A Chat With Hazard Gillespie, blogs.wsj.com, July 14, 2008.

Legal offices
Preceded by Arthur H. Christy (acting)	United States Attorney for the Southern District of New York; 1959–1961	Succeeded by Morton S. Robson (acting)
