= Barry E. Friedman =

American academic

Professor Barry Friedman
- Citizenship: American
- Education: J.D., Georgetown University Law Center, 1982; B.A., University of Chicago, 1978
- Employer: New York University School of Law
- Title: Jacob D. Fuchsberg Professor of Law; Affiliated Professor of Politics; Director, Policing Project

Barry E. Friedman (born January 23, 1958) is an American academic and one of the country's leading authorities on constitutional law, policing, criminal procedure, and federal courts, working at the intersections of law, politics and history. Friedman teaches a variety of courses including Judicial Decision-making, Federal Courts and the Federal System, and Criminal Procedure: Fourth and Fifth Amendments, as well as a seminar on Democratic Policing. He writes about judicial review, constitutional law and theory, federal jurisdiction, judicial behavior, and policing. His scholarship appears regularly in the nation's top law and peer-edited reviews.

His book, The Will of the People: How Public Opinion Has Influenced the Supreme Court and Shaped the Meaning of the Constitution (Farrar, Straus & Giroux, 2009), examines the history of the relationship between popular opinion and the Supreme Court, from 1776 to the present. Along with his co-author Stephen Burbank Friedman co-edited and contributed to Judicial Independence at the Crossroads: An Interdisciplinary Approach, which questions common assumptions about the nature of judicial independence and how it can be protected.

Professor Friedman also co-wrote Open Book: How to Succeed on Exams From the First Day of Law School (Aspen, 2nd ed. 2016), a guide to succeeding in law school for students, with Professor John Goldberg.

Given the interdisciplinary nature of his work, Professor Friedman regularly appears at conferences in law, political science and history. He is the reporter for the American Law Institute's new Principles of Law: Police Investigations, and the founder and Director of NYU Law's Policing Project, which is dedicated to strengthening policing through democratic governance. He is a founder and co-convener of the "roughly biennial" Constitutional Theory Conference. He organizes multi-disciplinary conferences, including one on Modeling Law, and another—done under the auspices of the American Constitution Society – on Reconstruction: America's Second Founding. He presents papers regularly at home and abroad. He was a visiting scholar at the Rockefeller Foundation Study and Conference Center in Bellagio, Italy, and has lectured at the Groupe d'Etudes et de Recherches sur la Justice Constitutionnelle Aix-en-Provence and Sciences-Po in Aix-en-Provence.

Professor Friedman regularly serves as a litigator or litigation consultant in a variety of matters in the federal and state courts. He has represented a wide range of clients, both public and private. He represents both civil liberties claimants and state and local governments. He has been active in the areas of reproductive rights, the jurisdictional allocation of cases between the federal and state courts, and the proper scope of the federal government's commerce power. He has filed a number of amicus briefs with the U.S. Supreme Court.

Professor Friedman created the Academic Careers Program and founded and is now co-director of the Furman Academic Program at New York University School of Law. Both programs are dedicated to preparing young scholars for academic careers. In the past he was involved with the American Judicature Society, was President of the Tennessee Civil Liberties Union, served on the Board of the State and Local Legal Center, and was on the steering committee of New York University's Institute for Law and Society. He was Vice Dean of the New York University School of Law from June 2007 to June 2010.

Professor Friedman graduated from the University of Chicago and received his J.D. degree magna cum laude from Georgetown University Law Center. He clerked for Phyllis A. Kravitch of the U.S. Court of Appeals for the 11th Circuit and also worked as a litigation associate at Davis, Polk & Wardwell in Washington, D.C. He was a professor at Vanderbilt Law School before joining the NYU faculty in 2000. In 1995 he won the Clarence Darrow Award from the ACLU of Tennessee for his work in defense of civil liberties.

== Publications: Books and Edited Volumes ==
- Policing Without Permission (Farrar, Straus & Giroux forthcoming February 2017)
- Open Book: How to Succeed on Exams From the First Day of Law School (Aspen, 2nd ed. 2016) (with John Goldberg)
- The Will of the People: How Public Opinion has Influenced the Supreme Court and Shaped the Meaning of the Constitution (Farrar, Straus & Giroux 2009)
- Judicial Independence at the Crossroads: An Interdisciplinary Approach (Sage 2002) (co-editor Stephen B. Burbank)

== Recent Opinion Pieces ==
- Obamacare is Doomed! Everybody Panic! Slate (November 10, 2014) (with Dahlia Lithwick)
- What's Left? (Part 3) Reader Suggestions on the Progressive Agenda Slate (July 17, 2013) (with Dahlia Lithwick)
- What's Left? (Part 2) Our Progressive-- and Popular-- Wish List Slate (July 3, 2013) (with Dahlia Lithwick)
- What's Left? Have Progressives Abandoned Every Cause Save Gay Marriage? Slate (July 1, 2013) (with Dahlia Lithwick)
- The Supreme Court Fails the Fourth Amendment Test. What All the Justices Don't Understand About Police Investigations Slate (June 5, 2013)
- Guns, Pot and State Rights Huffington Post (May 22, 2013)
- Online Alexander Bickel Symposium: Learning About the Supreme Court SCOTUSblog (August 20, 2012)
- Obamacare and the Court: Handing Health Policy Back to the People Foreign Affairs (July 16, 2012)
- Was John Roberts Being Political? At the High Court, Law and Politics Come Together. It’s the Politicization of the Court That Should Make Us Worried Slate (July 2, 2012) (with Dahlia Lithwick)
- Why Are Americans Losing Trust in the Supreme Court? The Nation (June 18, 2012)
- Justice by the Numbers: When it comes to deciding the future of Obamacare, the Supreme Court should ignore public opinion Slate (April 24, 2012) (with Dahlia Lithwick)
- Privacy, Technology and Law New York Times Sunday Review (January 29, 2012)

== Awards and honors ==
- 2011 Podell Distinguished Teaching Award
- 2010 Scribes Book Award Honorable Mention

== Sources ==
- Forbes.com
- http://transcripts.cnn.com/TRANSCRIPTS/0904/15/ldt.01.html
- https://ssrn.com/abstract=678361
- https://www.amazon.com/Will-People-Opinion-Influenced-Constitution/dp/0374220344/ref=sr_1_4?ie=UTF8&s=books&qid=1244191640&sr=1-4
- http://its.law.nyu.edu/facultyprofiles/profile.cfm?personID=19931
- http://blogs.tnr.com/tnr/blogs/the_plank/archive/2009/06/30/why-ricci-should-scare-the-hell-out-of-democrats.aspx
