= Lewis B. Kaden =

American lawyer (died 2020)

Lewis Kaden
- Education: Harvard University (BA, JD)
- Political party: Democratic
- Spouse: Ellen Kaden

Lewis B. Kaden was an American businessman, attorney, legal scholar, and former political advisor who served as vice chairman of Citigroup Inc from 2005 to 2013.

== Early life and education ==
Kaden was raised in Perth Amboy, New Jersey. His father operated a small trucking company. He graduated from Harvard College and Harvard Law School. After he graduated from Harvard Law School, Kaden joined the legislative staff of U.S. Senator Robert F. Kennedy.

== Career ==
By age 26, he was on Kennedy's staff during the senator's four-month run for president, which ended with Kennedy's assassination in 1968. In 1970, Kaden ran as an anti-war candidate in the Democratic primary for the U.S. House of Representatives in New Jersey's 15th congressional district against Representative Edward J. Patten. Kaden is a member of the Committee on Capital Markets Regulation. From 1974 to 1976, he served as counsel to the Governor of New Jersey.

Prior to joining Citigroup, Kaden had spent most of his career in academia and working as a lawyer. He spent 21 years with the law firm of Davis Polk & Wardwell and also taught labor relations and constitutional law as an adjunct professor at Columbia University Law School. For nearly a decade before entering private practice, Kaden was a tenured professor at Columbia University.

In 2017, Kaden joined Baton Systems Inc.

== Personal life ==
He is married to Ellen Kaden.

In June 2020 at the age of 78, Kaden died of injures related to a fall.
