= He Jiuying =

Chinese phonologist

He Jiuying (Chinese: 何九盈; pinyin: Hé Jiǔyíng; born 1932) was a professor at Beijing University Department of Chinese and is an expert on historical Chinese phonology. His son is He Li.

== Biography ==
He Jiuying was born in Anren, Hunan. He graduated from Beijing University in 1961 and then joined the faculty of Beijing University Department of Chinese.

Professor He is a leading expert on ancient Chinese language. His published books include Gu Hanyu Yinyunxue Shuyao (古汉语音韵学述要), Shanggu Yin (上古音), and Zhongguo Gudai Yuyanxue Shi (中国古代语言学史).

== Selected publications ==
- 1991: Historical Chinese Phonology (上古音), Commercial Press, ISBN 7-100-00072-6
- 1995: A History of Chinese Modern Linguistics, Guangdong Education Press, ISBN 7-5406-3399-9; A History of Chinese Ancient Linguistics, Guangdong Education Press, ISBN 7-5406-3400-6
- 2000: The Culture of Chinese Characters, Liaoning People's Press, ISBN 7-205-04500-2.
- 2006: Yuyan Conggao (语言丛稿), Commercial Press, ISBN 7-100-04577-0.
