= Victor Fleischer =

- Spouse: Miranda Perry Fleischer

Academic background
- Education: Columbia University (BA, JD)

Academic work
- Discipline: Tax Law
- Institutions: University of California, Los Angeles; University of Illinois; University of Colorado; University of San Diego; University of California, Irvine

Victor Fleischer is a professor of law at University of California, Irvine School of Law known for raising awareness of the carried interest tax loophole.

== Biography ==
Fleischer grew up in Buffalo, New York, the son of now retired academics, and earned a B.A. from Columbia College in 1993 and a J.D. from Columbia Law School in 1996. He worked at Davis Polk & Wardwell and clerked for the U.S. Court of Appeals for the Fourth Circuit and Ninth Circuit before entering academia in 2001. He taught at the UCLA School of Law, University of Illinois College of Law, University of Colorado Law School, the University of San Diego School of Law, chairing the law school's tax programs, before joining the University of California, Irvine School of Law in 2018. His research has focused on the fields of tax policy and corporate tax.

Fleischer was known for his 2006 article, which highlighted the inequity of the tax treatment whereby private equity firms would classify the money it makes from on the future profits of their deals, also known as "carried interest," as capital gains, rather than as ordinary income, thereby paying a long-term capital gains tax rate that is 17 percentage points lower than the federal income tax rate. He argued that the loophole could cost the government as much as $130 billion over the next decade and said that the private equity industry should pay higher taxes, urging the U.S. government to fix the tax loophole. He was credited for popularizing the concept and turning into a political cause.

In 2016, Fleischer joined the United States Senate Committee on Finance staff as the co-chief tax counsel to the Democratic Party and served in that position until 2017.

== Personal life ==
Fleischer is married to Miranda Perry Fleischer, a professor of tax law at the University of San Diego.
