= He Li =

He Li (Chinese: 何鲤; pinyin: Hé Lǐ; born 15 October 1970) is a partner of Davis Polk & Wardwell, and was a Chinese young poet and the chairman of the China Nationwide High School Students Literature Association (全国中学生文学社联合会).

== Early life and career ==
He Li was born in Beijing. His father is He Jiuying, a professor at Peking University. He was educated at the Affiliated High School of Peking University from 1984 to 1990, and elected as the first Chairman of the China Nationwide High School Students Literature Association in 1989.

He received his A.B. degree from Peking University in 1995, M.A degree from the University of California, Berkeley in 1999, and J.D. degree from Yale Law School in 2003. After graduation, he worked at Davis Polk & Wardwell, an international Law Firm. He was made partner at Davis Polk in 2011. His practice is primarily focused on capital markets.

== Poems ==
He Li began to write poems when he was 13 years old. He became one of notable young poets in the 1980s in China and was popular among many young readers. He published many poems and proses in China Youth Daily, People's Literature, and other newspapers and journals when he was in middle and high schools. In 1988, his poems were published in Selected Poems of the Chinese Child Poets (中国小诗人诗选, ISBN 7-5007-0400-3).

He Li published his first collection of his poems, Shengming de Doudian (生命的逗点, ISBN 7-5301-0220-6), in 1990. Ke Yan, a Chinese poet, wrote the foreword for this book.

He Li's second collection of poems, Chenchuan Hou de Hai (沉船后的海, ISBN 7-80581-707-3), was published in 1993 in The Fourth Generation of Poets Series (第四代诗人丛书).

== Selected publications ==
- 1990: Shengming de Doudian (生命的逗点), Beijing Children Press, ISBN 7-5301-0220-6.
- 1993: Chenchuan Hou de Hai (沉船后的海), Jieli Publishing House, ISBN 7-80581-707-3.
- 2003, "Cong Wenhua dao Baquan" (从文化到霸权, translation of "From Culture to Hegemony" by Dick Hebdige), in Shi Mingdeng haishi Huanxiang (是明灯还是幻象, edited by Han Shaogong and Jiang Zidan), Yunnan People's Press, ISBN 7-222-03433-1.
