= Central Tower =

Central Tower may refer to:

- Central Tower (San Francisco), formerly the Call Building, in San Francisco
- Central Tower (Ulaanbaatar), a skyscraper in Ulaanbaatar
- Central Tower (Warsaw), a skyscraper in Warsaw, Poland, formerly known as ORCO Tower
