= The Helena May main building =

Coordinates: 22.2775°N 114.1584°E

- Traditional Chinese: 梅夫人婦女會
- Cantonese Yale: Mùih fū yàhn fúh néuih wúih jyú làuh
Transcriptions
Yue: Cantonese
- Yale Romanization: Mùih fū yàhn fúh néuih wúih jyú làuh
- Jyutping: Mui4 fu1 yan4 fu5 noei5 wui5 zyu2 lau4

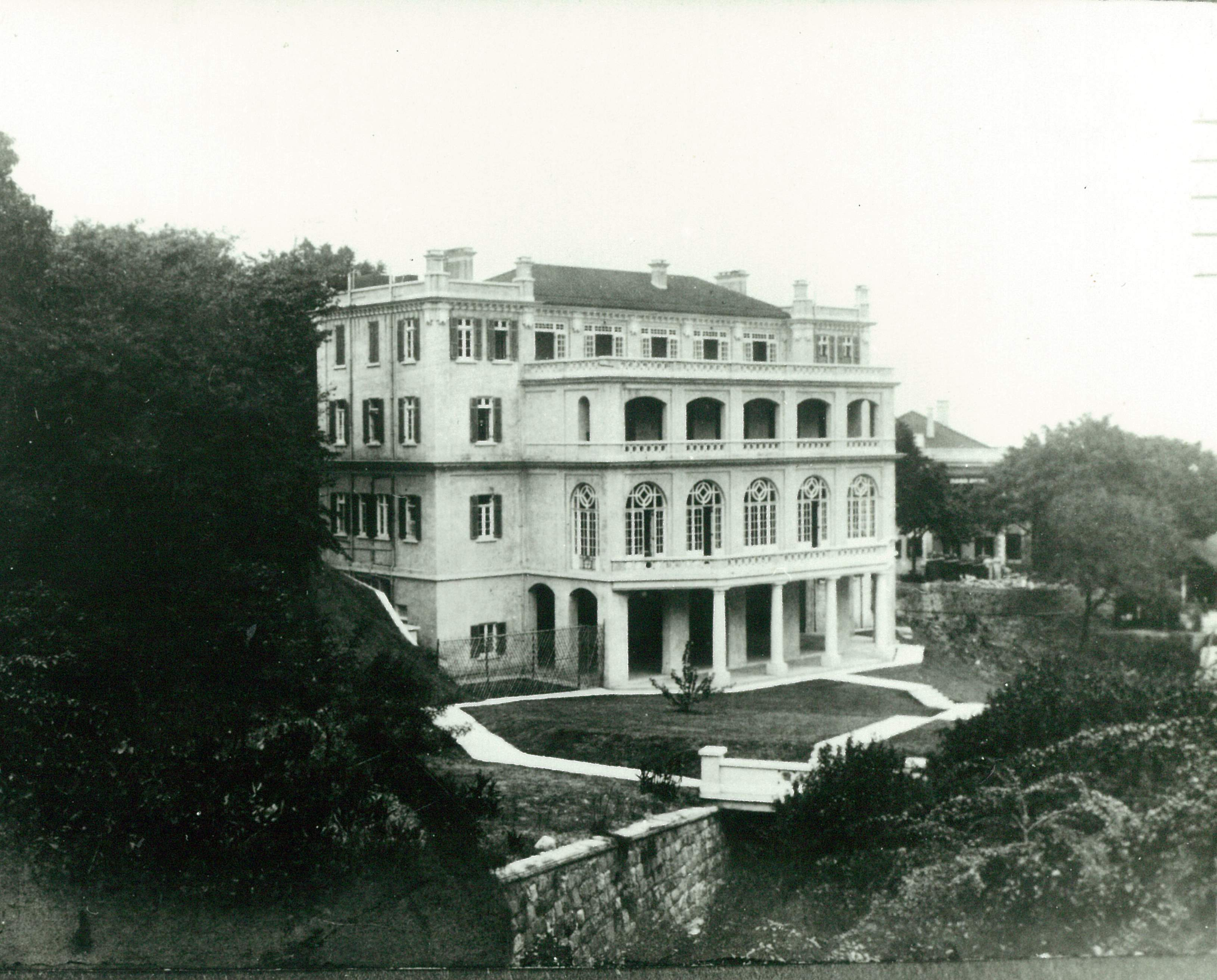
The Helena May in 1916

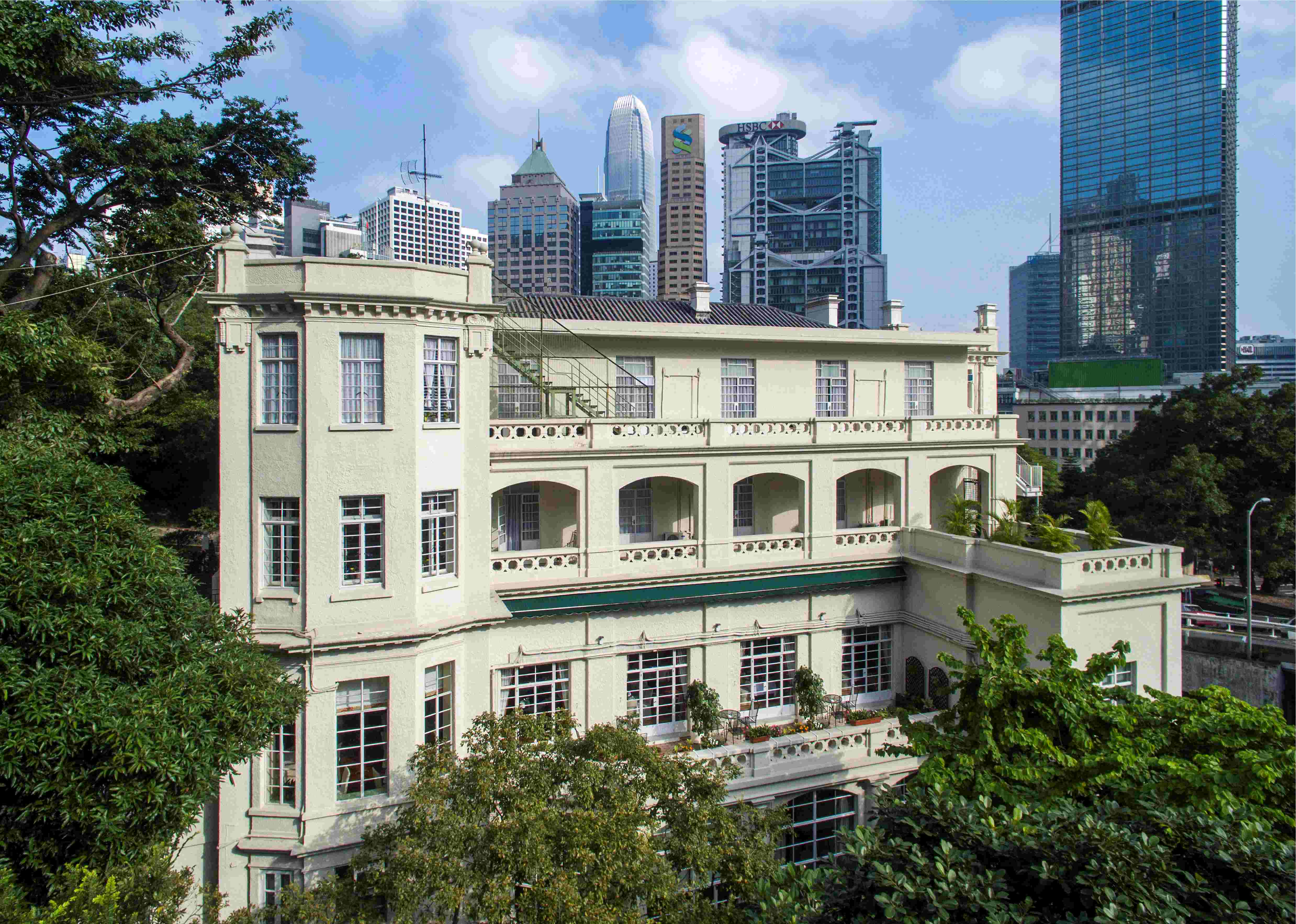
The Helena May in 2025

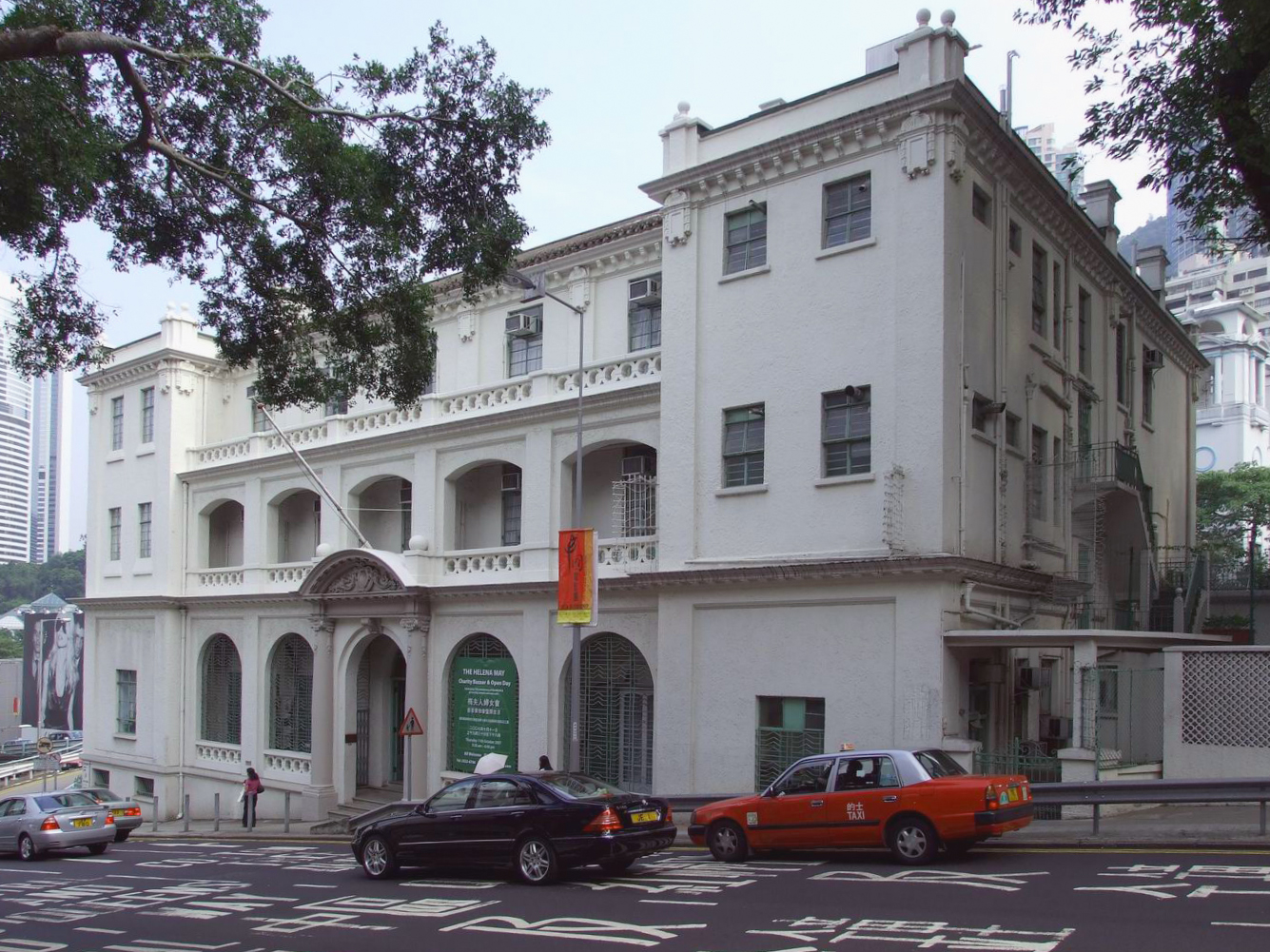
Garden Road facade of the Helena May

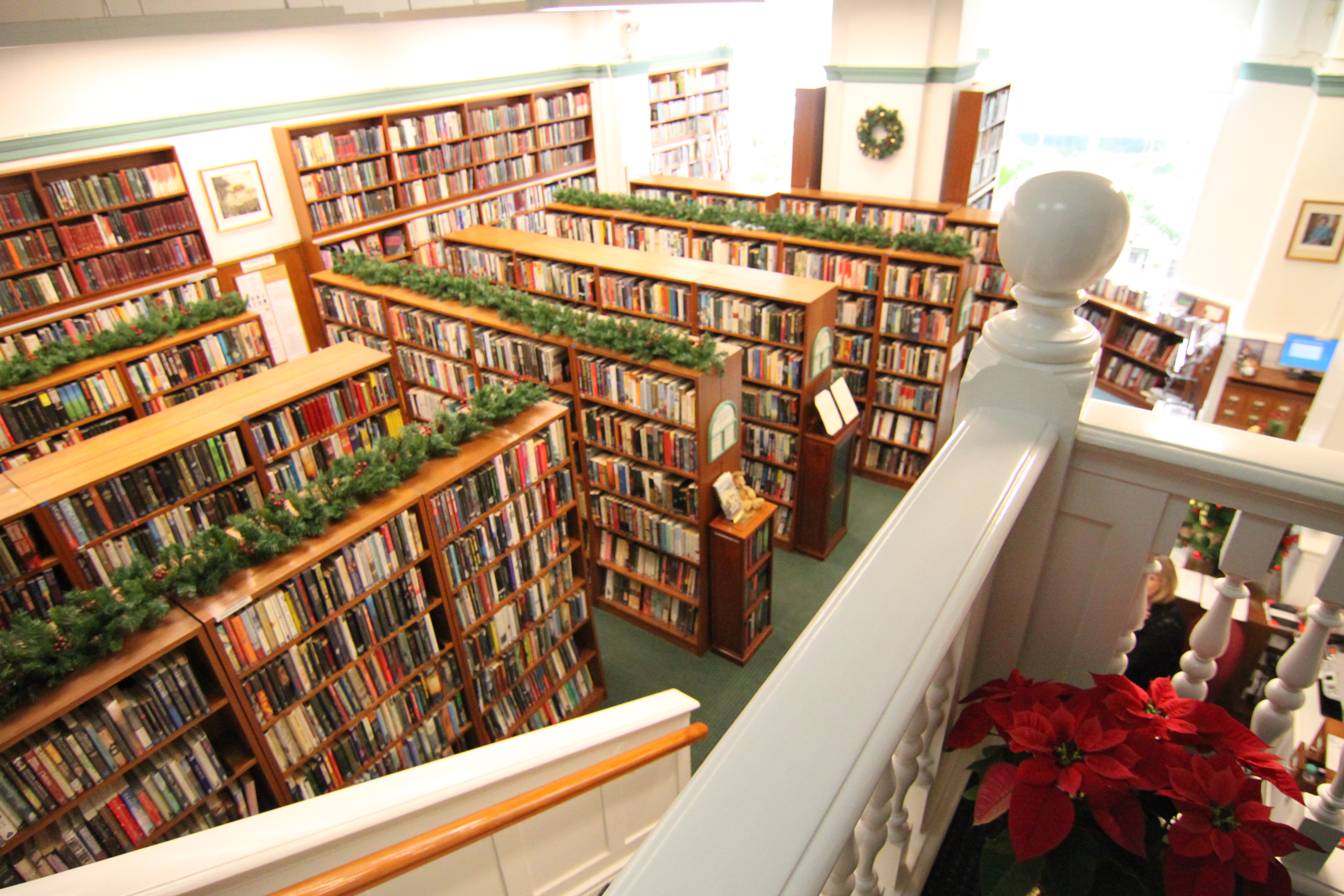
The library

The Helena May is a heritage building in Hong Kong. It is a private members' club located in Central that provides accommodation. It was founded by Helena May.

== History ==
Helena May, the wife of Governor Henry May, understood the need for a safe haven for young single women, as she had four daughters and knew the potential perils of a thriving city such as Hong Kong in the early 20th Century. She initiated the plans to erect such a building, and with the generous donations of two philanthropic businessmen, Sir Ellis Kadoorie and Mr Ho Kom Tong, and many other public donations, its construction was completed in 1916. The building's site at 35 Garden Road was chosen for its proximity to Central and the Peak Tram's lower station.

The exterior of The Helena May main building was declared a Monument – the highest designation for heritage buildings – in 1993. It was built in the Edwardian Classical Revival style with features of other styles such as Beaux-Arts, Baroque and Mannerist. The building is featured on Hong Kong's Heritage Trail.

When the Helena May building (originally called the Helena May Institute) opened, its three stories included an office, a library, rooms where members could read, dine and socialise, bedrooms and the matron's quarters. In its early days, the lower-level rooms opening onto the garden were enclosed and were at various times used as a ballroom and a dining room, and now house the library. Later on, extensions on its north and south sides were constructed to house the offices and increase the number of bedrooms. The area where the tennis court once stood became the Court Building in the late 1950s when citywide accommodation was scarce.

In the 1920s and 1930s, The Helena May became a favoured venue for public music recitals, lectures and dances, due to its spacious Lounge area on the ground floor and convenient location. During World War II, The Helena May was occupied by Japanese troops and its Main Lounge was converted into offices and a short-lived library. The British Royal Air Force requisitioned the building after the war, and it was not until 1947 that the club was up and running as usual. In the following year, 1948, children's dance classes started at the Carol Bateman School of Dancing in the building's basement, and to this day, the School's ballet classes continue there. The Club's library accumulated books once again and has become the largest private English language library in Hong Kong, with approximately 25,000 books covering a wide variety of genres. It is located at the basement level, adjacent to the garden, and includes a section dedicated to children's books.

Over the past half century, the club has retained its purpose and expanded its membership, activities, and dining facilities, as well as increased its charitable donations and outreach programs. Its heritage building has also become a favoured venue for weddings and receptions.
