= Francis N. Bangs =

American lawyer

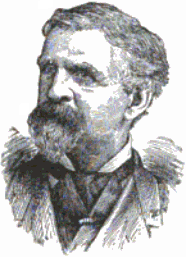
- Born: Francis Nehemiah Bangs; February 23, 1828; New York, New York
- Died: November 30, 1885 (aged 57); Ocala, Florida
- Resting place: Green-Wood Cemetery
- Education: New York University; Yale University
- Occupation: Lawyer
- Children: Francis S. Bangs; John Kendrick Bangs

Francis Nehemiah Bangs (February 23, 1828 – November 30, 1885) was an American lawyer who founded the Wall Street law firm Davis Polk & Wardwell.

== Biography ==
Bangs was born in New York City in 1828. His father, Nathan Bangs, was a well-known Methodist minister from Stratford, Connecticut. He studied at New York University and Yale Law School, where he graduated in 1847. He joined the bar in 1849 and practiced law with several partners before ultimately partnering with Francis Lynde Stetson to form the law firm Bangs & Stetson, a precursor to the modern firm of Davis Polk & Wardwell. Despite lifelong health problems, he developed a prosperous practice in New York representing large business interests, and came to prominence after being appointed counsel to the assignee of the dissolved law firm of Ketchum, Son & Co. in 1853. His practice grew further with the passage of the Federal Bankruptcy Act of 1867, the first bankruptcy act to cover corporations as well as individuals. He was a founding member of the New York City Bar Association, and its president from 1882 to 1883. His was the father of attorney and banker Francis S. Bangs and author and satirist John Kendrick Bangs.

Francis N. Bangs died in Ocala, Florida on November 30, 1885. He was buried at Green-Wood Cemetery.
