= Davis Polk =

International law firm headquartered in New York City

Davis Polk & Wardwell LLP
- Headquarters: 450 Lexington Avenue; New York City
- No. of offices: 10
- No. of attorneys: 1,237 (2025)
- Major practice areas: Capital markets; Corporate/M&A; Financial services regulation; Investment management; Private equity; Litigation; Insolvency/restructuring; Antitrust; Credit/financing; Tax
- Key people: Neil Barr, Managing Partner
- Revenue: US$3.2 billion (2025)
- Profit per equity partner: US$9.8 million (2025)
- Date founded: 1849; 177 years ago
- Company type: Limited liability partnership
- Website: davispolk.com

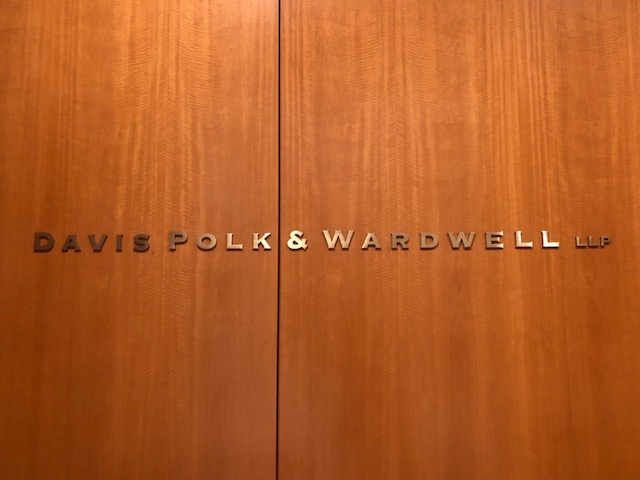
At the offices of Davis Polk & Wardwell LLP in New York, New York.

Davis Polk & Wardwell LLP is an American multinational law firm headquartered in New York City with offices in Washington, D.C., Los Angeles, Redwood City, California, London, Madrid, Brussels, Hong Kong, Beijing, Tokyo, and São Paulo. The firm is recognized for its work in corporate law, litigation, tax, and financial regulation. Davis Polk operates as an all-equity partnership.

== History ==
Davis Polk began as a solo practice in Manhattan opened by a 21-year-old lawyer, Francis N. Bangs. The firm changed its name several times to account for new partners, using names such as Bangs & Stetson; Bangs, Stetson, Tracey & MacVeagh, Stetson, Jennings & Russell, and Davis, Polk, Wardwell, Gardiner & Reed. Towards the end of the 19th century, J. P. Morgan hired Francis Stetson, then name partner of the firm, as his chief counsel. During Stetson's tenure, the firm helped Morgan to restructure the Pennsylvania Railroad as well as create General Electric. The modern incarnations of Morgan's business, JPMorgan Chase and Morgan Stanley, have remained key clients of the firm. Among other high-profile lawyers, President Grover Cleveland served as a member of the firm during the interval between his two non-consecutive presidential terms.

From 1945 to 1965, Davis Polk was known amongst legal circles as a White-Anglo-Saxon-Protestant (WASP) law firm that would not hire Jewish attorneys.

In 1971, Lydia Kess was the first woman to be promoted to partner, becoming the second female partner at a major Wall Street law firm.

During the 2008 financial crisis, the firm represented many government clients, including the United States Department of the Treasury and the Federal Reserve Bank of New York, and the firm had important roles in the AIG, Freddie Mac, Lehman Brothers, and Citigroup matters, as well as in the drafting of the Dodd–Frank Act.

In 2009, to bolster its financial regulatory practice, the firm hired three former Securities and Exchange Commission officials: Commissioner Annette Nazareth, Director of Enforcement Linda Chatman Thomsen, and Deputy Director of Trading and Markets Robert Colby—as well as former White House Staff Secretary Raul Yanes and former Federal Deposit Insurance Corporation General Counsel John Douglas.

In November 2023, amid a wave of protests calling for a ceasefire in the Gaza war at elite U.S. law schools, Davis Polk & Wardwell was among a group of major law firms who sent a letter to top law school deans warning them that an escalation in incidents targeting Jewish students would have corporate hiring consequences: "We look to you to ensure your students who hope to join our firms after graduation are prepared to be an active part of workplace communities that have zero tolerance policies for any form of discrimination or harassment, much less the kind that has been taking place on some law school campuses." The letter was criticized by a coalition of Muslim bar associations, which accused the firms of contributing to Islamophobia, a chilling effect of free speech and Pro-Palestine speech, and a climate of fear.

In January 2025, Neil Barr, chair and managing partner of Davis Polk, discussed the rationale behind the firm's switch from a pure lock-step compensation model to a more performance-based system. He emphasized that increased employee mobility required a compensation structure tied to incentives and firm cohesion, an effort to balance market competitiveness with maintaining firm culture.

In April 2026, Davis Polk & Wardwell announced plans to open an office in Los Angeles, with the head of Skadden, Arps, Slate, Meagher & Flom's Los Angeles office, Jason Russell, recruited to lead the new location.

=== Defense of segregation ===
John W. Davis's legal career at Davis Polk is most remembered for his final appearance before the Supreme Court, in which he unsuccessfully defended the "separate but equal" doctrine in Briggs v. Elliott, a companion case to Brown v. Board of Education. Davis, as a defender of racial segregation and state control of education, argued that South Carolina had shown good faith in attempting to eliminate any inequality between black and white schools and should be allowed to continue to do so without judicial intervention. He expected to win, most likely through a divided Supreme Court, even after the matter was re-argued after the death of Chief Justice Fred M. Vinson. After the Supreme Court unanimously ruled against his client's position, he returned the $25,000 (equivalent to $300,000 in 2025), that he had received from South Carolina, although he was not required to do so, but kept a silver tea service that had been presented to him. It has also been reported that he never charged South Carolina in the first place. He declined to participate further in the case, as he did not wish to be involved in the drafting of decrees to implement the Court's decision.

In Guinn v. United States, as Solicitor General, while he argued against the legality of the "grandfather clause", he conceded the illegality of the literacy tests, which was used to disenfranchise African Americans and others.

=== Representation of Purdue Pharma ===
As of 2025, Davis Polk presently represents Purdue Pharma as the lead counsel for its bankruptcy proceedings. Purdue filed for bankruptcy in September 2019 to deal with its debts from thousands of lawsuits alleging that Purdue was responsible for the opioid epidemic and more than a million overdose deaths as a result of its marketing of Oxycontin as less addictive than it was in reality.

Purdue retained Davis Polk in March 2018, and its representation was critical to reaching a settlement that released the Sackler family, owners of Purdue Pharma, from any potential liability related to opioid claims in exchange for relinquishing all of their equity in Purdue and making a $4.275 billion payment into a claims trust for opioid claimants.

Although the Sackler family is not a debtor in the bankruptcy proceeding, the bankruptcy plan is structured to protect the Sacklers from future civil litigation. An analysis commissioned by Davis Polk found that the Sackler family took $10.3 billion in net cash distributions out of Purdue between 2008 and 2019.

As of March 2025, a New York bankruptcy judge has approved $246 million in legal fees for Davis Polk. The firm has requested another $12.2 million for its work from September 2024 to January 2025.

== Recognition ==
In March 2007, Gay Men's Health Crisis (GMHC) awarded Davis Polk its Heroes Honors 25th Anniversary Award for the corporate pro bono work the firm has done on the organization's behalf.

In 2010, Davis Polk was ranked third in Revenue per Lawyer by the American Lawyer's top 100 National Firms. In 2012 and 2013, Davis Polk was named America's Law Firm of the Year by the International Financial Law Review.

The firm placed 15th on The American Lawyer's 2021 AmLaw 200 ranking, and, on the 2021 Global 200 survey, Davis Polk ranked as the 20th highest grossing law firm in the world.

In 2024, Davis Polk was recognized as a top international law firm in five practice areas at China Business Law Journal’s 2024 China Business Law Awards.

== Notable attorneys and alumni ==
=== Current attorneys ===
Among its current partners and counsel are:

- Uzo Asonye – former Deputy Chief of the Financial Crimes and Public Corruption office of the Eastern District of Virginia and member of the office of special counsel Robert Mueller
- Jon Leibowitz – former chairman, Federal Trade Commission
- Gary Lynch – former director, Enforcement Division, Securities and Exchange Commission, and former vice-chairman and Chief Legal Officer, Morgan Stanley, former vice-chairman, Credit Suisse, and former Global General Counsel, Bank of America
- Neil MacBride – former U.S. Attorney, Eastern District of Virginia
- Annette Nazareth – former commissioner, Securities and Exchange Commission
- Kannon Shanmugam - former Partner at Paul, Weiss, Rifkind, Wharton & Garrison
- Howard Shelanski – former administrator, Office of Information and Regulatory Affairs
- Linda Chatman Thomsen – former director, Enforcement Division, Securities and Exchange Commission

=== Former attorneys ===
==== Judiciary ====
- Ronnie Abrams – U.S. District Court Judge, Southern District of New York
- Thomas J. Aquilino – Senior Judge, U.S. Court of International Trade
- Richard M. Berman – U.S. District Court Judge, Southern District of New York
- Miriam Goldman Cedarbaum – Senior U.S. District Court Judge, Southern District of New York
- Denny Chin – U.S. Circuit Court Judge, Second Circuit Court of Appeals
- Hardy Cross Dillard – International Court of Justice
- Warren Eginton – Senior U.S. District Court Judge, District of Connecticut
- Thomas P. Griesa – Senior U.S. District Court Judge, Southern District of New York
- Cheryl Ann Krause – U.S. Circuit Court Judge, Third Circuit Court of Appeals
- J. Michael Luttig – former U.S. Circuit Court Judge, Fourth Circuit Court of Appeals
- Amy J. St. Eve – U.S. Circuit Court Judge, Seventh Circuit Court of Appeals
- Louis L. Stanton – Senior U.S. District Court Judge, Southern District of New York
- John M. Walker Jr. – U.S. Circuit Court Judge, Second Circuit Court of Appeals
- Lawrence Edward Walsh – former U.S. District Court Judge, Southern District of New York

==== Elected office ====
- John Danforth – former U.S. Senator (R-MO) and Ambassador to the United Nations
- Kirsten Gillibrand – U.S. Senator (D-NY)
- Ben McAdams – U.S. Representative, Utah's 4th congressional district
- Terri Sewell – U.S. Representative, Alabama's 7th congressional district
- Chen Show Mao – Member of Singaporean Parliament, Aljunied Group Representation Constituency, Workers' Party of Singapore
- Mondaire Jones – former U.S. Representative, New York's 17th congressional district
- Zellnor Myrie - New York State Senator, New York's 20th State Senate district

==== Law enforcement and financial regulation ====
- Jerome Powell – chairman of the Federal Reserve
- Randal Quarles – vice-chairman for Supervision, Federal Reserve
- Paul S. Atkins – former commissioner, Securities and Exchange Commission
- Roger W. Ferguson Jr. – former vice-chairman, Federal Reserve System; President & CEO, TIAA-CREF
- Robert B. Fiske – Former U.S. Attorney for the Southern District of New York
- Samuel Hazard Gillespie Jr. – Former U.S. Attorney, Southern District of New York
- Charles E. F. Millard – former director, Pension Benefit Guaranty Corporation
- Ogden Livingston Mills – former Secretary of the Treasury
- Lawrence Edward Walsh – former Deputy Attorney General and Independent Counsel, Iran-Contra Investigation
- Kenneth Wainstein – former Assistant Attorney General, National Security Division, Department of Justice, and former Homeland Security Advisor

==== Other government service ====
- John Bridgeland – former director, United States Domestic Policy Council
- John W. Davis – former United States Solicitor General; Democratic Presidential Nominee, 1924
- Reuben Jeffery III – Under Secretary of State for Economic, Business, and Agricultural Affairs, U.S. Department of State
- Charles MacVeagh – former United States Ambassador to Japan
- Richard Moe – president, National Trust for Historic Preservation
- Frank Polk – former acting U.S. Secretary of State
- Peter Tufo – former United States Ambassador to Hungary
- John E. Zuccotti – former deputy mayor, New York City; namesake of Zuccotti Park

==== Business ====
- Alexander Cushing – founder and chairman, Ski Corporation
- Eli Whitney Debevoise – founding partner, Debevoise & Plimpton
- Tom Glocer – CEO, Thomson Reuters
- Steven Goldstone – former president & CEO, RJR Nabisco
- Robert Harrison – CEO, Clinton Global Initiative
- Lewis B. Kaden – vice chairman, Citigroup
- H. F. Lenfest – founder, Lenfest Communications
- Charles Li – Chinese banker, former CEO of Hong Kong Stock Exchange
- J. Michael Luttig – general counsel, Boeing
- Axel Miller – chairman & CEO, Dexia S.A.
- Jennifer Gillian Newstead - general counsel, Meta Platforms and Apple Inc.
- David Schwimmer – CEO, London Stock Exchange
- Francis Lynde Stetson – Attorney for John Pierpont Morgan; former president, New York State Bar Association.
- Andrew Yang – entrepreneur, founder of Venture for America, and 2020 presidential candidate
- Reshma Saujani – founder of Girls Who Code

==== Media and entertainment ====
- He Li – Chinese poet

==== Academia ====
- George Bermann – director, European Legal Studies Center, Columbia Law School
- Charles Black – professor, Yale Law School
- Brian Casey – president, Colgate University
- Noah Feldman – professor, Harvard Law School
- Victor Fleischer – professor, University of California, Irvine School of Law
- Barry E. Friedman – vice dean, New York University School of Law
- Linda Lorimer – vice president, Yale University
- Jane B. Korn – dean, Gonzaga University School of Law
- Julie O'Sullivan – professor, Georgetown University Law Center
- Saule Omarova – professor, University of Pennsylvania Carey Law School
- Jeannie Suk – professor, Harvard Law School
- David Schizer – professor & dean, Columbia Law School
- David E. Van Zandt – president, The New School, Former Dean, Northwestern University School of Law

== See also ==
- List of largest law firms by profits per partner
- White shoe firms
