= Peter Lam =

Hong Kong businessman

The Honourable Peter Lam GBM GBS
- 林建岳
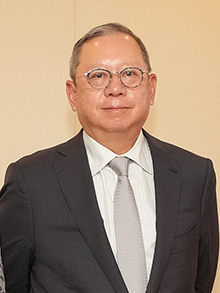
- Lam in 2022
- Born: Lam Kin-ngok; 7 August 1957 (age 69); Hong Kong
- Education: University of Oregon
- Occupation: Businessman
- Spouse(s): Hsieh Ling-Ling (1980－1995)
- Relatives: Pearl Lam (sister); Lim Por-yen (father)

Peter Lam Kin-ngok, GBM GBS (Chinese: 林建岳, born 7 August 1957) is a Hong Kong businessman and billionaire who has developed a reputation in Hong Kong's business, media, and entertainment industry, as well as in Asia's hospitality and food and beverage industries.

Lam is the son of the late industrialist tycoon Lim Por-yen and his second wife U Po-chu. He is chairman of Lai Sun Development Company, Lai Fung Holdings, Hong Kong Tourism Board, and a director of e-Sun Holdings. In 2019, he became chairman of the Hong Kong Trade Development Council (HKTDC). Lam also owns Media Asia Entertainment Group.

In 2008, Lam established Lai Sun Dining. The group develops and operates high-end culinary concepts locally and abroad. Their portfolio currently encompasses 17 brands, 24 outlets, and 9 Michelin stars, including 3 Michelin-starred 8½ Otto e Mezzo Bombana, Beefbar, and China Tang in London, Hong Kong Landmark, and Harbor City.

== Biography ==
Peter Lam Kin Ngok was born in 1957 in Hong Kong to Teochew parents. He is the son of the industrialist tycoon Lim Por-yen and his second wife, U Po-Chu. He has two brothers, Lam Kin Ming and Matthew Lam. At the age of thirteen, he was sent to Canada for four years of high school at St. George's School, after which he attended the University of Oregon where he graduated in 1987. After his graduation, he returned to Hong Kong to help his father, eventually becoming the vice-chairman of Lai Sun Group.

In 1997, Lam purchased Furama Hotel for HK$6.9 billion to rebuild it even though the idea was strongly opposed by his father Lim Por-yen. It was during that time the Asian economic crisis struck and the property market nose-dived, forcing Lai Sun Group to borrow money from banks, putting them 100 billion Hong Kong dollars in debt.

After this experience, Lam put more focus on his entertainment business. The first step to him becoming an entertainment magnate came in 2002, when the movie produced by his company, Infernal Affairs, enjoyed huge success. In 2004, Lam and Hong Kong singer Leon Lai started a music group, Amusic, which recruited famous Hong Kong singers.

In 2009, Lam supported Sharon Cheung with starting a free movie website, Goyeah.com. This was the first time in Hong Kong that movies were shared online for free. The website's main revenue is from ads.

In 2011, Lam was awarded an honorary doctorate by the Hong Kong Academy of Performing Arts, recognising his contribution to the music & film industries and support to the academy.

On February 22, 2013, the Hong Kong SAR government announced the appointment of Lam as the new chairman of Hong Kong Tourism Board, replacing James Tien. In the same year, Lam was elected by members to the standing committee of the Twelfth CPPCC National Committee.

In December 2021, it was reported that Lam was eligible to vote four times in the 2021 Hong Kong legislative election, yielding 0.0366618% of the total voting value (elected seats), which is 7377 times more than the value of an average voter's total voting value.

== Business ==
Lam is the current chairman of Lai Sun Development, Media Asia Entertainment Group Holdings, the Hong Kong Tourism Board (HKTB), Crocodile Garments, and deputy chairman of Lai Fung Holdings. He received the Gold Bauhinia Star award in 2015 for his outstanding contributions.

=== Lai Sun Group & Hospitality ===
In 1989, Lai Sun Group entered into the hospitality business with several hotel acquisitions and a partnership with the Delta Hotels Group. The partnership expanded Lai Sun Group's access into North America. In the early 1990s, Lai Sun Group expanded into China through the acquisition of the Chains Hotels Group. In 1995, the company was subsequently renamed Lai Sun Hotels International Limited.

The group currently owns and operates the Ocean Park Marriott Hotel in Hong Kong, the Caravelle Hotel in Ho Chi Minh City, Vietnam, and the Fairmont St Andrews in Scotland, as well as Lai Fung Group’s hotel and serviced apartment operations in Shanghai and Hengqin in China.

=== Four Seasons Hotel & The Beverly Wilshire Hotel ===
Starting in 1995, Lai Sun Hotels International Limited continued investments in a number of luxury hotels across its international subsidiaries. The hotels included The Ritz-Carlton, Hong Kong, Four Seasons Hotel New York and the Four Seasons Hotel Milano.

In 1996, the Los Angeles Times reported that the Lai Sun Group had acquired stakes in the Regent Beverly Wilshire Hotel in Los Angeles, USA for a deal estimated to be around USD$100 Million.

=== Ritz-Carlton Hotel, Hong Kong ===
Lai Sun Development (LSD) acquired the Furama Kempinski Hotel's parent company, Furama Hotel Enterprises, in June 1997 for HK$7 billion.

In December 2001, Lai Sun Development, with Lam as CEO, demolished two of its five-star hotels - the Furama Kempinski Hotel, then famous for its revolving restaurant, and The Ritz-Carlton, Hong Kong. In its place, Lai Sun Development built AIG Tower, a 185-metre (607 ft.), 37-storey skyscraper that was completed in 2005. It was renamed AIA Central in 2009.

=== Lai Sun Dining & Restaurants ===
In 2008, Lam established Lai Sun Dining, a Hong-Kong based hospitality group. The group owns and operates high-end culinary concepts locally and abroad. Their portfolio currently encompasses 9 Michelin Stars across 17 brands and 24 outlets, including 3 Michelin Starred 8½ Otto e Mezzo Bombana, China Tang, the China Club, Beefbar, and Cipriani Hong Kong.

=== Global Fair Development Limited ===
In May 2021, Liber Research Community released a report, which included information stating that Lam was a company director at Global Fair Development Limited, a company which allegedly colluded with indigenous villagers to buy small house policy rights and illegally develop them.

== Personal life ==
Lam's father, Lim Por-yen, died in 2005 at the age of 90. He had 8 children, including Peter Lam Kin-ngok, Pearl Lam, Matthew Lam Kin-hong 林建康, and Lam Kin-ming 林建名 who died on January 8, 2021, due to lymphoma.

Lam married Taiwanese actress Hsieh Ling-Ling 謝玲玲 in 1980, the couple had five children, Lester, Emily, Evelyn, Eleanor, and Lucas; Eleanor (林心兒) and Lucas are fraternal twins. The couple filed for divorce in 1993; after two years the couple officially divorced.

Hsieh Ling-Ling and Peter's eldest son, Lester 林孝賢, who graduated from Northeastern University in the United States, is currently the executive director and CEO of Lai Sun Group. In one interview, Lester stated that he admired his father and spoke about how to manage a family business so that he can be considered as the successor of the future Lai Sun Group.

Their eldest daughter, Emily Lam-Ho 林恬兒, graduated with a double degree from the University of Southern California in 2006 and a double masters from Columbia University in New York City in 2016. Emily is the CEO and founder of Empact28, director of business development at Sing Tao Daily News Corporation, and the CEO and co-founder of EcoDrive. She married Kent Ho, son of Charles Ho, in 2014.

In 2000, Lam's then-girlfriend Monica Chen Yi-ping 陳浥萍, a model, socialite, and businesswoman from Taiwan, gave birth to their baby daughter Lyann Angelique Lam 林利兒, his youngest child. When news of their split broke, Lam and Chen issued a joint public statement pleading with the public for space and privacy out of respect for their daughter's young age. She has maintained a relatively private lifestyle despite media interest.

Peter Lam has also been involved in an ongoing legal dispute concerning the estate and wills of his late father, Lim Por-yen, founder of the Lai Sun Group. In April 2025, Hong Kong High Court ruled that a 2004 will signed under what the court described as “highly suspicious circumstances” was invalid, finding that Lim Por-yen lacked the mental capacity to execute it due to moderate-to-severe dementia. In its judgment, the court stated that “the 2004 will was the product of negotiations and jockeying between the beneficiaries, with no involvement of Mr Lim.” The court further found that Lim lacked sufficient “knowledge and approval” of the will’s contents, while legal commentary on the judgment noted that the disputed will had been drafted based on instructions from Peter Lam and a senior Lai Sun Group executive rather than directly from Lim himself. The ruling also reportedly questioned the credibility of certain witnesses supporting the 2004 will. The court reinstated an earlier 1973 will, reshaping the distribution of Lim’s estate by restoring inheritance rights to his third wife, Koo Siu-ying, and daughter Pearl Lam. Peter Lam stated that the ruling would not affect his control or management of the Lai Sun Group.

In August 2026, it was reported that Lim Por-yen’s estate had appealed the 2025 High Court decision invalidating the 2004 will. The appeal challenges, among other matters, the court’s findings on Lim’s testamentary capacity, knowledge and approval of the document.

A July 2026 costs judgment, Hong Kong High Court stated that there was “no dispute” that Peter Lam had funded the proceedings and that he stood to benefit by receiving a greater share of the estate than under the earlier will.

== Politics and public positions ==
=== Hong Kong Tourism Board ===
Lam was appointed the Chairman of the Hong Kong Tourism Board (HKTB) for three years from April 1, 2013, to March 31, 2016, succeeding James Tien Pei-chun. He was further re-appointed the Chairman for three years from April 1, 2016, to March 31, 2019.

=== Our Hong Kong Foundation ===
Lam is a counsellor for the Our Hong Kong Foundation. This foundation is a Hong Kong non-profit organization registered in September 2014, with an aim to promote the long-term interests of Hong Kong through policy research, analysis, and recommendation. Pooling together local, mainland, and international talent, it studies Hong Kong's development needs, offering multidisciplinary public policy recommendations and proposing solutions to foster social cohesion, economic prosperity, and sustainable development.

=== Business and Professionals Alliance for Hong Kong ===
Lam is the council chairman of the Business and Professionals Alliance for Hong Kong, a political party formed in October 2012. The goal of this alliance is to drive Hong Kong's economy forward through commercial and industrial development, and to help improve people's livelihood through its professionalism and dedication. The alliance offers suggestions for the long-term strategic development of Hong Kong and for the well-being of the public.

=== Hong Kong Trade Development Council (HKTDC) ===
In 2019, Lam was appointed chairman of the Hong Kong Trade Development Council (HKTDC).

== Hobbies ==
Lam, who loves cigars, owns a cigar shop in Hong Kong. He reportedly enjoys "Buttman" Batman-based humour T-shirts. He also loves horse racing. He and both of his brothers are members of the Hong Kong Jockey Club where he owns two horses, Go Baby Go and Million Darling. In Million Darling's six appearances, he has been in the top four every single time. Sadly due to a leg injury, Million Darling was forced to retire in 2011, earning a total stake of HK$939,475.

=== Yachts ===
In 2001, Lam became the owner of a 30.5-metre vessel made by San Lorenzo called Sun Princess. The yacht has an estimated cost of US$9 million.

In 2016, Lam was appointed as the chairman of Camper and Nicholson International, a renowned European yacht brokerage and management firm. His eldest son Lester 林孝賢 currently serves on Camper & Nicholson's board of directors.

Lam's passion for yachting developed over decades, as the owner of several yachts in both the Mediterranean and Hong Kong, for which he obtained related licenses and certifications.

==== Sun Princess and SunPrince ====
In 2010, Lam's eldest son Lester hosted a massive birthday party aboard his father's yachts, The Sun Princess and The SunPrince. The party itself is estimated to have cost Lam over HKD $7 million (US$894,000) to host. Despite many attempts to avoid the paparazzi and the media, photographs of the party became front-page news.

== 2008 speeding offence ==
In early 2008, Lam avoided a speeding offence when he successfully challenged the correct use and validity of laser speed detectors by the police. Lam was allegedly clocked at 114 km/h in a 50 km/h zone. He eventually pleaded guilty to driving at 79 km/h, and was fined HK$450.

Political offices
Preceded by James Tien	Chairman of the Hong Kong Tourism Board; 2013–2019	Succeeded by Pang Yiu-kai
