= Lixin =

Lixin may refer to:

- Lixin County, Anhui, China
- Shanghai Lixin University of Accounting and Finance
- Lai Sun (Lixin), Hong Kong conglomerate

== See also ==
- Lai Sun (disambiguation), or Lixin in pinyin
