= Lai Sun (disambiguation) =

Lai Sun is a Hong Kong conglomerate.

Lai Sun may refer to the following subsidiary entities of the group company:

- Lai Sun Development
- Lai Sun Garment
- Lai Sun F.C.
