= Pearl Lam =

Hong Kong gallerist

- Born: 林明珠; Hong Kong
- Occupation: International Gallerist
- Parent(s): Lim Por-yen; Gu Shui-ying
- Relatives: Peter Lam (brother)

Pearl Lam (Chinese: 林明珠) is a Hong Kong-born gallerist and curator. She is known for establishing Pearl Lam Galleries, which has presented Chinese contemporary art and design internationally. The Financial Times has described her as “a powerhouse of China’s art world.”

== Life ==
Pearl Lam was born in Hong Kong to Lim Por-yen, a real estate tycoon and founder of Lai Sun Group. Educated in the United States and the United Kingdom, she studied accountancy and law, but eventually pursued her passion for art and design.

== Career ==
Lam began organising pop-up exhibitions in Hong Kong in the early 1990s. In 2004, she curated Awakening: La France Mandarine, a Franco-Chinese exhibition presented in Shanghai.

In 2005, she founded Contrasts Gallery in Shanghai, later renamed Pearl Lam Galleries, and since 2022 operating as Pearl Lam Limited. The gallery emphasised the relationship between art and design and participated in the inaugural edition of Design Miami at Art Basel.

The Hong Kong branch of Pearl Lam Galleries opened in 2012 in the Pedder Building with a show curated by Gao Minglu. Additional branches were established in Singapore’s Gillman Barracks in 2014 and in Hong Kong’s Sheung Wan in 2015. The gallery has presented exhibitions by artists including Su Xiaobai, Zhu Jinshi, and Maggi Hambling.

In 2008, Lam co-founded the China Art Foundation, which promotes contemporary Chinese art and culture internationally.

== Podcast ==
In 2023, Lam launched The Pearl Lam Podcast, a series of interviews with artists, writers, designers, and cultural figures. Guests have included artist Maggi Hambling, novelist Kevin Kwan, and chef Rasmus Munk. The podcast is available on platforms including Spotify and YouTube.

== Speaking Engagements ==
Lam has participated in international art and culture forums. These have included the Financial Times Business of Art Summit in London (2023), and the Art for Tomorrow conference in Milan (2025).

In 2024, she joined a panel at the 1-54 Contemporary African Art Fair in London on “Bridging Cultures: Promoting African Art in the Asian Market.”

== Recognition ==
- 2008: Named one of 100 Women of the Year by Corriere della Sera
- 2012: Included in the Art Power 100 by L'Officiel Art
- 2012: Featured on the “Design Power” list by Art+Auction
- 2013: Listed among the most powerful women in “Asia’s Women in the Mix” by Forbes magazine.
- 2014: Ranked among the top twenty-five women in the art world by artnet news
- 2016: Featured in “The 2016 Power List: High-Wattage Women of the Art World” by Blouin Art Info
- 2021: Included in Tatler Asia’s list of “Asia’s Most Influential”
- 2023: Named in Prestige Hong Kong’s “Women of Power”
