= Media Asia Entertainment Group =

Hong Kong media company

- Logo used since 2011
- Native name: 寰亞娛樂集團有限公司
- Type: Subsidiary
- Industry: Film & TV Entertainment
- Founded: October 1993; 33 years ago
- Founder: Peter Lam
- Headquarters: 11th Floor, Lai Sun Commercial Centre, 680 Cheung Sha Wan Road, Kwai Chung, Kowloon, Hong Kong
- Area served: Asia
- Key people: Peter Lam (chairman)
- Services: Film production and distribution
- Owner: Peter Lam
- Parent: Lai Sun Development
- Subsidiaries: Media Asia Films
- Website: www.mediaasia.com

Media Asia Entertainment Group
- Traditional Chinese: 寰亞娛樂集團有限公司
- Simplified Chinese: 寰亚娱乐集团有限公司
Transcriptions
Standard Mandarin
- Hanyu Pinyin: Huányà Yúlè Jítuán Yǒuxiàn Gōngsī
Yue: Cantonese
- Yale Romanization: Wàahn A Yùhlohk Jaahptyùhn Yáuhhaahn Gūngsī

Media Asia Entertainment Group (Chinese: 寰亞娛樂集團有限公司, SEHK: 8075) is a Hong Kong production company and film distributor for films made in Hong Kong and throughout China. It is a subsidiary of Lai Sun Development Company Ltd.

== History ==
Headquartered in Hong Kong and listed on the Singapore Exchange Securities Trading Limited Dealing and Automated Quotation System since November 2004, Media Asia is one of Asia's largest Chinese language film studios. The executive officer of the company is John Chong, a co-founder of Media Asia. The chairman of the company is Peter Lam, the younger son of Lim Por-yen, who founded the Lai Sun Group.

Media Asia was also the only international entertainment company listed on the bourse. On 25 June 2007 the Singapore exchange approved the request to delist the company. In August 2007 following a compulsory buyout of minority interests in the company, it was successfully delisted.

== Films ==
Media Asia has produced or co-financed over 50 Chinese language films. These include box-office successes such as Initial D, Wait 'Til You're Older, A World Without Thieves, Magic Kitchen, and the Infernal Affairs trilogy.

Media Asia has a library of over 269 Chinese language films that it distributes to more than 30 major international markets. It has built up a range of output agreements with Asia-leading television channels, including Hong Kong Cable TV (Hong Kong), CCTV-6 (China), Eastern Broadcasting (Taiwan), MediaCorp TV (Singapore) and Celestial Movies (Singapore/Malaysia/Indonesia/Brunei) and has formed a joint-venture with China Film Group for film distribution in China. From 1997 until 2004, it held the pre-1997 Golden Harvest film library with Mega Star handling home video distribution. When Mega Star went into Fortune Star (under Star TV), and with backing 20th Century Fox, it took the rights to the Golden Harvest film catalogue with them.

=== Awards ===
Media Asia's films have won 183 awards and have been nominated more than 250 times at international film awards and at film festivals such as the Berlin International Film Festival, Cannes Film Festival, the Venice Biennale, the Tokyo International Film Festival, the Taipei Golden Horse Film Festival and the Hong Kong Film Awards.
