= Furama Hong Kong Hotel =

Hotel in Central, Hong Kong, 1973–2001

Coordinates: 22.281357°N 114.161908°E

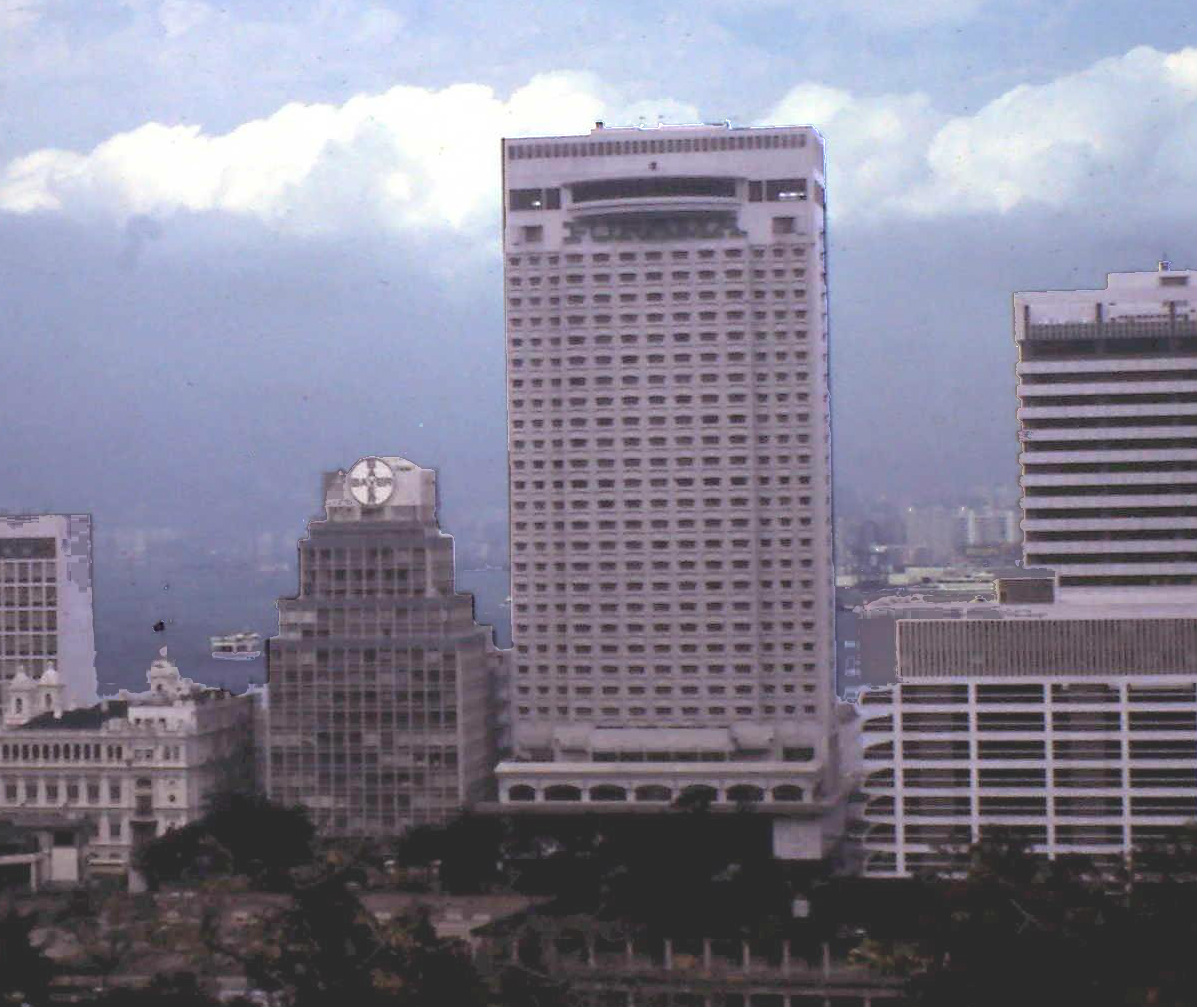
- The Furama Hotel in the late 1970s
- Interactive map of the Furama Hong Kong Hotel area

General information
- Location: 1 Connaught Road Central
- Opening: 1973
- Closed: November 2001; 24 years ago
- Owner: Lai Sun Development

Technical details
- Floor count: 33

Other information
- Number of rooms: 515

Furama Hong Kong Hotel
- Traditional Chinese: 富麗華酒店
- Simplified Chinese: 富丽华酒店
Transcriptions
Standard Mandarin
- Hanyu Pinyin: Fùlìhuá Jiǔdiàn
Yue: Cantonese
- Jyutping: fu3 lai6 waa4 zau2 dim3

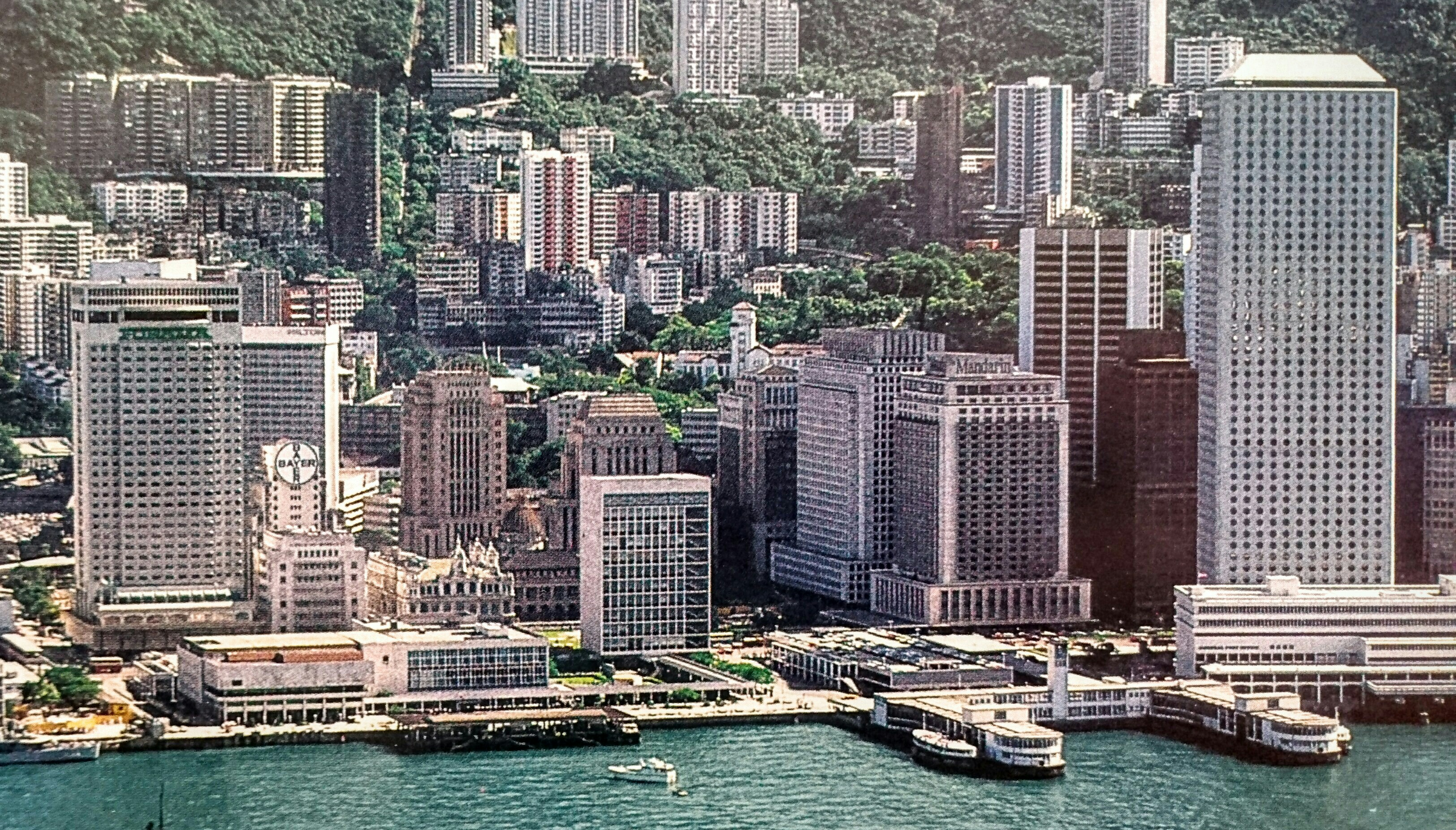
Hong Kong skyline, featuring the Furama Hotel (on the left). Before 1981.

The Furama Hotel (Chinese: 富麗華酒店) was a 33-storey hotel in Central, Hong Kong, located at 1 Connaught Road Central. The site is now occupied by the AIA Central office building.

== History ==
The Furama Hotel was designed by Eric Cumine Associates and built for the Furama group and was completed on 18 August 1973. It had 33 storeys and a total height of 361 feet (110 m), with a revolving restaurant on the top floor named "La Ronda".

Inter-Continental Hotels Ltd. assumed management in 1976, and the hotel was named Hotel Furama Inter-Continental. In 1990 the hotel was acquired by Kempinski and renamed the Hotel Furama Kempinski Hong Kong.

Lai Sun Development (LSD) acquired the hotel's parent company, Furama Hotel Enterprises, in June 1997 for HK$7 billion. This was done by acquiring a 45.42 per cent stake for $3.13 billion, and a general offer at $33.50 for each remaining shares at a total cost of $6.893 billion. To finance the acquisition, the company geared itself up heavily taking on $5 billion in bank loans and issuing bonds for more than $2 billion.

While the other Furama Group hotels were integrated into the hotels division, Lai Sun Hotels, the Furama plot was to be combined with the Ritz Carlton plot, which it already owned, for redevelopment into a prime office block. Then the Asian financial crisis struck, plunging the entire group into distress and forced asset sales.

In March 2000, LSD announced that a 65% stake in the Furama would be sold to a 50:50 joint venture between Pidemco, controlled by Temasek Holdings, and AIG for HK$1.88 billion. As part of the deal, Lai Sun would continue to operate the hotel until its redevelopment, at an annual rental of HK$145 million. Together with CapitaLand, and AIG, LSD formed Bayshore Development Group to develop AIG Tower, a 39-storey commercial office block with a gross floor area of 450,000 square feet (42,000 m^{2}). AIG and CapitaLand each own 35 per cent, and Lai Sun owns 30 per cent. The Furama closed in November, and was demolished in December 2001.
