= Crocodile Garments =

Textile and garments company

- Type: Retail
- Industry: Garments
- Founded: 1952; 74 years ago
- Headquarters: Hong Kong, China
- Products: Clothes
- Website: crocodileinternational.com

Crocodile Garments
- Traditional Chinese: 鱷魚恤
Transcriptions
Yue: Cantonese
- Yale Romanization: Ngohk yú sēut
- Jyutping: Ngok6 ju2 seot1

Crocodile Garments (SEHK: 122) is a textile and garment company based in Hong Kong. Crocodile Garments was founded by the late Dr. Chan Shun (1917–1997) in 1952. Ms. Vanessa Lam is the current chairman & CEO of the company.

== History ==
Li Wah Man Shirt Factory
- Traditional Chinese: 利華民恤衫廠
Transcriptions
Yue: Cantonese
- Yale Romanization: Leih wàh màhn sēut sāam chóng
- Jyutping: Lei6 waa4 man4 seot1 saam1 cong2

When he was young, Chan learned to sew and fix sewing machines, which he used to earn money while traveling between Chinese towns in his teenage years. Chan founded his company, then called the Li Wah Man Shirt Factory, in 1952. The brand Crocodile Garments was introduced after Chan wanted his products to be as "tough and luxurious as crocodile skin". The company was able to secure the trademark, initially registered in 1910 by Germans, before it was confiscated by British authorities after World War II.

Chan retired in 1970 and passed company control to his children. Crocodile Garments was first listed on the Hong Kong Stock Exchange in 1971, and in 1987, the business was sold to Lai Sun Garment, controlled by the late billionaire Lim Por Yen.

Crocodile Garments originally sold dress shirts before expanding to become the largest chain garment store in Hong Kong. They exported to Japan, Singapore and other Asian countries. A second line called Cal-Thomas was started in CA, USA. Crocodile emerged as the leading fashion label with the expansion of a woman's line and a children's line called CrocoKids. At its peak, Crocodile Garments was the largest garment chain before the conception of G2000, Giordano, U2 and Bossini in the 1990s. In 1980, Crocodile Garments partnered with the French clothing company Lacoste to become the sole distributor of Lacoste products in Hong Kong.

Between 2015 and 2020, the share of Crocodile Garments lost 72% of its value. In 2019, the heirs to the Crocodile Garments fortune were ordered by the Canadian fiscal authorities to hand out documents related to an offshore company used by the heirs to make massive donations in Canada.

== Legal dispute with Lacoste ==
Despite the Hong Kong distribution deal with Lacoste, Crocodile had a long-standing dispute over the logo and clothing lines with the French company. Crocodile uses a crocodile logo that faces left, while Lacoste uses one that faces right.

Lacoste had registered their trademark in mainland China in 1980, the same year both companies agreed to let Crocodile have exclusive rights to sell Lacoste goods in Hong Kong. When Crocodile attempted to apply for a trademark in mainland China, however, Lacoste filed lawsuits in 1998 in both Hong Kong and Beijing, asking for a 3.5-million-yuan compensation. Lacoste alleged that as part of their distribution agreement, Crocodile promised to not use any logo similar to Lacoste's outside of Hong Kong.

Lacoste won their Hong Kong lawsuit in 1999. The two fought an extended fight for logo rights in China, but eventually reached a compromise in 2003. Crocodile agreed to change its logo to have a more vertical tail and more scales for its logo. In 2013, Crocodile Garments won the right to appeal this trademark agreement in New Zealand. In 2017, the NZ Supreme Court reinforced the "use it or lose it" trademark rule to argue in favor of Crocodile Garments' request to annul Lacoste's exclusive use of the crocodile since the French company does not commercialize its products in New Zealand.

In the Philippines, the supreme court had a decision dated 6 November 2023, released on 10 September 2024 against Lacoste. The high court upheld rulings from lower tribunals, dismissing Lacoste's lawsuit against Crocodile over the brand logo dispute. "The Court holds that there are pronounced differences between Lacoste’s and Crocodile’s marks, [which make] them distinguishable from one another,” the high court's 16-page ruling stated.
