= AIA Central =

Skyscraper in Hong Kong

- 友邦金融中心
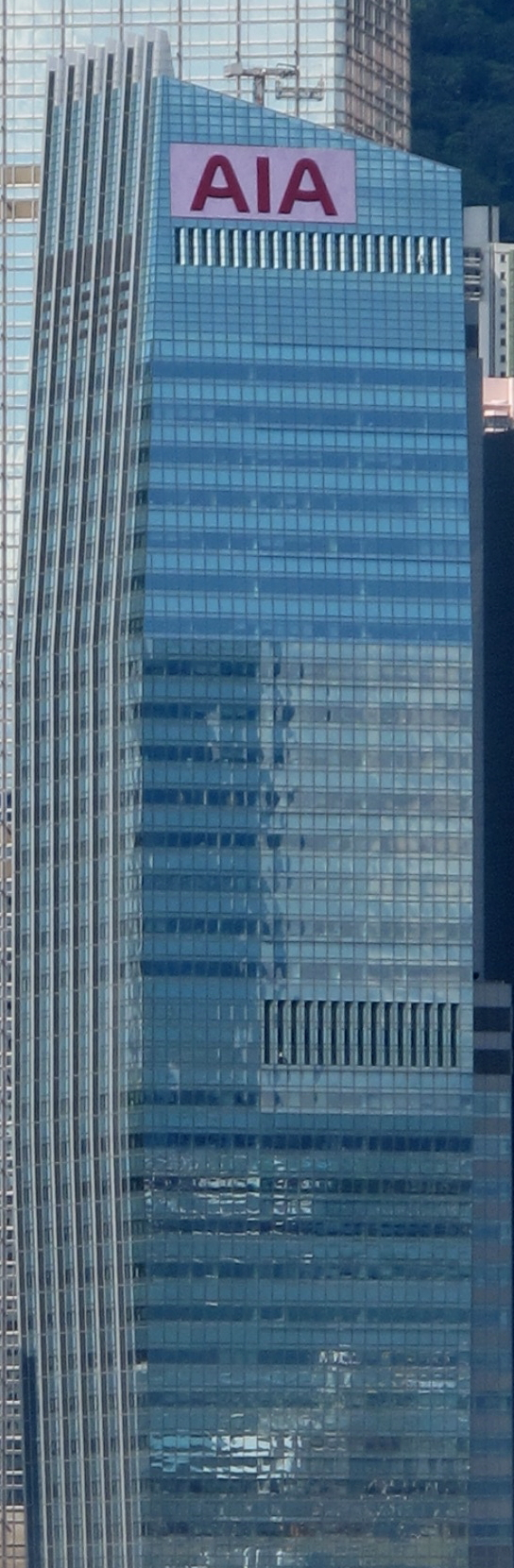
- Full view of AIA Central, from Tsim Sha Tsui in May 2013
- Interactive map of the AIA Central area

General information
- Status: Completed
- Type: Office
- Location: 1 Connaught Road Central, Central, Hong Kong
- Coordinates: 22°16′52.5″N 114°09′42.5″E
- Construction started: 2002; 24 years ago
- Opening: 2006; 20 years ago
- Owner: Lai Sun Development, CapitaLand, American International Group

Height
- Roof: 185 m (607 ft)

Technical details
- Floor count: 40
- Floor area: 450,000 square feet (41,806 m^{2})

Design and construction
- Architect: Skidmore, Owings & Merrill
- Structural engineer: Leslie E. Robertson Associates

The AIA Central (Chinese: 友邦金融中心), formerly called AIG Tower (美國國際集團大廈), in Hong Kong is a 185-metre (607 ft.), 37-storey skyscraper that was completed in 2005 and serves as the headquarters of AIA Group. It is located in Central, not far from the landmark Bank of China Tower.

The Furama Kempinski Hotel, famous for its revolving restaurant, formerly stood on the same lot that the former AIG Tower rises from, but in December 2001, the 33-storey hotel was demolished to make way for the AIG Tower. The tower was renamed to AIA Central on 9 July 2009.

The building was jointly developed by Lai Sun Development, CapitaLand, and American International Group (AIG). The architectural firm Skidmore, Owings & Merrill designed the building to look like the Chinese junk, a Chinese sailboat design dating from ancient times and still in use today. Leslie E. Robertson Associates are the structural engineers for this project. As well they included a pedestrian bridge linking the tower to the Hong Kong elevated walkway network.

The building has approximately 41,777 m² (450,000 ft²) of office accommodation.

== Plot history ==
The 999-year leasehold site has an area of 24,427 square feet (2,269 m^{2}).

Lai Sun Development ("LSD"), founded by textiles magnate Lim Por-yen, paid HK$7 billion for Furama Hotel Enterprises in June 1997. Lai Sun, which already owned the Ritz-Carlton Hotel next door, acquired a 45.42 per cent stake for $3.13 billion, and made a general offer at $33.50 for each remaining shares at a total cost of $6.893 billion.

LSD intended to combine the two plots into a prime office block. Then the Asian financial crisis struck, plunging the entire group into distress and forced asset sales. In March 2000, LSD announced that a 65% stake in the Furama Hotel would be sold to a 50:50 joint venture between Pidemco and AIG for HK$1.88 billion. Pidemco, the largest owner of commercial properties in Singapore, is part of Singapore Technologies, controlled by Temasek Holdings. As part of the deal, Lai Sun would continue to operate the hotel until its redevelopment. The Furama Hotel closed in November, and was demolished in December 2001. Following the demolition of the Furama Hotel, the construction of the new tower AIA Central commenced in November 2002. AIA Central is a 37-storey grade A office building with a gross floor area of approximately 41,777 square metres. It provides 26 floors of prime office space, each of some 13,000 – 15,000 square foot lettable area with a total gross area of 450,000 square foot. The building was developed by Bayshore Development Group Limited, a joint venture of AIA and Lai Sun Development Company Limited.

== Gallery ==
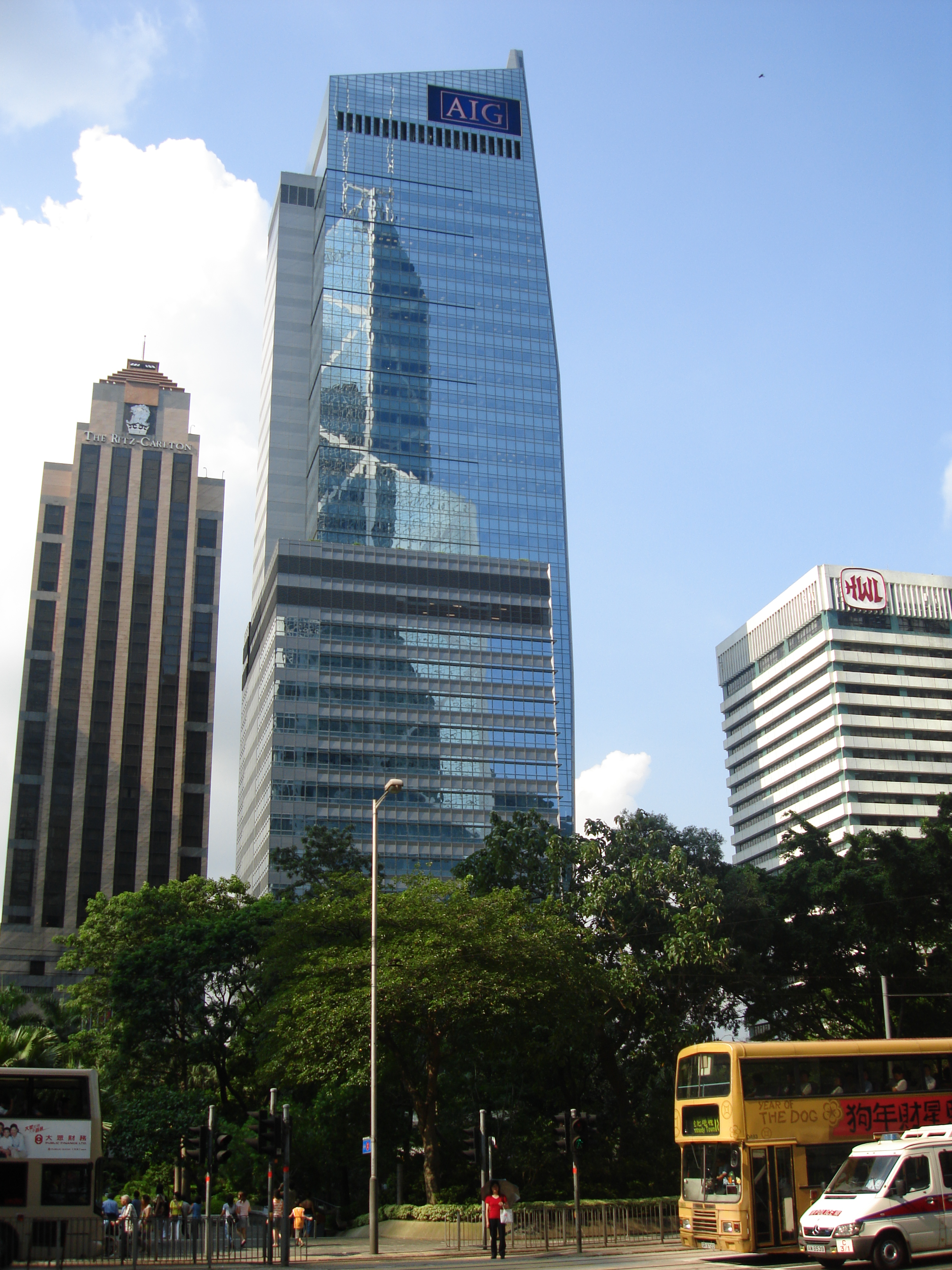
Westerly view of AIA Central in August 2006, Ritz Carlton on the left

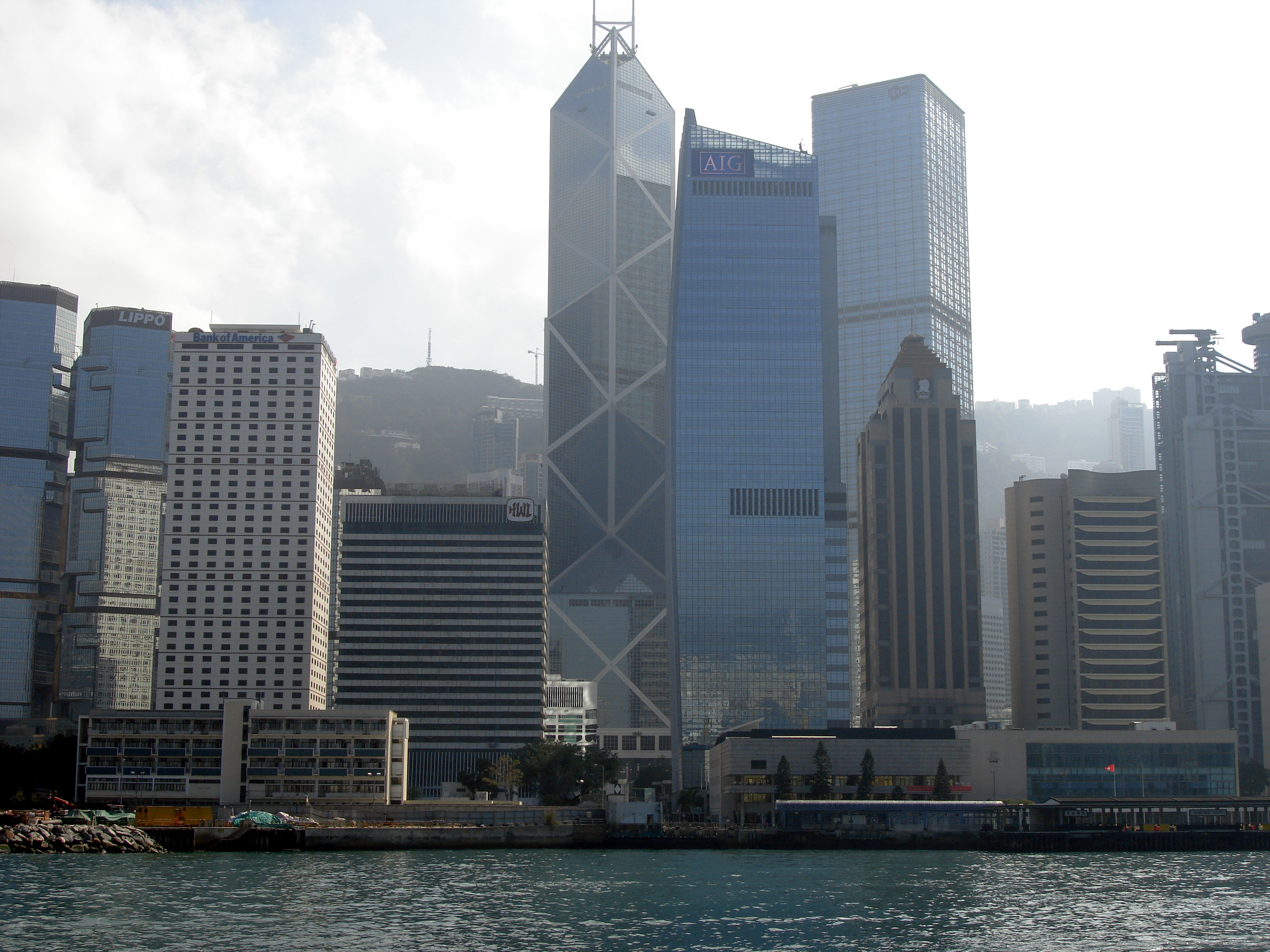
AIA Central amongst the Hong Kong skyline in February 2006

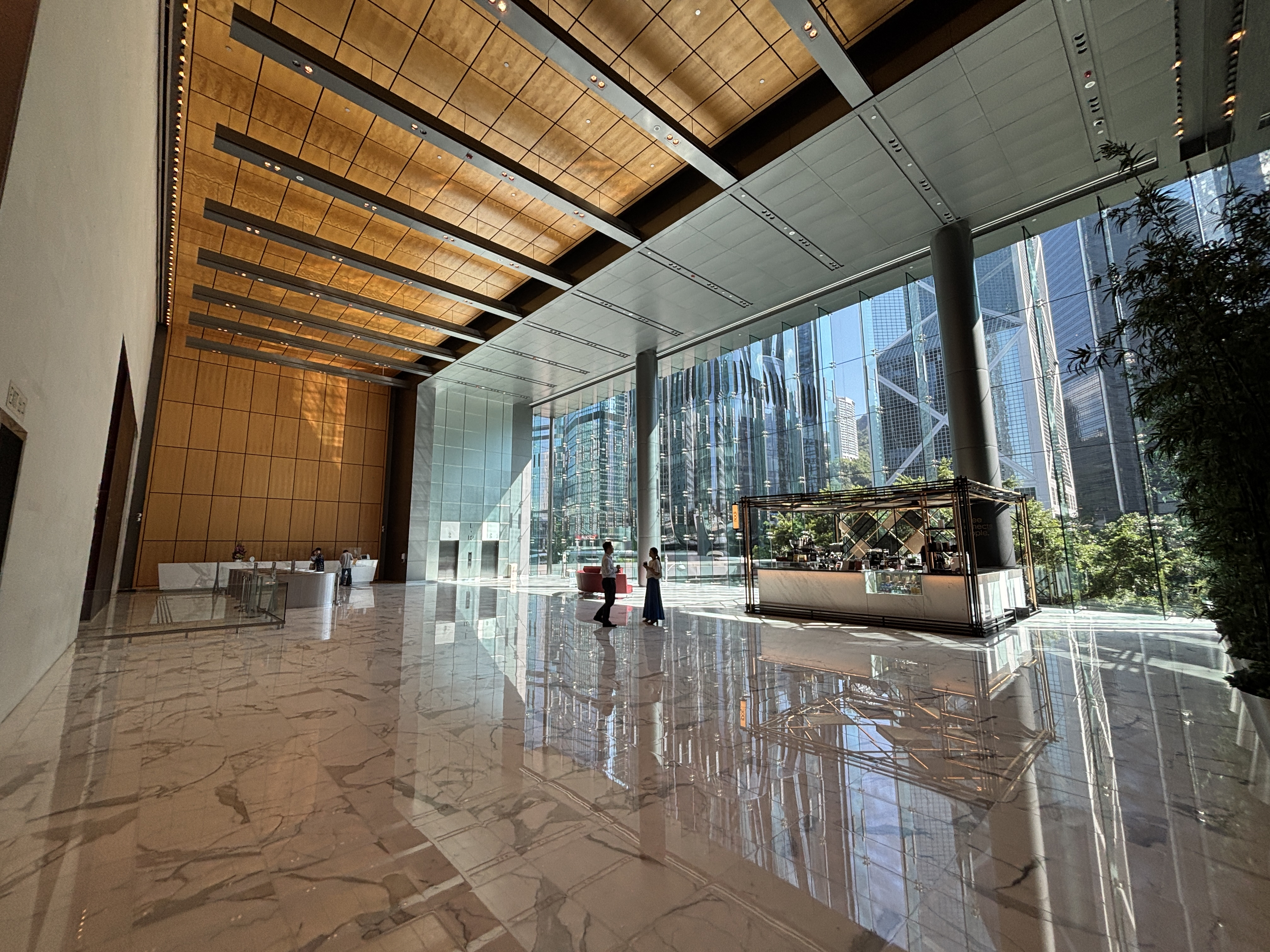
Lobby of AIA Central

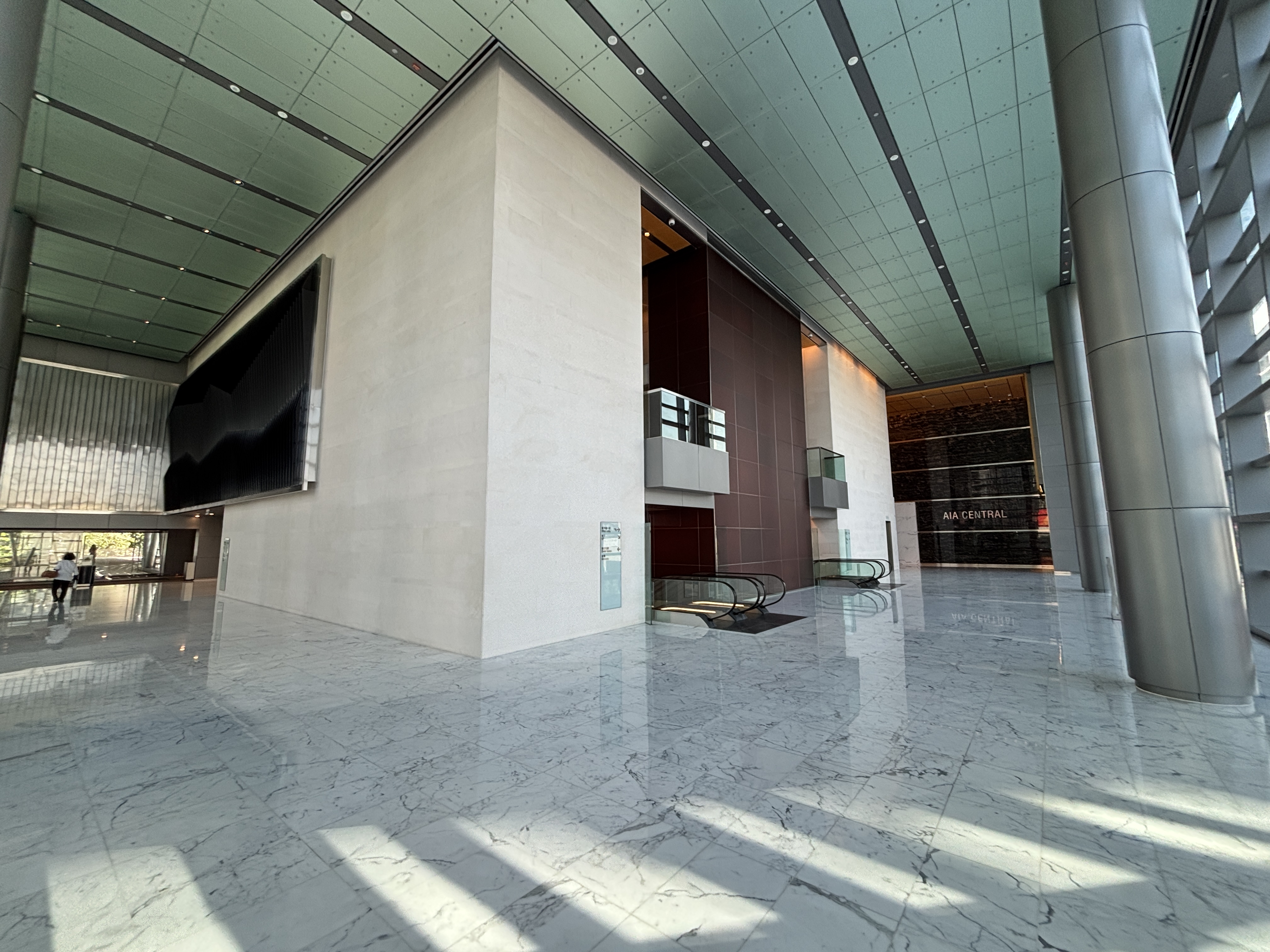
Transfer level Lobby of AIA Central

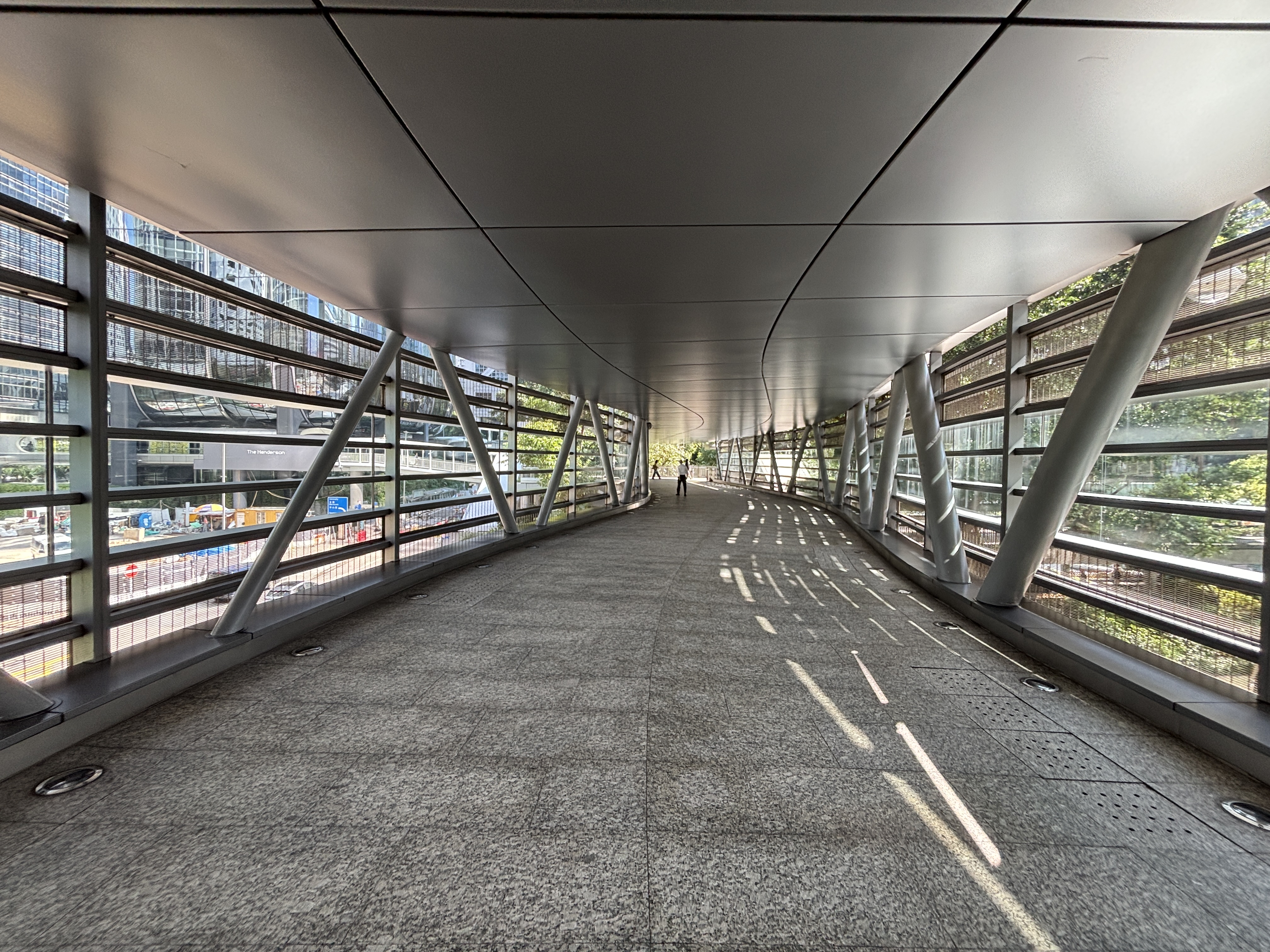
Bridge

== See also ==
- List of tallest buildings in Hong Kong
