= Connaught Road =

Road in Hong Kong

Coordinates: 22°16′51.60″N 114°9′46.80″E

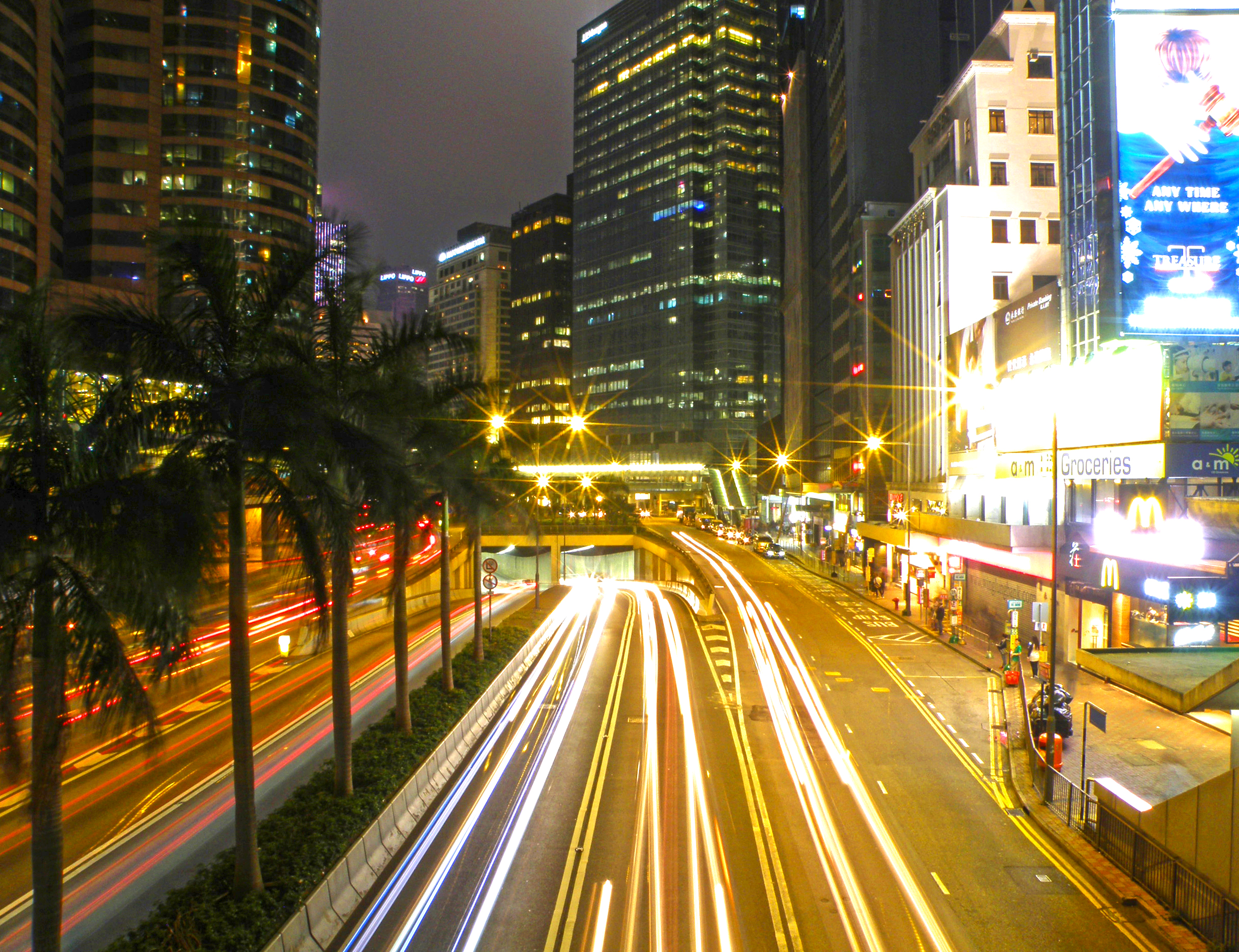
- Connaught Road Central at night in March 2015, with Exchange Square on the left
- Interactive map of Connaught Road
- Native name: 干諾道 (Yue Chinese)
- Namesake: Prince Arthur, Duke of Connaught and Strathearn
- Length: 5.3 kilometres (3.3 mi)
- Location: Wan Chai, Hong Kong
- East end: Harcourt Road / Murray Road / Edinburgh Place
- West end: Shing Sai Road

Connaught Road
- Traditional Chinese: 干諾道
- Simplified Chinese: 干诺道
- Cantonese Yale: Gon nohk douh
- Jyutping: Gon^{1} nok^{6} dou^{6}
Transcriptions
Standard Mandarin
- Hanyu Pinyin: Gānnuò Dào
Yue: Cantonese
- Yale Romanization: Gon nohk douh
- Jyutping: Gon^{1} nok^{6} dou^{6}

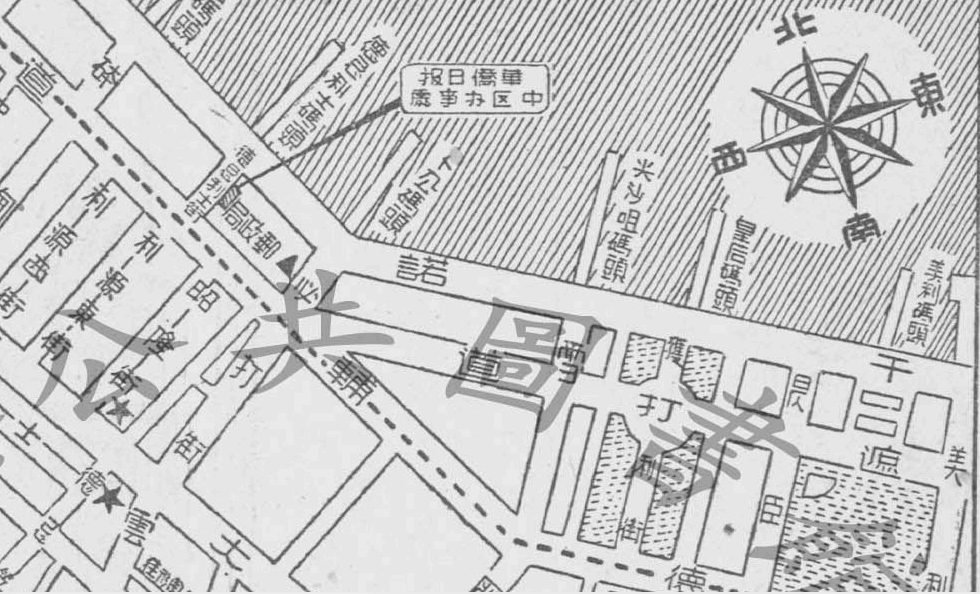
1911 map showing Connaught Road on the Central Waterfront

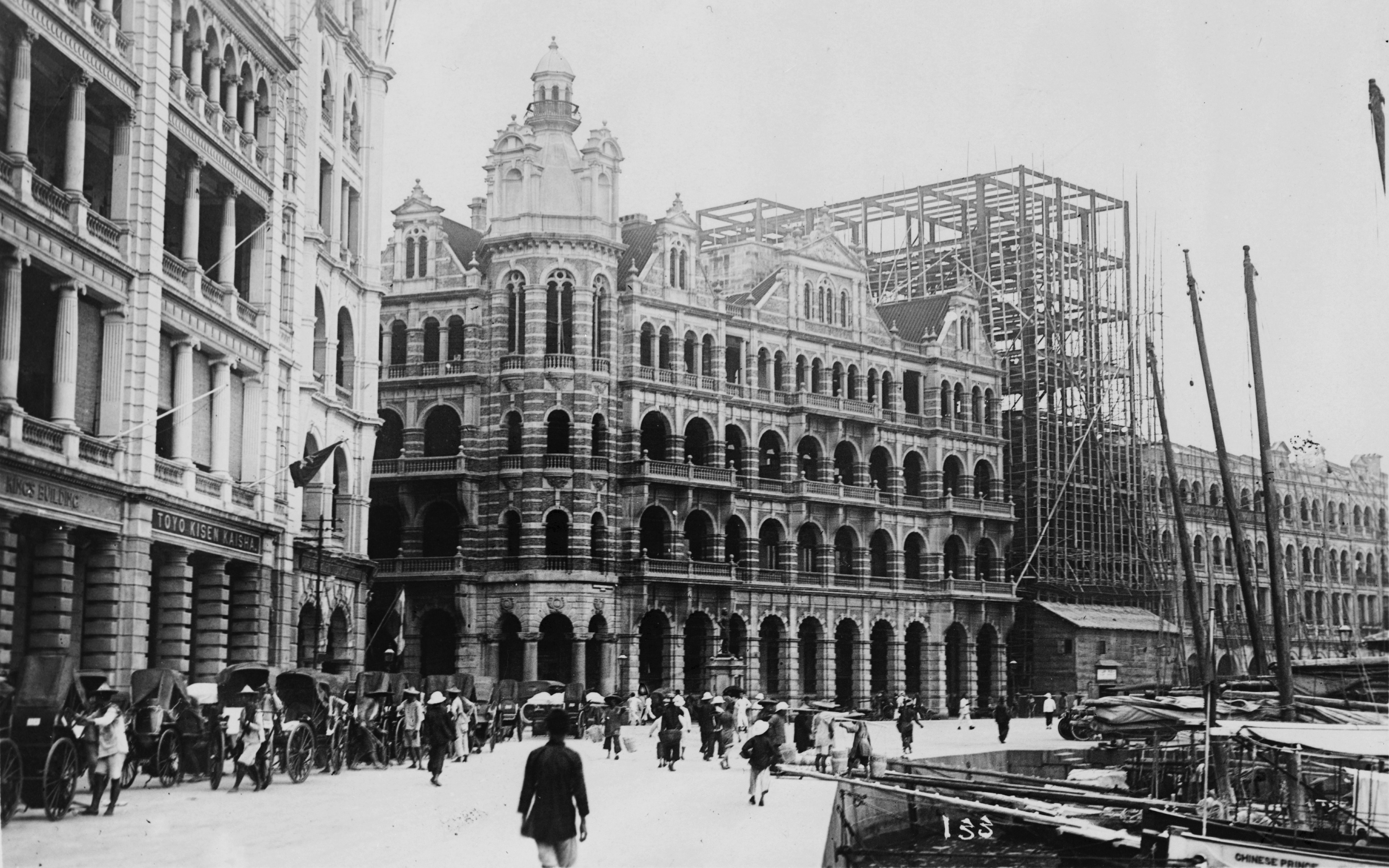
Connaght Road Central c.1923

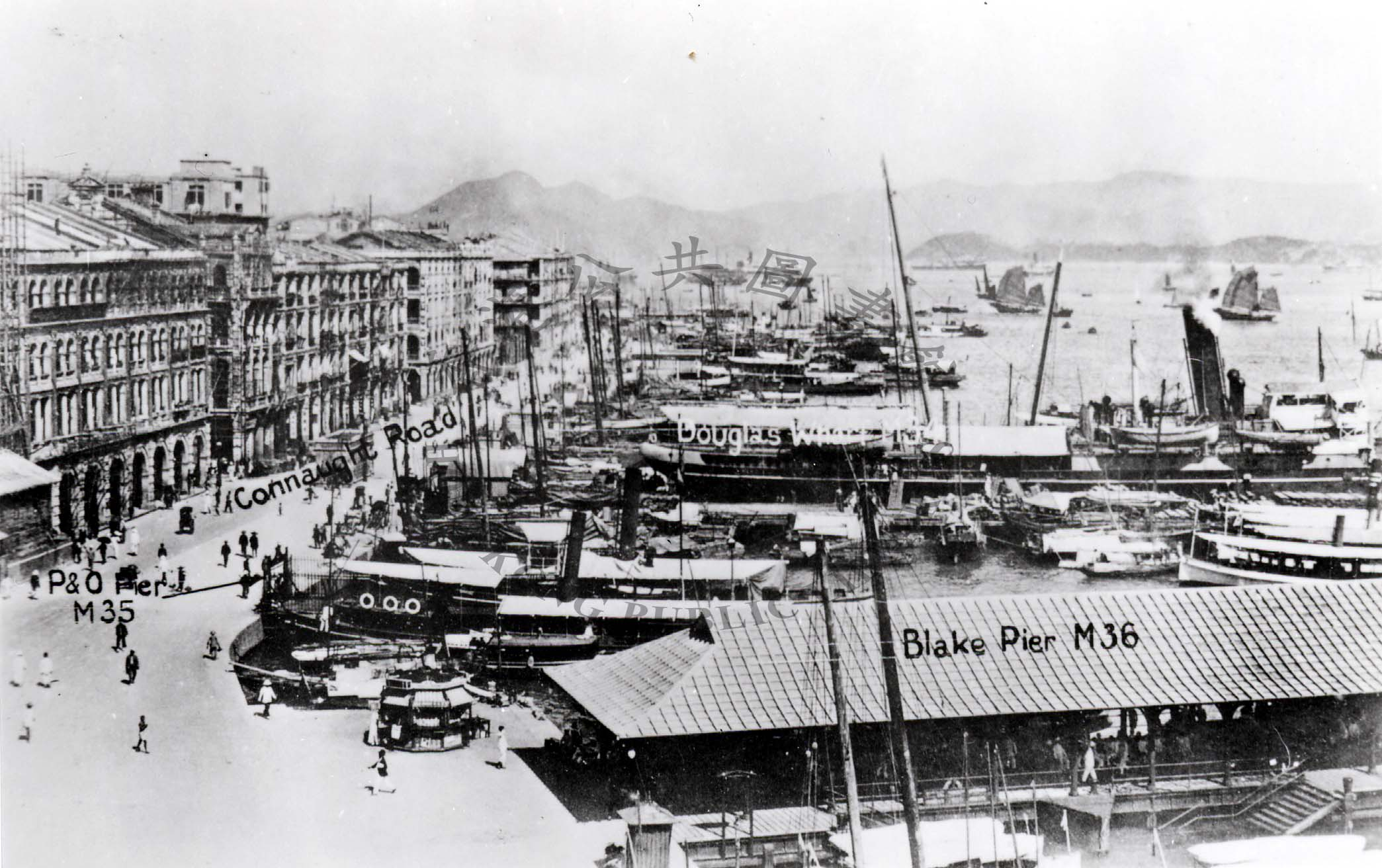
Connaught Road in the 1930s

Connaught Road (Chinese: 干諾道; Jyutping: gon1 nok6 dou6) is a major thoroughfare on the north shore of Hong Kong Island, Hong Kong. It links Shing Sai Road in Kennedy Town to the west and Harcourt Road in Admiralty to the east.

== Location ==
The road consists of two adjoining sections, namely Connaught Road Central (干諾道中) and Connaught Road West (干諾道西).

Connaught Road Central runs the length of Central, parallel to the north shore. It runs from approximately Admiralty in the east, where it connects Harcourt Road at the junction with Murray Road. The road ends west at On Tai Street, where it becomes Connaught Road West.

Connaught Road West runs towards the Kennedy Town and Pok Fu Lam areas in the west. For most of the stretch, Connaught Road West runs beneath the Connaught Road West Flyover, (Route 4). It is the main thoroughfare to the entrance of the Western Harbour Crossing and beyond to Shek Tong Tsui, where it merges with Des Voeux Road West.

== History ==
This road was once a waterfront promenade with boats docked against the northern side of the road. In 1889, the north shore of Victoria City was under extensive reclamation. In 1890, The Duke of Connaught and Strathearn visited the Colony of Hong Kong, when Francis Fleming, the then acting governor, announced a new road to be constructed in front of the old "Bowring Praya" (present-day Des Voeux Road). This newly constructed road was then named Connaught Road, after the royal duke. A statue of the Duke of Connaught and Strathearn once also occupied the junction of Pedder Street.

Connaught Road West was lined with many piers in the past. Due to the reclamation of the harbour, the entire length of Connaught Road has now become landlocked.

During the Japanese occupation of Hong Kong, Connaught Road was renamed Sumiyoshi Dori (住吉通).

== Structures along Connaught Road ==
=== Connaught Road Central ===
- AIG Tower
- Hong Kong Club Building
- Statue Square
- Hong Kong City Hall
- Mandarin Oriental, Hong Kong
- Connaught Place
- Chater House
- Jardine House
- Central Elevated Walkway
- World-Wide House
- Exchange Square
- International Finance Centre Tower One
- Wing On House
- Hang Seng Bank Headquarters Building
- Shun Tak Centre

=== Connaught Road West ===
- Sun Yat Sen Memorial Park
- Witty Street Depot of the Hong Kong Tramways
- Western Wholesale Food Market
- Western Harbour Crossing
- Liaison Office of the Central People's Government
- Hotel Marriott Courtyard Hong Kong
- Island Pacific Hotel

== Gallery ==
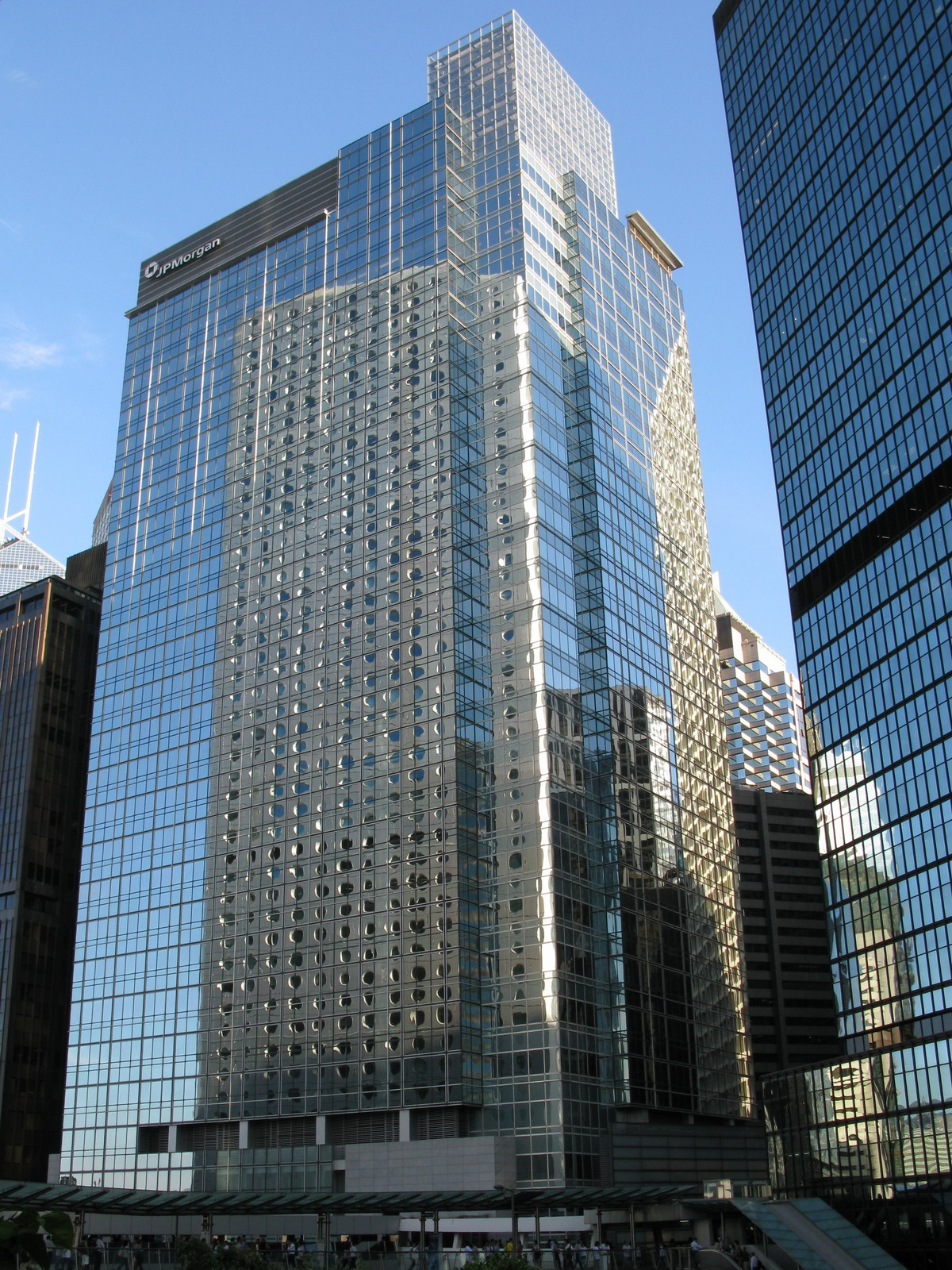
Connaught Road frontage of Chater House in July 2008

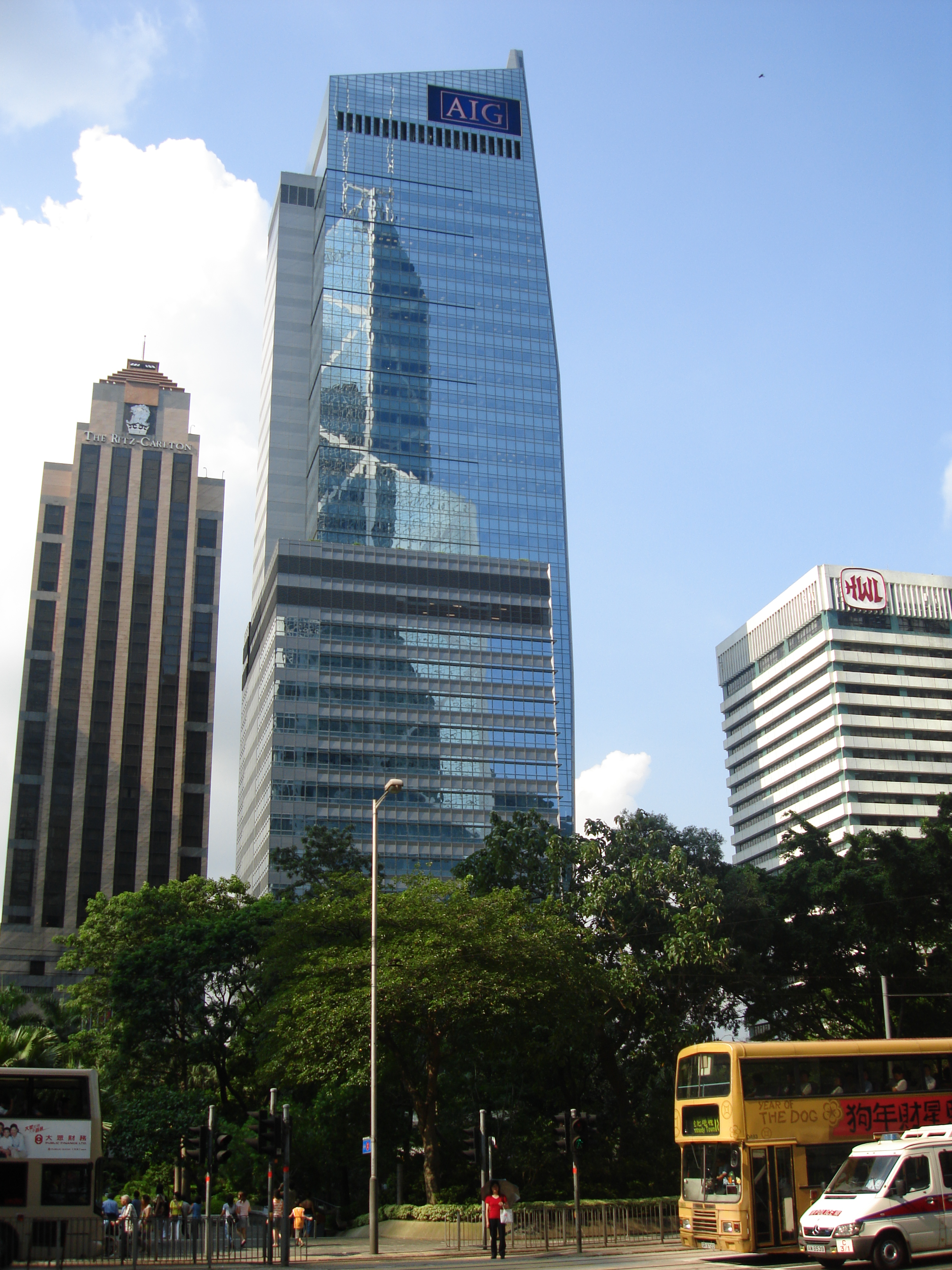
AIG Tower, 1 Connaught Road Central in August 2006

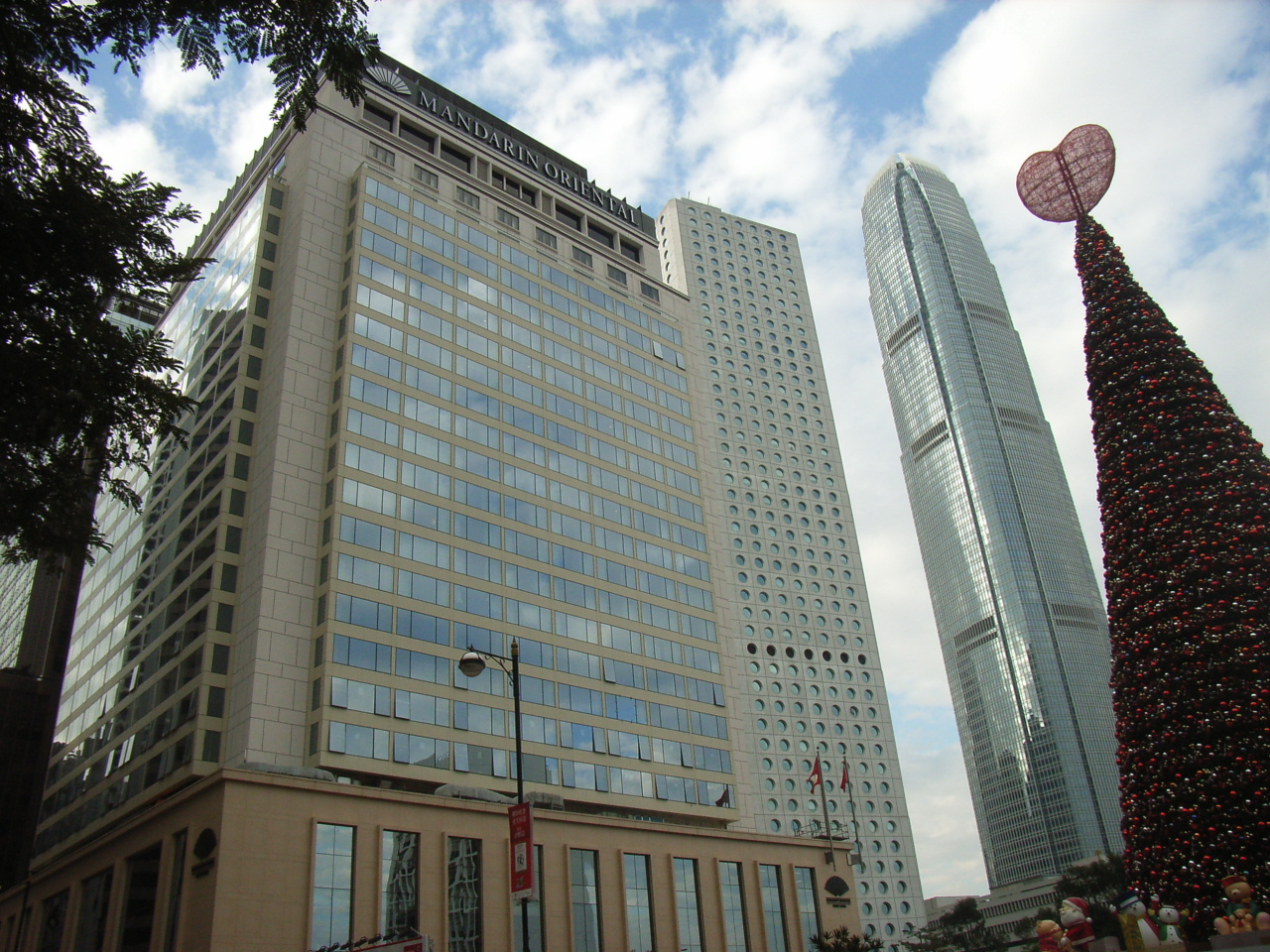
The Mandarin Oriental Hotel in December 2006

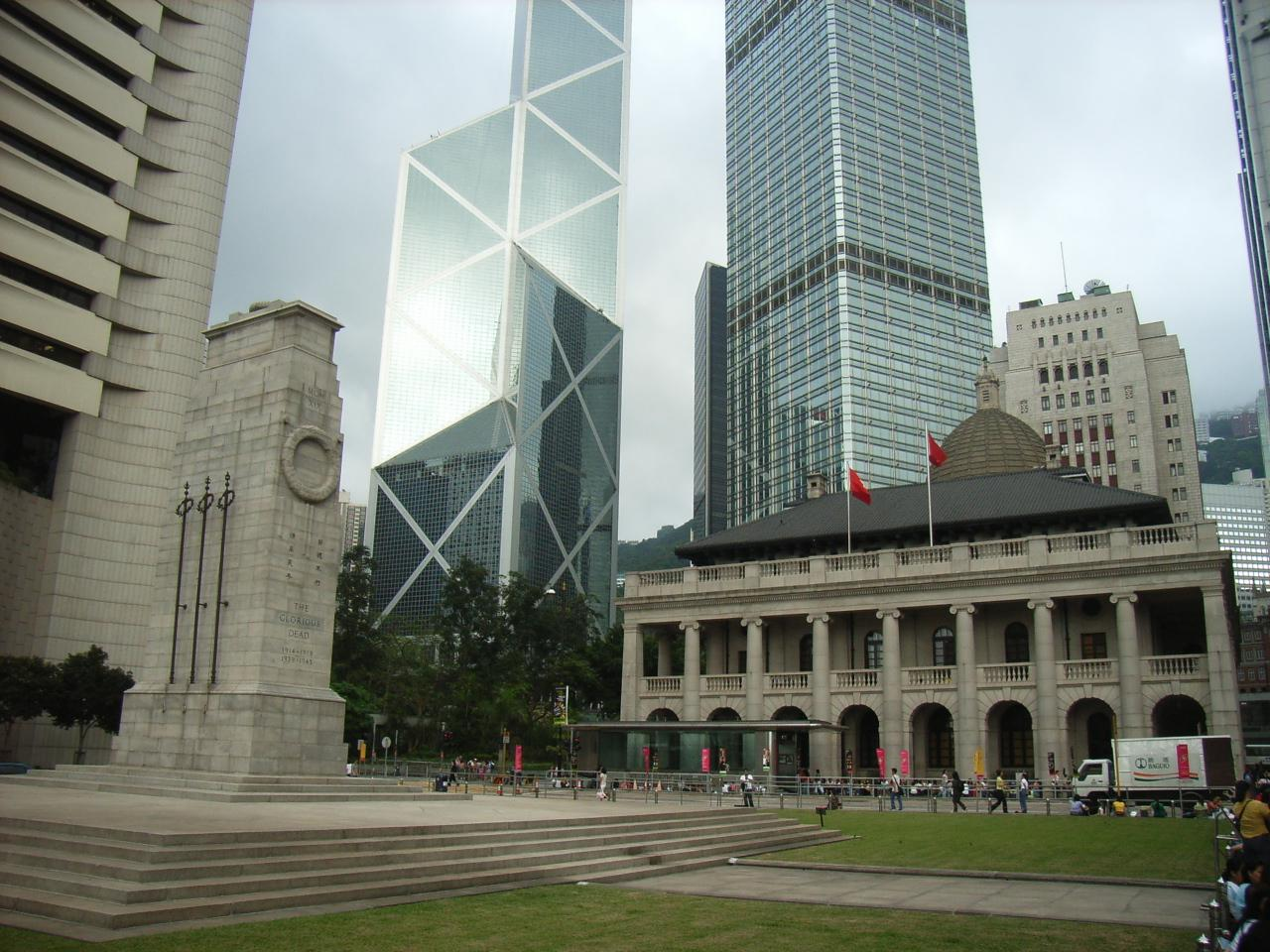
Statue Square abuts Connaught Road in May 2006

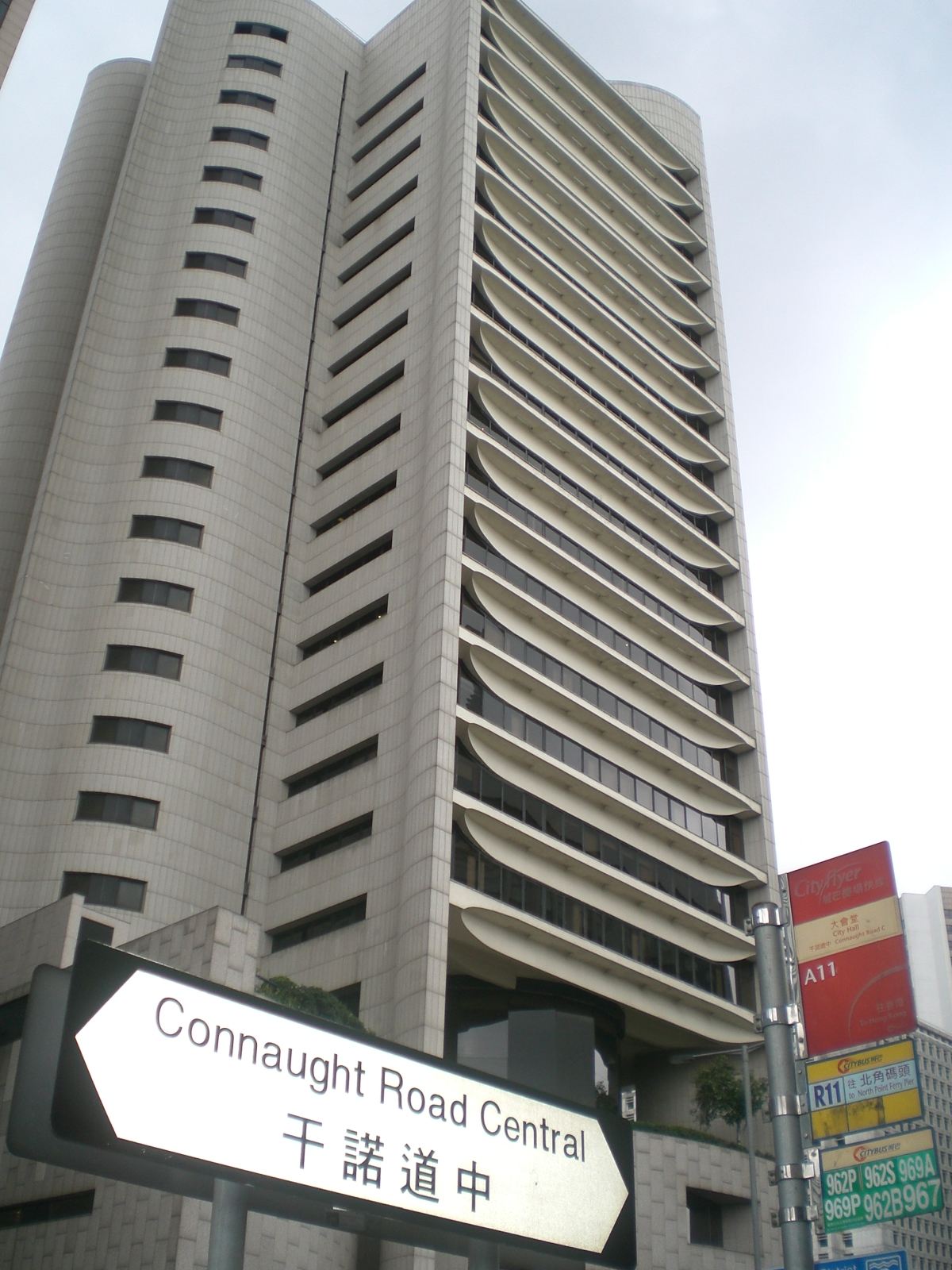
The Hong Kong Club Building's frontage on Connaught Road in April 2007

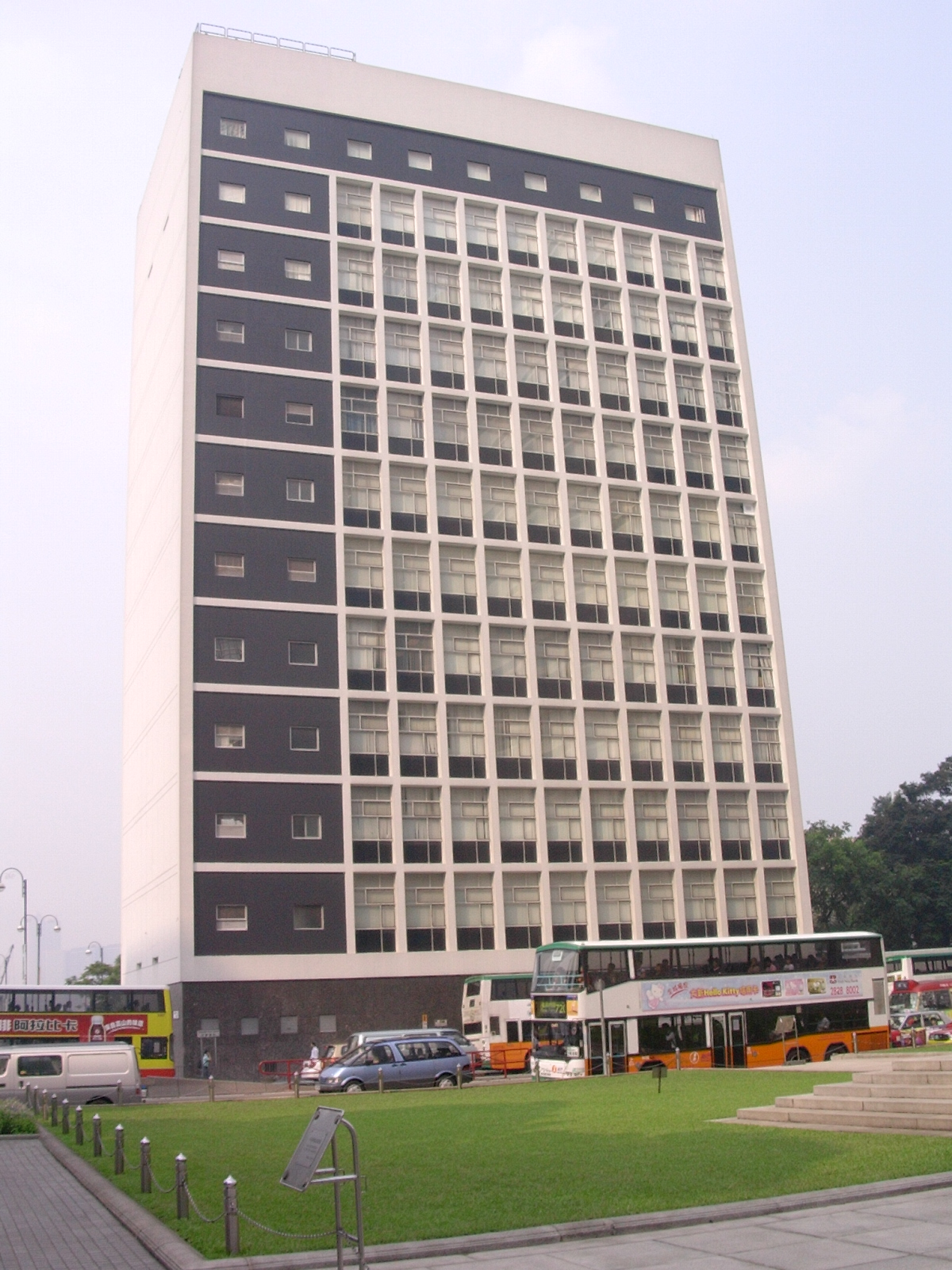
City Hall facing Connaught Road in September 2004

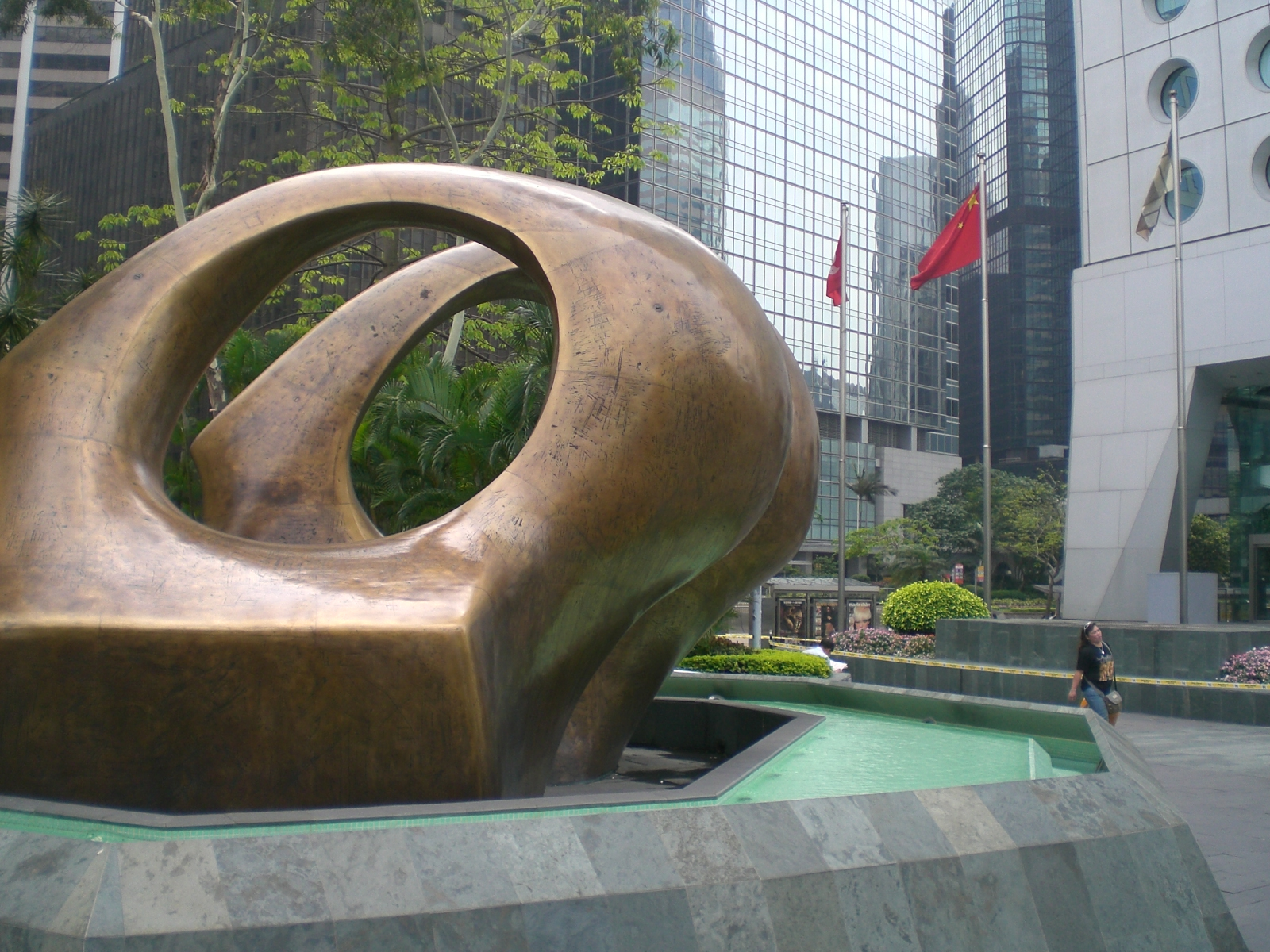
Henry Moore's sculpture, Connaught Place in 2007

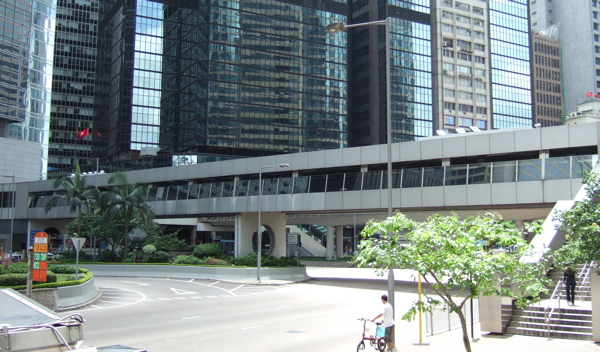
The Central Elevated Walkway crosses Connaught Road in June 2007

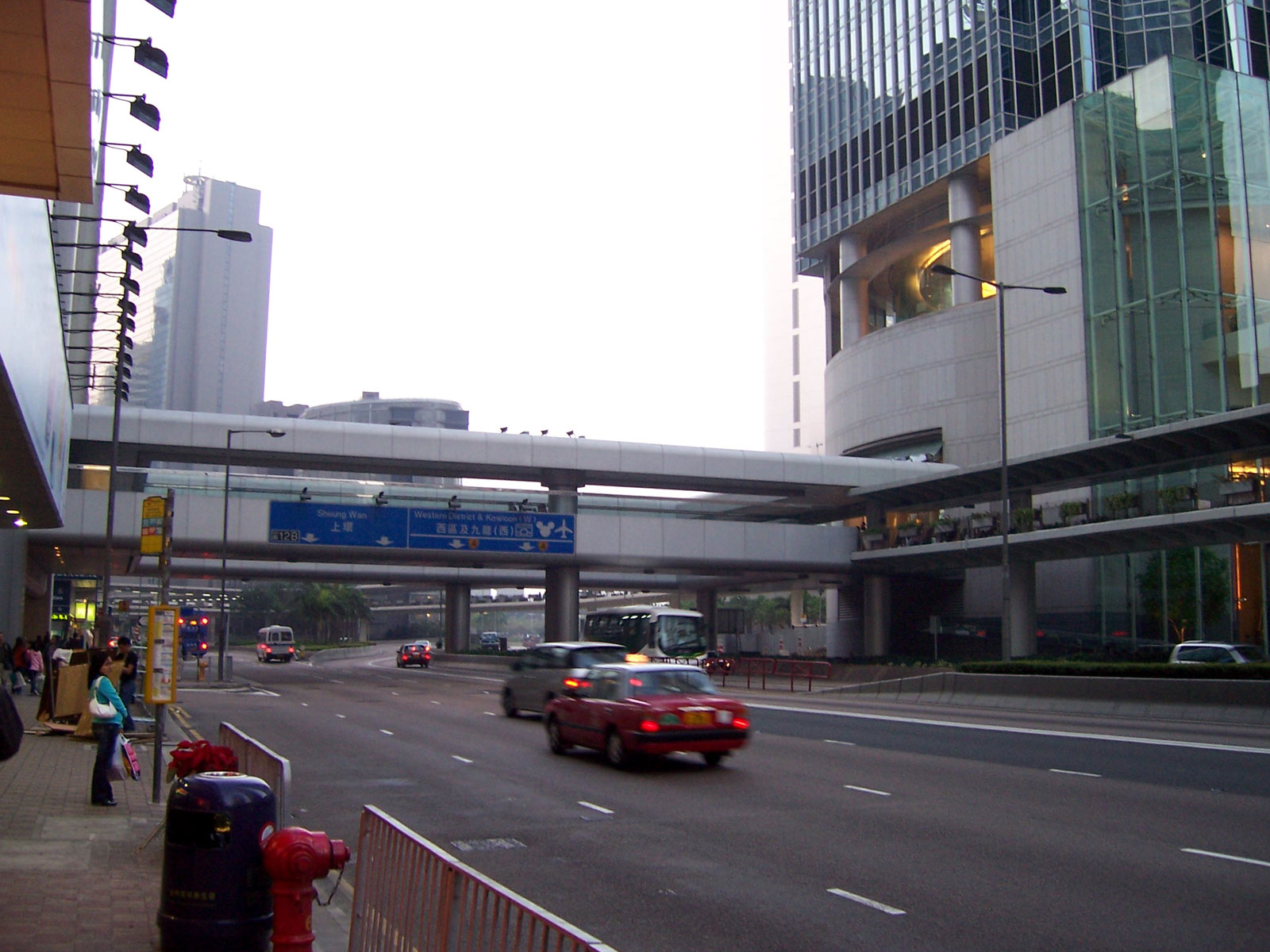
Connaught Road, looking west in January 2006 (1IFC on the right)

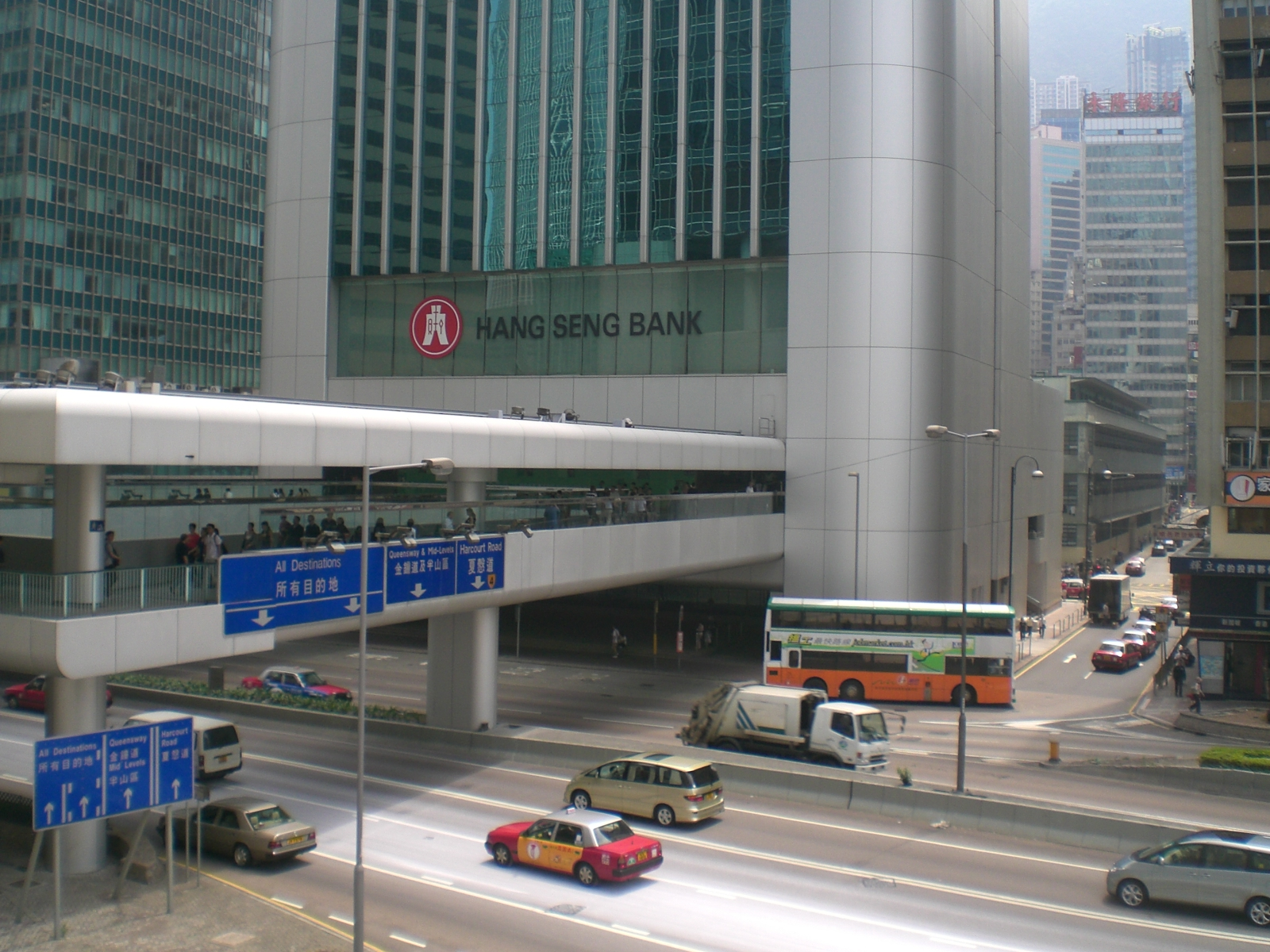
New Headquarters of the Hang Seng Bank in April 2007

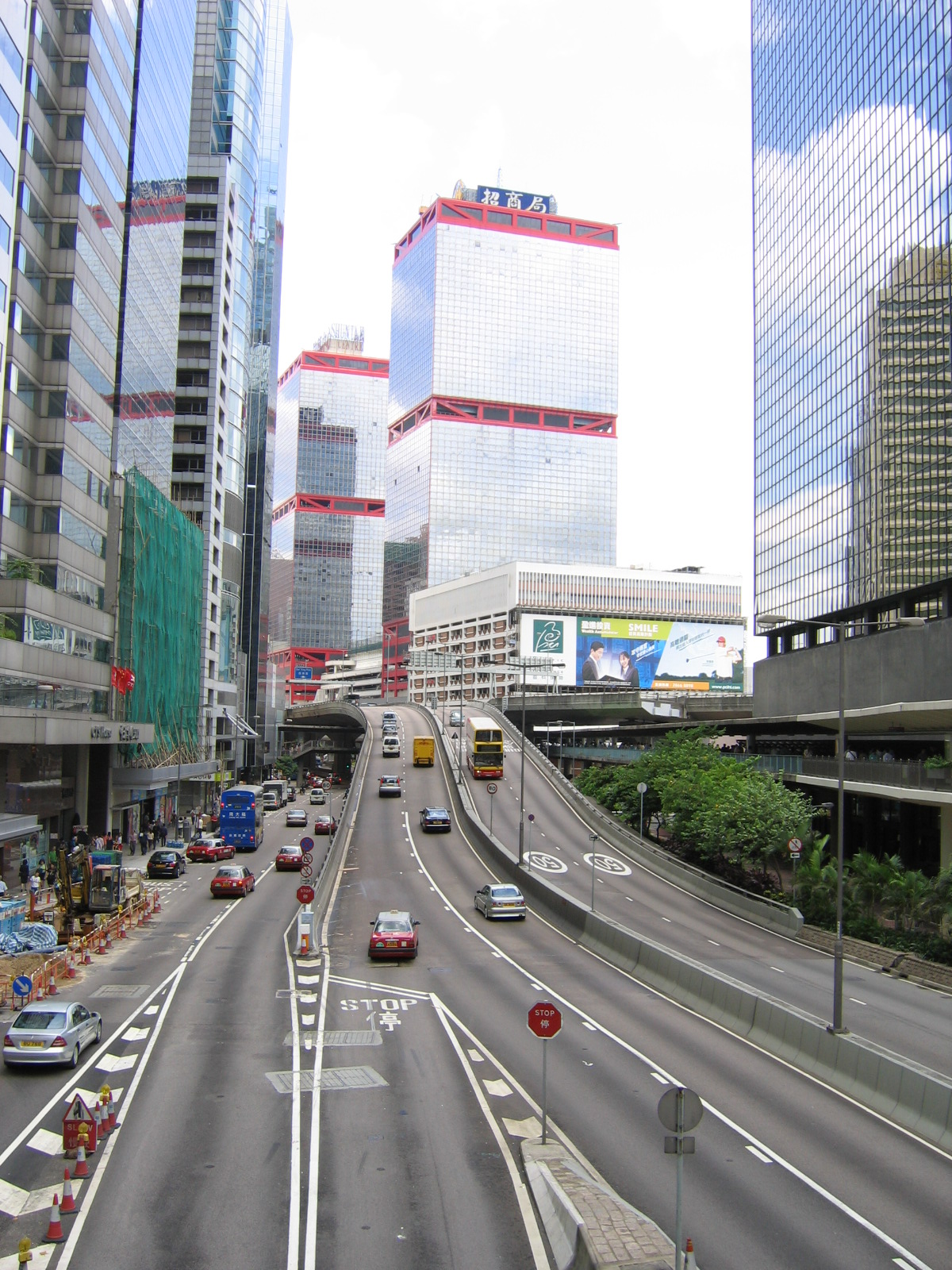
Connaught Road West Flyover leading up to the Shun Tak Centre (background) in August 2005

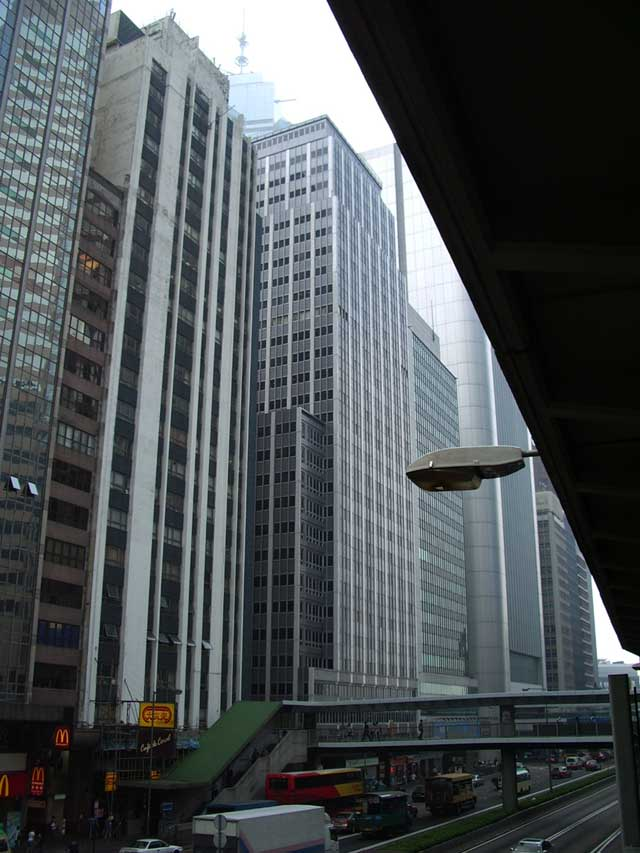
Wing On House (middle); the two buildings to the right are the old and new headquarters of Hang Seng Bank in September 2004

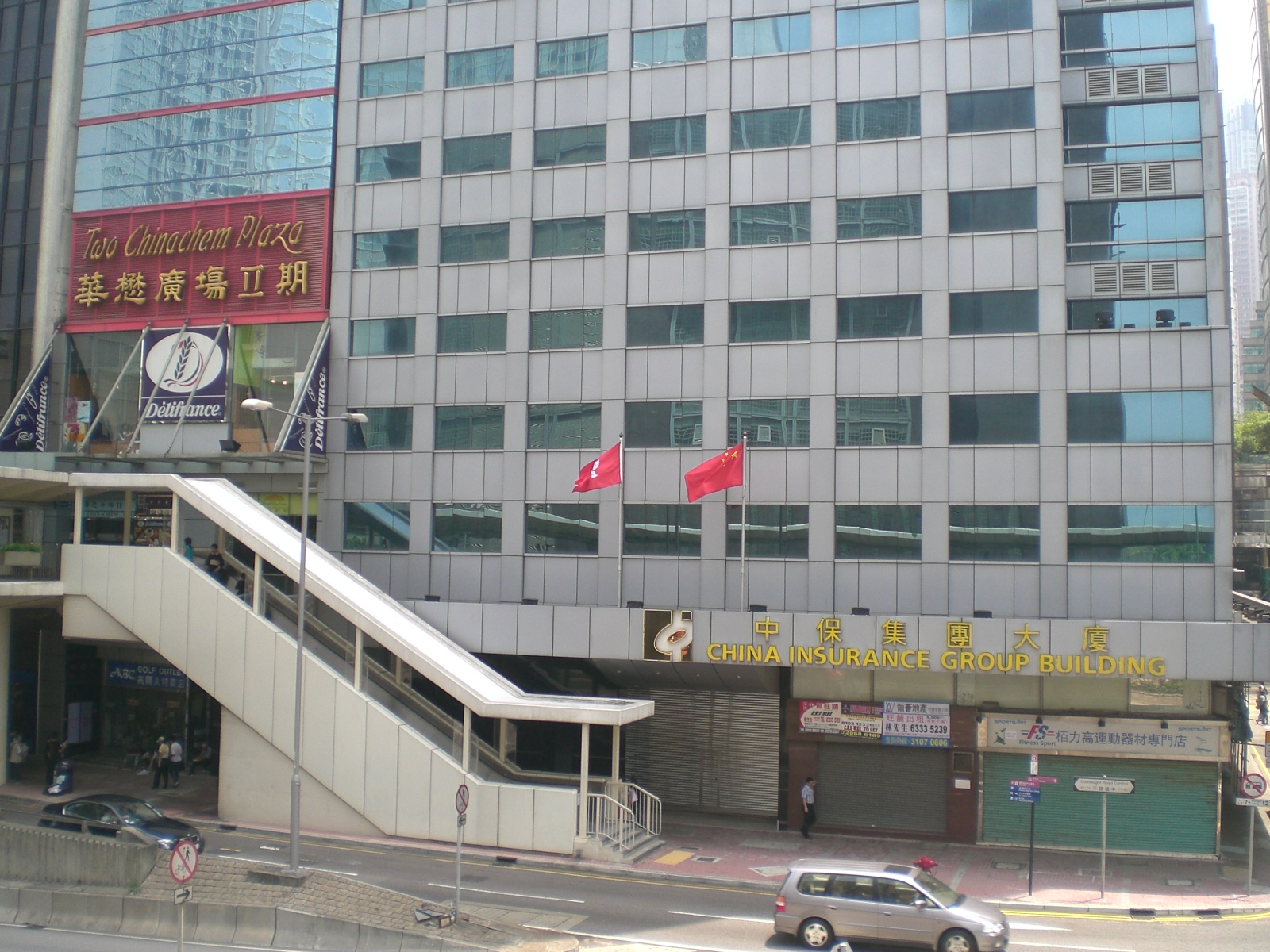
ChinaChem Plaza and the China Insurance Group Building are both on Connaught Road Central in April 2007

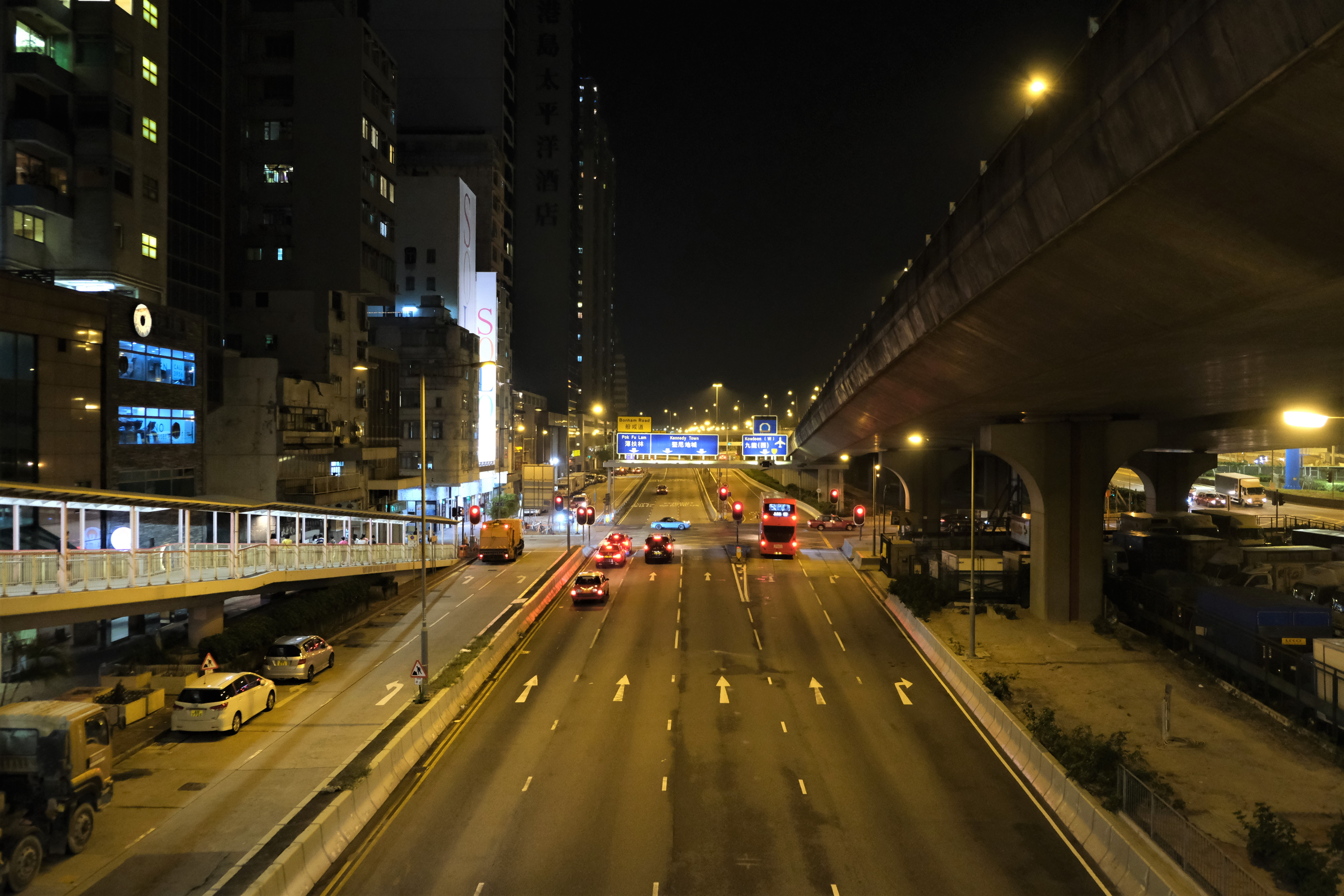
Connaught Road West at night in October 2019

== See also ==
- List of streets and roads in Hong Kong
- Pedder Street

Preceded by Central–Wan Chai Bypass	Hong Kong Route 4 Connaught Road West	Succeeded by Western Terminus
