= Lai Sun =

Hong Kong conglomerate

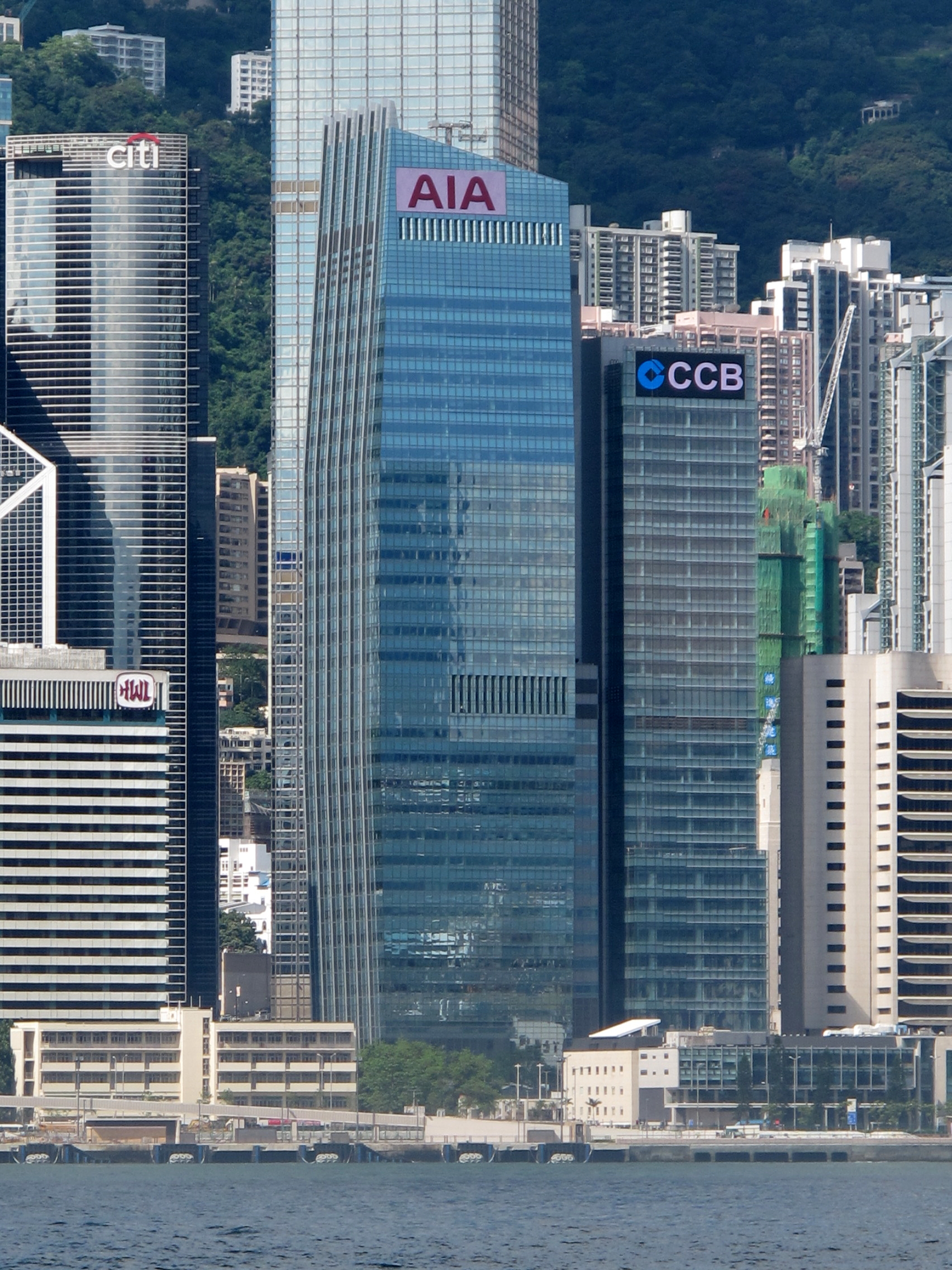
- Headquartered in 19/F, AIA Central, Hong Kong
- Native name: 麗新
- Founded: 1947; 79 years ago in Hong Kong
- Founder: Lim Por-yen
- Headquarters: Hong Kong,
- Website: www.laisun.com

Lai Sun Group (Chinese: 麗新集團; pinyin: Lìxīn Jítuán) is a Hong Kong conglomerate. It was founded by garment billionaire and entrepreneur, Lim Por-yen. Its businesses include property development, real estate investment, hotel, telecom, mass media and entertainment. Lai Sun is working with Major League Gaming to build an esports arena on Hengqin.

Lai Sun Group is developing Novotown at Hengqin, Zhuhai, China. It is an integrated tourism and entertainment project. Phase one has been completed, and features two indoor attractions Lionsgate Entertainment World and National Geographic Ultimate Explorer. It also includes the 494-room Hengqin Hyatt Regency Hotel and mixed-use shopping centre with a host of restaurants and bars. Phase one costs about 5 billion yuan (HK$6.16 billion). Phase 2 will include an interactive football experience centre and automobile experience centre in partnership with Real Madrid football club and Porsche respectively.

The group consists of several companies and some of them are listed on the Hong Kong Stock Exchange.

- Crocodile Garments
- Lai Sun Garment (International) Limited
- Lai Fung Holdings Limited
- Lai Sun Development Company Limited
- eSun Holdings Limited (0571.HK)

== Leadership ==
The Lai Sun Group has been run by Lim Por-yen and his family since its founding in 1947; the group is currently being run by the second generation of the family. Lim first became Chairman and an Executive Director in the company in 1959.

=== List of chairmen ===
1. Lim Por-yen (1959–1999); honorary chairman until 2005
2. Peter Lam (since 1999)

=== List of CEOs ===
1. Peter Lam (1977–2005)
2. Julius Lau (LSD: 2005-2025)
