= Lai Sun Development =

Lai Sun Development ("LSD") is a property developer in Hong Kong, public company listed on the Hong Kong Stock Exchange SEHK: 488 established in 1987 by the textiles magnate Lim Por-yen. His company, Lai Sun Garment, ("LSG") was founded in 1947, is also listed on the Hong Kong Stock Exchange. Lai Sun Garment is the controlling shareholder in LSD.

The company is headed by Peter Lam, son of the founder, who also runs the Media Asia Entertainment Group.

== History ==
=== 1997 financial crisis ===
Lai Sun Development, then already under the management of Peter Lam, paid HK$7 billion for Furama Hotel Enterprises in June 1997. Lai Sun acquired a 45.42 per cent stake for $3.13 billion, and made a general offer at $33.50 for each remaining shares at a total cost of $6.893 billion.

While the other Furama Group hotels became part of the hotels division, Lai Sun Hotels, LSD intended to combine the Furama plot with the Ritz Carlton plot, which it already owned, for redevelopment into a prime office block. Then the Asian financial crisis struck, plunging the entire group into distress and forced asset sales.

The company had geared itself up heavily in order to finance the acquisition at the top of the market. It had taken on $5 billion in bank loans and issued bonds worth more than $2 billion. Its value halved in the ensuing months, plunging the company into crisis. In 2000, the parent company commenced restructuring the group operations. In March 2000, LSD announced that a 65% stake in the Furama would be sold to a 50:50 joint venture between Pidemco, controlled by Temasek Holdings, and AIG for HK$1.88 billion. As part of the deal, Lai Sun would continue to operate the hotel until its redevelopment, at an annual rental of HK$145 million. The Furama closed in November, and was demolished in December 2001. Together with CapitaLand, and AIG, LSD formed Bayshore Development Group to develop AIG Tower, a 39-storey commercial office block with a gross floor area of 450,000 square foot (41,800 m²). AIG and CapitaLand each owned 35 per cent, and Lai Sun owns 30 per cent.

The asset sales to ungear the company continued - debt remained above HK$6 billion as at September 2002, when LSD sold its 32.75 per cent stake in Asia Television (ATV) to its chief executive, Chan Wing-kee, for HK$360 million

=== Ritz Carlton plot ===
The plot was held by Diamond String, a 76.57% group-owned entity. In November 2007, it was announced that China Construction Bank ("CCB") would take a 40% stake in the company for a consideration of HK$1.37 billion, while LSD stake would fall to 60%. The project to redevelop the 14,900 sq ft (1,380 m^{2}) site as an office tower, due to complete in 2011, will be partly occupied by the CCB. The hotel formally closed its doors on 1 January 2008, and has become probably the largest billboard in Hong Kong.

== See also ==
- AIG Tower
- Furama Kempinski Hotel
