= Lim Por-yen =

Hong Kong businessman (1914–2005)

- Born: 21 December 1914; Chaoyang, Guangdong, China
- Died: 18 February 2005 (aged 90); Queen Mary Hospital, Hong Kong
- Known for: Founding Lai Sun Group; Chairman of Asia Television
- Spouses: Lai Yuen-fong; U Po-chu; Gu Shui-ying; Choy Yim-yu (divorced)
- Children: 8, including Peter Lam and Pearl Lam

Lim Por-yen(21 December 1914 – 18 February 2005) was a Hong Kong industrialist. He founded the Lai Sun Group, and his family was the biggest shareholder of Asia Television.

== Biography ==
Lim was born in Chaoyang, Shantou, on 21 December 1914. He grew up in Shantou and Hong Kong. His father was a banker in Shantou. He moved to Hong Kong with his father in 1931.

In 1935, Lim returned to Shantou and worked as an apprentice at Jiacheng Bank (佳成銀行), a local bank in Shantou. In 1937, he returned to Hong Kong and worked as a cold call salesman. In 1945, after the Second World War, Lim and his wife started Sing Fook Knitting Factory in Un Chau Street, Sham Shui Po, concentrating on export business. Lim earned himself the nickname of "African King" in the 1950s when he exported cheap military uniforms to African countries. His company, Lai Sun Garment, was founded in 1947, and later listed on the Hong Kong Stock Exchange.

He successfully diversified into real estate in 1987 when he set up another vehicle, Lai Sun Development.

=== Public service and philanthropy ===
He is said to have made in excess of ¥700 million in donations to causes throughout China, of which Shantou's share was more than half. (Note: "據不完全統計，林百欣在北京、上海、廣州、汕頭和中山等地捐辦各種公益事業，總金額達人民幣7億元以上，僅在家鄉汕頭就有3.8億元。") He has been a supporter of education in Hong Kong by setting up several schools.

He also donated to the University of Hong Kong's SARS Fund and helped to establish the Jao Tsung-I Petite Ecole. His support of the HKU Foundation and to the university in general over the years earned him an honorary fellowship in 2003. Lim also endowed an Eye Genetics Research Center (named after him) at the CUHK in 2004.

Lim was a Hong Kong Affairs Adviser to Beijing. He also served on the Preparatory Committee and Selection Committee of the SAR. He was a founding member of the Better Hong Kong Foundation.

=== Corruption conviction ===
Lim was implicated in the largest bribery scandal in Taiwan at the time. Lim was arrested by Taiwan's Bureau of Investigation on accusations that he offered NT$200 million in bribes to several officials of the Taipei County Land Administration Bureau, including its former director.

Lim owned some land originally slated for farming and industrial use. After Lim bought it, officials allocated the land for the new National Taipei University, allowing him to sell the land back to Taipei County for more than NT$890 million (US$28.6 million), an estimated NT$300 million above market value. He is alleged to have bribed officials to rezone the land.

In 1999, he was found guilty on charges of bribery and money laundering through the land deals, but his prison sentence of 38 months was reduced by one year. His appeal of this conviction was still under consideration at the time of his death.

== Personal ==
At his death he remained legally married to his first wife, Lai Yuen-Fong.

His second wife, U Po-chu, is a 50-year veteran of the garment industry and is a non-executive director of Lai Sun Garment.

== Death ==
Lim died on 18 February 2005 at Queen Mary Hospital in Pok Fu Lam, from a lung infection; he was in his 90s.

== Footnotes ==
Business positions
Preceded by Cheng Yu-tung	Chairman of the Asia Television; 1990–1998	Succeeded by Wong Po-yan
