= Lambeth Walk, Hong Kong =

Hong Kong street

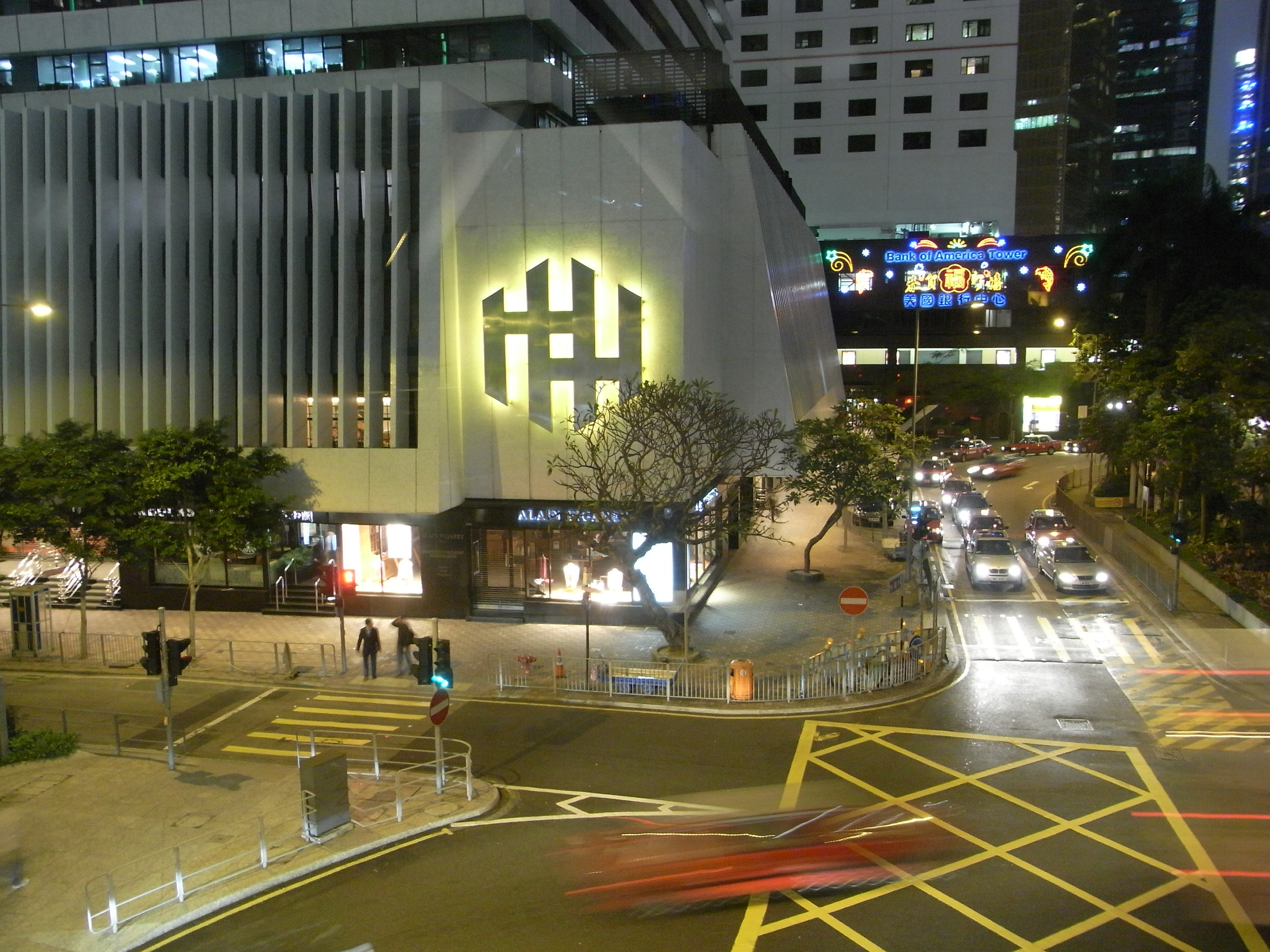
The junction of Lambeth Walk and Murray Road

Lambeth Walk (Chinese: 琳寶徑) is a street in Central, Central and Western District, Hong Kong Island. It starts from Cotton Tree Drive near Harcourt Road in the east, passes by the Bank of America Tower and Lambeth Walk Leisure Garden, and connects to the junction of Chater Road and Murray Road in the west.

Lambeth Walk in Central is named after Lambeth Walk in south London, made famous by the 1937 musical Me and My Girl.

== History ==
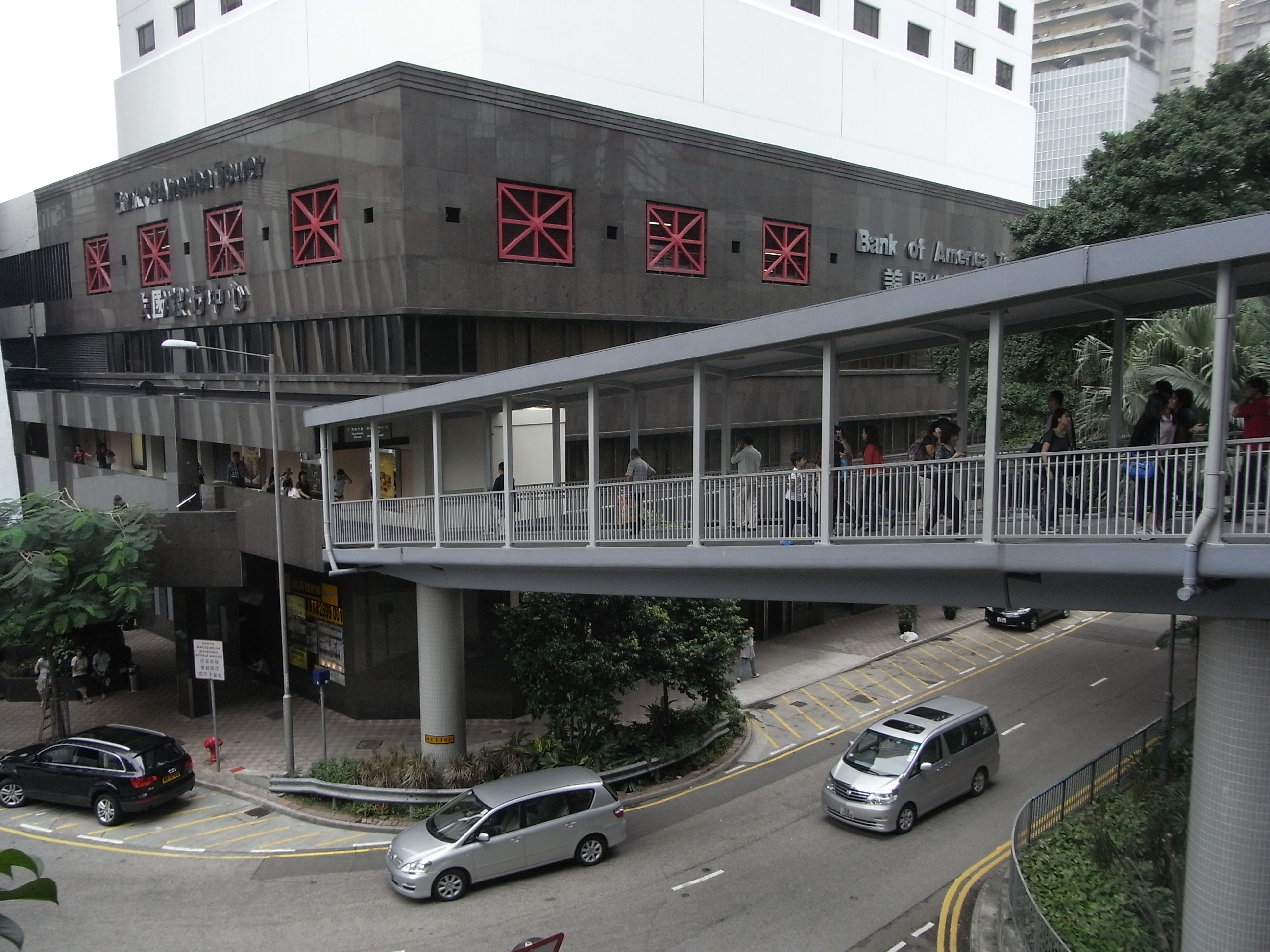
Lambeth Walk near Bank of America Tower

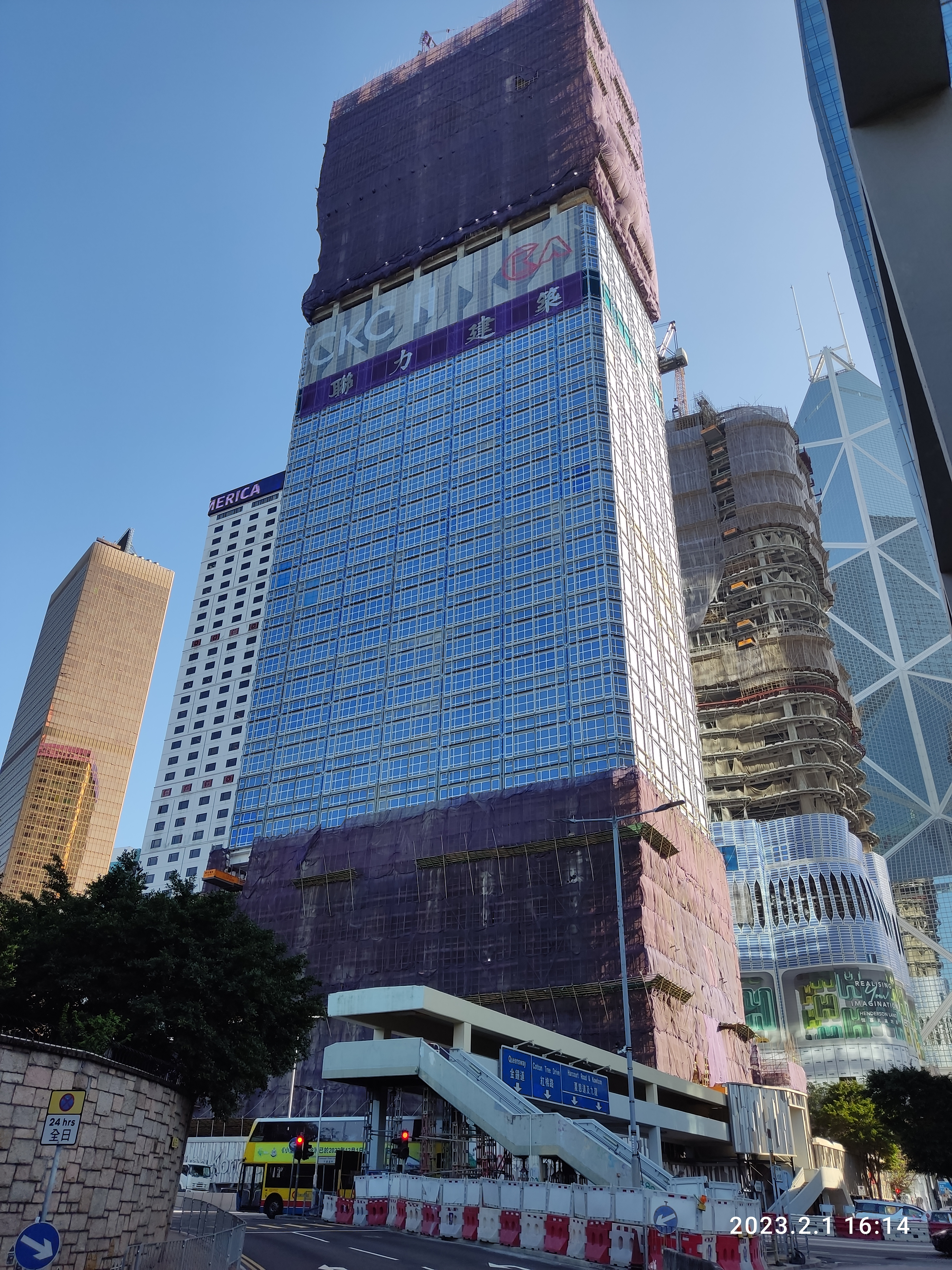
Lambeth Walk near Cheung Kong Centre II

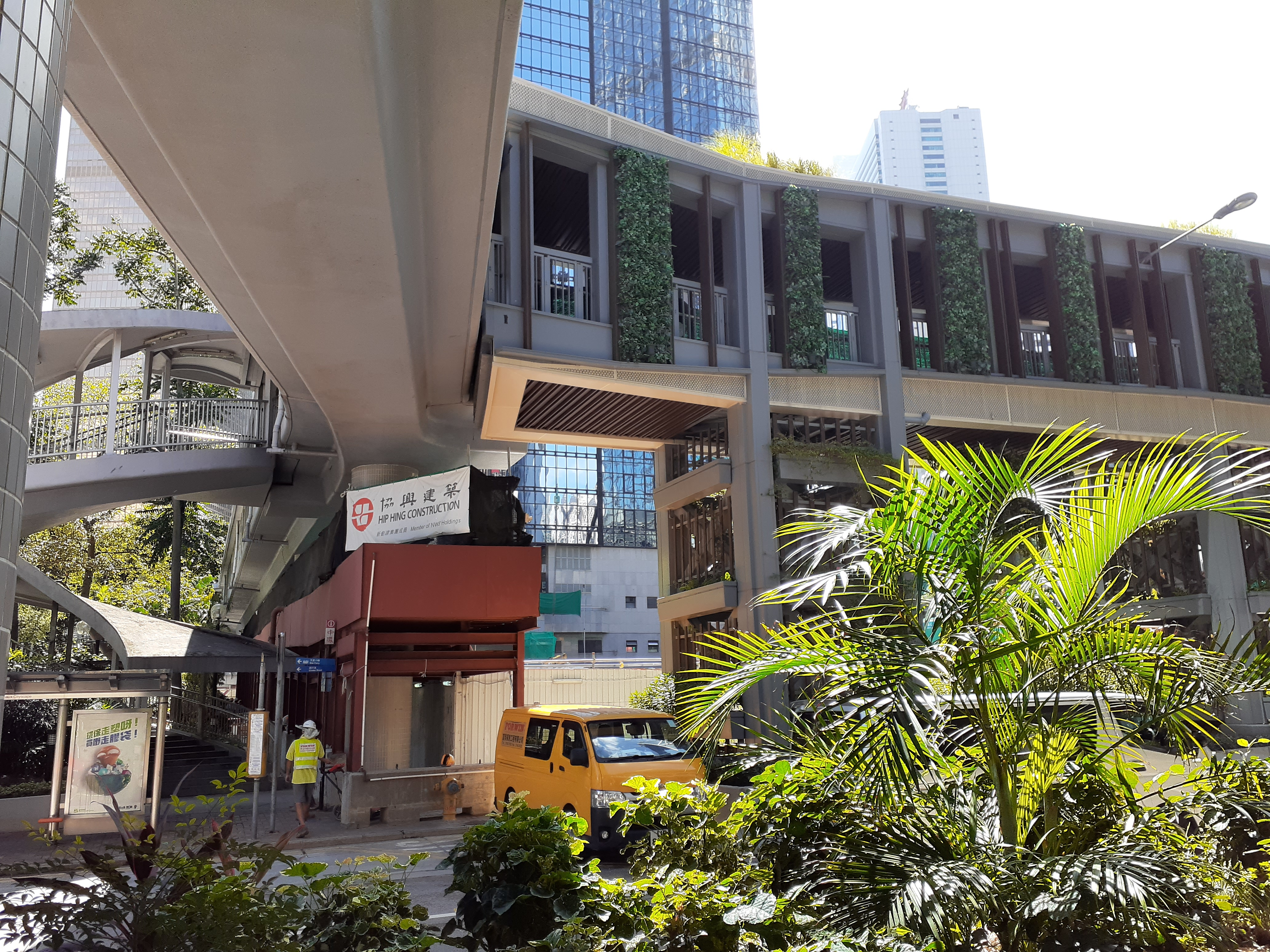
Lambeth Walk Rest Garden

The area surrounded by Harcourt Road, Cotton Tree Drive, Murray Road and Queensway was originally a parking lot and was only developed in the 1970s. Among them, Lambeth Walk was built and gazetted in 1975. At that time, it was an eastbound one-way road.

The government of Hong Kong announced on December 13, 1985, that it planned to build a covered elevated pedestrian system along Lambeth Walk to the north of the Murray Road multi-storey car park in Central District to connect the pedestrian paths of Admiralty Station of the Mass Transit Railway, Chater Garden and Queensway Flyover.

As part of the "Connaught Road Improvement Project", the Lambeth Walk was changed from a two-way to a one-way westbound traffic on November 8, 1987.

Henderson Land successfully won the bid for the No. 2 Murray Road development project in Central in 2017, and proposed to the Policy Innovation and Coordination Office to optimize the adjacent Lambeth Walk Rest Garden.
