= Gbenga Dairo =

Nigerian engineer and politician

Engr. Gbenga Dairo

Commissioner for Transport of Ogun State
- Incumbent
- Assumed office June 2019
- Governor: Dapo Abiodun

Personal details
- Born: Ogun State, Nigeria
- Education: University of Lagos, Imperial College London, Kingston University
- Occupation: Engineer, politician

Gbenga Dairo is a Nigerian engineer and politician. Since June 2019, he has served as the Commissioner for Transport in Ogun State.

== Education ==
Dairo earned a bachelor's degree in engineering from the University of Lagos. He later pursued postgraduate studies at Imperial College London and obtained a Master of Business Administration (MBA) from Kingston University, United Kingdom.

== Career ==
Dairo worked with the Lagos Metropolitan Area Transport Authority (LAMATA), where he was involved in the development of the city's Bus Rapid Transit (BRT) system while serving as Director of Public Transport. He has also held advisory roles on transport projects within Nigeria and internationally.

In June 2019, he was appointed Commissioner for Transport by Ogun State governor Dapo Abiodun. He continues to hold this office.
