= Commissioner for Transport =

Commissioner for Transport may refer to:

- European Commissioner for Transport
- Commissioner for Transport (Hong Kong), head of the Hong Kong Transport Department
