= City Gallery (Hong Kong) =

Exhibition centre in Hong Kong

Coordinates: 22°16′56.84″N 114°9′43.06″E

- Traditional Chinese: 展城館
- Simplified Chinese: 展城馆
Transcriptions
Standard Mandarin
- Hanyu Pinyin: Zhǎnchéngguǎn
Yue: Cantonese
- Jyutping: zin2 sing4 gun2

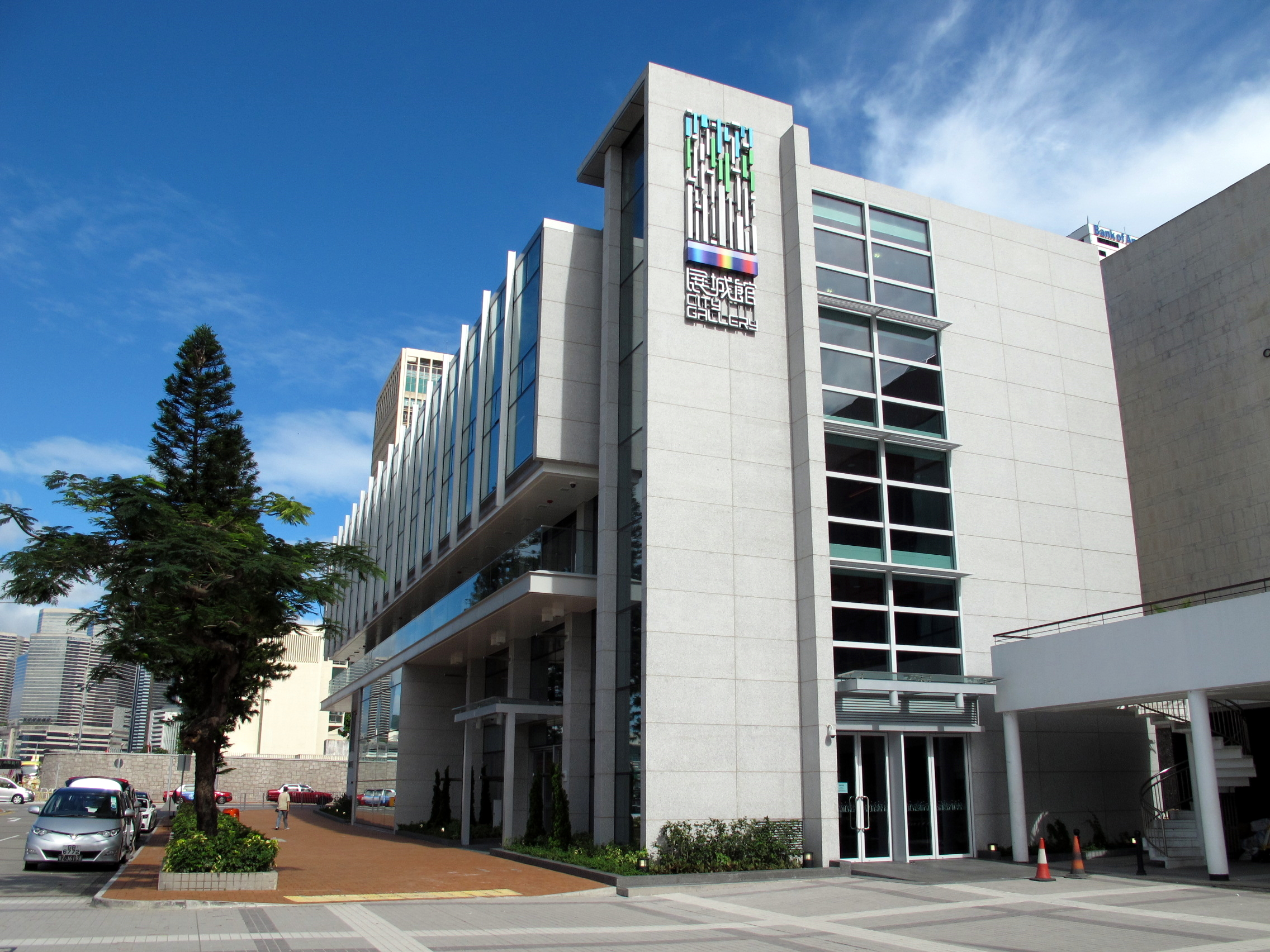
City Gallery exhibition centre in July 2012

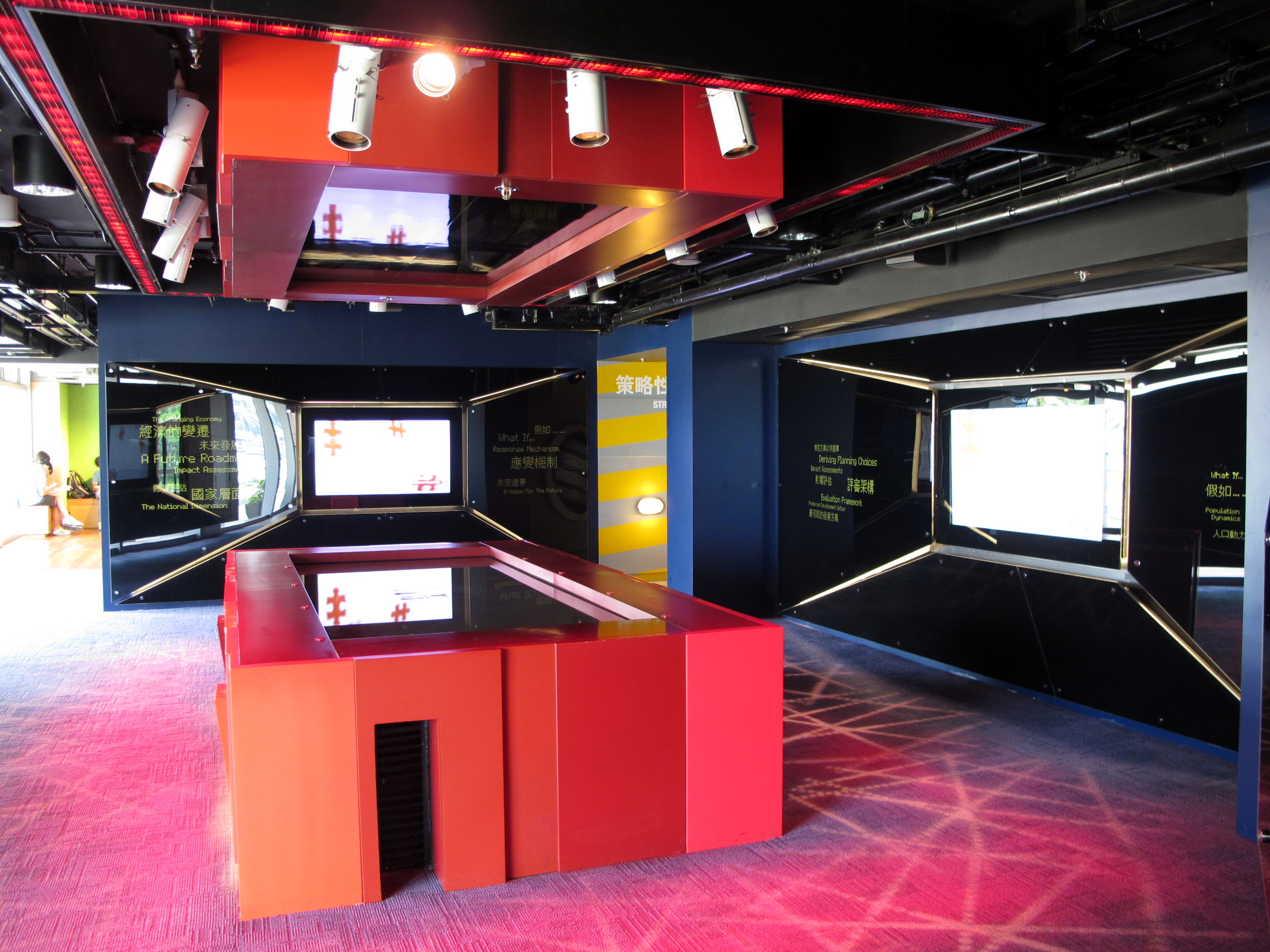
Interior of City Gallery exhibition centre in July 2013

City Gallery is an exhibition centre about the planning and development of urban areas in Hong Kong. It is located at Edinburgh Place in Central, Victoria City. It is a public relations effort of the Planning Department of the Hong Kong government.

== History ==
It was previously known as the Hong Kong Planning and Infrastructure Exhibition Gallery (Chinese: 香港規劃及基建展覽館) and was set up in 2002 on the ground floor of the City Hall annex building as a temporary exhibition gallery, pending the establishment of a full-fledged permanent exhibition gallery which will occupy the entire City Hall Annex Building.

To make way for the refurbishment and expansion works at the City Hall Annex, the temporary gallery was relocated to the ground floor of the Murray Road Multi-storey Car Park in mid-2009 to maintain continuous services to the public.

The permanent gallery reopened in the City Hall annex building on 20 August 2012.

In 2019, the revamp work has been taken in place on the G/F, the 3rd Floor and the 4th Floor and was completed in May 2021.

== Description ==
The gallery showcases the planning proposals and infrastructure projects of the Hong Kong Government. It's a building consists of fourth floors with various themes, showing numerous exhibits including Planning Eye, Hong Kong Next Century, Sustainable Hong Kong, Coastlines & Skylines and Hong Kong Now and Then etc. Interactive features and devices give visitors the latest information on planning and infrastructure developments in Hong Kong.

Admission is free of charge.

== Route ==
Ground Floor

- [Reception]
- [Planning Eye]- looking at the journey of Hong Kong's planning and infrastructure development in a glimpse
- [Great World Cities]- comparing basic information of Hong Kong and 10 other world cities through our interactive screen
- [City Impression]- showcases 10 sustainable projects in different cities
- [Unique Hong Kong]- video interviews of people about their impression towards our city
- [Thematic Exhibition Area]- holding various types of exhibitions related to architecture
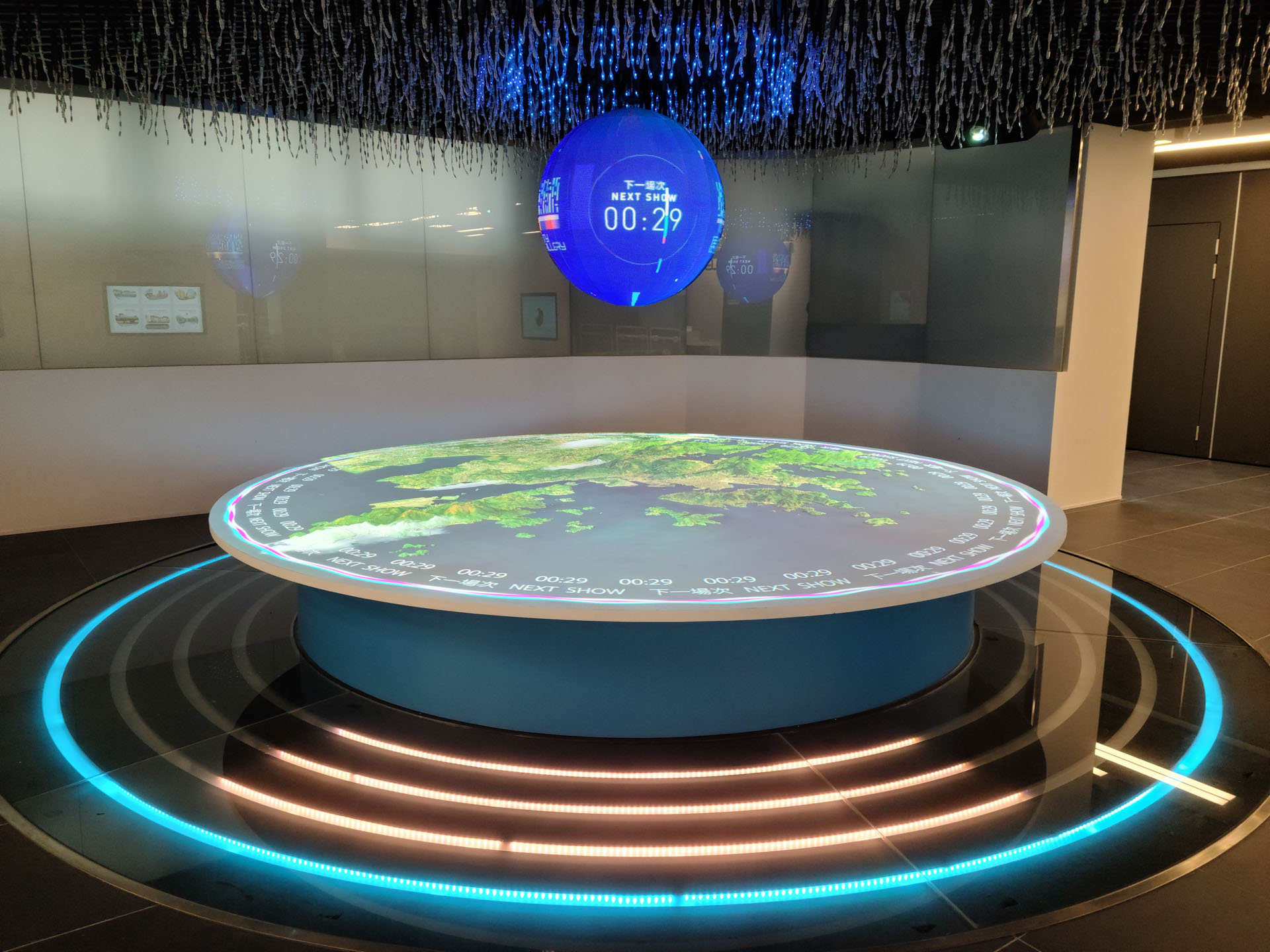
Planning Eye

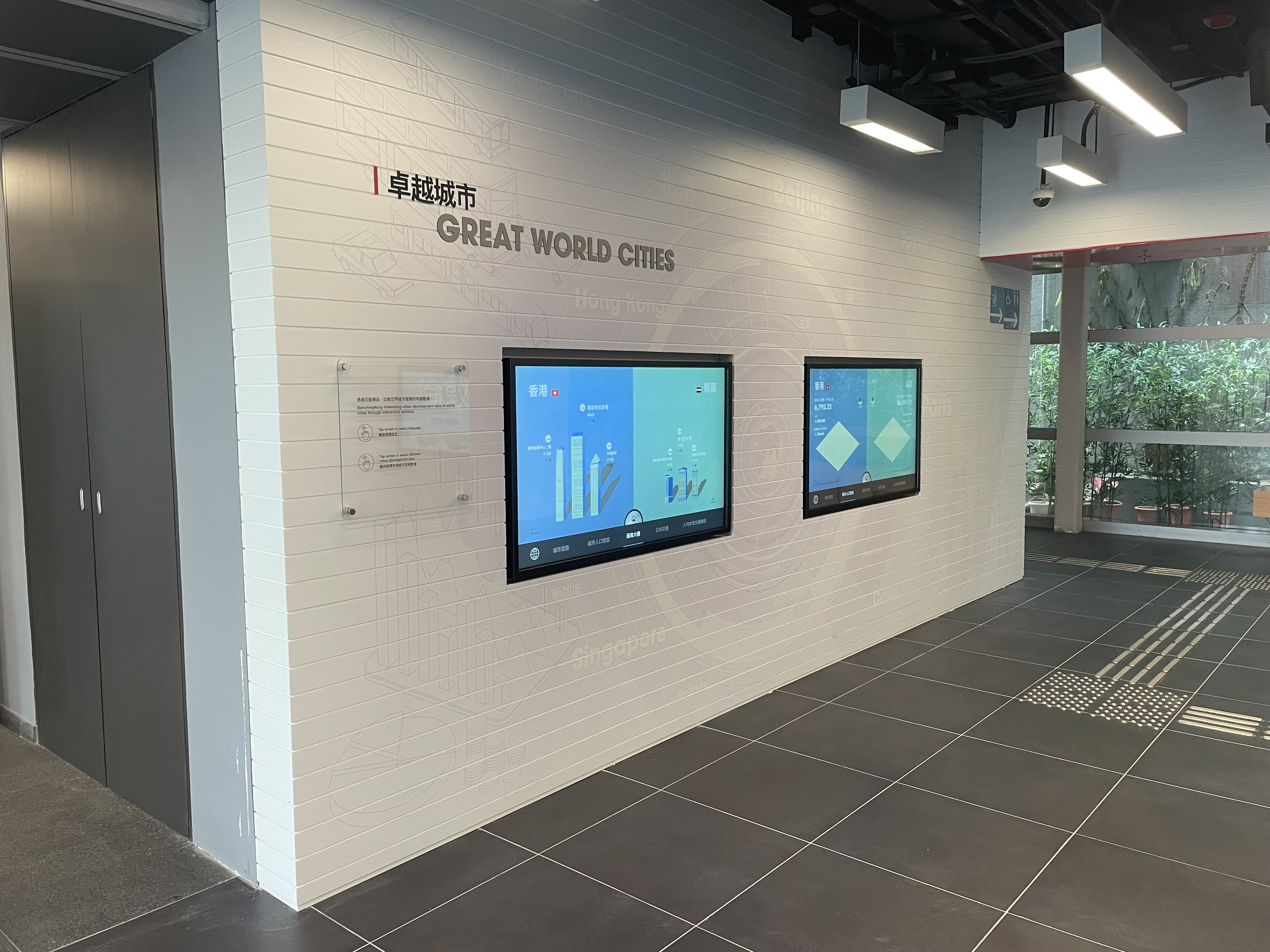
Great World Cities

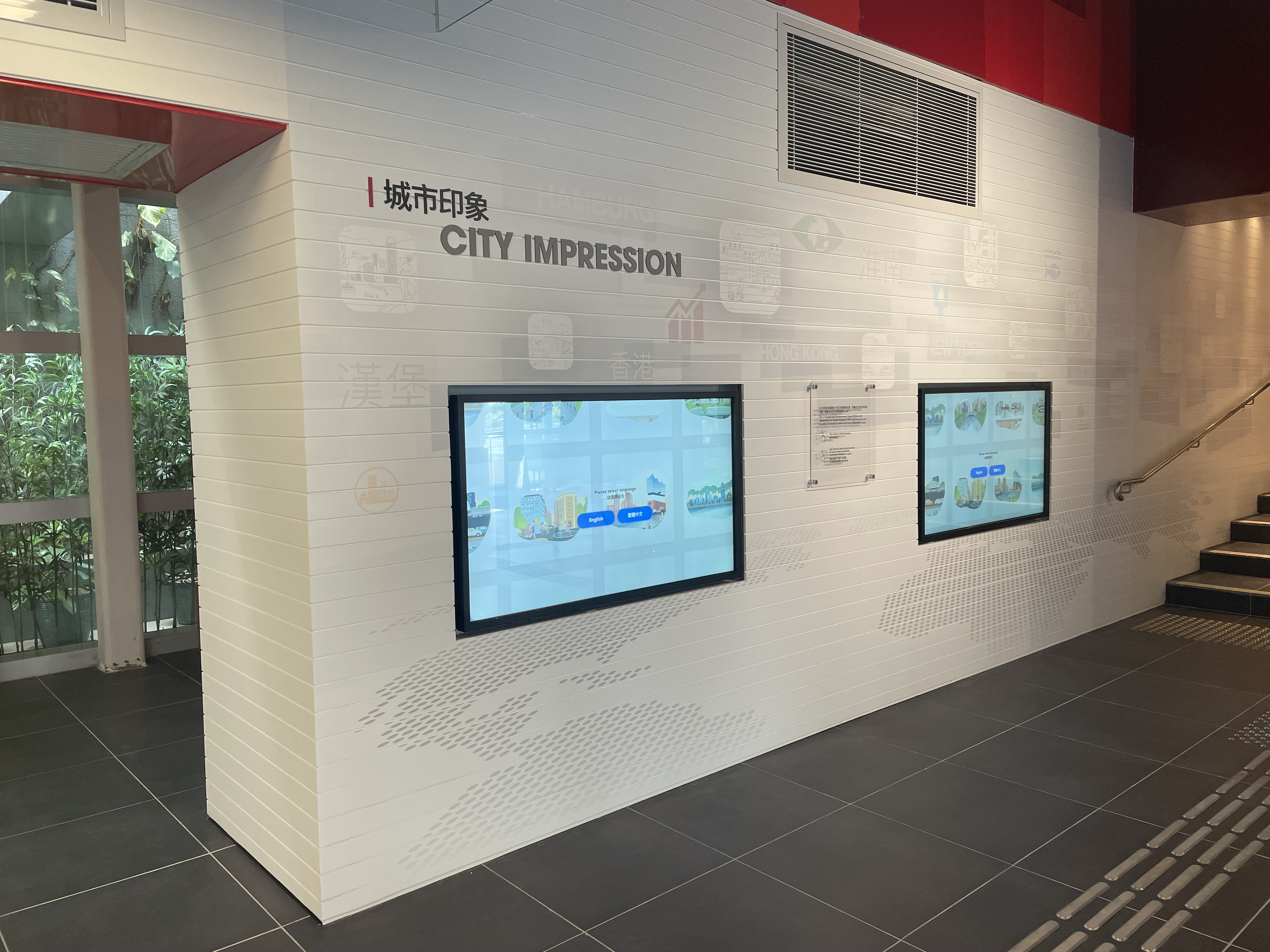
City Impression

First Floor

- [Unique Hong Kong]- displaying a collection of local unique features
- [Living Environment]- our short video will present you numerous elements and principles related to a harmonious living environment
- [Protecting Our Heritage]- our short video will present you numerous elements and principles related to a harmonious living environment
- [Hong Kong Next Century]- - visions of future from people around the world

Second Floor

- [Unique Hong Kong]- displaying a collection of local transportation features
- [Strategic Picture]- introducing the visions and goals of Hong Kong's strategic spatial planning
- [Strategic Infrastructure]- a hidden network of tunnels, cables and transportation infrastructure
- [Transportation and Communications]- introduce Hong Kong transportation network
- [Sustainable Hong Kong]- short videos about sustainable developments

Third Floor

- [Theatre 1]- a double floor hall can be used as a thematic exhibition area
- [Theatre 2]- a double floor hall can be used as a thematic exhibition area
- [Planning Timeline]- displaying history of the Hong Kong infrastructure developments through our interactive screen
- [Coastlines & Skylines]- visitors can witness the transformation of Hong Kong coastline since 1900
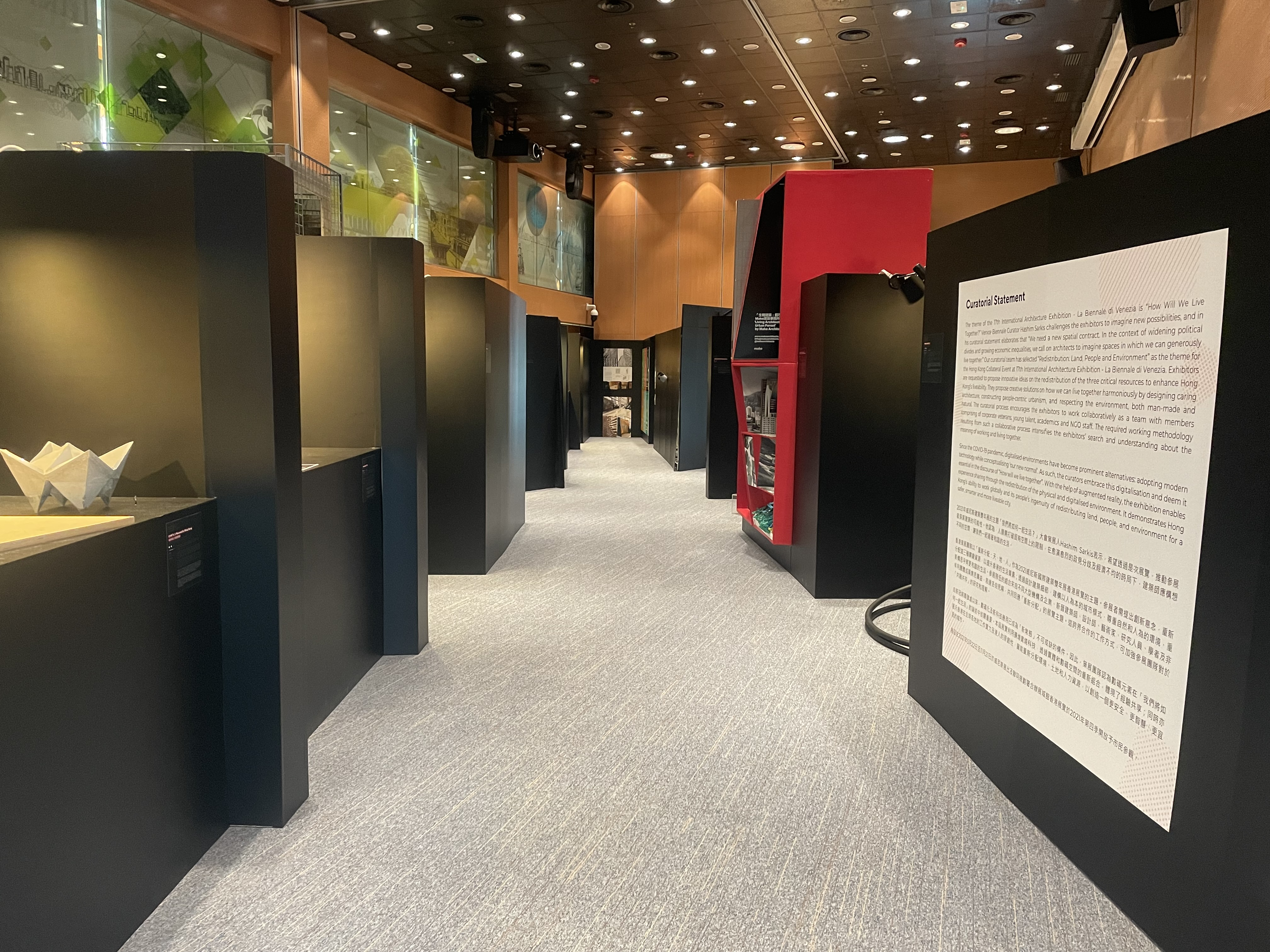
Theatre 1 & Theatre 2

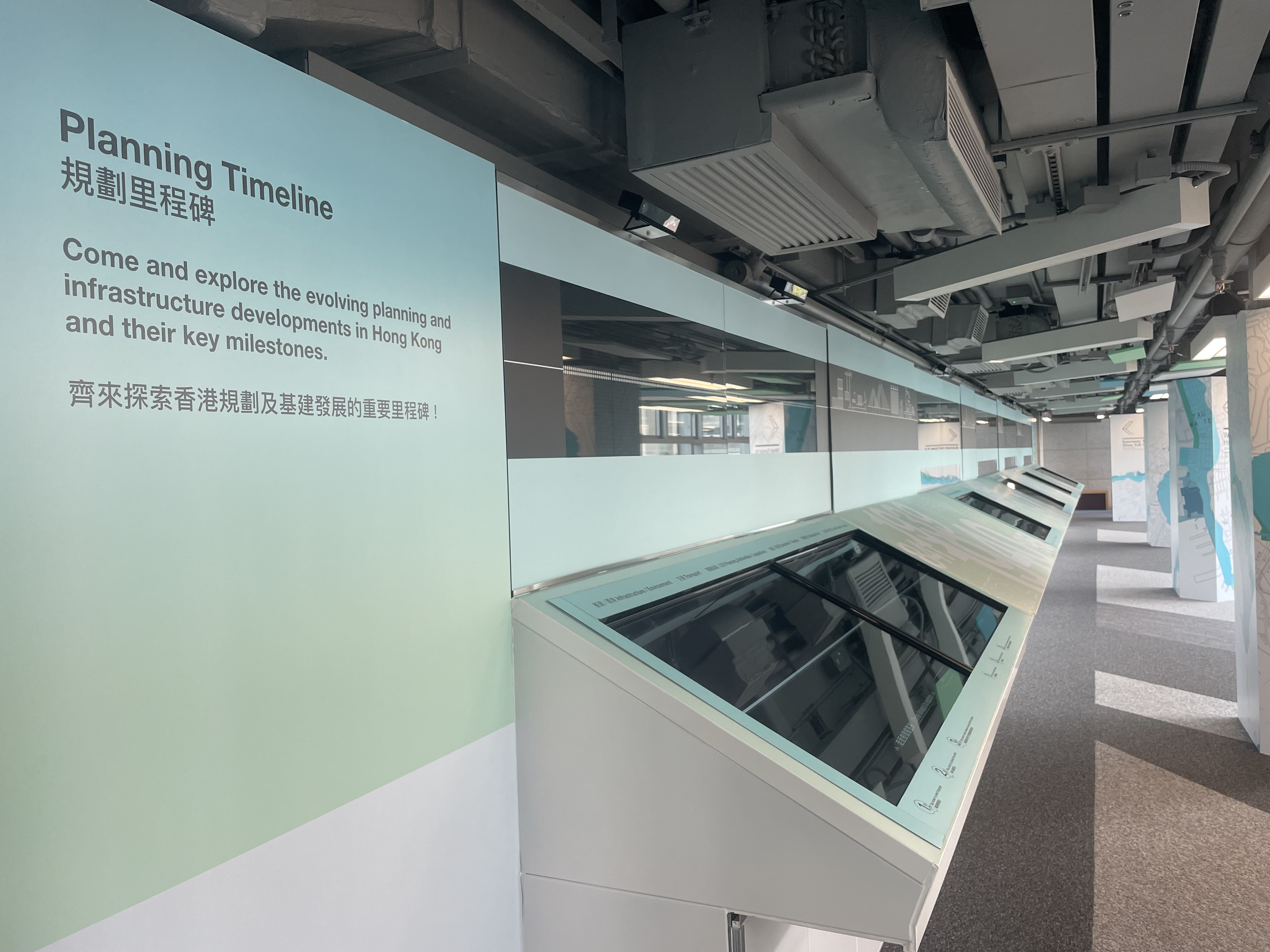
Planning Timeline

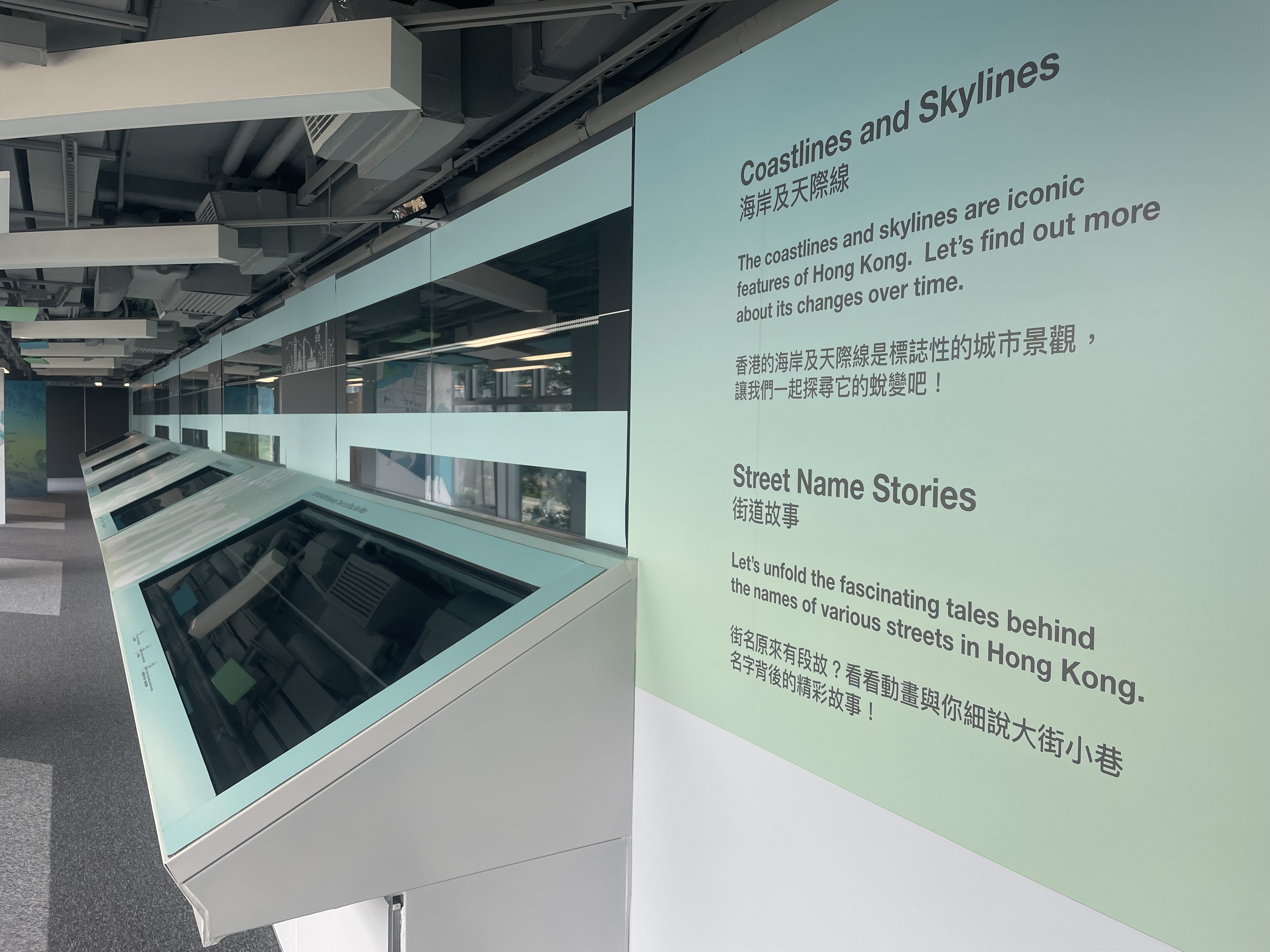
Coastlines & Skylines

Fourth Floor

- [Visionary Hong Kong 200]- photo exhibition presenting the history of the Hong Kong infrastructure development
- [Hong Kong Now and Then]- with our motion sensor, visitors can study changes of various places in Hong Kong on our interactive screen
- [Treasure Hunt]- with our motion sensor, visitors can study changes of various places in Hong Kong on our interactive screen
- [Inclusive City]- the first Tactile and Audio system to be installed permanently in Hong Kong
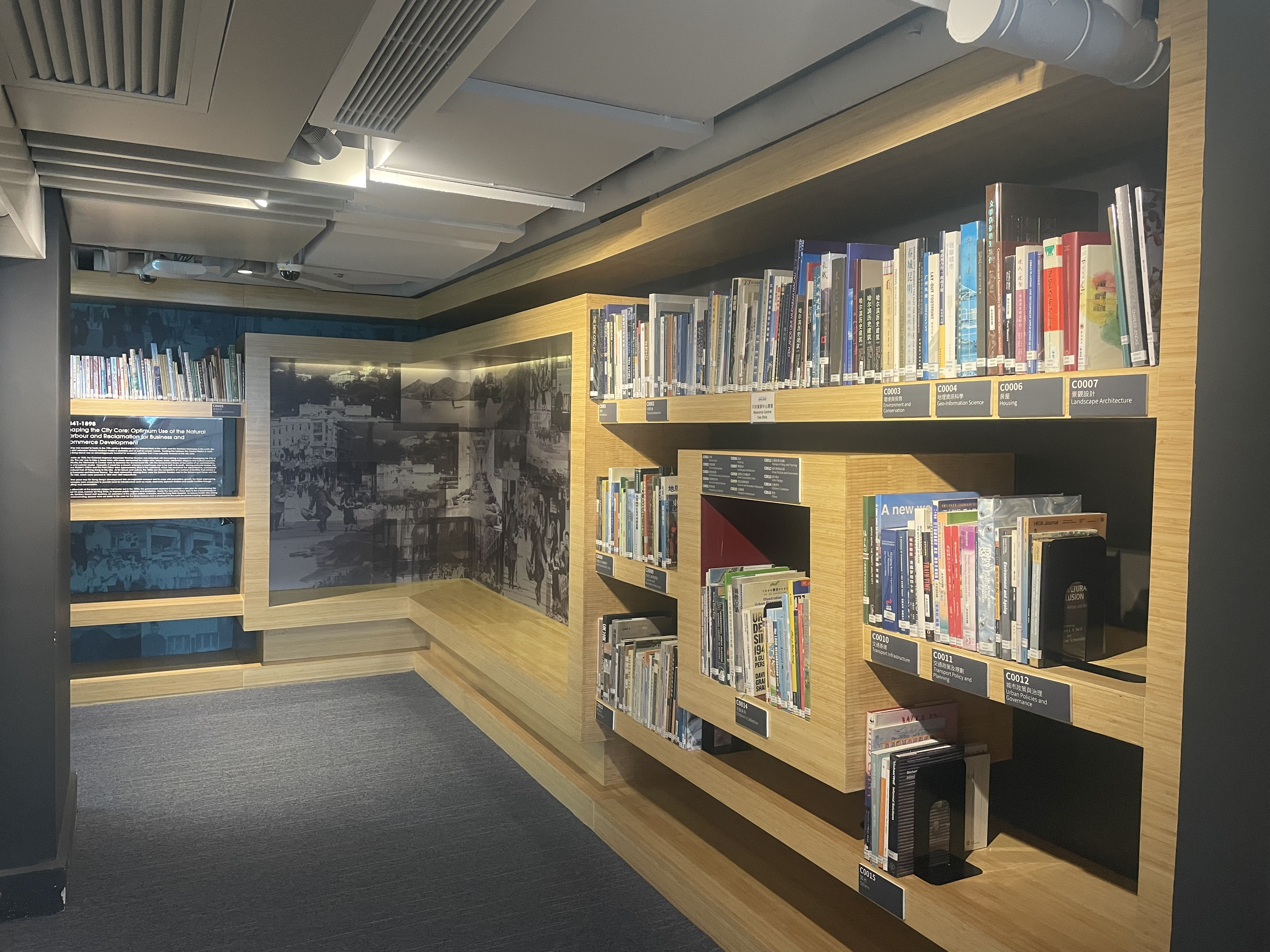
Visionary Hong Kong 200

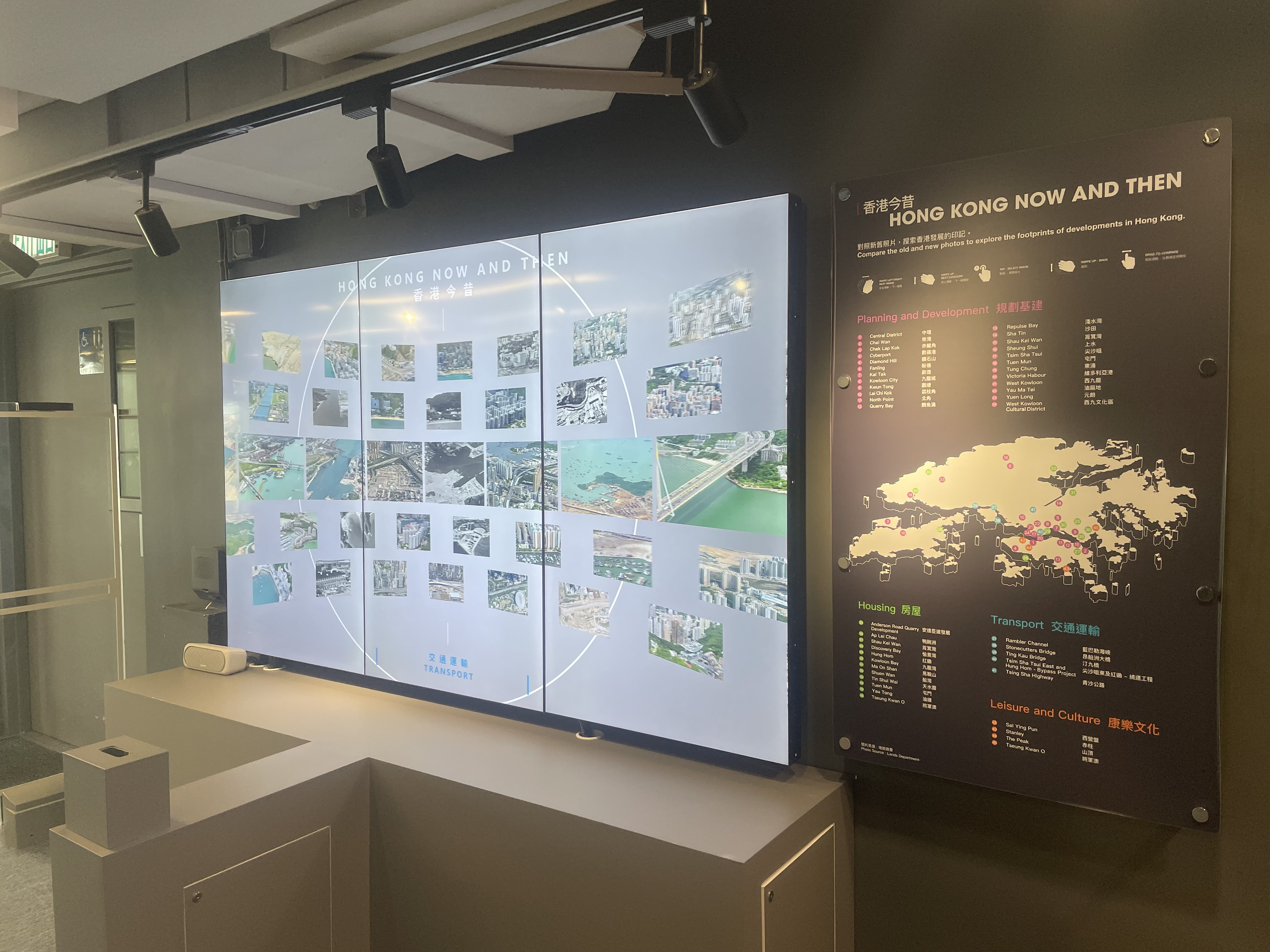
Hong Kong Now and Then

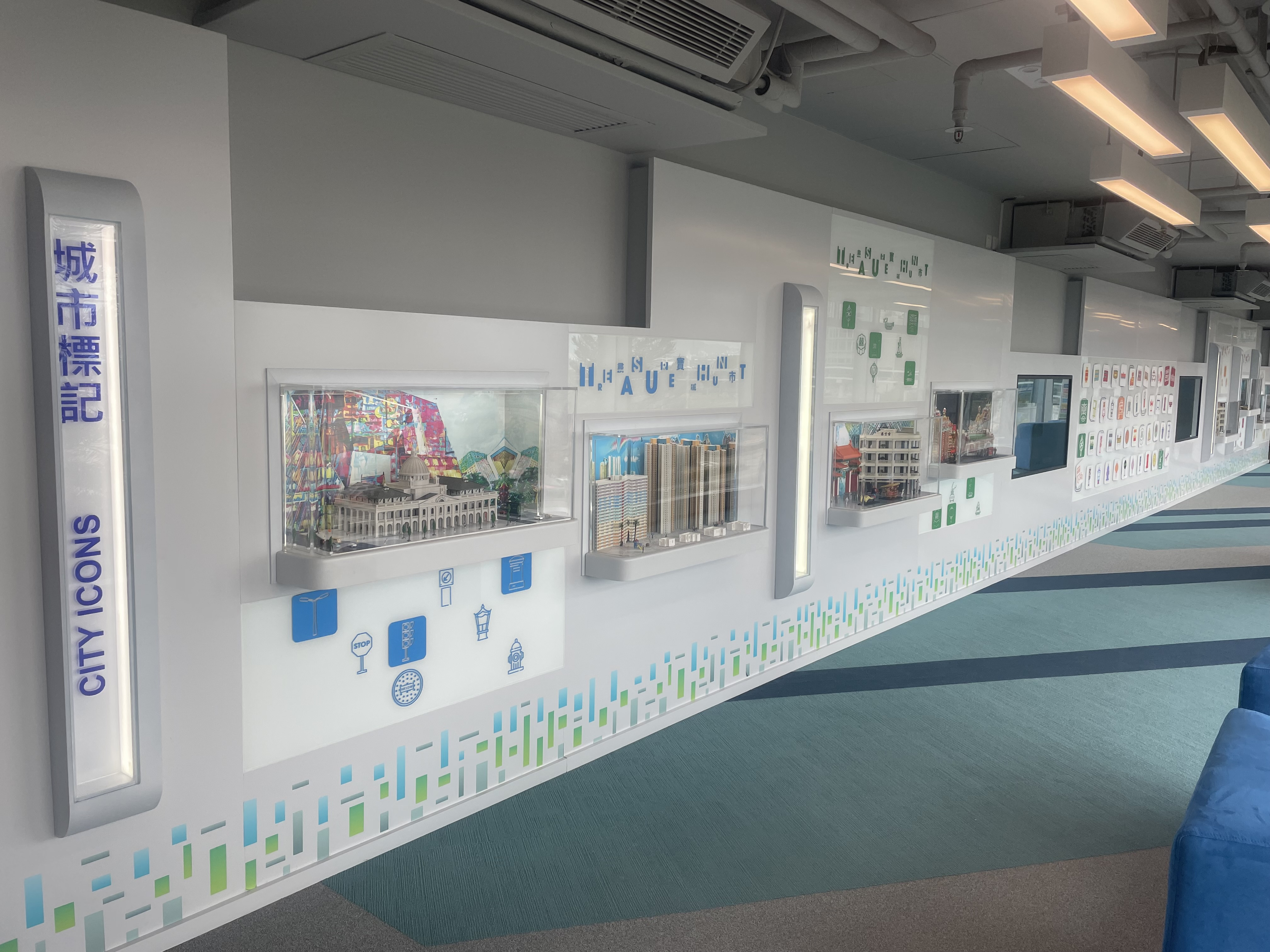
Treasure Hunt

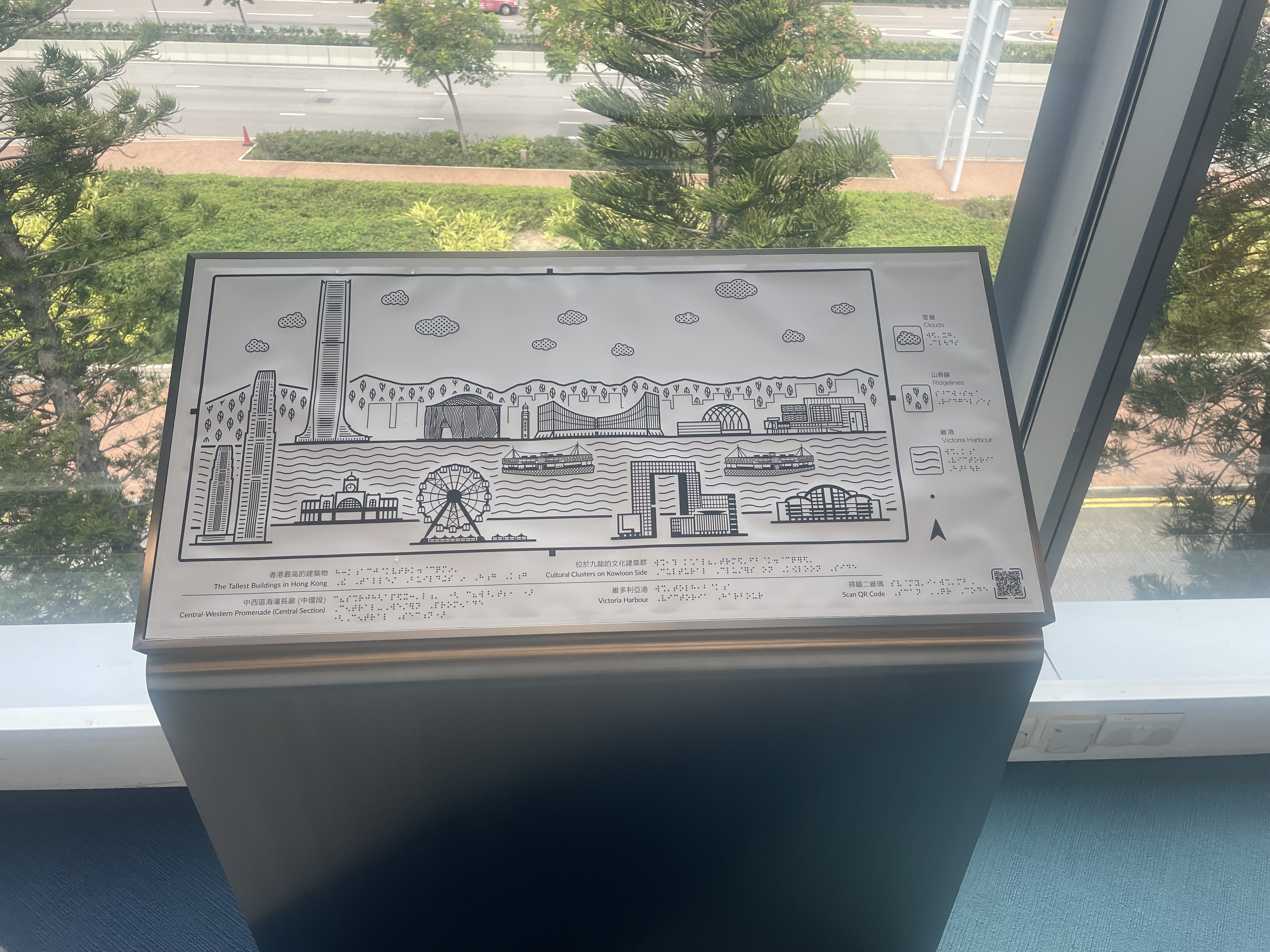
Inclusive City

== Transportation ==
The gallery is accessible within walking distance West from Central station of MTR.

Patrons can reach the City Gallery by the following public transport services:

- MTR: Admiralty Station B Exit, Central Station K Exit and Hong Kong Station A Exit
- Ferry: Star Ferry
- Bus:
- New World First Bus (2, 13, 15, 18, 18P, 18X, 720, 720P)
- Citybus (5X, 37B, 37X, 70, 70P, 260, 780, 788, 962P, 962S, 967, 969A)
- Kowloon Motor Bus (619X)
- New World First Bus and Citybus (115, 115P, 619, 619P, 680x, 690P)
- Minibus: MiniBus (8, 9, 22, 22S, 54)
- Tram: Hong Kong Tramways

== See also ==
- Architecture of Hong Kong
- List of museums in Hong Kong
