= Driving licence in Hong Kong =

Overview of driving licences in Hong Kong

Hong Kong Special Administrative Region Driving Licence 香港特別行政區駕駛執照
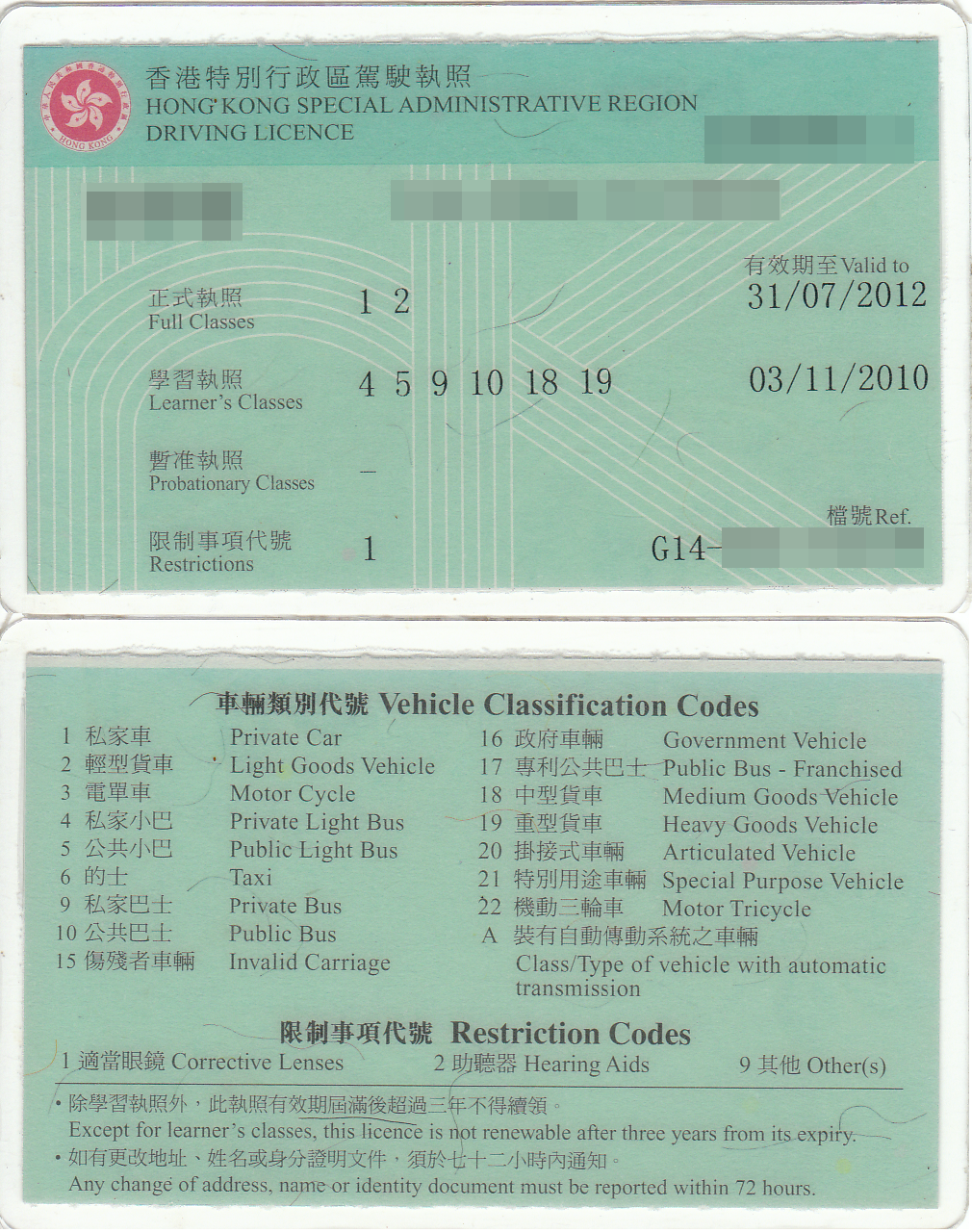
- Hong Kong driving licence issued by the Transport Department
- Type: Driving licence
- Issued by: Transport Department
- Valid in: Hong Kong
- Cost: HK$900 (full licence)
- Website: td.gov.hk

Driving licence in Hong Kong
- Traditional Chinese: 香港駕駛執照
Transcriptions
Yue: Cantonese
- Yale Romanization: Hēung góng gaa sái jāp jiu
- Jyutping: Hoeng1 gong2 gaa3 sai2 zap1 ziu3

The Hong Kong Special Administrative Region Driving Licence is issued by the Transport Department of the Government of Hong Kong. A full driving licence is valid for 10 years (unless the driver is approaching 60 years of age) and is compulsory in order to drive a motor vehicle. Most driving licences are issued after the applicant passed a driving test for the respective type of vehicles. They may be issued without a test if the applicant is a holder of an overseas driving licence issued on passing a driving test in an approved country.

== Format ==
Hong Kong driving licenses are usually required to be presented together with identification documents, and therefore contain limited entries of personal information. Current driving licenses issued since October 28, 2002 contains following particulars:

- The holder's name in Chinese* and name in English (*only applicable to Hong Kong residents with Chinese name displayed on their Hong Kong Identity Card)
- Driving license number, same with the holder's Hong Kong Identity Card number or travel document number. For drivers holding travel documents, an additional letter is added for classification: "C" after Two-Way Permit numbers, "P" after passport numbers, and "Y" after other documents (e.g. Macau Identity Card, Consular Corps Identity Card etc.)
- Types of vehicles permitted to drive marked with classification codes indicated on the reverse side, and with separate validity periods for "Full Classes", "Learner's Classes," and "Probationary Classes" (if any). Generally, a full license is valid for 10 years from the date of issue.
- Reference number. If any permitted vehicle category on the license was obtained through an exchange from a foreign license, the ref. number will start with "DI"
- Encrypted QR code is added on the driving license from March 22, 2021 . (Note: Added for the Hong Kong Police Force's "Electronic Fixed Penalty Notice Pilot Scheme")

Current Hong Kong Driving Licence does not contain photo of the bearer.

== Levels of licence ==
In Hong Kong, there are three levels of driving licences: learner's licence, provisional licence and full licence.

=== Learner's licence ===
A new driver can start to learn to drive only a private car (class 1), light goods vehicle (class 2), motorcycle (class 3) or motor tricycle (class 22), while most other classes are considered commercial vehicles and require a driver to have certain experience to learn them.

A person can apply for a learner's licence even before passing the written test (with the exception of motorcycle and motor tricycle).

A driver with a learner's licence may drive on any public road, except roads not permitted for learners, motorways and tunnels, under the following conditions:

- carrying an L-plate at the front and back of the vehicle
- in specified times
- with the supervision of a qualified driving instructor (except motorcycle or motor tricycle)
- carrying no other passenger other than the driving instructor, test examiners and one other learner

A learner's licence is valid for 1 year and can be renewed.

In order to apply for a motorcycle / motor tricycle learner's licence, the driver has to first attend a compulsory course in a driving school and pass the compulsory test, after then, he/she can apply for the learner's licence and learn driving on streets. Unlike other classes of vehicles, no driving instructor is necessary when learning driving a motorcycle / motor tricycle.

=== Probationary licence ===
After 1 October 2000, any person who applies to take a motorcycle or motor tricycle driving test is required to apply for a probationary driving licence upon passing the test. This scheme was extended to private cars and light goods vehicles in 2009. The holder of a probationary driving licence needs to undergo a 12-month probationary period. The probationary period will be extended by 6 months if convicted of a minor road traffic offence, and the licence will be cancelled if convicted of a serious road traffic offence.

A driver with a probationary licence may drive on any public road under the following conditions:

- carrying a P-plate at the front and back of the vehicle
- limited to 70 km/h, even if the speed limit of the road is greater
- cannot use the right lane on a motorway with 3 lanes or more, except when exiting on the right
- cannot carry a passenger on a motorcycle.

Light goods vehicles drivers are exempt from this scheme and can apply for a full licence after passing the test if he/she is considered an "experienced driver", i.e. have already held the full private car driving licence for 3 years, or 2 years after converting from a probationary licence, immediately before the application.

A probationary licence is valid for 1 year when first applied and can be renewed by half a year if the probationary period is not yet over for a certain class of vehicle.

=== Full licence ===
After finishing the probationary period, the driver may apply for a full licence, valid for 10 years unless approaching 60 years of age. For commercial vehicles, the driver may apply for a full licence after passing the test.

== Vehicle Classification Code ==
Code	Vehicle Classification	Vehicle Classification Definition	Commercial licence	A/T	Probationary licence	Licences you get w/o exam if you have the licence	Other details
1	Private Car	A motor vehicle constructed or adapted for use solely for the carriage of a driver and not more than 7 passengers and their personal effects but does not include an invalid carriage, motor cycle, motor tricycle or taxi	✗	✓	✓	-	-
2	Light Goods Vehicle	A goods vehicle having a permitted gross vehicle weight not exceeding 5.5 tonnes	✗	✓	✓	1 (Private Car)	Holders of class 2A are eligible for applying class 1A only
3	Motorcycle	A two-wheeled motor vehicle with or without a sidecar	✗	✓	✓	22 (Motor Tricycle, M/T only)	Holders of class 3A are not eligible for applying class 22 licence
4	Private Light Bus	A motor vehicle constructed or adapted for use solely for the carriage of a driver and not more than 19 passengers and their personal effects with weight not exceeding 8.5 tonnes and total length not exceeding 7.5 meters, but does not include an invalid carriage, motor cycle, motor tricycle, private car or taxi. A private light bus means a school private light bus or a light bus (other than a school private light bus) used or intended for use otherwise than for hire or reward or exclusively for the carriage of persons who are disabled persons and persons assisting them, whether or not for hire or reward; A public light bus means a light bus, other than any private light bus, which is used or intended for use for hire or reward	✓	✗	✗	Applicants only need to pass one exam only to obtain both licences (4,5)	
5	Public Light Bus		✓	✗	✗	Applicants only need to pass one exam only to obtain both licences (4,5)	Besides having a driving test, applicants of class 5 need to pass a pre-employment course
6	Taxi	A motor vehicle which is registered as a taxi under "Road Traffic Ordinance Ordinance" (Cap. 374) of "Hong Kong Law"	✓	✓	✗	-	Applicants need to pass a written exam about general legal requirements about taxi operations, knowledge about Hong Kong Street and the Road Users' Code
9	Private Bus	A motor vehicle constructed or adapted for the carriage of a driver and more than 19 passengers and their personal effects. A private bus means a bus used or intended for use otherwise than for hire or reward or for the carriage of passengers who are exclusively the students, teachers and employees of an educational institution or disabled persons and persons assisting them, whether or not for hire or reward; A public bus means a bus, other than any private bus, which is used or intended for use for hire or reward	✓	✓	✗	4,5 (Light Buses) Applicants only need to pass one exam only to obtain both licences (9,10)	Holders of class 9,10 may drive franchise buses without applying for class 17 licence. Holders of class 9A, 10A are eligible for applying class 4A, 5A only. Besides having a driving test, applicants of class 10 need to pass a pre-employment course
10	Public Bus		✓	✓	✗	4,5 (Light Buses) Applicants only need to pass one exam only to obtain both licences (9,10)	Holders of class 9,10 may drive franchise buses without applying for class 17 licence. Holders of class 9A, 10A are eligible for applying class 4A, 5A only. Besides having a driving test, applicants of class 10 need to pass a pre-employment course
15	Invalid Carriage	A motor vehicle especially designed and constructed for the sole use of a person suffering from physical defects or disabilities	✗	✗	✗	-	
16	Government Vehicle	A vehicle owned by the Government	✗	✗	✗	-	Applicants have to be a public servant
17	Public Bus - Franchised	A motor vehicle constructed or adapted for the carriage of a driver and more than 19 passengers and their personal effects in respect of which a franchise is in force under the "Public Bus Services Ordinance" (Cap. 230) of "Hong Kong Law"	✓	✓	✗	4,5 (Light Buses); 9,10 (Buses)	Applicants have to be an employee of a franchised bus company. Since currently all franchised buses in Hong Kong are automatic transmission, unless the applicant is a holder of class 18 or 19, he or she is eligible for applying class 17A only. Holders of class 17A are eligible for applying class 4A, 5A, 9A, 10A only
18	Medium Goods Vehicle	A goods vehicle having a permitted gross vehicle weight exceeding 5.5 tonnes but not exceeding 24 tonnes	✓	✗	✗	2 (Light Goods Vehicle)	
19	Heavy Goods Vehicle	A goods vehicle having a permitted gross vehicle weight exceeding 24 tonnes but not exceeding 38 tonnes	✓	✗	✗	2 (Light Goods Vehicle); 18 (Medium Goods Vehicle)	
20	Articulated Vehicle	A motor vehicle with a trailer so attached that part of the trailer is superimposed upon the motor vehicle, and when the trailer is uniformly loaded a substantial part of the weight of the load is borne by the motor vehicle	✓	✗	✗	19 (Heavy Goods Vehicle)	Requires class 18/19 licence as prerequisite
21	Special Purpose Vehicle	A motor vehicle designed, constructed or adapted primarily for a use other than the carriage on a road of goods, the driver or passengers. E.g. Street washing vehicle, arrow vehicle, ice cream vehicle, road construction vehicle, food trucks etc.	✓	✗	✗	-	Requires class 2/18/19 licence as prerequisite
22	Motor Tricycle	A three-wheeled motor vehicle other than a motor cycle with a sidecar and a village vehicle	✗	✗	✓	-	

=== Disused codes ===
- 7 Public car
- 8 Goods vehicle (with weight exceeding 2.25 tonnes)
  - In the past, class 2 was vans with weight not exceeding 2.25 tones, and issuing class 1 (private car) licence could also automatically issue class 2
  - Now replaced by classes 18, 19 and 20
- 11 New Territories taxi
  - In the past, class 6 was Hong Kong and Kowloon taxi
  - Now merged and replaced with class 6
- 12 public omnibus (double decker and Guy Arab single decked bus only)
- 13 public omnibus (double decker and Seddon single decked midibus only)
  - Classes 12 and 13 are both replaced by class 17
- 14 motor-assisted pedal cycle
  - Hong Kong no longer licenses moped to drive on public roads

== Direct issue of a driving licence ==
As stated on the application form for direct issue of full Hong Kong driving licence, when a person has documentary evidence to the Commissioner's satisfaction that all of the following apply, the person is eligible to direct issue of a Hong Kong licence:

- One has a full driving licence (but not an International driving permit) during the past three years issued by one of the following countries or territories: Australia, Austria, Bangladesh, Belgium, Bermuda, Canada, China, Denmark, Finland, France, Germany, Guernsey, India, Iceland, Ireland, the Isle of Man, Israel, Italy, Japan, Jersey, Luxembourg, Macao, Malaysia, the Netherlands, New Zealand, Nigeria, Norway, Pakistan, Portugal, Singapore, South Korea, Spain, Sweden, Switzerland, South Africa, Namibia, Taiwan, the United Kingdom and the United States
- The driving entitlement(s) for which one is applying must be equivalent to the class(es) which are authorized to drive by the issuing country or place; and
  - Limited to private car, light goods vehicle, motorcycle and motor tricycle only. Other classes of driving license cannot be converted directly.
- The driving licence was obtained by passing the relevant driving test(s) in the issuing country or place; and
- Satisfies one of the three requirements below:
  - The licence was originally issued on any date during a period of residence of not less than 6 months in the country or place of issue (entry and departure stamps on a passport, school transcript or employer's testimonial with employment period specified are accepted as proof); or
  - The licence has been issued for not less than 5 years immediately before the application; or
  - Hold a passport or an equivalent travel document of the country or place in which the licence was issued.
