= The Henderson =

Skyscraper in Hong Kong

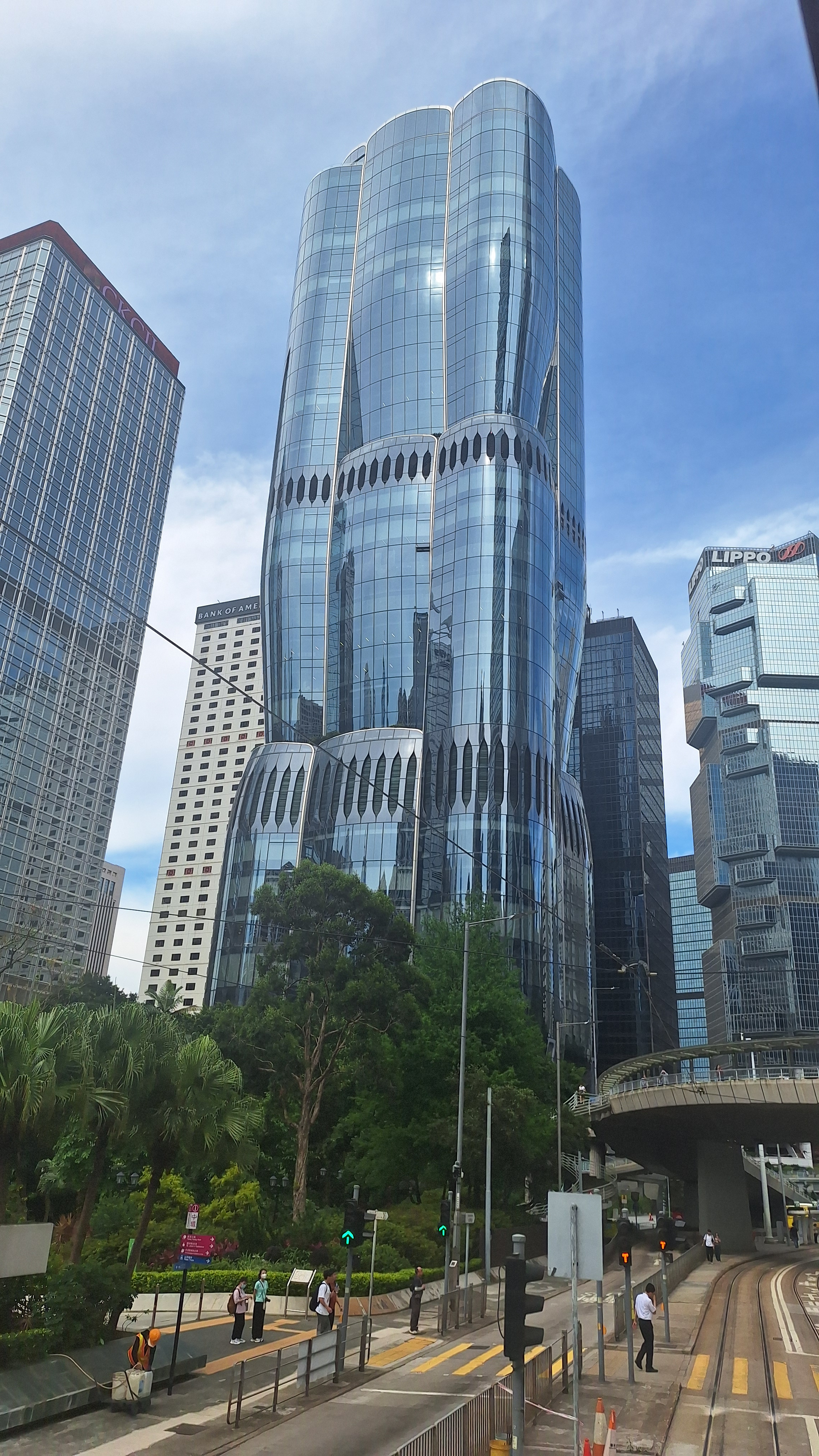
- The Henderson in 2025

General information
- Status: Completed
- Location: 2 Murray Road, Central, Hong Kong
- Coordinates: 22°16′48.62″N 114°9′43.68″E
- Construction started: 2019; 7 years ago
- Completed: 2024; 2 years ago

Height
- Height: 190 m (623 ft)

Technical details
- Floor count: 36
- Floor area: 43,200 m^{2} (465,000 sq ft)

Design and construction
- Architect: Patrik Schumacher
- Architecture firm: Zaha Hadid Architects

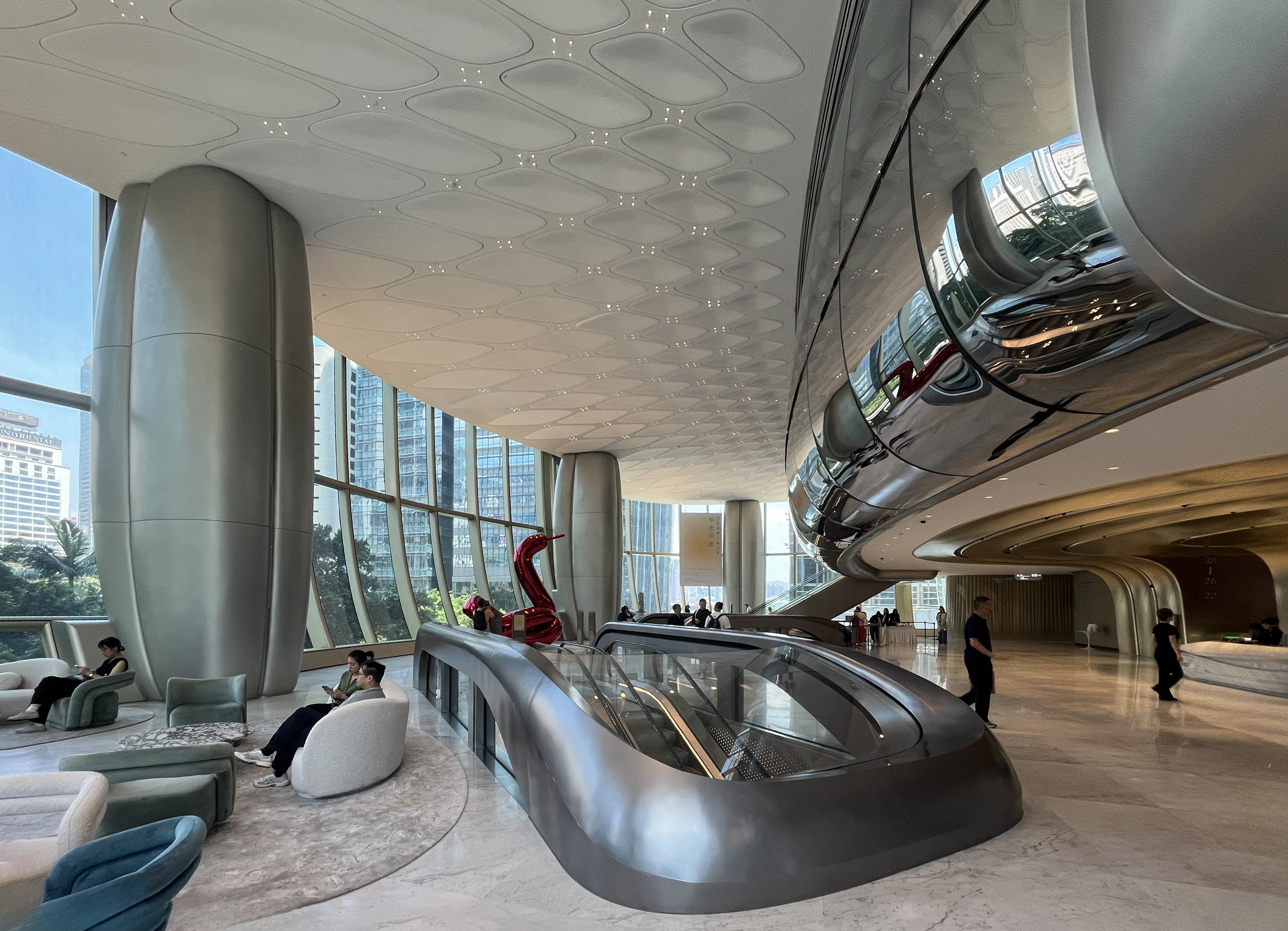
Lobby

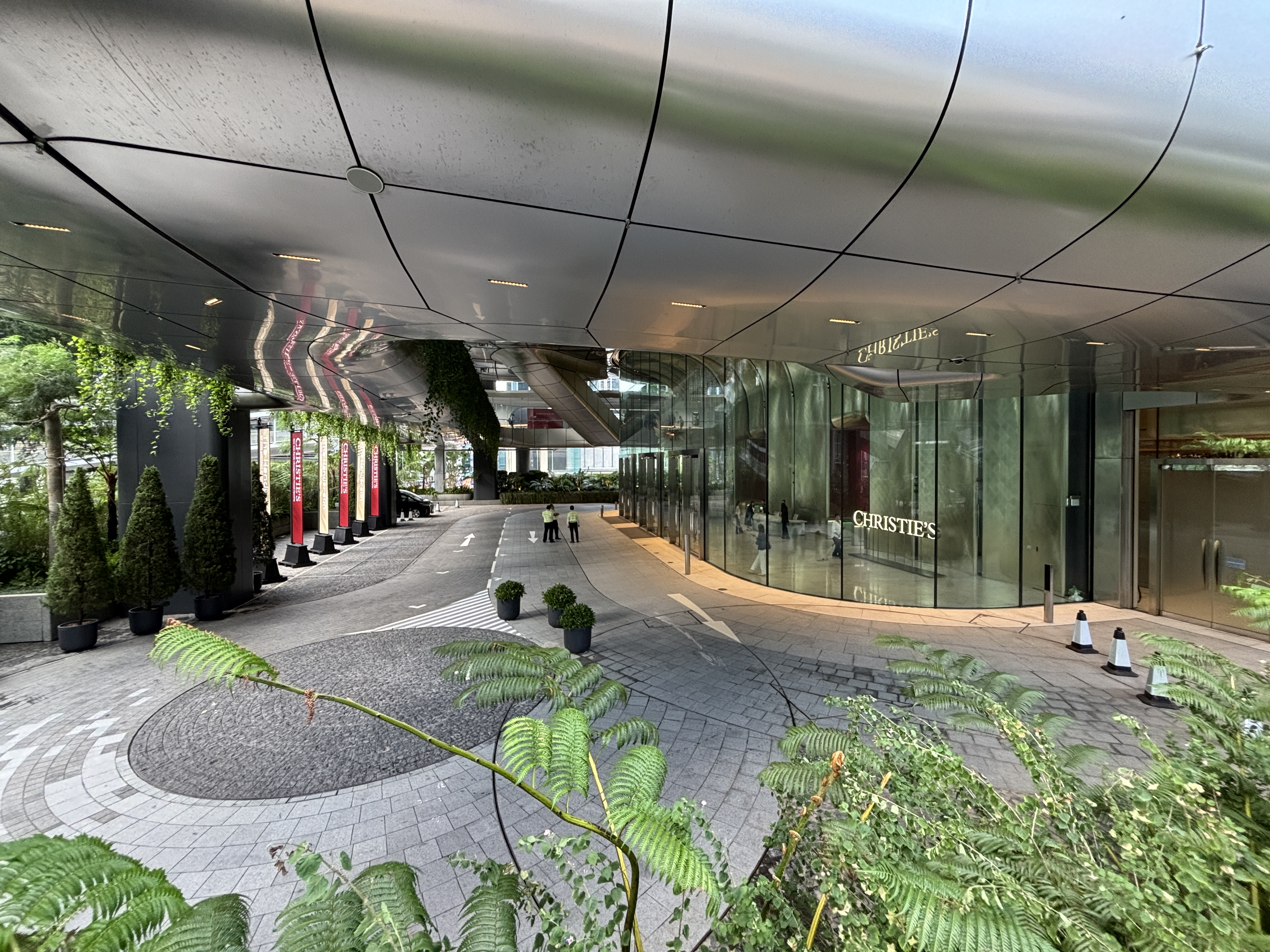
Drop off area in ground floor

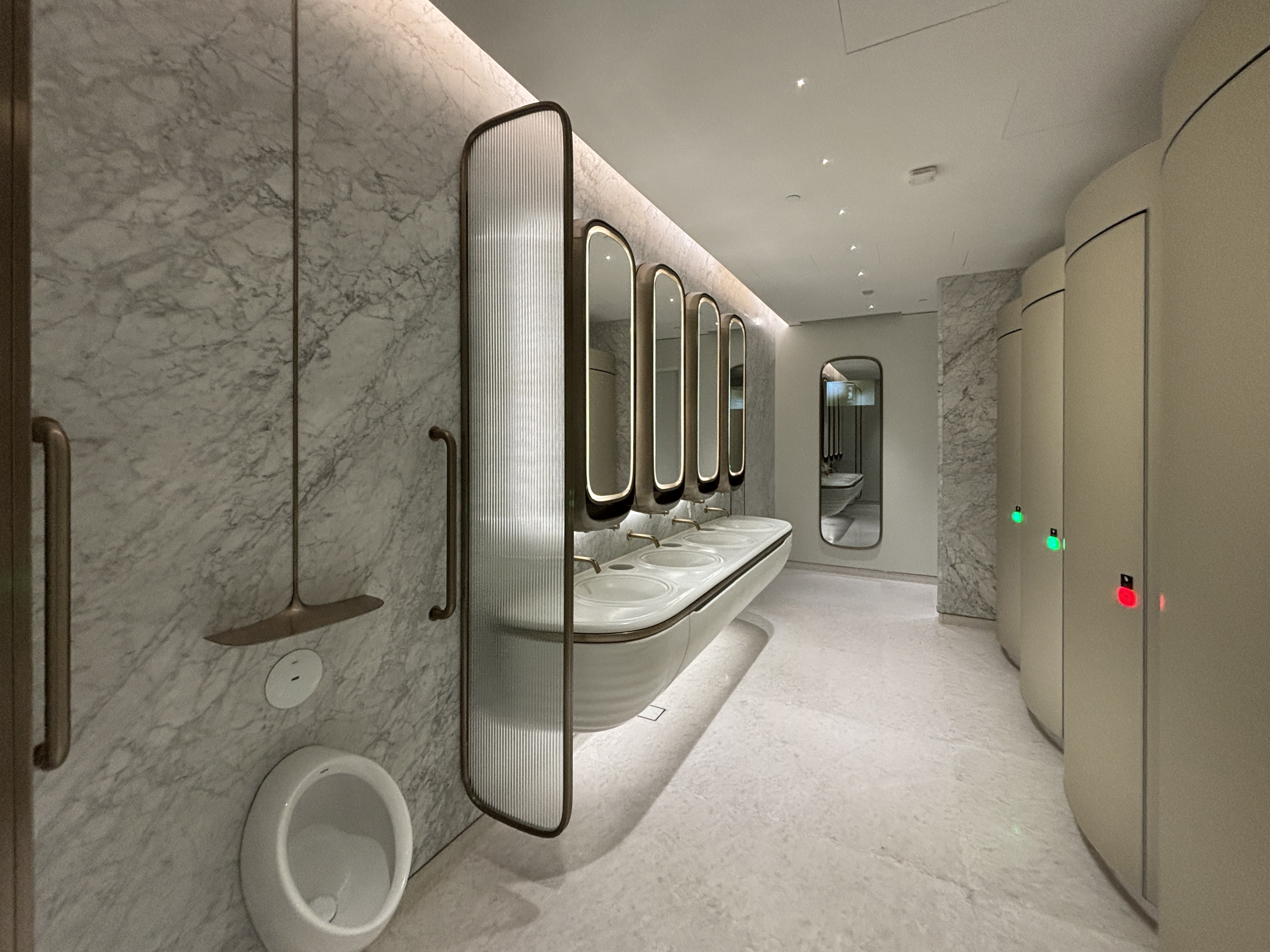
Washroom

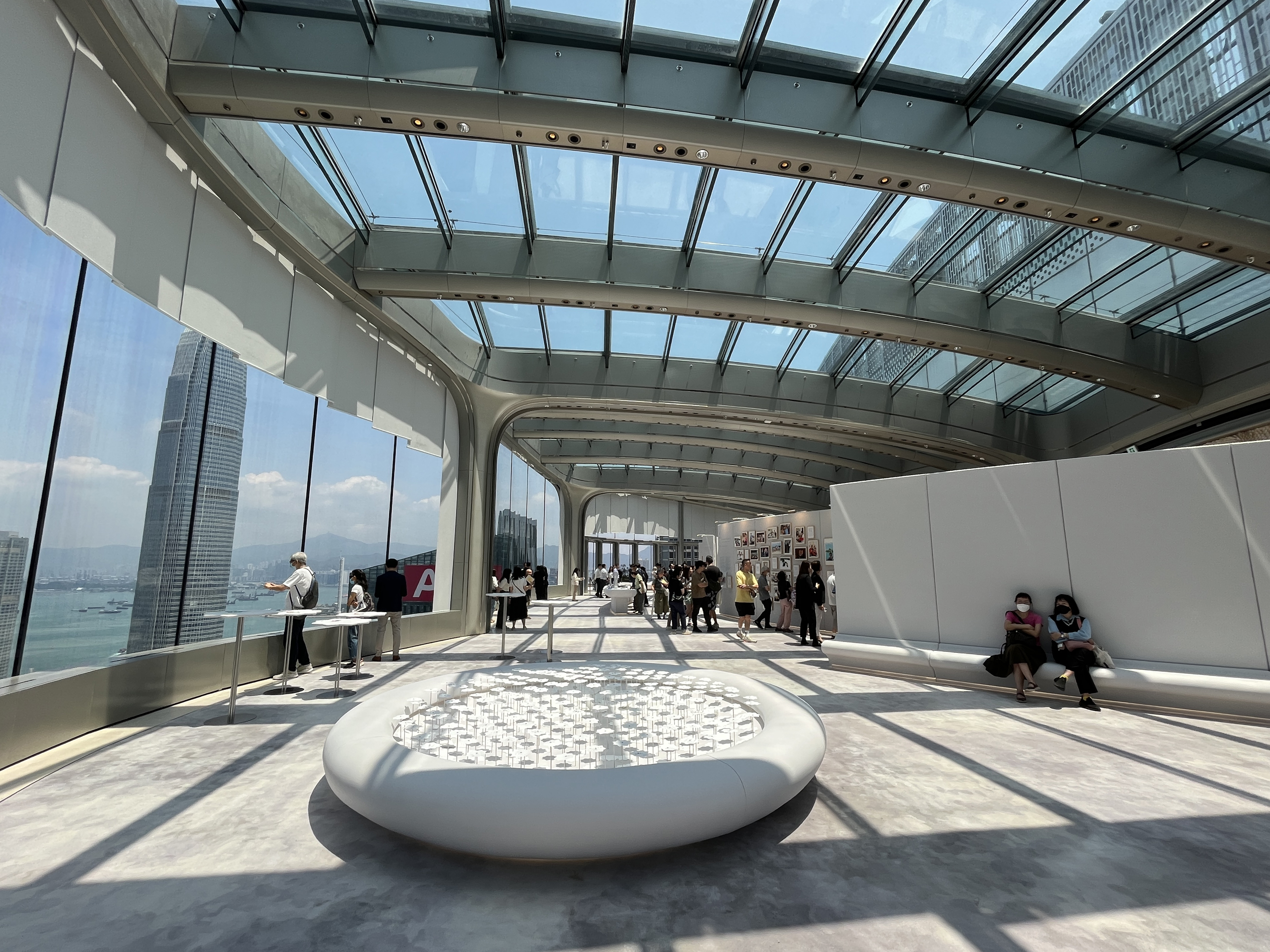
Cloud 39

The Henderson is a skyscraper in Central, Hong Kong. The 36-story building rises to a height of 190 metres (623 feet). It was designed by Zaha Hadid Architects. The site at 2 Murray Road was reportedly the world's most expensive plot, worth US$3 billion, when it was purchased by developer Henderson Land Development in 2017, leading to the demolition of the car park at the site. Construction began in 2019 and was completed in 2024.

The Henderson's occupancy rate reached 90% as of January 2026, with multinational companies and financial institutions among its notable tenants, including: global alternative investment firm Point72; secondary private assets market investor Coller Capital; global growth equity firm General Atlantic; hedge fund firm Aeonea; investment management company Cohen & Steers; law firm Akin Gump Strauss Hauer & Feld LLP; Japanese law firm Nishimura & Asahi; luxury watchmaker Audemars Piguet; and art and luxury auction house Christie's.

== History ==
The Murray Road Project was named "The Henderson" by Henderson Land. At the time of its purchase in 2017, the site had attained a record for the highest value of land in the world. This super Grade-A office tower covers 465,000 square feet.

== Design ==
Crowned with the prestigious “World’s Best Property” at the International Property Awards, The building was designed by Zaha Hadid Architects, and is characterized by its curved silhouette. The design was inspired by the form of a Bauhinia bud in full bloom. Its glass façade incorporates contemporary engineering techniques and aims to combine sustainability with technological functionality.

The Henderson has received numerous awards and accolades, including the 2025 CTBUH Awards - Overall Category Winner (Best Tall Building, by Region, Asia & Façade Award) and Award of Excellence Winner (Best Tall Building by Height, 100–199 meters & Space Within Award), Quality Building Award 2024 (Grand Award and The Innovative Project Award), HKIA Medal of the Year of Hong Kong 2024, and Green Building Award 2021 (Grand Award), etc. In addition, all three of The Henderson’s restaurants—Akira Back, Hana no Kumo, and Peridot—have been recognized on the Prix Versailles 2026 World’s Most Beautiful Restaurants List.

== Sustainability ==
The development holds 10 local and international accreditations across various sustainability and smart technology standards. These include LEED, BEAM Plus, WELL, the China Green Building Design Label, the China Healthy Building Design Label, WiredScore, SmartScore, ActiveScore, ModeScore and an "Outstanding" designation from the China Smart Building Certification.

== Art ==
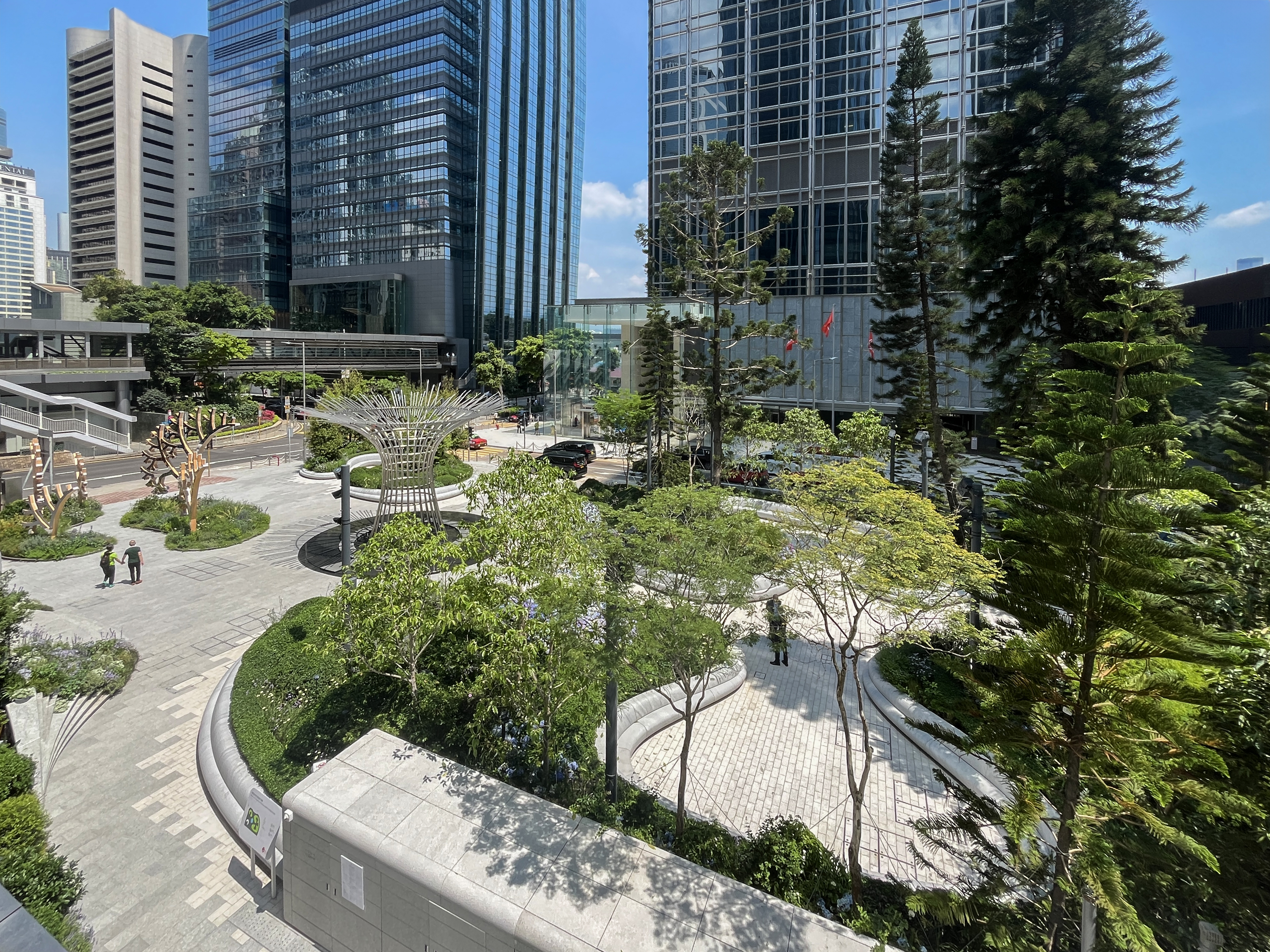
Lambeth Walk Rest Garden

The Henderson's curated collection of works is placed throughout the building and The Art Garden, integrating art and culture into the fabric of its design. Through a network of world-renowned partners, The Henderson invites the public to embrace art and reconnect with nature.

== Tenants ==
The Henderson's first anchor tenant, Christie's, occupies four office floors totaling approximately 50,000 square feet. The establishment of their Asian Pacific Headquarters, first year-round saleroom and gallery space, at The Henderson provides Christie’s with the flexibility to transition from a biannual sales and events schedule to year-round programming, enabling greater opportunities for creativity and innovation.

The Carlyle Group and its subsidiaries Carlyle AlpInvest, occupy approximately 20,000 square feet of office space at The Henderson. Henderson Land and Carlyle share a common vision of fostering a smart and sustainable future, as well as a commitment to driving positive change and creating long-term value for stakeholders.

The Swiss fine watchmaking manufacturer Audemars Piguet occupies an entire floor of about 12,000 square feet at The Henderson, housing the brand’s iconic AP House alongside its Hong Kong office.

The Henderson's tenant portfolio also includes internationally recognized firms such as Point72, CPP Investments, Coller Capital, spanning various industries and contributing to its reputation as a premier business destination in Hong Kong.

The Henderson is the first commercial building in APAC to partner with Forbes Travel Guide on Five-Star Guest Experience Standards.

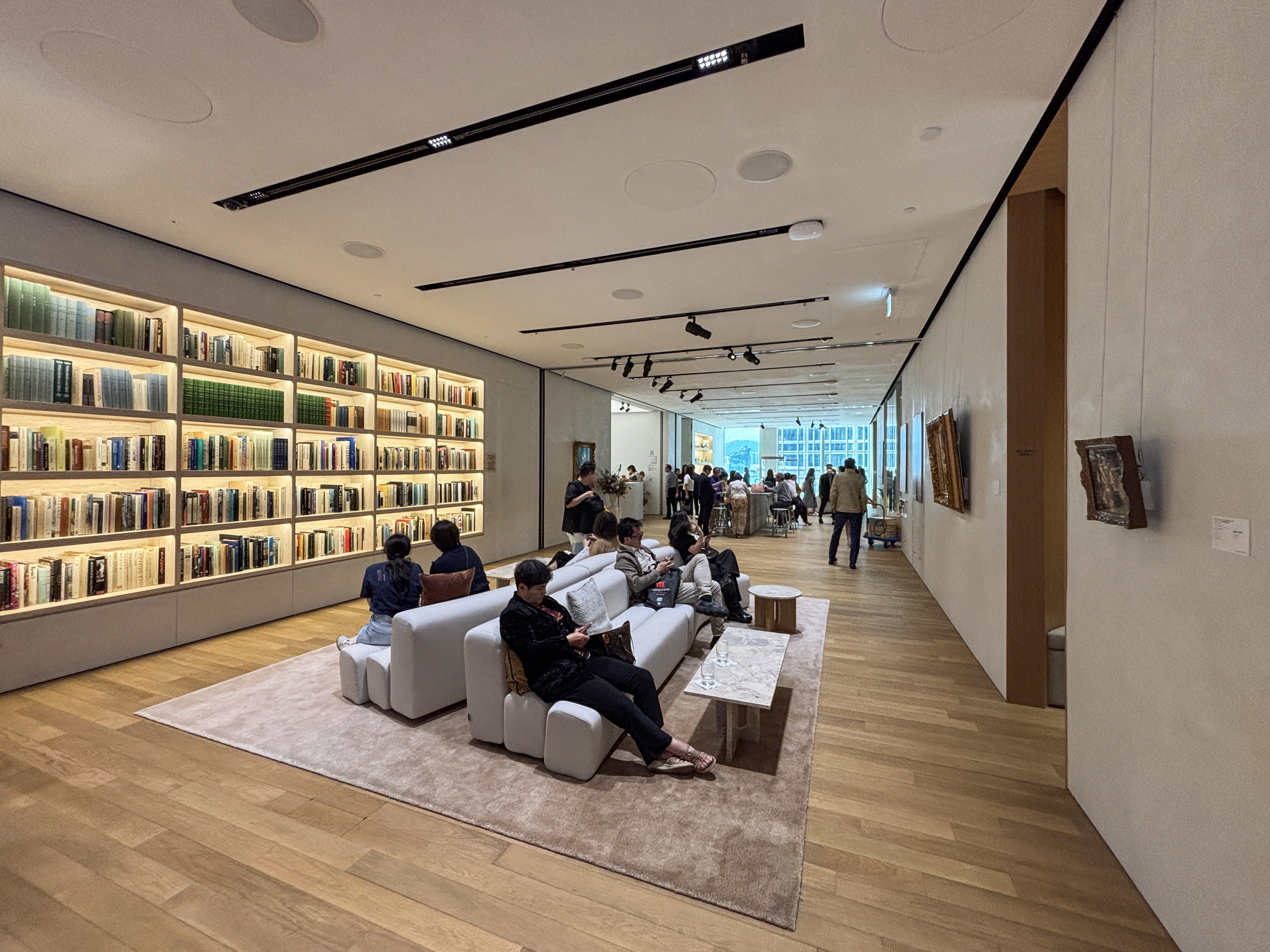
Christie's Hong Kong Private Lounge

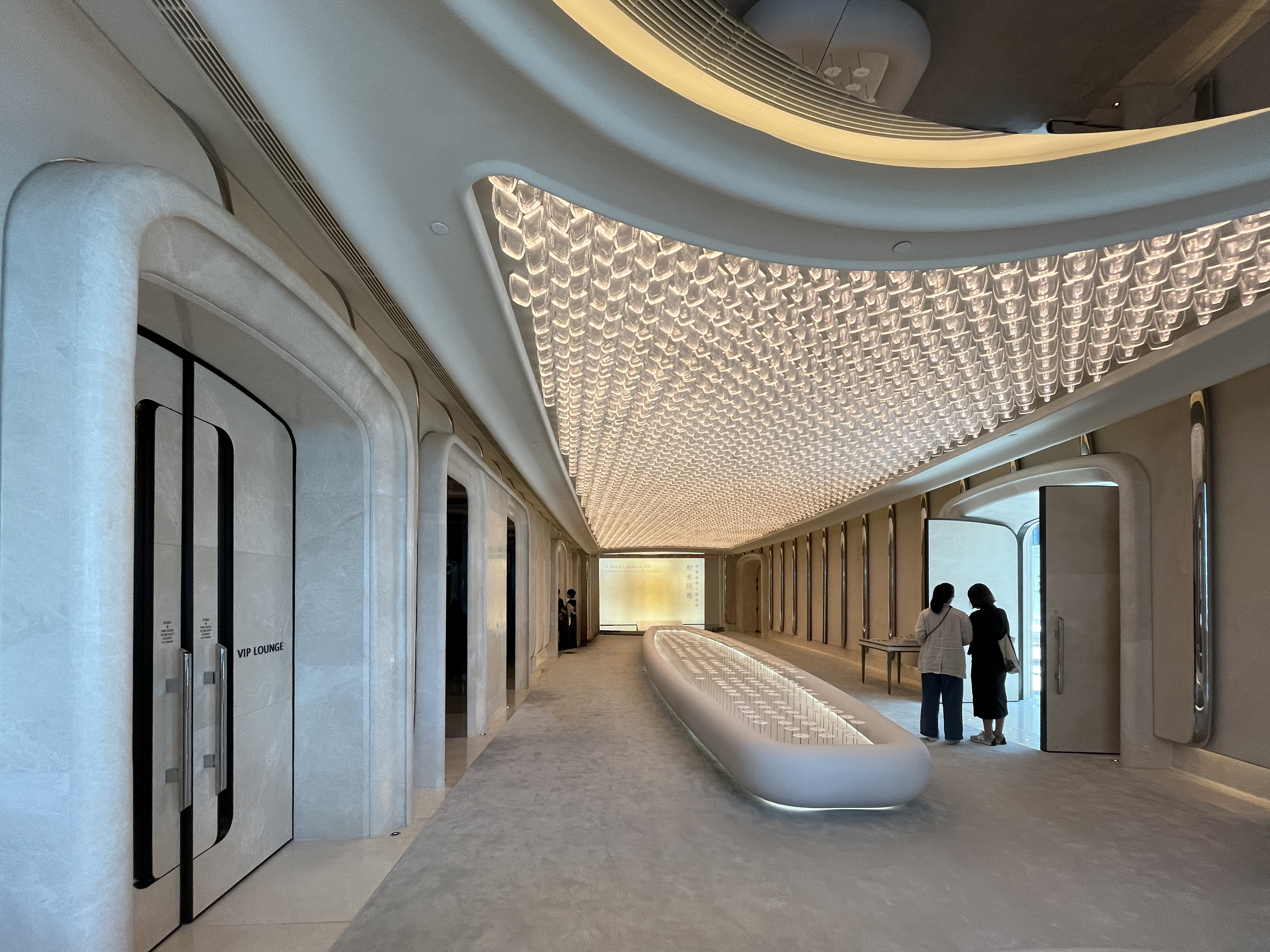
Cloud 39 Foyer

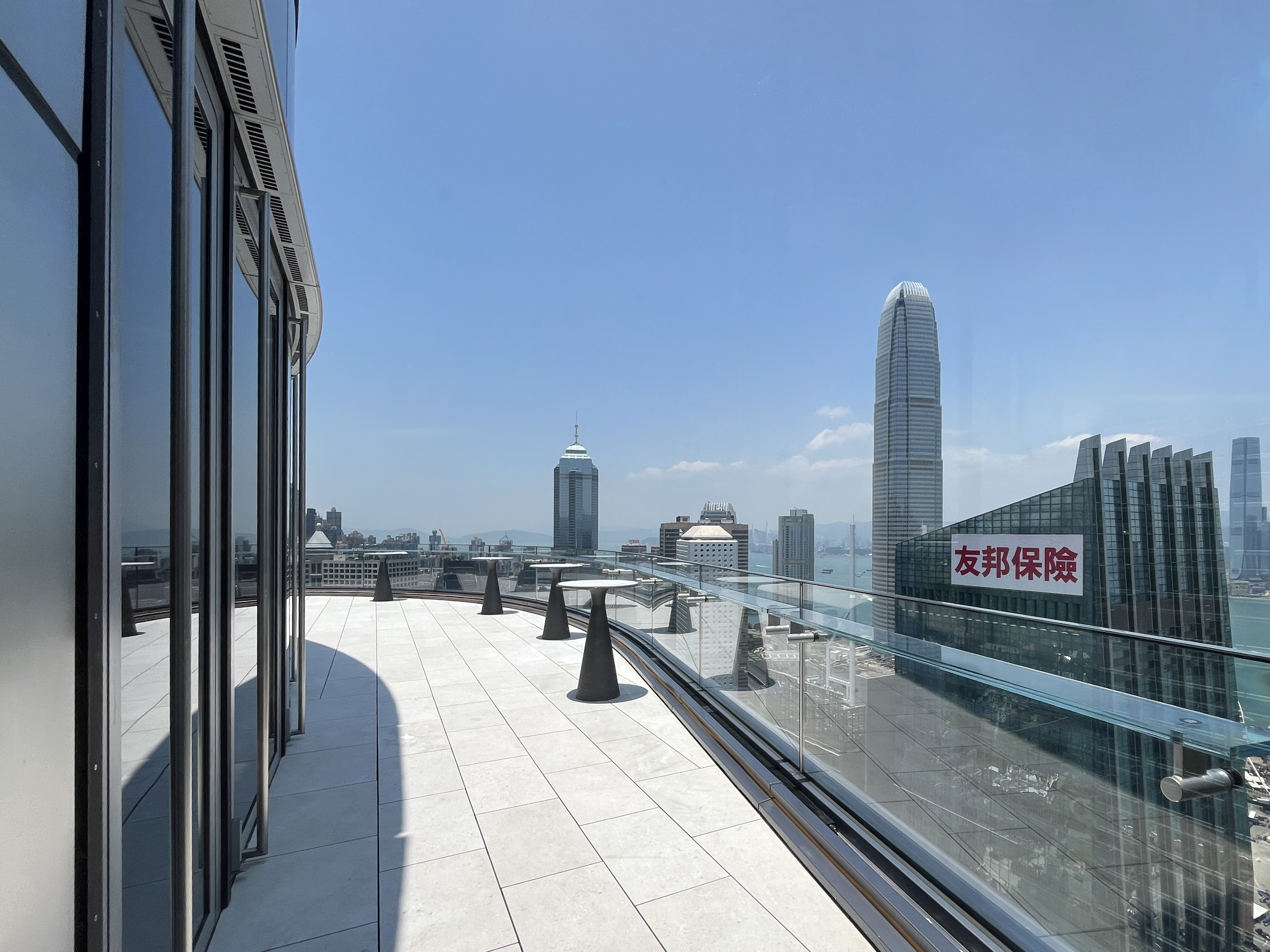
Cloud 39 Foyer balcony

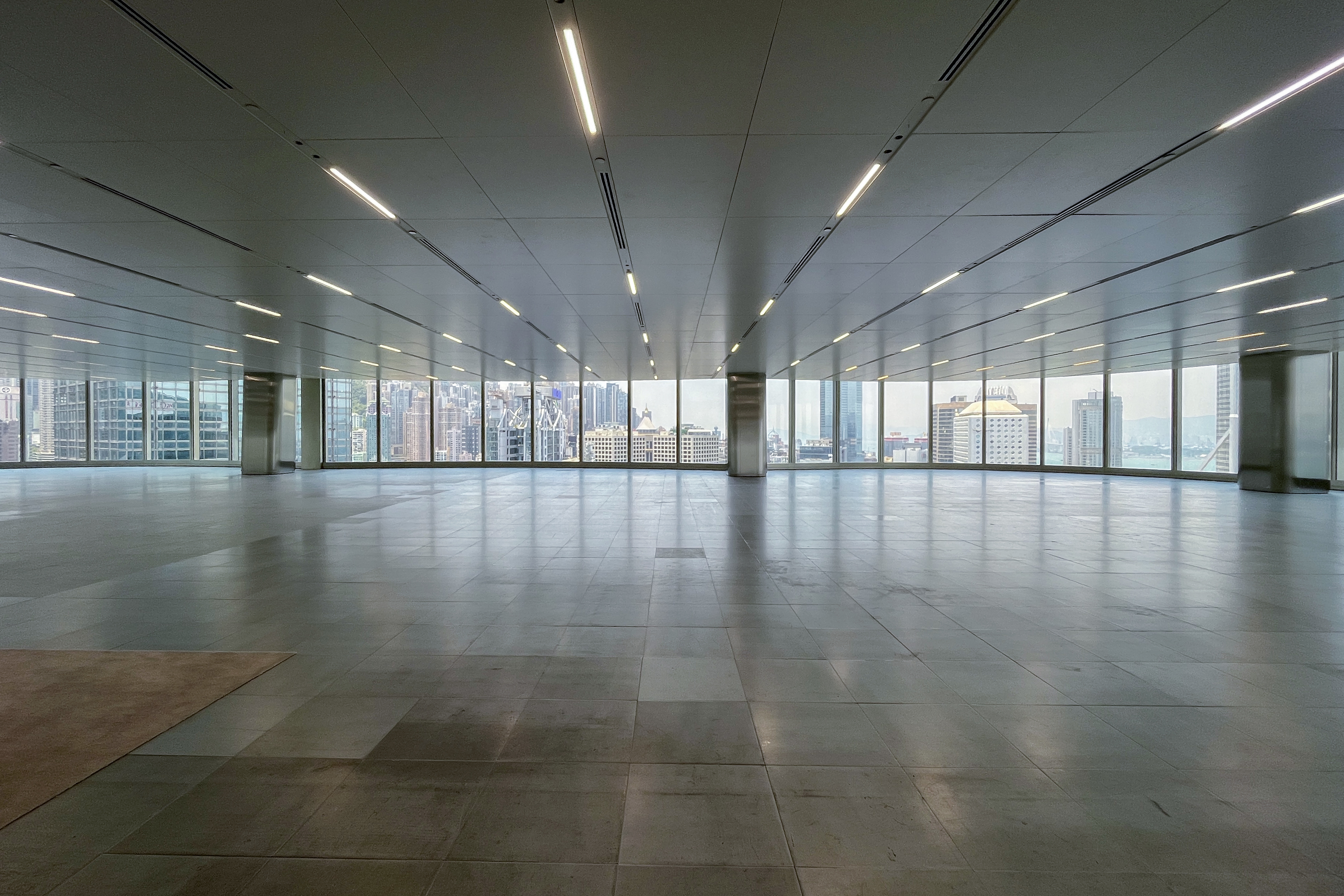
Vacant office in 36/F
