= Murray Road Multi-storey Car Park Building =

Building in Admiralty, Hong Kong

Coordinates: 22.280178°N 114.162136°E

- Traditional Chinese: 美利道多層停車場大廈
- Simplified Chinese: 美利道多层停车场大厦
Transcriptions
Standard Mandarin
- Hanyu Pinyin: Měilì Dào Duōcéng Tíngchēchǎng Dàshà
Yue: Cantonese
- Jyutping: mei5 lei6 dou6 do1 cang4 ting4 ce1 coeng4 daai6 haa6

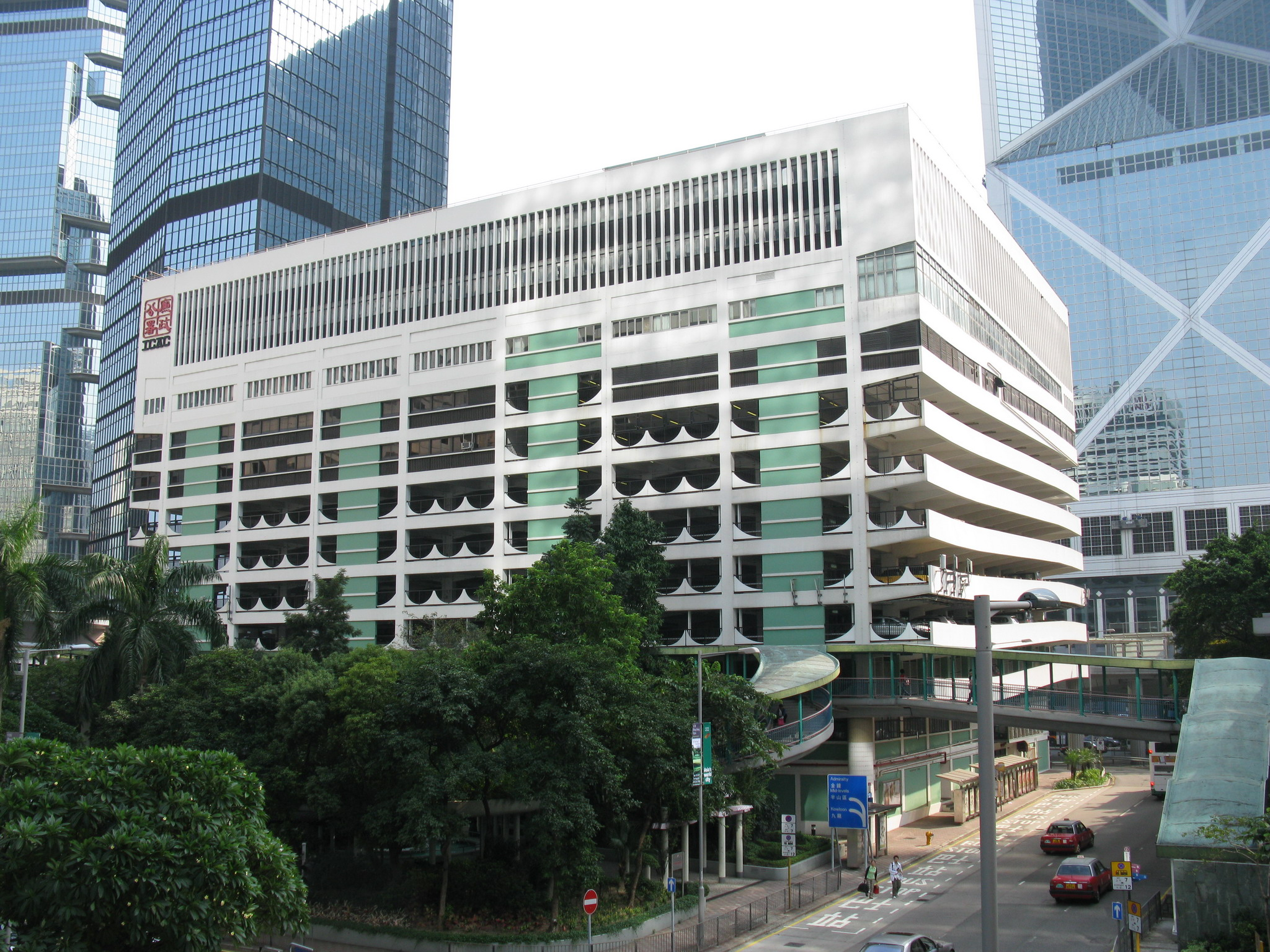
Murray Road Multi-storey Car Park Building along Murray Road, in 2007.

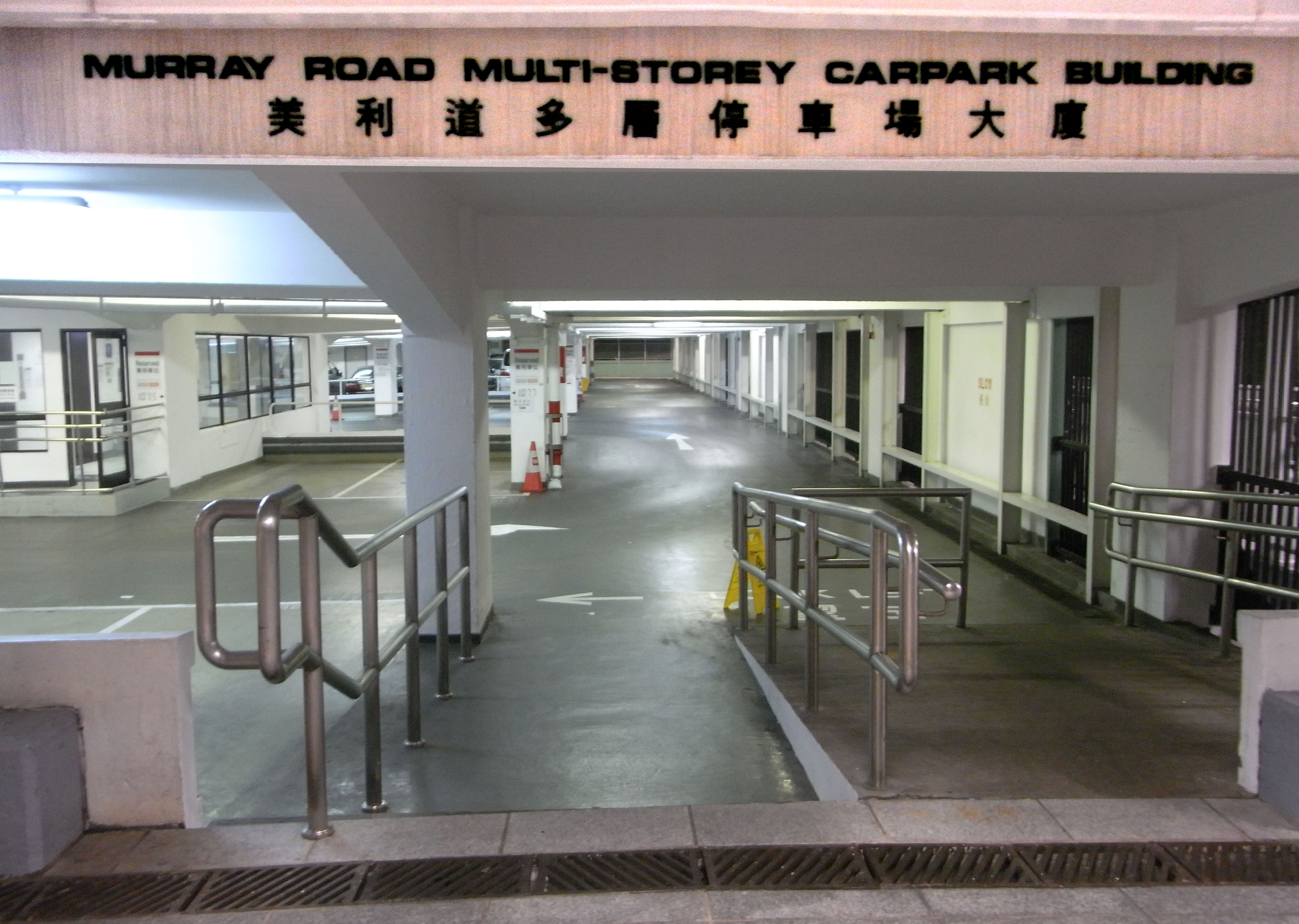
Murray Road Multi-storey Car Park Building interior

The Murray Road Multi-storey Car Park Building (Chinese: 美利道多層停車場大廈) was a building mostly occupied by a public multi-storey car park in Central, Hong Kong. Built in 1973, the building was sold in 2017 and the land plot is now the site of The Henderson office building. The building was located along Murray Road, after which it was named. Murray Road was named after Sir George Murray, a soldier and politician from Scotland.

== History ==
Construction on the building began in 1972. The car park opened for public use on 30 July 1973. The headquarters of the Transport Department relocated to the building in 1974.

The Operations Department of the Independent Commission Against Corruption was located in the top floors of the Murray Road Multi-storey Car Park Building from 1978 to 2007. A radio mast was erected on the rooftop in 1978 as part of a new HK$418,000 radio network facilitating communication with ICAC investigators.

In 1979–1980, an elevated walkway was built between the car park building and Queensway Plaza (the shopping centre above Admiralty station).

In the 1990s, the Hong Kong Government Archives were located on the mezzanine floor of the Murray Road Multi-storey Car Park Building. Later in the decade, they were transferred to the Sun Yik factory building in Tuen Mun.

The City Gallery, an exhibition centre about the planning and development of urban areas in Hong Kong, was temporarily located within Murray Road Multi-storey Car Park from 2009 to 2012.

In 2017, Henderson Land Development bid successfully to acquire the government-owned commercial plot on which the car park was built. Henderson Land would pay HK$23.28 billion (US$3 billion) for the plot.

The Murray Road Multi-storey Car Park ceased operation at midnight on 30 April 2017. By the time of its closure, the car park was providing 388 public parking spaces for private cars and 55 for motorcycles.

After official closure, the car park reopened for a few months in late 2017. In January 2018, it was closed again. Demolition started in March and was completed in May that year.

== See also ==
- Tsuen Wan Transport Complex
- Yau Ma Tei Car Park Building
