= Murray Road =

Road in Central, Hong Kong

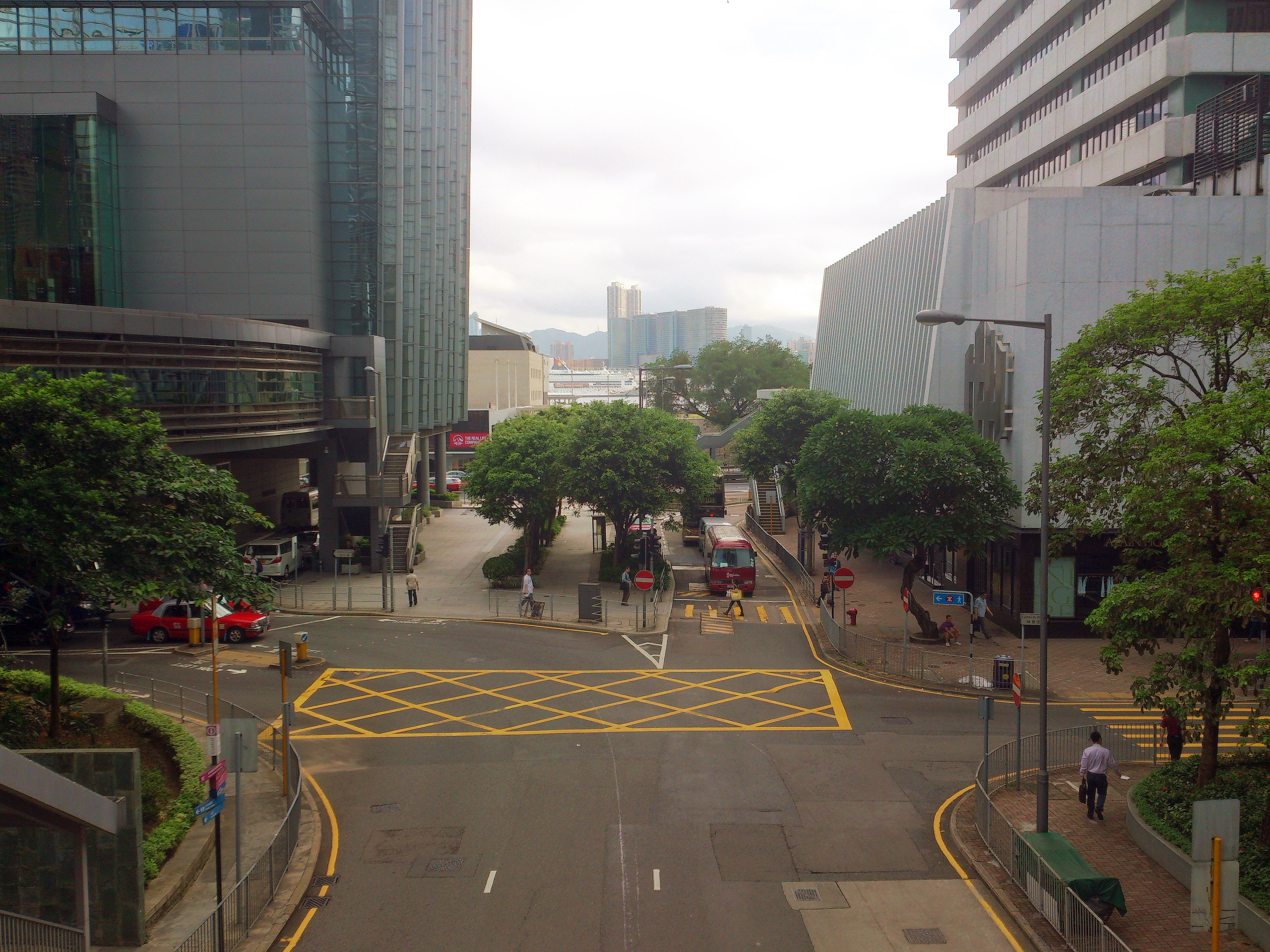
Murray Road near Chater Road with Tsim Sha Tsui in the distance

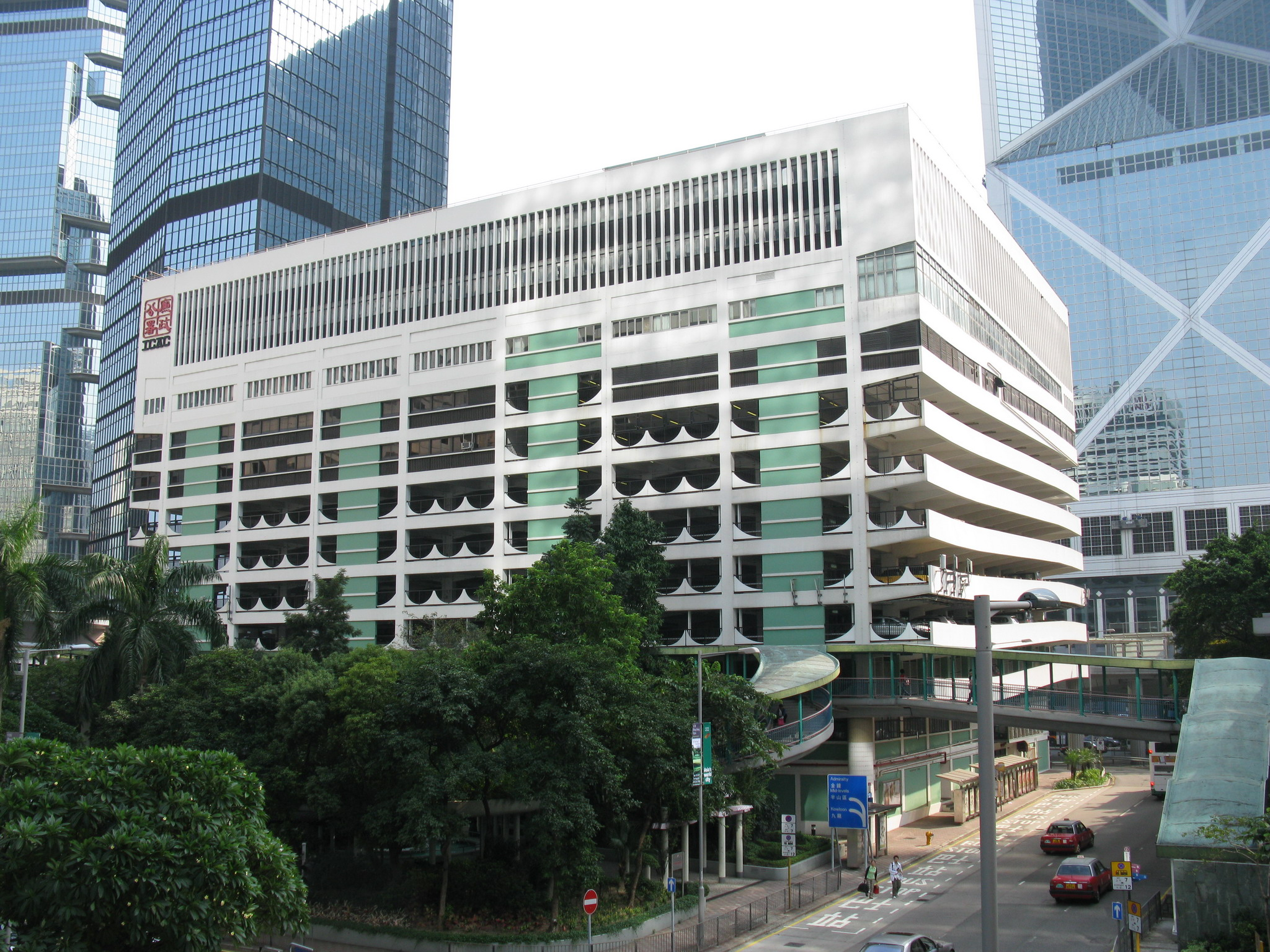
The former Murray Road Multi-storey Car Park Building along Murray Road in 2007.

Murray Road (Chinese: 美利道) is a road in Hong Kong. It is sometimes considered a boundary between Admiralty and Central. Along with a few other places in the area, it was named after Sir George Murray, a soldier and politician from Scotland.

== Notable buildings and places along the road ==
- Chater Garden
- AIA Central (formerly Furama Kempinski Hotel)
- Edinburgh Place
- Murray Road Multi-storey Car Park Building (demolished)
- The Henderson

== See also ==
- List of streets and roads in Hong Kong
- Murray House
- Murray Battery
- Murray Barracks
