= Transport Department =

Hong Kong government department

- 運輸署

Agency overview
- Formed: 1 December 1968; 57 years ago
- Headquarters: South Tower, West Kowloon Government Offices 11 Hoi Ting Road Yau Ma Tei, Kowloon
- Employees: 1,903 (2022)
- Annual budget: HK$17,044.4m (2023-2024)
- Agency executives: Angela Lee, Commissioner for Transport; Candy Kwok, Deputy Commissioner for Transport Services and Management; Patrick Ho, Deputy Commissioner for Planning and Technical Services
- Parent agency: Transport and Logistics Bureau
- Website: www.td.gov.hk

Transport Department
- Traditional Chinese: 運輸署
- Simplified Chinese: 运输署
Transcriptions
Standard Mandarin
- Hanyu Pinyin: Yùnshū Shǔ
Yue: Cantonese
- Jyutping: wan6 syu1 cyu5

The Transport Department is a government agency under the Transport and Logistics Bureau of the Government of Hong Kong. It is responsible for transportation-related policy in Hong Kong.

The Transport Department was created on 1 December 1968 as a separate department within the Hong Kong Government. Prior to 1968 it was assigned to the Transport Office under the Colonial Secretary's department.

== History ==
The Transport Office was founded in 1965 within the Colonial Secretariat, initially with a staff of 23. The office was set up in response to the territory's worsening traffic problems, and was modelled after the systems in Britain and other Commonwealth countries, with the new department taking responsibility for vehicle registration and driver licensing. In 1968, it was spun off as a separate government department, and was renamed as the Transport Department.

In 1974, the department's headquarters moved from the Blake Block on Queensway to the new Murray Road Multi-storey Car Park Building. Around the same time, the department's Chinese name changed from "交通事務處" to "運輸署" to avoid confusion with the similar Chinese name of the Traffic Branch of the Royal Hong Kong Police.

The department's role expanded significantly in April 1982, when it absorbed the Traffic and Transport Branch of the Highways Office of the former Public Works Department. Units that moved to the Transport Department at this time were responsible for traffic engineering, traffic control and surveillance, road safety, and traffic surveys.

In 2019, the Transport Department headquarters moved from Immigration Tower to the new West Kowloon Government Offices in Yau Ma Tei.

In November 2020, it was reported that in 2019, the Transport Department changed one option of vehicle license plate searches from "others" to "other traffic and transport related matters," eliminating the ability of reporters to conduct license plate searches. Because of the change, RTHK reporter Bao Choy was charged with violating the Road Traffic Ordinance while producing a documentary on the 2019 Yuen Long attacks. In April 2021, Bao was found guilty, and in response, the Journalists Association said that press freedom was being undermined, stating "Today will be remembered and must be remembered in history... a reporter in Hong Kong who conducted vehicle searches to find out more about the Yuen Long attacks demonstrated the role of the media as a watchdog. The relentless effort of the journalist to find out the whole truth of the Yuen Long attack ... this is what the fourth power is about."

In January 2021, the Transportation Department announced a change to the system, where vehicle owners will be notified if their license plate is looked up. Journalists had previously used the tool for investigations, including to discover illegal structures at homes of senior government officials. In response, Carrie Lam defended the change, and claimed that "So I really don't see how this would undermine the work of the media, and hence I do not see why the media should be exempted from the administrative procedure that the Transport Department has put in place."

== Role and responsibilities ==
- registration of vehicles in Hong Kong
- licensing of rail and bus operators in Hong Kong
- licensing offices
- all roads within Hong Kong
- co-ownership of bridges and tunnels (mainly a public-private mix)
- 18,000 on-street metered parking spaces
- traffic management
- transport planning

== Leadership ==
The post of Commissioner for Transport (署長) is currently held by Angela Lee Chung-yan. The Commissioner reports to the Secretary for Transport and Housing.

List of commissioners:

- Brian D. Wilson (惠柳新) (1972–1974)
- Ian Macpherson (麥法誠) (1974–1978)
- Alan Thomas Armstrong-Wright (顏敦禮) (1978–1982)
- Peter F. Leeds (李舒) (1982–1987)
- James So Yiu-cho (蘇燿祖) (1987–1989)
- Gordon Siu (蕭炯柱) (1989–1992)
- Rafael Hui Si-yan (許仕仁) (1992–1995)
- Lily Yam Kwan Pui-ying (任關佩英) (1995–1997)
- Fanny Law Fan Chiu-fun (羅范椒芬) (1997–1998)
- Robert Charles Law Footman (霍文) (1998–2005)
- Alan Wong Chi-kong (黃志光) (2005–2009)
- Joseph Lai (黎以德) (2009–2012)
- Susie Ho Shuk-yee (何淑兒) (July 2012 – October 2012)
- Ingrid Yeung (楊何蓓茵) (October 2012 – October 2017)
- Mable Chan (陳美寶) (October 2017 – September 2020)
- Rosanna Law (羅淑佩) (September 2020 - August 2023)
- Angela Lee Chung-yan (August 2023 - present)

== See also ==
- Driving licence in Hong Kong
- Hong Kong Strategic Route and Exit Number System
- Transport in Hong Kong
- List of tunnels and bridges in Hong Kong
- MTR Corporation
- MTR
