= Murray Battery =

- 美利炮台
- Hong Kong
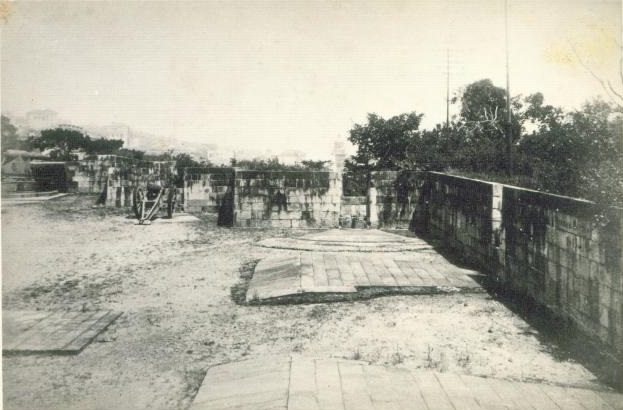
- Murray Battery in 1897

Site information
- Type: Gun battery

Location
- Location within Hong Kong
- Coordinates: 22.279°N 114.158°E

Site history
- Built: 1841
- Built for: War Office
- In use: 1841-1950

Murray Battery
- Traditional Chinese: 美利炮台
Transcriptions
Yue: Cantonese
- Yale Romanization: Méih leih paau tòih
- Jyutping: Mei5 lei6 paau3 toi4

Murray Battery was an artillery battery located on Battery Path, beneath Government Hill in Central, Hong Kong. Named after Sir George Murray, it was built in 1841, shortly after the British took possession of Hong Kong, and served to protect the colonial government's headquarters. It was demolished in the 1950s and replaced with the Former Central Government Offices.

== History ==
During the First Opium War, the British occupied Hong Kong in 1841 and one year later, the territory was ceded to them in the Treaty of Nanking. The new administration chose the site around Battery Path to build its headquarters and defences. The coastal fortification consisted of five coastal artillery positions that overlooked and guarded Victoria Harbour in 1882 (however, due to land reclamation, the site is no longer situated on the coastline). These were removed in the late 19th century, due to the military's relocation and development of artillery batteries in more obscure and outlying areas in Hong Kong Island—namely the Lei Yue Mun Fort built in 1887. Prior to 1856, Murray Battery also marked the limits of the city's street lighting; all roads east of the battery were not illuminated.

However, the site of the battery still existed until the 1950s, when the colonial government decided to redevelop the area in order to build a new headquarters building that would consolidate all government departments in one place. As a result, the battery was demolished and the new (now former) Central Government Offices (CGO) was built in its place, with construction being completed in 1959. The West Wing of the CGO now occupies the site of the battery. Today, a replica cannon located near the CGO pays tribute to Murray's Battery.

== See also ==
- Battery Path
- Murray Barracks and Murray House
