= Legislative Council Complex =

Hong Kong legislative building

Coordinates: 22°16′50.85″N 114°9′56.08″E

- 立法會綜合大樓
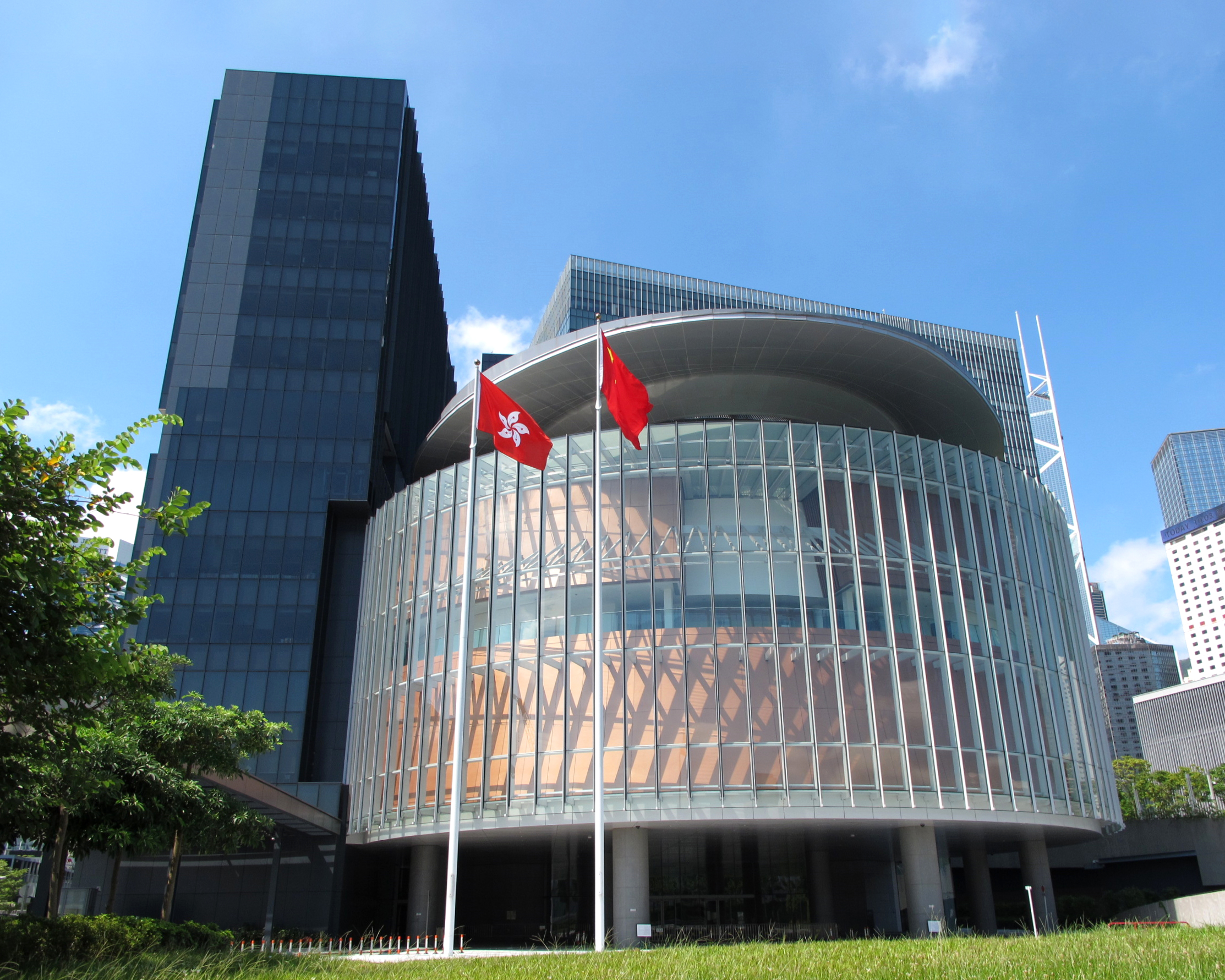
- Legislative Council Complex in 2011
- Interactive map of the Legislative Council Complex area

General information
- Status: Completed
- Type: Legislature
- Architectural style: Mix of postmodern architecture and low-frills international design
- Location: 1 Legislative Council Road, Central, Hong Kong
- Construction started: February 2008; 18 years ago
- Completed: September 2011; 14 years ago
- Opening: 12 October 2011; 14 years ago
- Cost: HK$4.94 billion (whole Tamar Development Project)
- Owner: Legislative Council

Height
- Top floor: 33.3 m (109 ft) (Council Block); 57.5 m (189 ft) (Office Block)

Technical details
- Floor count: 5 (Council Block); 11 (Office Block)
- Floor area: 38,905m²

Design and construction
- Main contractor: Gammon Construction and Hip Hing Construction

Website
- www.legco.gov.hk

Legislative Council Complex
- Traditional Chinese: 立法會綜合大樓
- Simplified Chinese: 立法会综合大楼
Transcriptions
Standard Mandarin
- Hanyu Pinyin: Lìfǎhuì Zōnghé Dàlóu
Yue: Cantonese
- Yale Romanization: Lahp faat wuih jung hahp daaih làuh
- Jyutping: Lap6 faat3 wui6*2 zung3 hap6 daai6 lau4

The Legislative Council Complex (LegCo Complex) is the seat of the Legislative Council of Hong Kong. The complex plays a central role in the legislative process of the Hong Kong Special Administrative Region (SAR), and it has been a focal point for political events and public demonstrations.

The complex is located at 1 Legislative Council Road, Central, Hong Kong and forms part of the Central Government Complex. It sits facing Victoria Harbour. Officially opened in September 2011, it was the first purpose-built building for the Hong Kong legislature, replacing the former Supreme Court Building.

== History ==
Before the construction of the current complex, the Legislative Council of Hong Kong met in various locations. These included the Former French Mission Building (1843–1846), Caine Road (1846–1855), Government House, Hong Kong (1855; used ballroom after 1891), Old Central Government Offices (1930s–1954), and the Former Central Government Offices 1957–1985. The most notable was the Old Supreme Court Building, which was used from 1985 until the new complex was ready in 2011. This period was marked by significant political changes, including Hong Kong's transfer of sovereignty from the United Kingdom to China in 1997.

The idea for the new complex originated as part of the Tamar Development Project, a major initiative by the government of Hong Kong to provide new space for its headquarters and legislative council. The project was named after the Tamar site, a prime waterfront area in Central Hong Kong, which was earmarked for the development. This project was seen as a symbol of Hong Kong's post-1997 identity, aiming to consolidate various governmental functions in a single, modern location.

The planning for the Legislative Council Complex began in the early 2000s. Construction of the Legislative Council Complex began in 2008. The project faced various challenges, including public debates over its cost and environmental impact.

=== 2019 anti-extradition bill protests ===
As part of protests against the 2019 Hong Kong extradition bill on 1 July 2019, a smaller, more-radical group of protesters from the day's march against the central government, angered by the previous crackdowns of peaceful protests by the police and from the lack of a total withdrawal of the bill, gathered around the Legislative Council Complex and, after the police withdrew from the site, stormed the building, using improvised battering rams to break through the glass into the lobby of the building. The protesters gained entrance to the Legislative Council chambers and defaced the walls and symbols of the council with graffiti, some calling out against the SAR and mainland governments, and some against the Hong Kong Police Force. The police regained control of the Legco site by midnight, where by then, most protesters had left the site peacefully. The estimated cost of the damage to the site was HK$10 million, though protesters took care not to damage historical artefacts or the libraries.

=== Expansion ===
In response to the 2021 Hong Kong electoral reform by the Chinese Communist Party (CCP), which reduced the number of publicly elected Legislative Council (LegCo) seats and added 40 more seats chosen by a small-circle Election Committee, LegCo expanded from 70 to 90 members. This necessitated the expansion of the LegCo Complex, a plan which was approved by lawmakers on 10 May 2021.

The expansion project, however, has encountered significant cost overruns and technical challenges. Originally estimated to cost around HK$1.17 billion, the project now requires an additional HK$391.2 million, raising the total to approximately HK$1.56 billion.

As of January 2024, the project is underway with the additional floors on top of the High Block and Office Block largely complete. Interior fittings and installations are also in progress. A second phase, expected to last nine months until March 2026, will involve conversion works to the existing building.

== Design ==
The LegCo Complex is composed of the Council Block and the Office Block. Adjoining the Complex are LegCo Garden and LegCo Square. The Complex provides office and conference facilities for staff, visitors, and members of the press.

=== Architecture ===
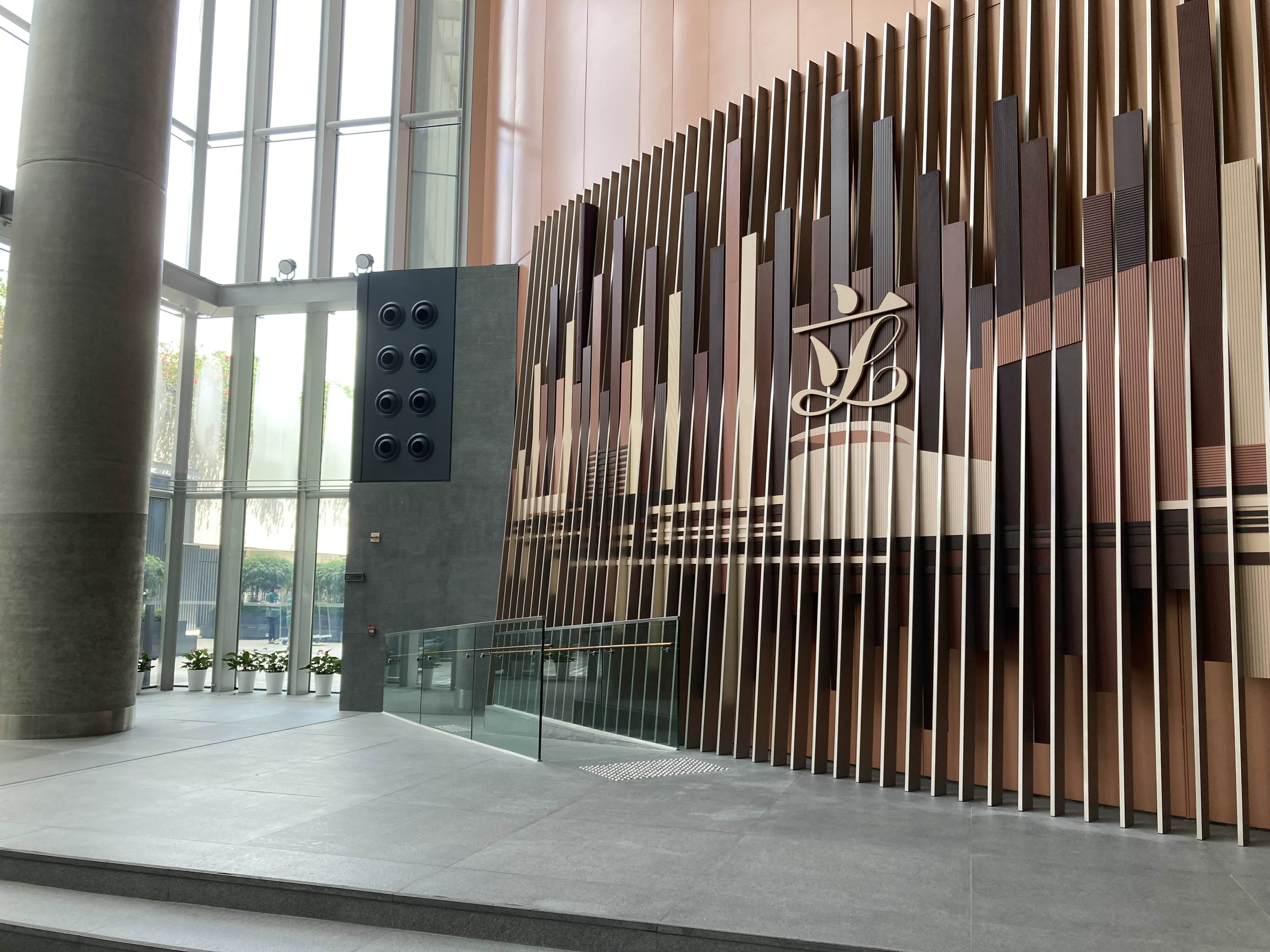
Lobby of the Legislative Council

The LegCo Complex demonstrates a strong emphasis on the vertical lines and features as the integrative design element. The interior design theme of the LegCo Complex integrates both elements of solemnity and prudence, and of openness and empathy, as symbolically represented by "square" (which denotes restraints) and "round" (which denotes changes) shapes used strategically in the interior design of the various lobby halls and conference rooms.

=== Sustainability ===
The LegCo Complex is designed with a unique natural light funnel in the chamber. This architectural feature allows natural light to permeate the legislative chamber. The complex also boasts a green roof and a sky garden, integrating eco-friendly design elements into its structure. These green spaces not only contribute to the aesthetic appeal of the building but also play a role in energy conservation and environmental sustainability. A lily pond is incorporated into the complex's landscape which provides a cooling effect.

The complex features a double-layered ventilated facade design. This architectural element contributes to the building's energy efficiency by regulating temperature and reducing the need for artificial cooling and heating. It also adds an aesthetic dimension to the building's exterior.

=== Accessibility ===
Automatic sliding or swing doors and tactile paths are installed at all main entrances and public areas, ensuring accessibility for individuals with mobility or visual impairments. Internal doors in public and common areas are designed to provide unobstructed space, facilitating easy movement for everyone, including those using wheelchairs. The complex also has special toilets for those with disabilities available on every floor where the cubicles are specifically enlarged to allow for easier maneuvers.

Wireless microphones and earphones are installed in certain meeting rooms to assist those with hearing impairments. Additionally, audio sign systems or touch-activated audio signs are installed at key locations accessible to the public, aiding individuals with visual impairments.

=== Art ===
In 2009, the LegCo Complex initiated the Art Acquisition Project to enhance the aesthetic appeal of its premises. The LegCo encouraged a wide range of artistic expressions and media, without specifying a particular theme, to invite creativity and artistic freedom from the participants.

Selected artworks now displayed in the LegCo Complex include:

- "The People" by Cornelia Erdmann;
- "Re-vitalizing" by Mok Yat-sun and Man Fung-yi;
- "Mountains and Clouds" by Koo Mei;
- "Huayuan" by Simon Heijdens;
- "Reflections" by Cho Kwok-ting;
- "City Landscape Album" by Hung Hoi;
- "Promises, Persist as Time Changes, Exist as Space Limits" by Yeung Chung-nga;
- "Breaking Dawn" by Lee Lai-fan.

== Facilities ==
=== Conference facilities ===
Council meetings are held in 800 square metre The Chamber. There are also five conference rooms for members to hold open and closed committee meetings.

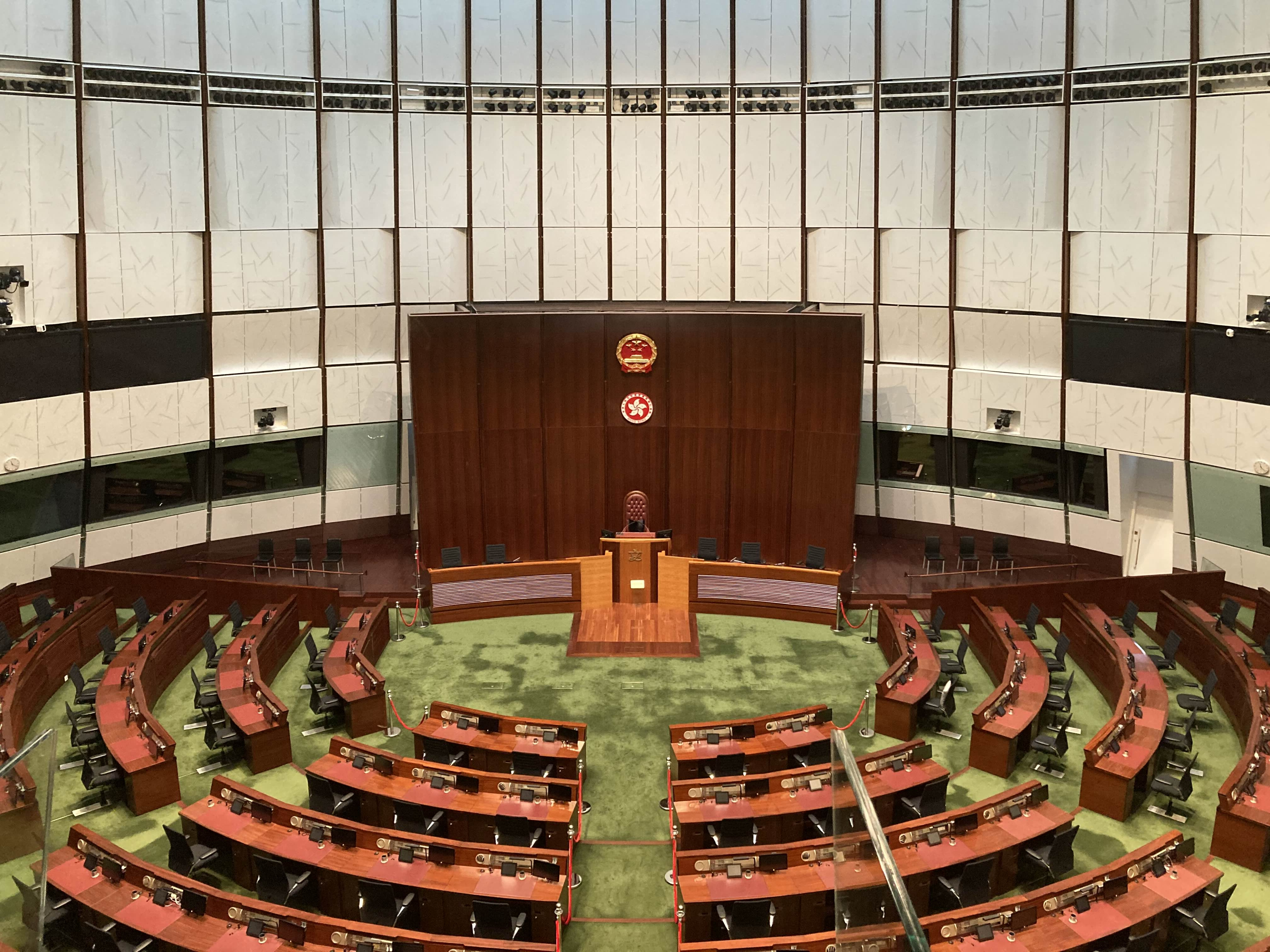
The Chamber of the Legislative Council

Public and press galleries are located at the upper level of the Chamber together with three conference rooms for the public and the press to observe proceedings of all Council meetings and open meetings of committees. All seats of the public and press galleries are equipped with headphones for simultaneous interpretation between Cantonese and English.

=== Media facilities ===
Media facilities for reporters to cover meetings and activities of the Council include a duplex press room, dedicated TV/radio rooms for electronic news media organisations, and larger photo rooms for photographers and camera crews.

=== Public facilities ===
The LegCo Complex incorporates a number of facilities open for visit by the public including a library, an archive, a series of education facilities such as a children's corner, a memory lane, a viewing gallery, an education activities room, and two education galleries.

== See also ==
- Central Government Complex
- Macau Legislative Assembly Building

Preceded by Old Supreme Court Building	Home of the Legislative Council of Hong Kong; 2011 – present	Succeeded by current
