= Legislative Council Building =

Legislative Council Building may refer to:

- Old Supreme Court Building, Hong Kong, the former seat (1985-2011) of the Legislative Council of Hong Kong and now the Court of Final Appeal Building
- Legislative Council Complex, location of the Legislative Council of Hong Kong since 2011

== See also ==
- Legislative council
