= List of public works ministries =

This list indicates government departments in various countries dedicated to public works or infrastructure.

| Country | Ministry | Head |
|---|---|---|
| Albania | Ministry of Public Works, Transportation and Telecommunications | |
| Algeria | Ministry of Public Works and Transportation | Minister of Public Works and Transportation |
| Argentina | Ministry of Public Works | Minister of Public Works |
| Australia | Department of Infrastructure and Transport; NSW Public Works; Queensland Department of Public Works; South Australia Department for Infrastructure and Transport; Public Works Department (Victoria); Public Works Department (Western Australia) | Minister for Infrastructure and Transport Victoria Minister for Public Works |
| Bangladesh | Ministry of Housing and Public Works (Public Works Department) | |
| Bahamas | Ministry of Public Works and Transport | |
| Brunei | Ministry of Development (Public Works Department) | |
| Cambodia | Ministry of Public Works and Transport | |
| Canada | Public Works and Government Services Canada; Manitoba Department of Infrastructure; New Brunswick Department of Public Works and Highways | Minister of Public Services and Procurement; Minister of Infrastructure |
| Chile | Ministry of Public Works | |
| Colombia | Ministry of Public Works | |
| Costa Rica | Ministry of Public Works and Transport | |
| Croatia | Ministry of Maritime Affairs, Transport and Infrastructure | |
| Eritrea | Ministry of National Development | |
| France | - | Minister of Public Works |
| Georgia | Ministry of Regional Development and Infrastructure | |
| Greece | Ministry of Infrastructure, Transport and Networks | |
| Guatemala | Ministry of Communications, Infrastructure, and Housing | |
| Hong Kong | Works Branch, Development Bureau formerly Public Works Department | Secretary for Development |
| Hungary | - | Minister of Public Works and Transport |
| India | Central Public Works Department; Karnataka Public Works Department; Kerala Public Works Department; Tamil Nadu Public Works Department; West Bengal Department of Public Works | Minister of Public Works |
| Indonesia | Ministry of Public Works and Housing | Minister of Public Works and People's Housing |
| Israel | Energy and Water Resources Ministry | |
| Iran | Ministry of Infrastructure | Minister of Infrastructure |
| Italy | Ministry of Infrastructure and Transport | Minister of Public Works |
| Jamaica | Ministry of Transport and Works | |
| Japan | Ministry of Land, Infrastructure, Transport and Tourism | Minister of Infrastructure |
| Laos | Ministry of Public Works and Transport | |
| Lebanon | Ministry of Public Works and Transport | |
| Malaysia | Ministry of Works | Minister of Works |
| Moldova | Ministry of Infrastructure and Regional Development | Minister of Infrastructure and Regional Development |
| Netherlands | Ministry of Infrastructure and the Environment | Minister of Infrastructure and the Environment |
| New Zealand | New Zealand Ministry of Works | Minister of Works |
| Pakistan | Pakistan Public Works Department | |
| Paraguay | Ministry of Public Works | |
| Philippines | Department of Public Works and Highways | Secretary of Public Works and Highways |
| Poland | Ministry of Infrastructure | Minister of Infrastructure |
| Portugal | Ministry of Public Works, Transport and Communications | |
| Rwanda | Ministry of Infrastructure | Minister of Infrastructure |
| Singapore | Ministry of National Development | |
| Somaliland | Ministry of Public Works and Housing | |
| South Africa | Department of Public Works; Western Cape Department of Transport and Public Works | Minister of Public Works |
| Spain | Ministry of Public Works and Transport | Minister of Public Works |
| Syria | Ministry of Public Works and Housing | Minister of Public Works and Housing |
| Tanzania | Ministry of Infrastructure Development | |
| Thailand | Ministry of Interior; Department of Public Works and Town & Country Planning | |
| Timor-Leste | Ministry of Public Works | Minister of Public Works |
| Turkey | Ministry of Transport and Infrastructure | |
| Ukraine | Ministry of Infrastructure | Minister of Infrastructure |
| United Kingdom | Ministry of Works | |
| United States | Los Angeles County Department of Public Works; Guam Department of Public Works | |
| Vietnam | Ho Chi Minh City Department of Transportation and Public Works | |
| Yemen | Ministry of Public Works and Urban Development | |
| Zimbabwe | Ministry of Public Works | |

== See also ==
- Public works
- Ministry or Board of Public Works, the imperial Chinese ministry overseeing public projects from the Tang dynasty to the Qing
- Ministry of Works (disambiguation)
