= Ministry of Works =

Ministry of Works may refer to:

- Ministry of Works (Bahrain), a government ministry overseeing public works
- Ministry of Works and Human Settlement (Bhutan)
- Ministry of Works (imperial China), between the Tang and Qing dynasties
- Ministry of Works (Malaysia)
- Ministry of Works (Tanzania), a government ministry overseeing public works
- Ministry of Works (United Kingdom) (1943–1962), a former ministry now divided between the Department of the Environment and the Property Services Agency

== See also ==
- Ministry of Public Works
- Ministry of Housing and Works (Pakistan)
- Pakistan Public Works Department
- Ministry of Works and Development of New Zealand
- Ministry of Works and Transport (disambiguation)
- Rivers State Ministry of Works
