= Murray Barracks =

Dismantled barracks in Hong Kong

- 美利兵房
- Hong Kong
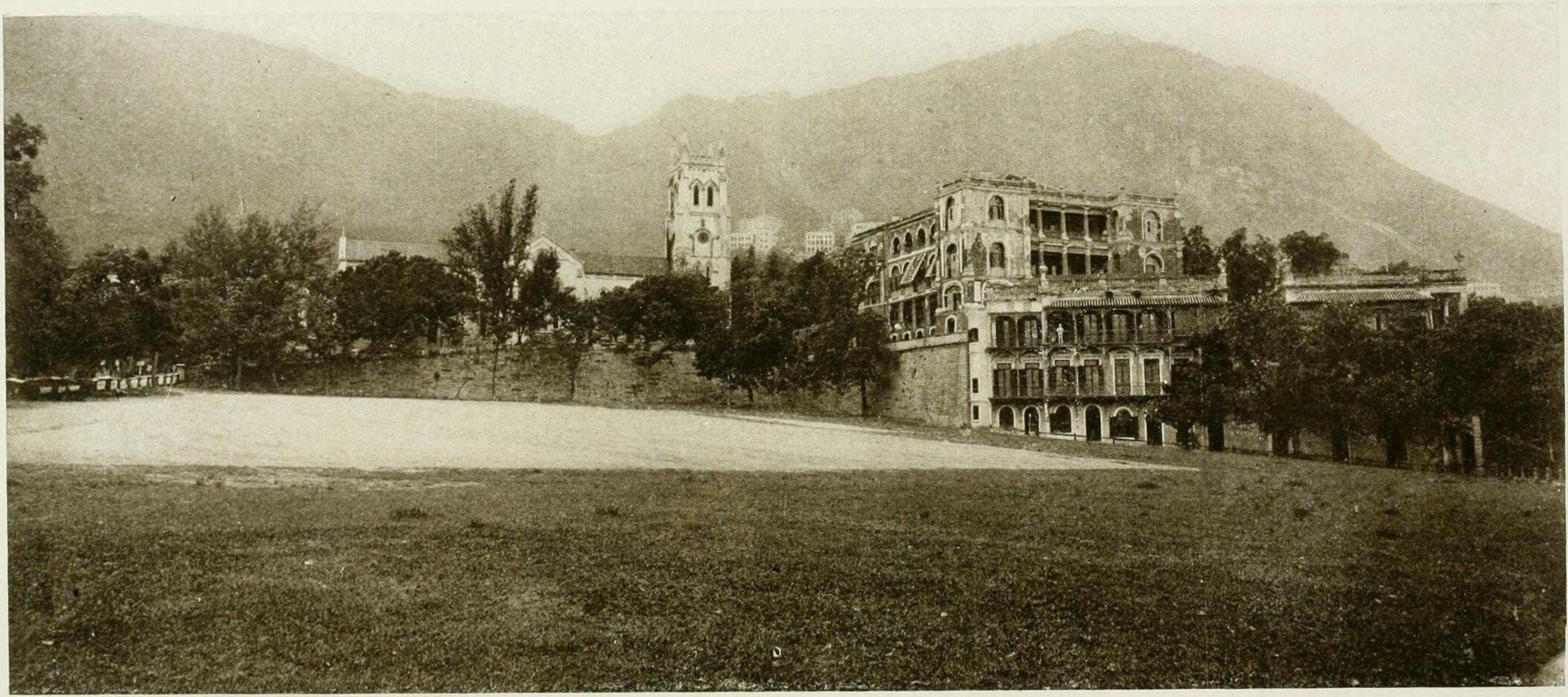
- Parade Ground (published 1907)

Site information
- Type: Barracks

Location
- Location within Hong Kong
- Coordinates: 22.278°N 114.161°E

Site history
- Built: circa 1850
- Built for: War Office
- In use: 1850–Present

Murray Barracks (Chinese: 美利兵房; Jyutping: mei5 lei6 bing1 fong4) was a barracks for the British Army garrisoned in Admiralty, Central in Hong Kong. It was named after Sir George Murray, the Master-General of the Ordnance at the time of construction.

== Location ==
It was situated between present Garden Road and Cotton Tree Drive. The Barracks was located at present Asia Pacific Centre and the Officer's Quarters, also known as Officer's Mess, was located at present Bank of China Tower, close to Queen's Road, (present-day Queensway). Across Garden Road was Murray Parade Ground (美利操場) and Queen's Road North Barracks, which was later known as Wellington Barracks.

Further west of the parade ground, behind Battery Path, stood the Murray Battery.

== Officer's Quarter ==
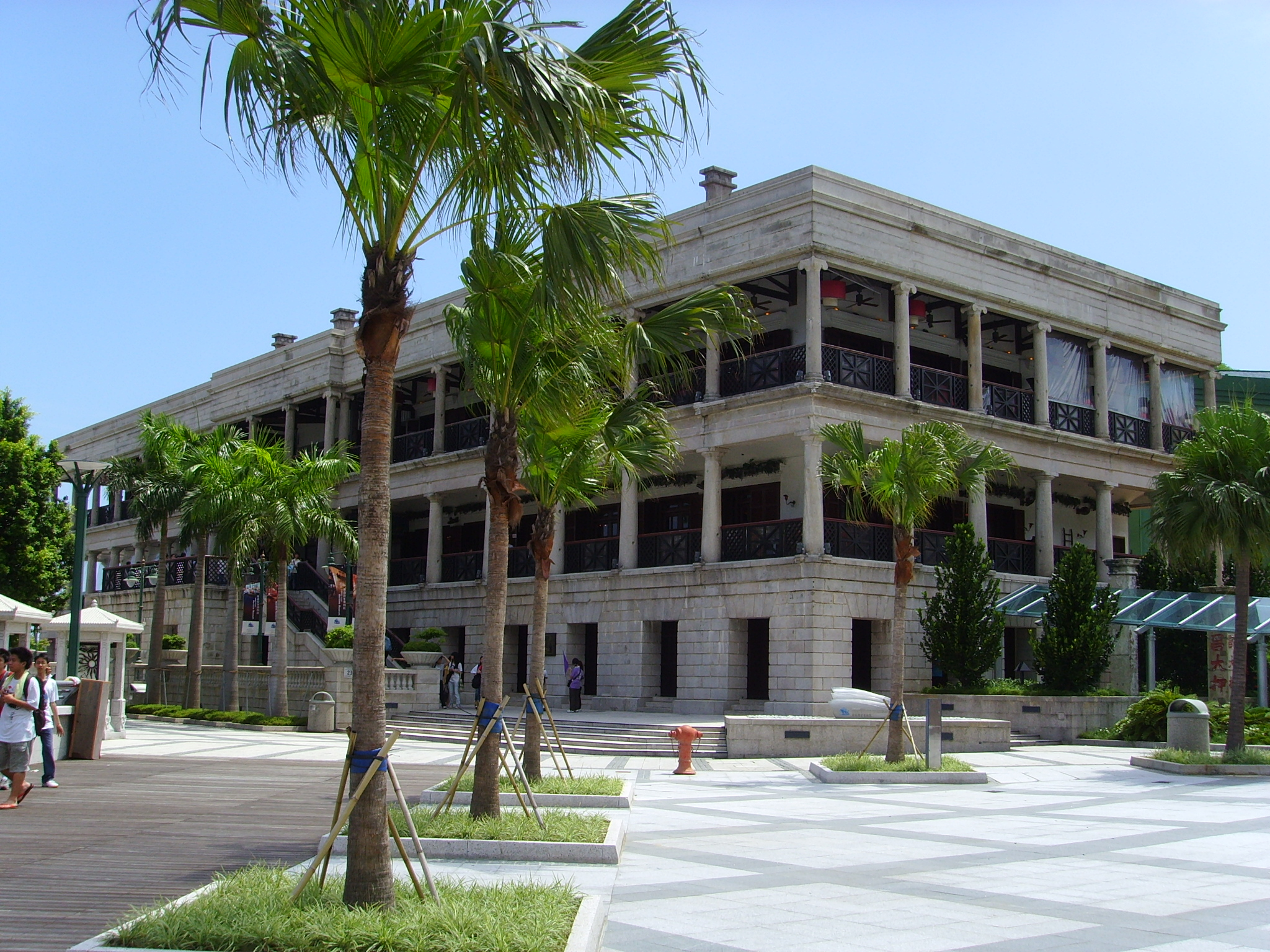
Murray House in Stanley in 2007.

The quarter was known as Officer's Mess in the early days of Hong Kong. It was later renamed Murray House. Before the construction of Bank of China Tower, Murray House was dismantled brick-by-brick in the mid-1980s and later rebuilt in Stanley.

== See also ==
- Osborne Barracks
- Murray Road
- Murray Building
- British Forces Overseas Hong Kong
