= Ho Chi Minh City Hall =

City hall of Ho Chi Minh City, Vietnam

Ho Chi Minh City Hall Ho Chi Minh City People's Council and People's Committee Head Office
- Trụ sở Hội đồng Nhân dân và Ủy ban Nhân dân Thành phố Hồ Chí Minh
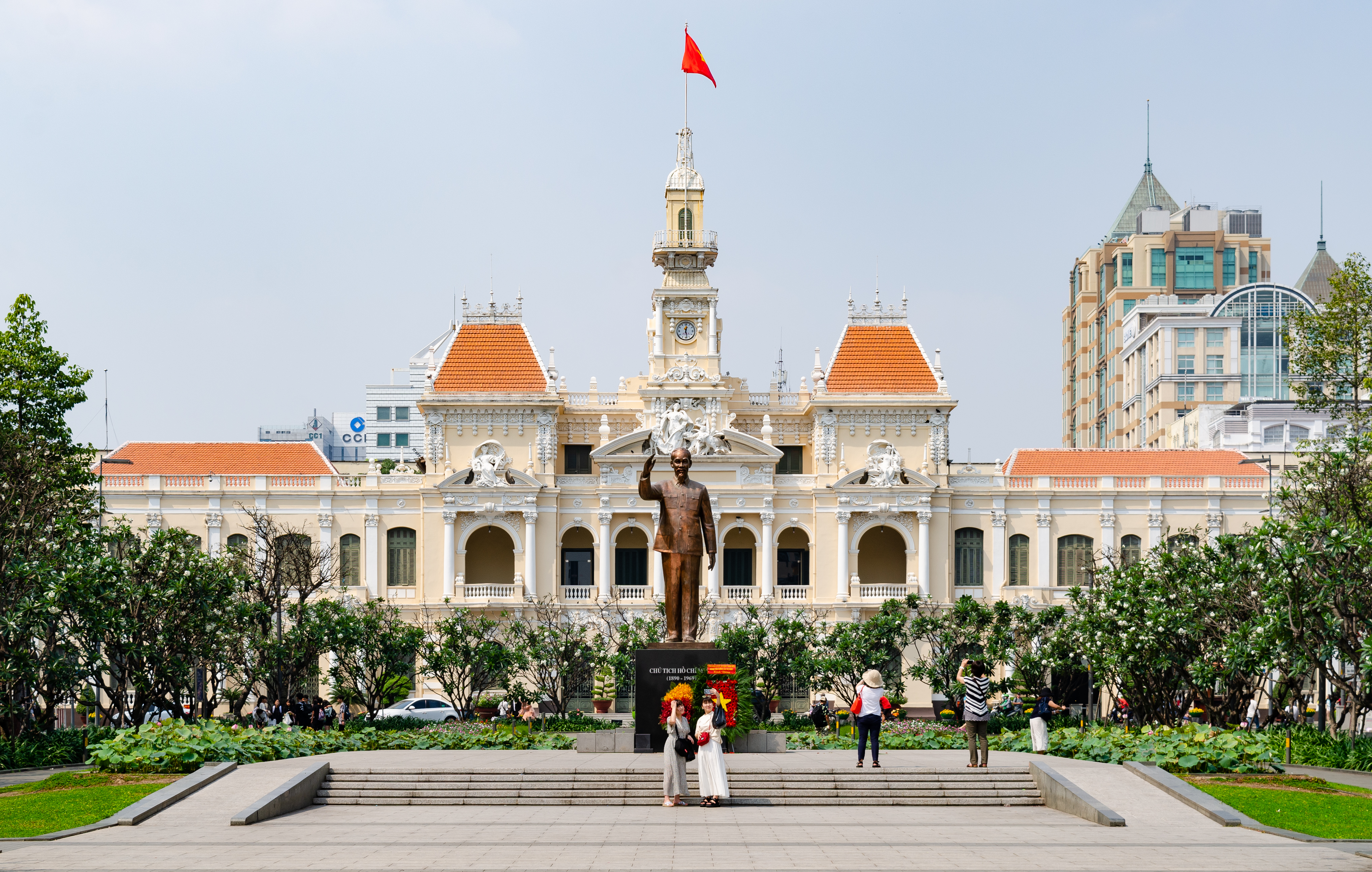
- Ho Chi Minh City Hall looking over Nguyen Hue Boulevard square
- Interactive map of the Ho Chi Minh City Hall; Ho Chi Minh City People's Council and People's Committee Head Office area
- Former names: L'hôtel de ville ("municipal hall"); Tòa đô chánh Sài Gòn ("Saigon mayor's hall")

General information
- Architectural style: Beaux-Arts
- Location: 86 Lê Thánh Tôn Street; 213 Đồng Khởi Street; 152 Pasteur Street, Saigon ward, Ho Chi Minh City, Vietnam
- Coordinates: 10.7765°N 106.7009°E
- Current tenants: Ho Chi Minh City People's Committee
- Groundbreaking: 1898; 128 years ago
- Completed: 1908; 118 years ago
- Cost: Original building: 1.5 million French francs (~US$36 million in 2024)
- Client: French Indochina

Height
- Height: 98 feet (30 m)

Technical details
- Floor count: Original building: 2 Expanded buildings: 2–4
- Grounds: 7,500 square metres (1.9 acres)

Design and construction
- Architect: Fernand Gardè
- Other designers: Facade sculptors: Louis – Lucien Ruffier (1898–1907); Bonnet (1907–1909)

Other information
- Public transit: L1 Opera House station

Ho Chi Minh City Hall, officially called the Ho Chi Minh City People's Council and People's Committee Head Office (Vietnamese: Trụ sở Hội đồng Nhân dân và Ủy ban Nhân dân Thành phố Hồ Chí Minh), is a city hall and the seat of the government of Ho Chi Minh City, Vietnam. It is located in downtown Ho Chi Minh City's Saigon ward, between Pasteur, Lý Tự Trọng, Đồng Khởi, and Lê Thánh Tôn Street, with its front facade facing Nguyễn Huệ Boulevard. The building houses the office of the city's Chairman of the People's Committee, People's Council and various other government departments, such as Transportation, Natural Resources & Environment, Industry & Trade and Home Affairs.

Ho Chi Minh City Hall served as an administrative house for past governments during the French colonial period of Vietnam and Vietnam War. The building now also serves as one of Vietnam's national heritage sites and is open for public at the last weekend of each month.

== History ==
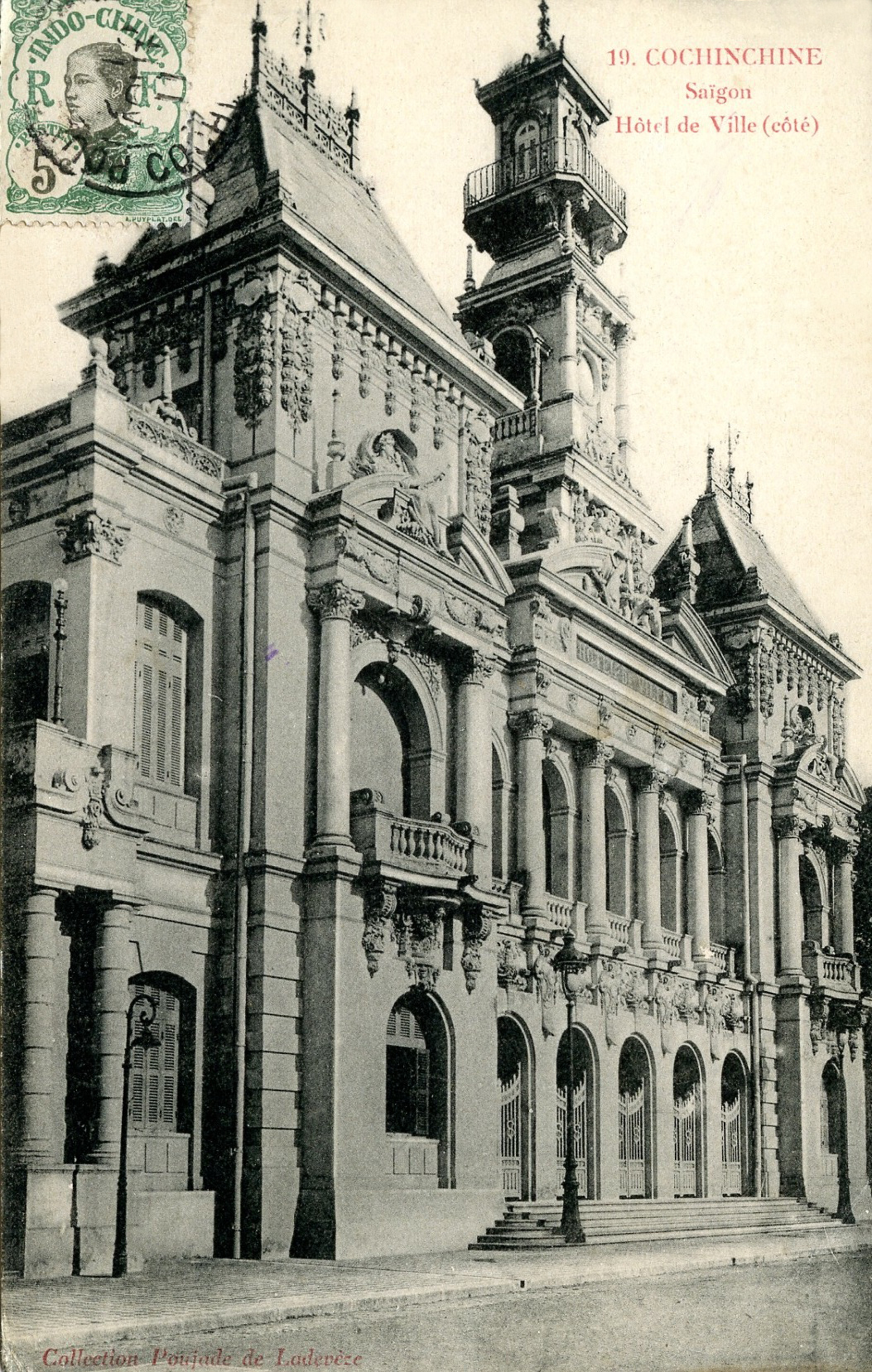
Saigon City Hall on a postcard, n.d.

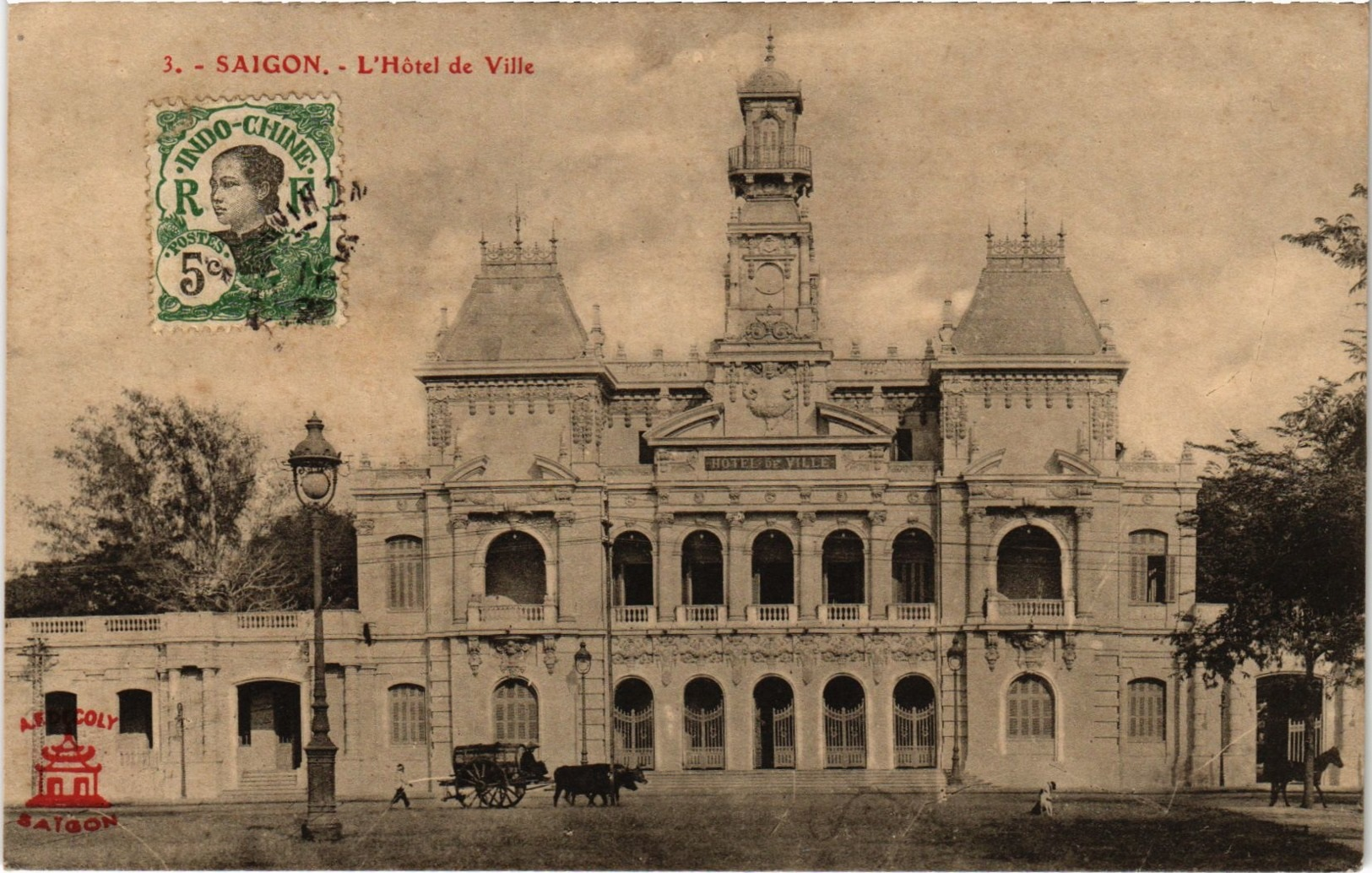
Saigon City Hall on a postcard, 1930

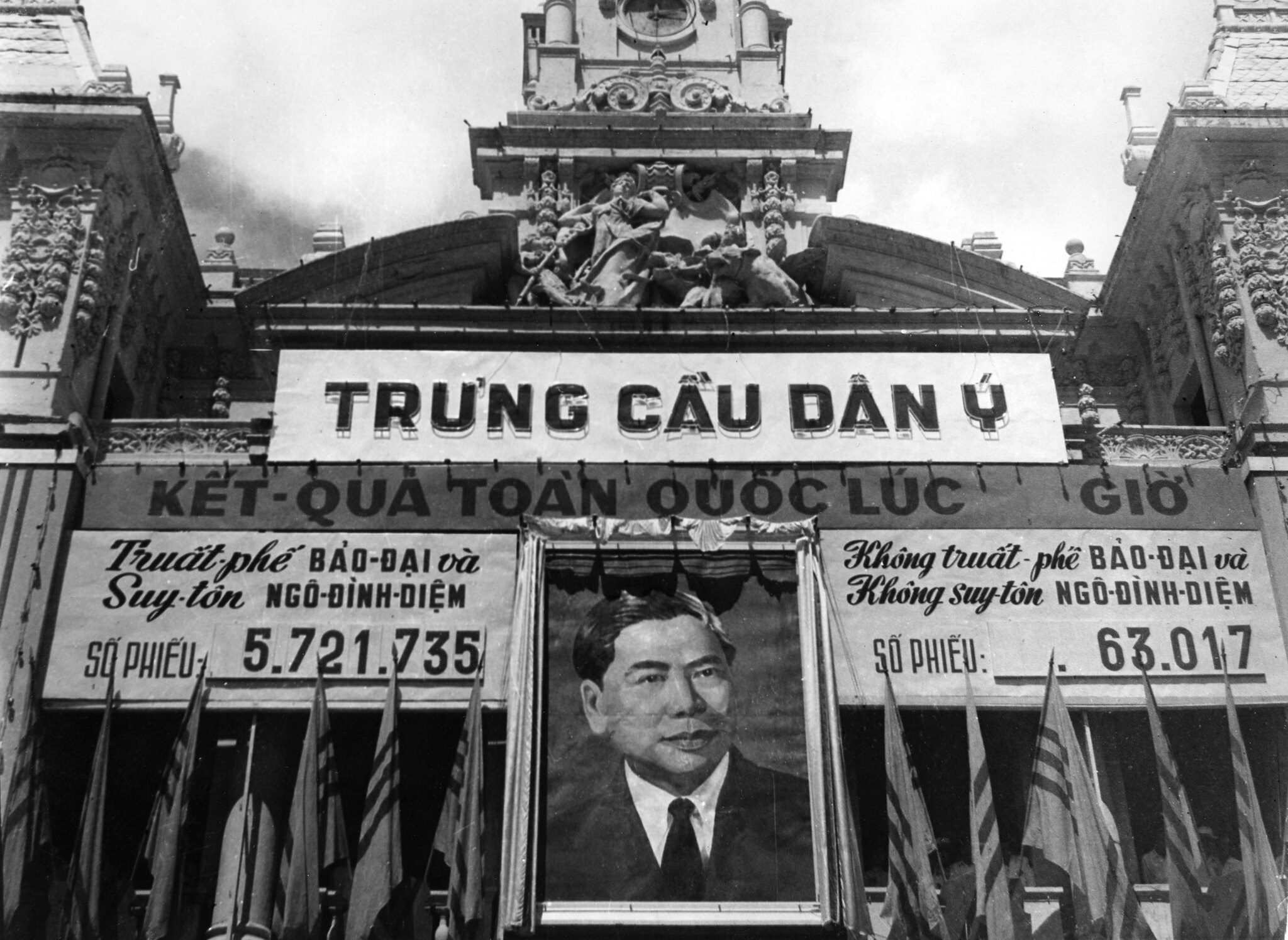
Referendum results between ex-chief of state Bảo Đại and president-to-be Ngô Đình Diệm, 1955

After victories over conquests in Southern Vietnam, in 1870, the French drafted a plan to build an office for municipal council of Saigon at Kinh Lớn ("Big Canal"). However, the area was too muddy to lay a foundation hence halting the project. Until 1898, after the canal was covered to be made into Charner Boulevard, the French finally broke ground for the building. 1.5 million francs was approved for the project. The building was a difficult project that took 11 years to finish.

The building was opened in 1909 by the French Indochina governors-general to celebrate 50 years of French presence in Saigon. The building was named L'hôtel de ville ("Municipal Hall"), while the Vietnamese locals generally called it Dinh xã Tây ('French municipal palace') or Dinh đốc lý or ('mayor's palace').

During the Vietnam War, the building was used by the city of Saigon government under South Vietnam and was renamed Tòa đô chánh Sài Gòn or Tòa đô sảnh ('Saigon mayor's hall').

Since the communists’ conquest of Saigon in 1975, the building has housed the Ho Chi Minh City People's Committee and Ho Chi Minh City People's Council. The building was renamed as it is now.

On April 29 and 30, 2023, to celebrate the Reunification Day, the building was opened to public for the first time.

== Architecture ==
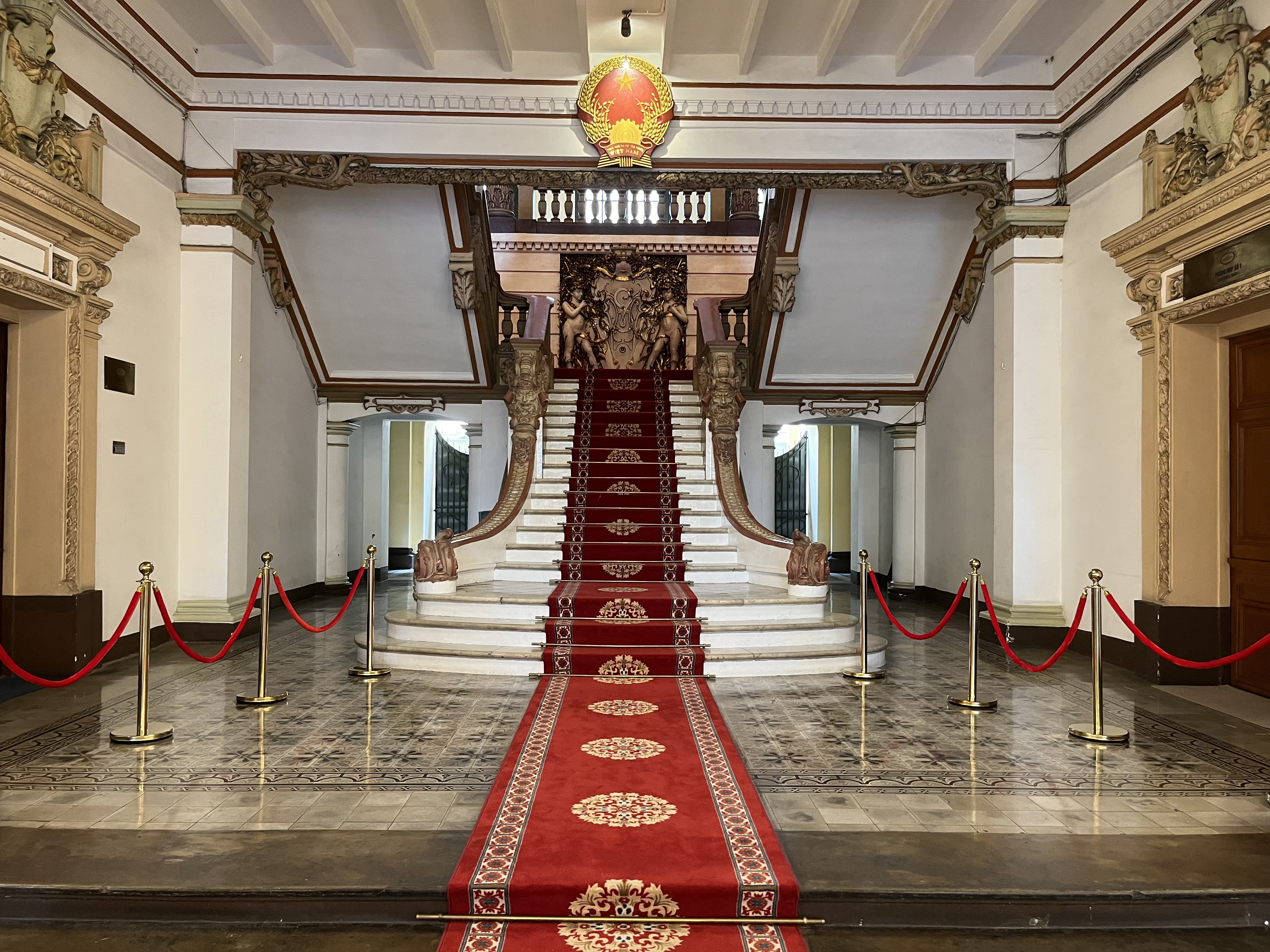
The grand hallway

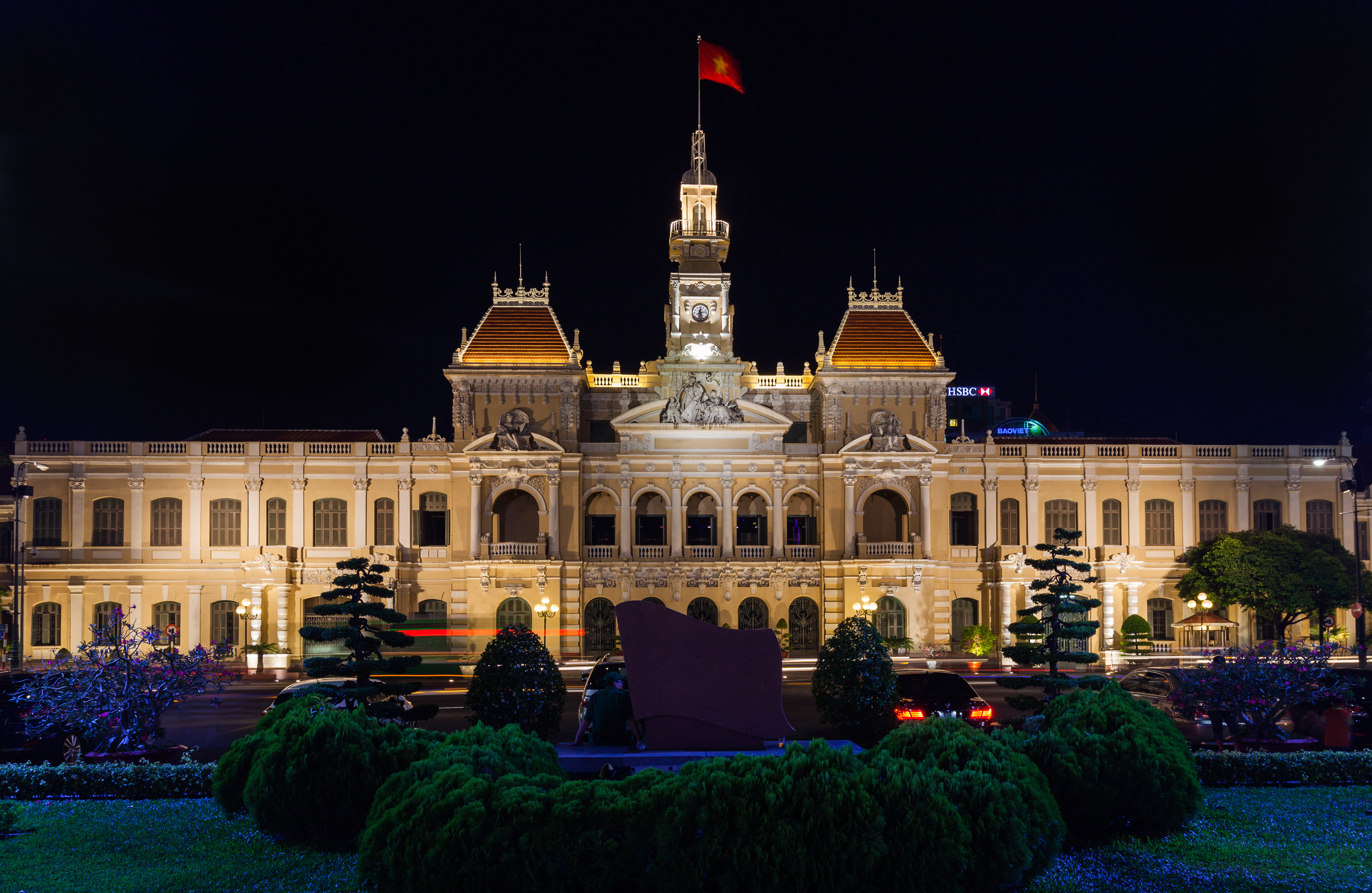
Ho Chi Minh City Hall at night

The building originally comprised a grand hall with a clock tower upon it and 2 single story blocks on the left and right wing, stretching from Pellerin Street to Catinat Street (now Pasteur Street and Đồng Khởi Street).

=== Exterior ===
Directed by architect Fernand Gardè, the hall design took inspiration from the town hall of Paris and resembles the bell towers of northern France – a rising point-shaped tower accompanied by two adequate symmetrical attic towers and shorter but long blocks on the sides. The center tower includes a clock and at its peak a flag pole. Another storey was then built on top of the blocks in the 1940s.

The design of the building is a fusion of multiple classical architectural streams like Renaissance, Baroque and Beaux-Arts, as seen on its with Baroque and Rococo decoration, Art Nouveau iron doors, Corinthian columns and domic entrances. The entire front facade is sculptures of wreaths, ylang ylangs and men in Phrygian cap, reflecting the architecture of the French Third Republic. With so many inspirations taken from, the building was deemed by some as "a woman with too much jewelry".

=== The sculptures on the façade ===
On the facade of the building, three sculptures of Marianne are placed in the middle of the pediments. She is the national personification of liberty, equality and fraternity of the French Republic.

==== The left sculpture ====
The left sculpture shows the figure of Marianne seating on a podium. Her left hand is placed on a vase pouring water while her right hand holds a ship's rudder. She wears a laurel wreath on her head with some laurel decoration on the background. Below the figure is the wheat motif, a Caduceus, and a scythe.

The laurel wreath usually implies victory, while the Caduceus is Hermes's staff, often recalled as the symbol of commercial activity or negotiation. The appearance of the ship's rudder is believed to represent the strength of commerce and trading. The sculpture is an indication of equality.

==== The middle sculpture ====
At the center of the facade, under the bell tower lies a sculpture depicting a goddess and two children and two lions. The child on the left holds a long staff pointing at the female figure, while the boy on the right is stepping between two fierce lions. Marianne is most prominent with her taking-off-Phrygian-clothes posture, similar to the image of half-naked Marianne in the Liberty Leading the People painting. Her position also suggests that they bravely lead each other out of danger and wilderness.

The theme of this sculpture could be liberty as the woman is trying to escape from the mess and wild, with her eye looking up, fulfilled with hope and prospect. Out of the three sculptures, this one is also the most active form of Marianne, as she does not rest but moves vividly. This central sculpture stands for fraternity.

==== The right sculpture ====
The right sculpture also shows Marianne resting position, building the counterpart to the left sculpture. However, she does not wear a laurel wreath like the left one but has a helmet and a Gallic rooster on her head. The Gallic rooster is complementary to Marrianne. While Marianne represents the state and their values, Gallic Rooster is the symbol of France as a nation. The sculpture's left hand is placed on a pelta shield, while her right hand holds a sword and leans on a vase pouring water. Under her feet are different weapons and remnants of a battle. Unlike other sculptures that hardly depict the environment, this sculpture captures a strong wind blowing Marianne's hair.

With the appearance of weapons, a shield, a sword, and a helmet, this sculpture features military strength. The woman's posture of sitting on war remnants also symbolizes France's pride in past victories on the battlefields that have brought about the peace. The sculpture is a signification of liberty.

=== Interior ===
The main entrance consists of five consecutive domes, decorated with floral reliefs and every of its gates are stylized iron doors. Cars will enter the building from a nearby side gate. Another side gate at the address 86B Lê Thánh Tôn is the entrance for the city's Home Affairs Department. These side gates are adequately decorated with festoon motifs.

Entering the main entrance lies a grand hall and a staircase to the first floor. On the landing is a relief of two infants carrying the seal of Saigon. The walls and ceilings throughout the building are covered with paintings of the sky, ylang ylang leaves, Louis X-era laurel wreath and a variety of geometrical shapes, stained glass.

== Renovation and expansion ==
In 1966, during Vietnam War, the building was expanded by adding 3 four-story blocks at the rear of the original building. They now house the offices of Ho Chi Minh City People's Committee and Home Affairs Department.

After the Vietnam War, the building was further expanded and renovated. In 1990, a two-story building is built on the rear left wing for security clearance affairs, and light poles were planted around the building. In 1998, another two-story block was built on the rear right wing. In 2005, the city of Lyon sponsored a project for a facade lighting system. During 2016–2017, a car and motorbike entrance to the underground floor and an internal park were built.

In 2018, the city introduced a new design for the rear blocks of the building, designed by Gensler. The plan was then canceled to "avoid lavish spending".

In 2023, the city approved a US$7.7 million renovation project.

== Early reception ==
Upon opening, the City Hall waged irritation among indigenous citizens due to its high construction costs and design motifs. Local press even attacked the building with negative connotations as “grotesque” and “bad taste”. They regarded the architecture and its details as incomprehensible symbolic allegory. The references to a superior French Republic carved in the exterior did not seem to convey their underlying meanings to a common Vietnamese citizen.

== In popular culture ==
Ho Chi Minh City Hall appeared in the American film The Quiet American (1958).
