= Battery Path =

Street in Central, Hong Kong

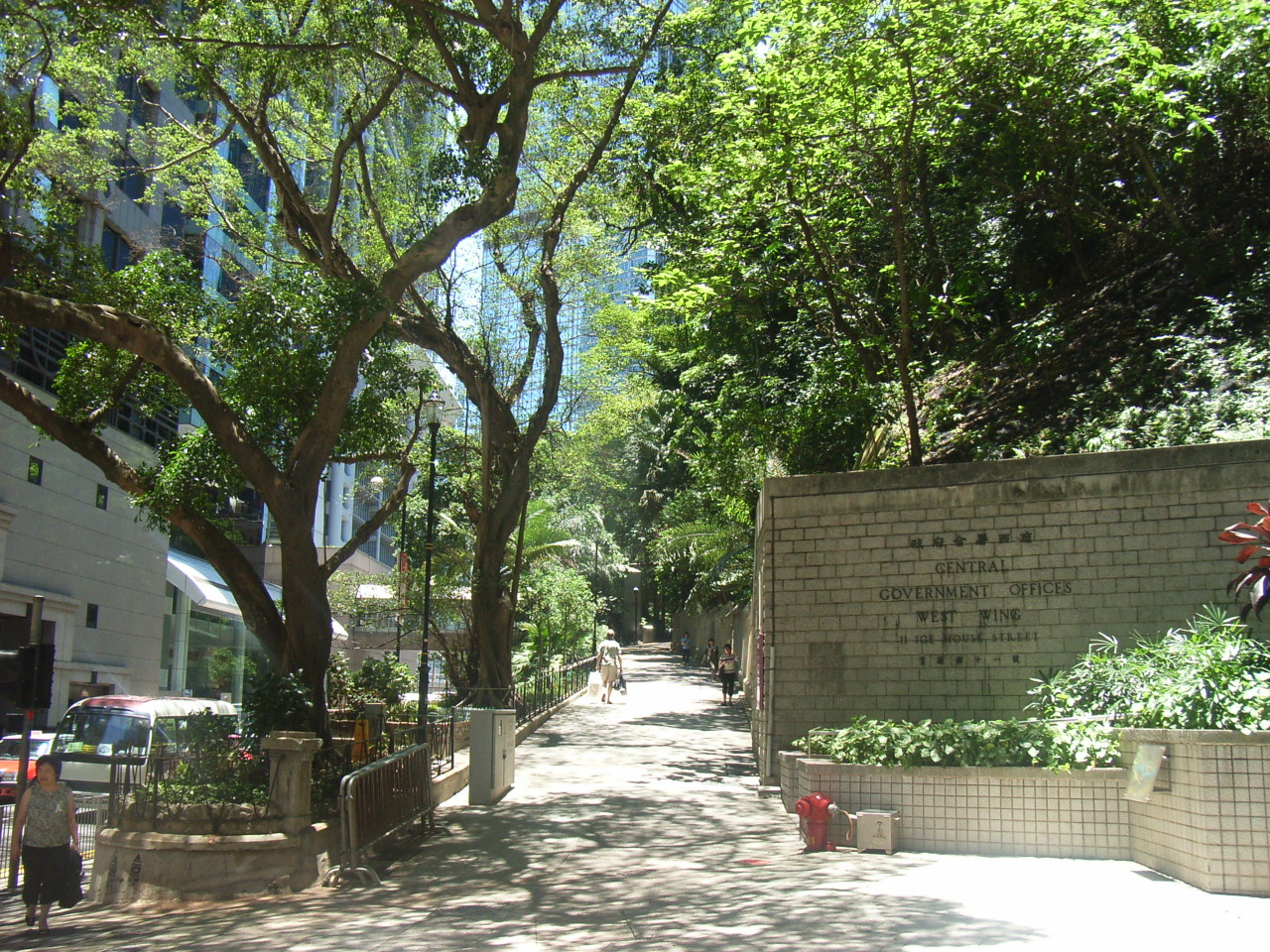
- Entrance of Battery Path, near the junction of Queen's Road Central and Ice House Street
- Interactive map of Battery Path
- Native name: 炮台里 (Yue Chinese)
- Location: Central, Hong Kong
- Coordinates: 22°16′47″N 114°09′34″E
- West end: Queen's Road Central
- East end: Garden Road

Construction
- Completion: 1841

Battery Path
- Chinese: 炮台里
Transcriptions
Standard Mandarin
- Hanyu Pinyin: Pàotái Lǐ
Yue: Cantonese
- Jyutping: paau3 toi4 lei5

Battery Path (Chinese: 炮台里) is a pedestrian-only footpath located beneath Government Hill in Central, Hong Kong. Named after Murray Battery, it stretches from Queen's Road Central to Garden Road. The path is noted for many historical landmarks situated on it, most notably the Former Central Government Offices, the Former French Mission Building and St. John's Cathedral.

== History ==
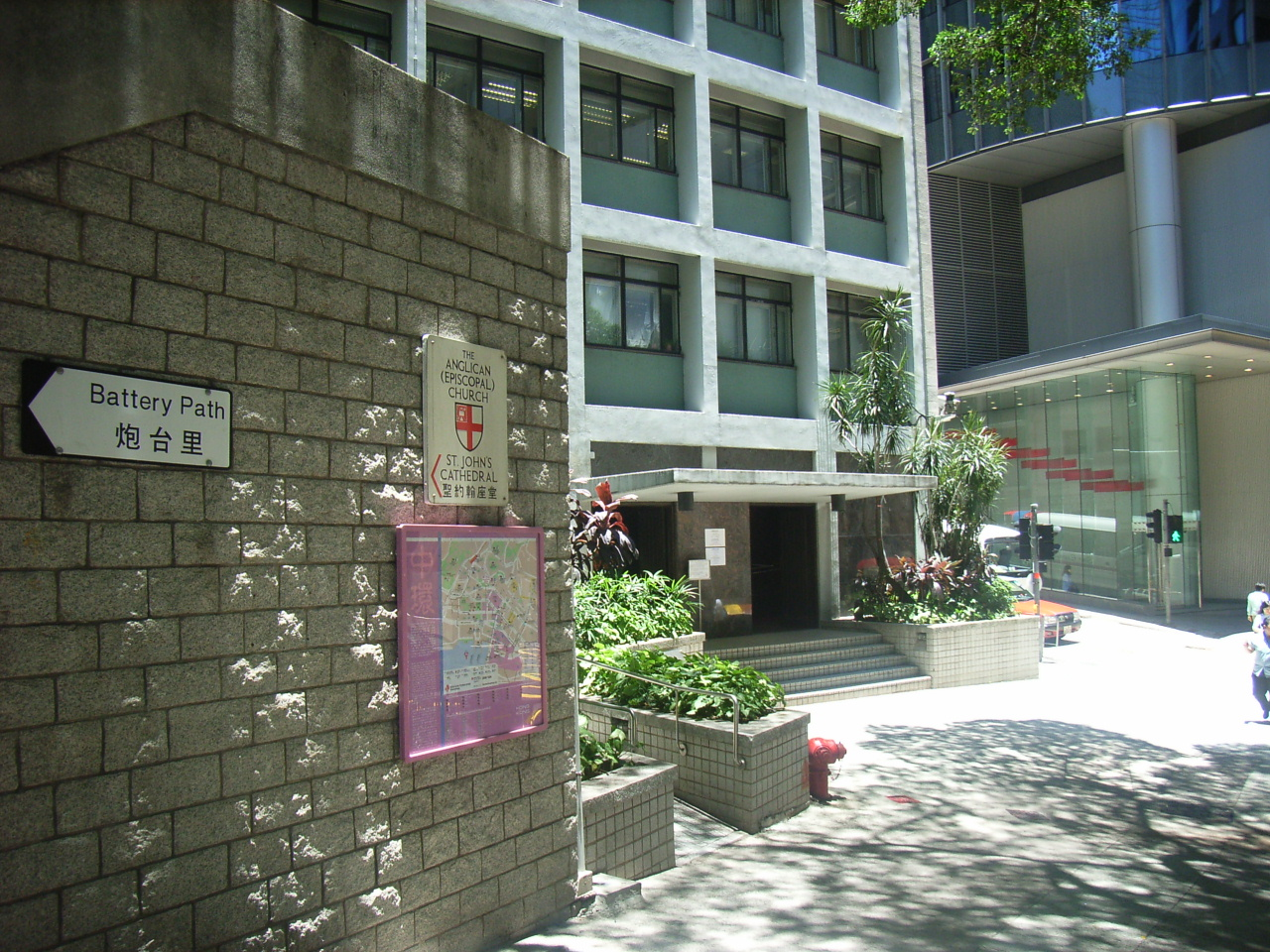
The West Wing of the Former Central Government Offices as seen from Battery Path.

During the First Opium War, the British occupied Hong Kong in 1841, and—one year later— the territory was ceded to them in the Treaty of Nanking. The new administration chose the site around present-day Battery Path to build its headquarters and defences. Construction on the path was completed in approximately 1841, at around the same time that its namesake—Murray Battery—was built. At the time, both the path and the battery were located on Hong Kong Island's waterfront with Victoria Harbour. However, it is now situated much farther inland due to the amount of land reclamation that has been undertaken since its opening.

During the early twentieth century, the path was popular with—and frequented daily by—sedan chair drivers, who would take advantage of the shade provided by the banyan that lined the sides of the road. Although the use of sedan chairs ceased after the 1960s, the trees remain in the same place.

== Description and features ==
From its western end, Battery Path begins at the junction between Queen's Road Central and Ice House Street. It is separated from the main thoroughfare through a series of stairs elevating the path above Queen's Road; the stairs are located next to the West Wing of the Former Central Government Offices. The next landmark on the route is the Former French Mission Building. Located at 1 Battery Path, this neoclassical building currently houses the Court of Final Appeal. The path ends at the intersection with Garden Road, where St. John's Cathedral is located.

== See also ==
- List of streets and roads in Hong Kong
- Murray Battery
