= Saigon BRT =

Planned bus rapid transit system

Overview
- Locale: Ho Chi Minh City
- Transit type: Bus rapid transit

Operation
- Began operation: 2022 (planned)
- Operator: Ho Chi Minh City Department of Transportation and Public Works

The Saigon BRT (Vietnamese: Xe buýt nhanh Thành phố Hồ Chí Minh) is a planned bus rapid transit system in Ho Chi Minh City, Vietnam. Scheduled to open in 2022, the BRT's No. 1 route will operate using electric buses from District 1 to Binh Chanh District.
