= Ministry of Works and Transport =

Ministry of Works and Transport can refer to:

- Ministry of Works and Transport (Botswana)
- Ministry of Works and Transport (Malaysia)
- Ministry of Works and Transport (Namibia)
- Ministry of Works and Transport (Uganda)
