= Saigon Passenger Transportation Company =

Saigon Passenger Transportation Company is a provider of public transport and hired shuttle services (for factories and schools) in Ho Chi Minh City, Vietnam.

== Services ==
Satranco provides public transit services to a city of motorcycles and bicycles.

Satranco provides hired shuttle services to schools and factories in HCMC:

- Toshiba
- Fujifilm
- Panasonic
- XIMĂNG HÀ TIÊN 1
- THIẾT BỊ ĐIỆN 1
- XÍ NGHIỆP MAY
- DA XUẤT KHẨU 30/4

== Routes ==
Satranco offers public transit services within HCM City via various routes:

City Transit

- Bến Thành-TSN Airport bus route
- SàiGòn-Bình Tây bus route
- Express bus for students/pupils
- Express bus for workers
- # 7 GÒ VẤP - CHỢ LỚN
- # 41 VÒNG ĐẦM SEN - BÀU CÁT
- # 45 BẾN THÀNH - BẾN XE QUẬN 8
- # 27 BẾN THÀNH - ÂU CƠ - CHỢ TÂN XUÂN
- # 26 BẾN THÀNH - BẾN XE MIỀN ĐÔNG
- # 28 BẾN THÀNH - TÂN SƠN NHẤT
- # 152 BẾN THÀNH - SÂN BAY TÂN SƠN NHẤT
- # 11 SÀI GÒN - ĐẦM SEN
- # 1 SÀI GÒN - CHỢ BÌNH TÂY
- # 2 SÀI GÒN - BẾN XE MIỀN TÂY
- # 612 DĨ AN - BẾN XE MIỀN ĐÔNG
- # S4 KTX ĐHQG - BẾN XE MIỀN TÂY
- # 31 KHU DÂN CƯ - TÂN QUY - KHU DÂN CƯ BÌNH LỢI
- # 42 CHỢ CẦU MUỐI - CHỢ TAM BÌNH
- # 148 BX MIỀN TÂY - GÒ VẤP
- # 38 KDC TÂN QUY - BẾN THÀNH - CV LÊ THỊ RIÊNG
- # 49 HỒ KỲ HOÀ - CHỢ LỚN - CHỢ BÌNH PHÚ
- # 142 BẾN THÀNH - NGUYỄN KHOÁI - CV TÔN THẤT THUYẾT
- # 139 LÊ HỒNG PHONG- BẾN XE MIỀN TÂY
- # 60 BẾN XE AN SƯƠNG - KCN VĨNH LỘC - KCN LÊ MINH XUÂN
- # 64 MIỀN ĐÔNG - ĐẦM SEN
- # 62 BẾN XE QUẬN 8 - LÀNG HOA GÒ VẤP
- # 70 MAXIMAX CỘNG HÒA - CHỢ XUÂN THỚI THƯỢNG
- # 71 AN SƯƠNG - PHẬT CÔ ĐƠN
- # 95 KCN TÂN BÌNH - BẾN XE MIỀN ĐÔNG
- # 91 BẾN XE MIỀN TÂY - CHỢ NÔNG SẢN THỦ ĐỨC
- # 93 BẾN THÀNH - LINH TRUNG
- # 96 BẾN THÀNH - CHỢ LỚN - CHỢ BÌNH ĐIỀN

Suburban Services

Satranco also operates suburban-transnational and interprovincial bus service:

- International route TP. HCM - PHNOMPENH (Cambodia)
- HCM City - Quảng Nam - inter-provincial
- HCM City – Đà Nẵng - inter-provincial
- THCM City - Nha Trang - inter-provincial

Charters

Chartered Services are provided for tour groups in and around HCM City.

== Fleet ==
=== Current ===
- Samco H76 Hi-class
- Samco H68 CNG
- Isuzu Samco I51 CNG
- Isuzu Samco I47 Diesel

=== Retired ===
- Mercedes-Benz Conecto (Built locally by Mercedes-Benz Vietnam under the name City Star, comes with 2 variants, B80 and B55)
- Isuzu Samco bus - based on Egra Mio medium-duty buses
- Hyundai NSAC F/L
- Huyndai Super Aero City CNG (1 unit)
- Transinco 1-5 K30HFC - based on Toyota Coaster minibus
