= Ministry of Public Works and Urban Development =

Government ministry of Yemen

Ministry of Public Works and Urban Development (Arabic: وزارة الأشغال العامة والتطوير الحضري) is a government ministry of Yemen.
