= Ho Chi Minh City Department of Transportation =

Ho Chi Minh City Department of Transportation (Vietnamese: Sở Giao thông Vận tải Thành phố Hồ Chí Minh) is a city department responsible for transportation and public works projects in Ho Chi Minh City.

The department also operates public bus system in Ho Chi Minh City.

== Fleet ==
The fleet consists of green air-conditioned buses made by Saigon Automobile Transportation Engineering Corporation and based on South Korean design (Daewoo).

- Isuzu Samco Egra Mio medium-duty buses

The department aims to purchase electric buses for the Saigon BRT.

== See also ==
- Saigon Passenger Transportation Company
