= Justice Place =

Office complex in Central, Hong Kong

Coordinates: 22.279076°N 114.158911°E

- 律政中心
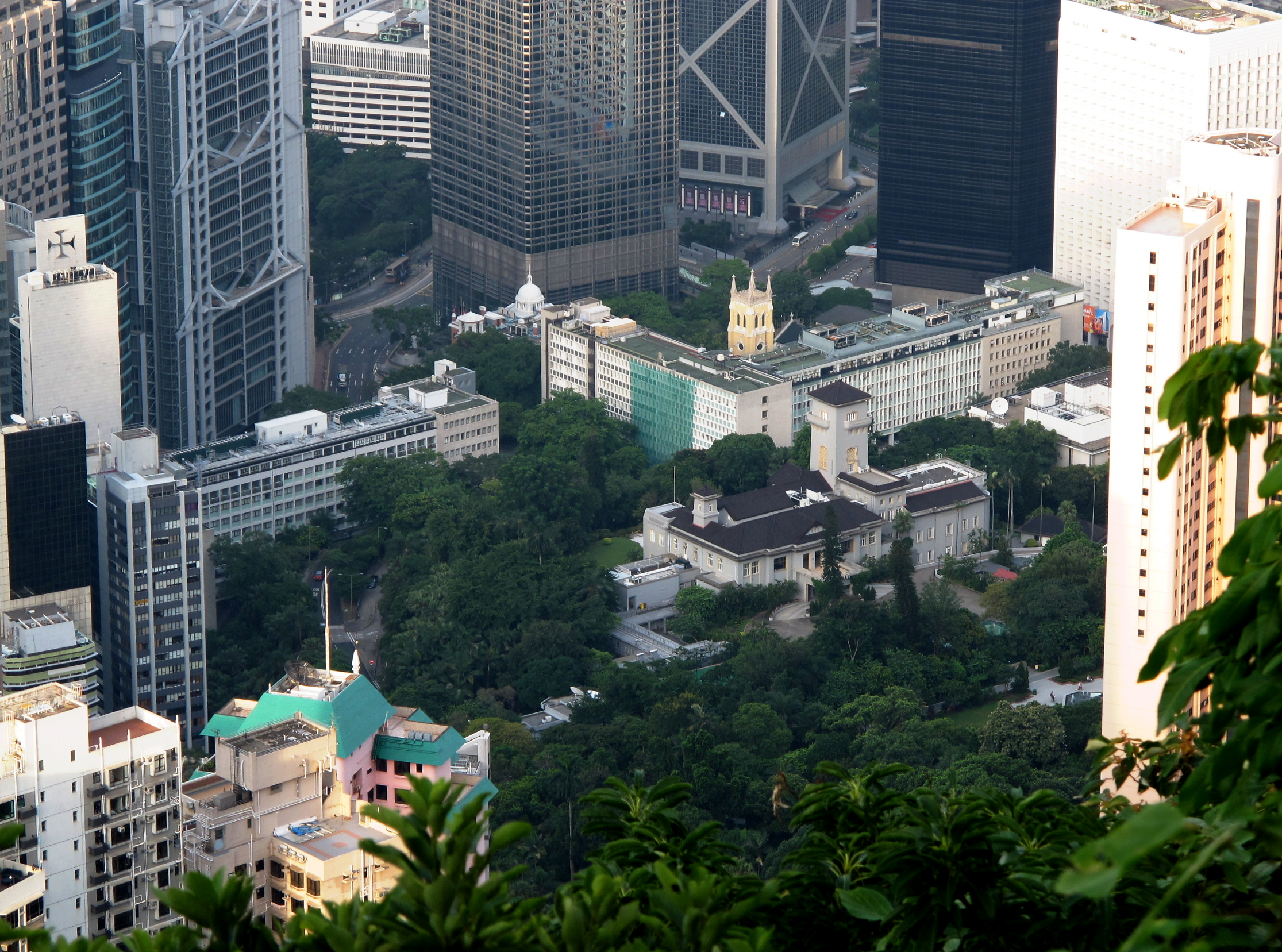
- Central Government Offices Building, view from the Peak
- Interactive map of the Justice Place area
- Former names: Former Central Government Offices; Government Headquarters

General information
- Architectural style: International
- Location: Central, Hong Kong, China
- Current tenants: Department of Justice
- Completed: 1957; 69 years ago
- Opened: 9 January 1957; 69 years ago
- Owner: Hong Kong Government

Technical details
- Floor area: 42,097 m^{2}

Design and construction
- Architect: Public Works Department

Hong Kong Graded Building – Grade I
- Designated: 2012

Central Government Offices
- Traditional Chinese: 中區政府合署
- Simplified Chinese: 中区政府合署
Transcriptions
Standard Mandarin
- Hanyu Pinyin: Zhōngqū Zhèngfǔ hé Shǔ
Yue: Cantonese
- Yale Romanization: Jūng kēui jing fú hahp chyúh
- Jyutping: Zung1 koei1 zing3 fu2 hap6 cyu5

Government Headquarters
- Traditional Chinese: 政府總部
- Simplified Chinese: 政府总部
Transcriptions
Standard Mandarin
- Hanyu Pinyin: Zhèngfǔ Zǒngbù
Yue: Cantonese
- Yale Romanization: Jing fú júng bouh
- Jyutping: Zing3 fu2 zung2 bou6

Justice Place
- Chinese: 律政中心
Transcriptions
Standard Mandarin
- Hanyu Pinyin: Lǜ Zhèng Zhōngxīn
Yue: Cantonese
- Yale Romanization: Leuht jing jūng sām
- Jyutping: Loet6 zing3 zung1 sam1

Justice Place (also called the Former Central Government Offices) is an office building complex that serves as the headquarters of the Department of Justice. The complex is located in Central, Hong Kong, occupying the lower level of Government Hill.

The complex formerly housed most of the major offices of the Hong Kong Government. The offices of the government have been relocated to the Main Block of the Central Government Complex in Admiralty.

== History ==
=== Background and construction ===
The complex stands on land that had been in use as government offices since the 1840s and replaced an earlier set of buildings known as the Old Secretariat Building, which was built in 1847 and demolished in 1954 to make way for the current buildings. The government, which had outgrown the old building and had to rent private premises scattered across Central to house its offices, accepted a proposal to build a new set of offices on the site in 1949. Named the Central Government Offices, the plan would involve housing 12 government departments on the same site, bringing the Treasury, the Medical and Health Department, and other departments under one roof.

The offices were constructed in three separate phases in the 1950s, with the East Wing being the first to be completed in 1954, followed by the Main Wing in 1956, and finally the West Wing in 1959. Governor Alexander Grantham hosted the opening ceremony for the Main and East wings on 9 January 1957.

The complex was likely designed by architects in the Public Works Department, who deliberately designed the buildings to be low-rise in order to preserve an unobstructed view of the harbour from Government House. The site is in close proximity to some of the most significant heritage buildings in Hong Kong, including Government House, St John's Cathedral and the former French Mission Building.

=== As the Central Government Offices (1954-2011) ===
The Legislative Council of Hong Kong met here until 1985, when it moved to the old Supreme Court Building.

The following departments occupied the building in the early to mid-2000s, prior to the construction of the new offices in Tamar:

- West Wing
  - Civil Service Bureau
  - Financial Services and the Treasury Bureau
  - Economic Development Bureau
  - Housing, Planning and Lands Bureau
- Main Wing
  - Constitutional Affairs Bureau
  - Security Bureau
  - Chief Executive
- East Wing
  - Security Bureau

=== Preservation efforts in the 2000s and 2010s ===
In 2002, the government approved plans to replace the complex with a new 110,000-square-foot (10,000 m^{2}) office at the Tamar basin, scheduled to be completed by 2010. Apart from government offices, the Tamar site would also house the Legislative Council and provide not less than 22,000 square metres of open space for public enjoyment. The cost for developing the entire Tamar site was estimated to be HKD 5.2 billion.

In his 2009 Policy Address, Chief Executive Donald Tsang announced the government's intention to retain the Main and East Wings for the justice department's use, and proposed to tear down the remaining West Wing, which the Antiquities Advisory Board's appraisal deemed to be of "lower value" and suggested could be demolished for redevelopment. The Development Bureau and Planning Department launched a two-month consultation the following year on the government's proposal to redevelop the West Wing site into a 32-storey commercial and shopping complex. In response, community groups made efforts to protect the historic site.

=== As Justice Place (2015-present) ===
The complex now houses the Department of Justice and other law-related organisations, with most of the department taking up the Main and East wings.

== Buildings in the complex ==
=== Main Wing (18 Lower Albert Road) ===
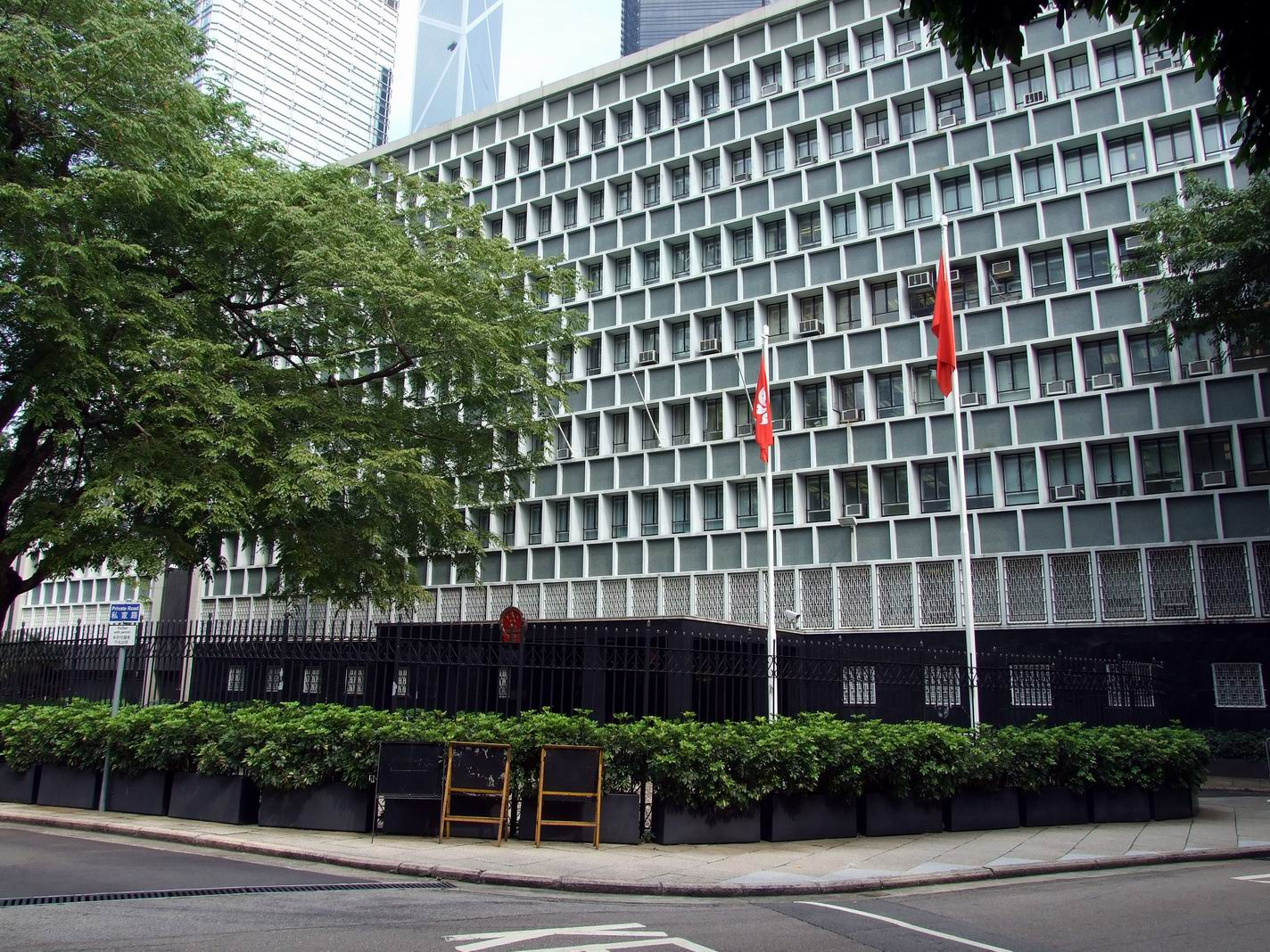
Central Government Offices (Main Wing)

Completed in 1956 with 8 floors and known as the Central Wing when it was first constructed, the Main Wing formerly housed the offices of Hong Kong's most senior government officials, as well as the chambers of the Legislative and Executive councils.

An appraisal commissioned by the Antiquities Advisory Board and conducted by Purcell Miller Tritton judged the Main Wing to be "the most interesting architecturally" and likely to also be the most historically significant. It is the smallest of the three wings.

The Legislative Council Chamber in the Main Wing was located in a fan-shaped structure annexed to the north side of the building. The building that housed the chamber was demolished in the 1980s after the Legislative Council moved to the old Supreme Court Building to make way for a new annex to the Main Wing. Around the same time, a new block housing the Executive Council Chamber was built when the council relocated to the Main Wing from the East Wing.

The Main Wing served as the public face of the complex and its forecourt was the site of many protests and important public announcements. A series of fences was erected in 1998 after the transfer of sovereignty of Hong Kong to the People's Republic of China in 1997 to keep out protestors who had not applied for permission to enter.

The Main Wing is now home to the offices of the Secretary for Justice, and the department's Civil Division, International Law Division, Administration and Development Division, and part of the Law Drafting Division.

=== East Wing (20 Lower Albert Road) ===
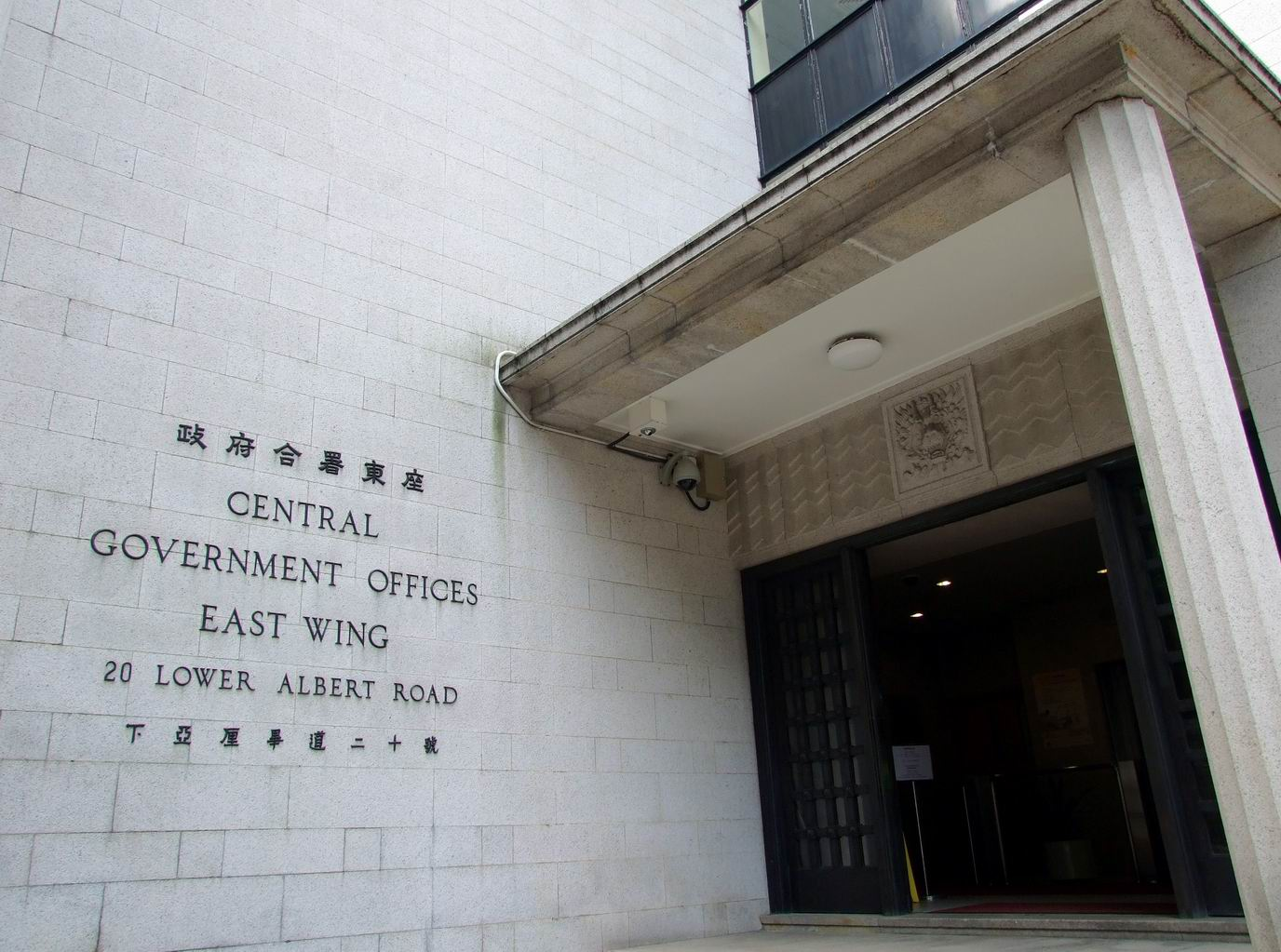
Central Government Offices (East Wing)

With 7 floors, the East Wing was completed in 1954, with some elements of its design influenced by the Art Deco style. The Antiquities Advisory Board's appraisal of the East Wing called it an "elegant building" that marked a transition from a "classical Beaux Arts" towards a "more modern functionalist" style, while not being "properly functionalist". The building is connected to the Main Wing.

The original plans for the East Wing saw the building house internal government offices and the chamber and secretariat for the Executive Council. An additional floor was constructed in 1962, with a pedestrian subway connecting to the Murray Building added later in the 1960s.

The East Wing now accommodates the Constitutional and Policy Affairs Division and parts of the Civil and Law Drafting divisions.

=== West Wing (11 Ice House Street) ===
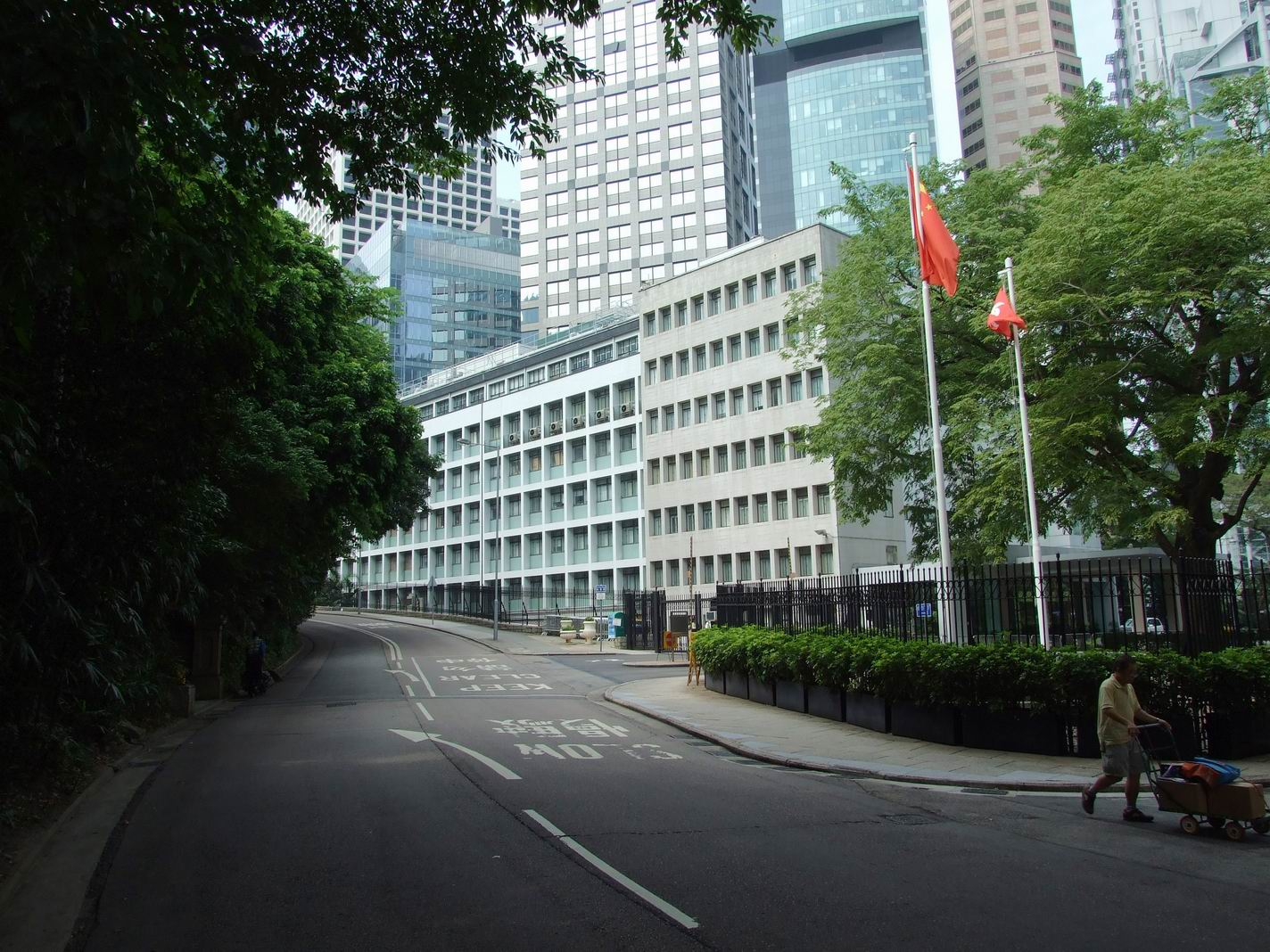
The West Wing viewed from Lower Albert Road

A functionalist L-shaped structure completed in 1959, the West Wing is the largest building in the complex. The building originally housed the government's public-facing offices as well as Members' offices for the Legislative Council. It now houses the Department of Justice's Prosecutions Division and part of the Civil Division, as well as the Hong Kong Mediation Centre.

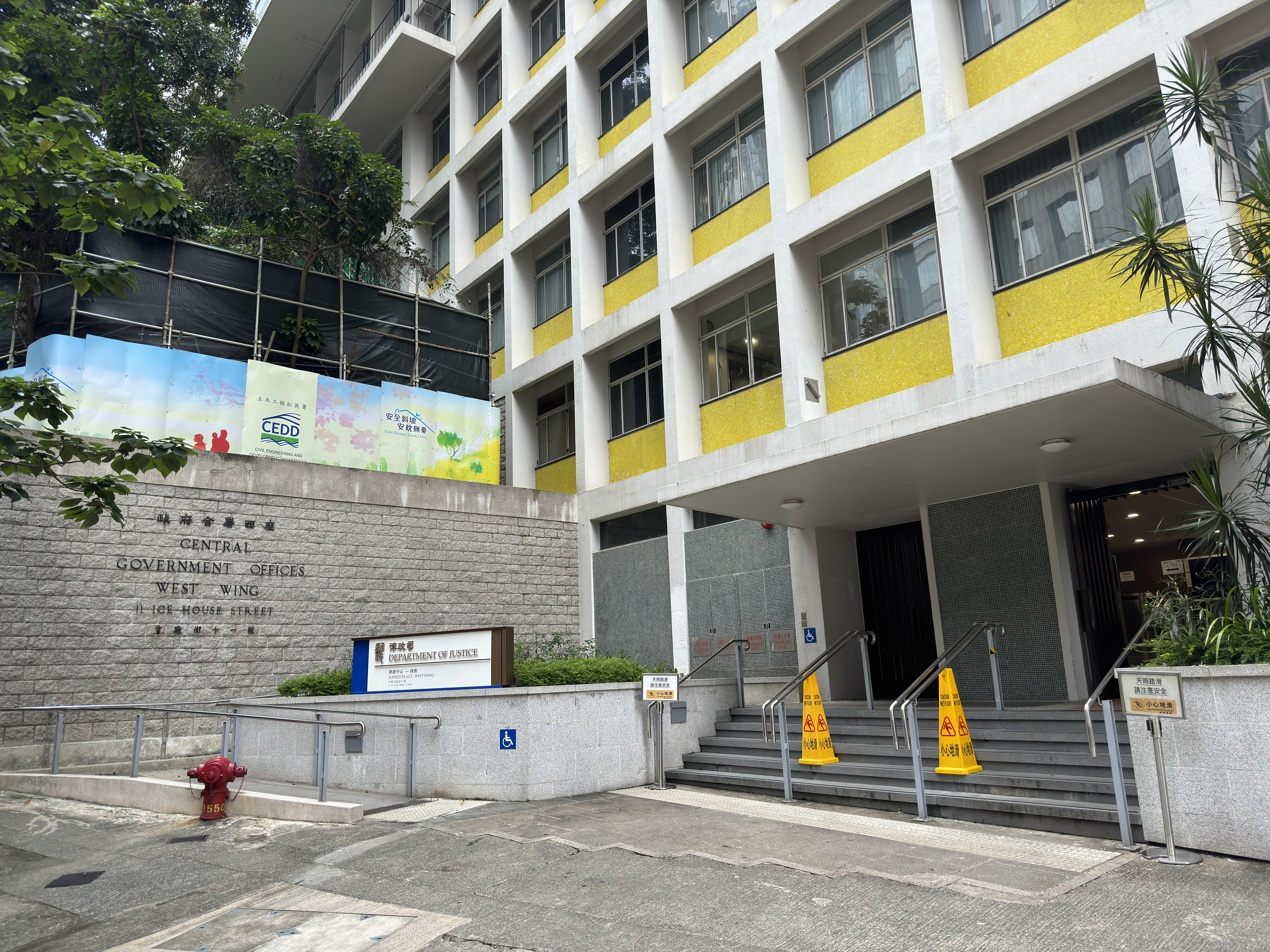
The entrance of the West Wing on Ice House Street in 2024.

== See also ==
- Central Government Complex, Tamar
- Government Secretariat (Hong Kong)
- Legislative Council Building

Preceded by Old Central Government Offices - Main Wing (until 1954)	Home of the Legislative Council of Hong Kong; 1957 – 1985	Succeeded by Old Supreme Court Building
