= Government Hill =

Hill in Central, Hong Kong

Coordinates: 22.27889°N 114.15944°E

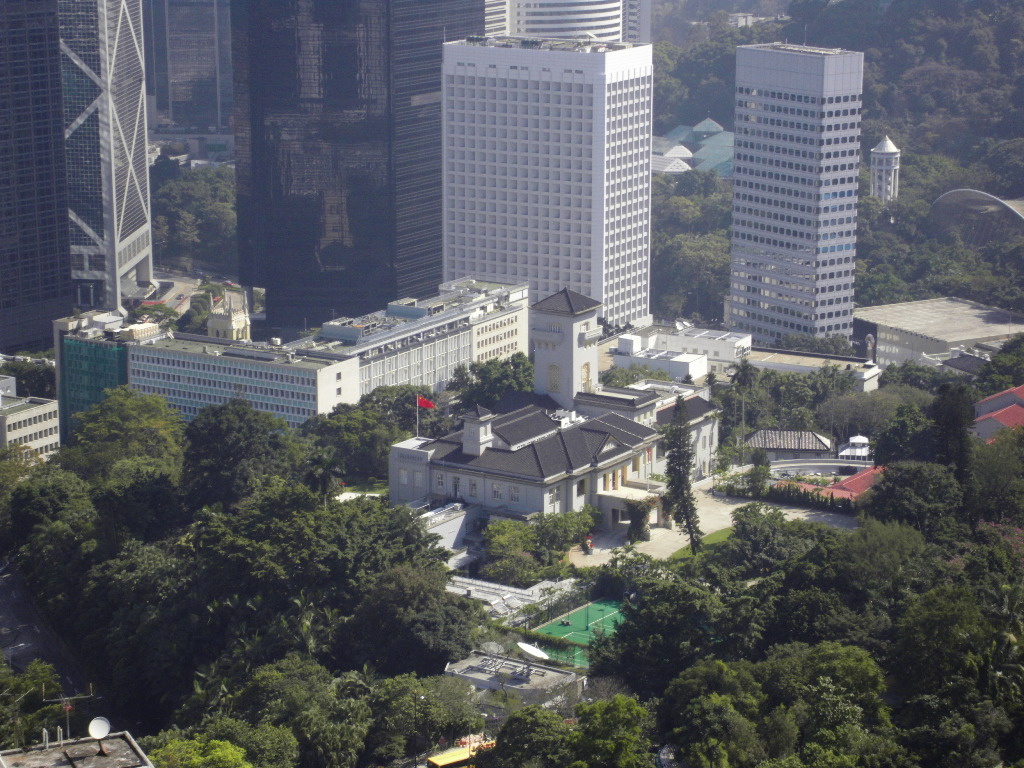
- Government Hill

Naming
- Native name: 政府山 (Chinese)

Geography
- Location: Central, Hong Kong

Government Hill
- Chinese: 政府山
Transcriptions
Standard Mandarin
- Hanyu Pinyin: Zhèngfǔ Shān
Yue: Cantonese
- Yale Romanization: Jing fú sāan
- Jyutping: Zing3 fu2 saan1
- IPA: [tɕɪ̄ŋ fǔː sáːn]

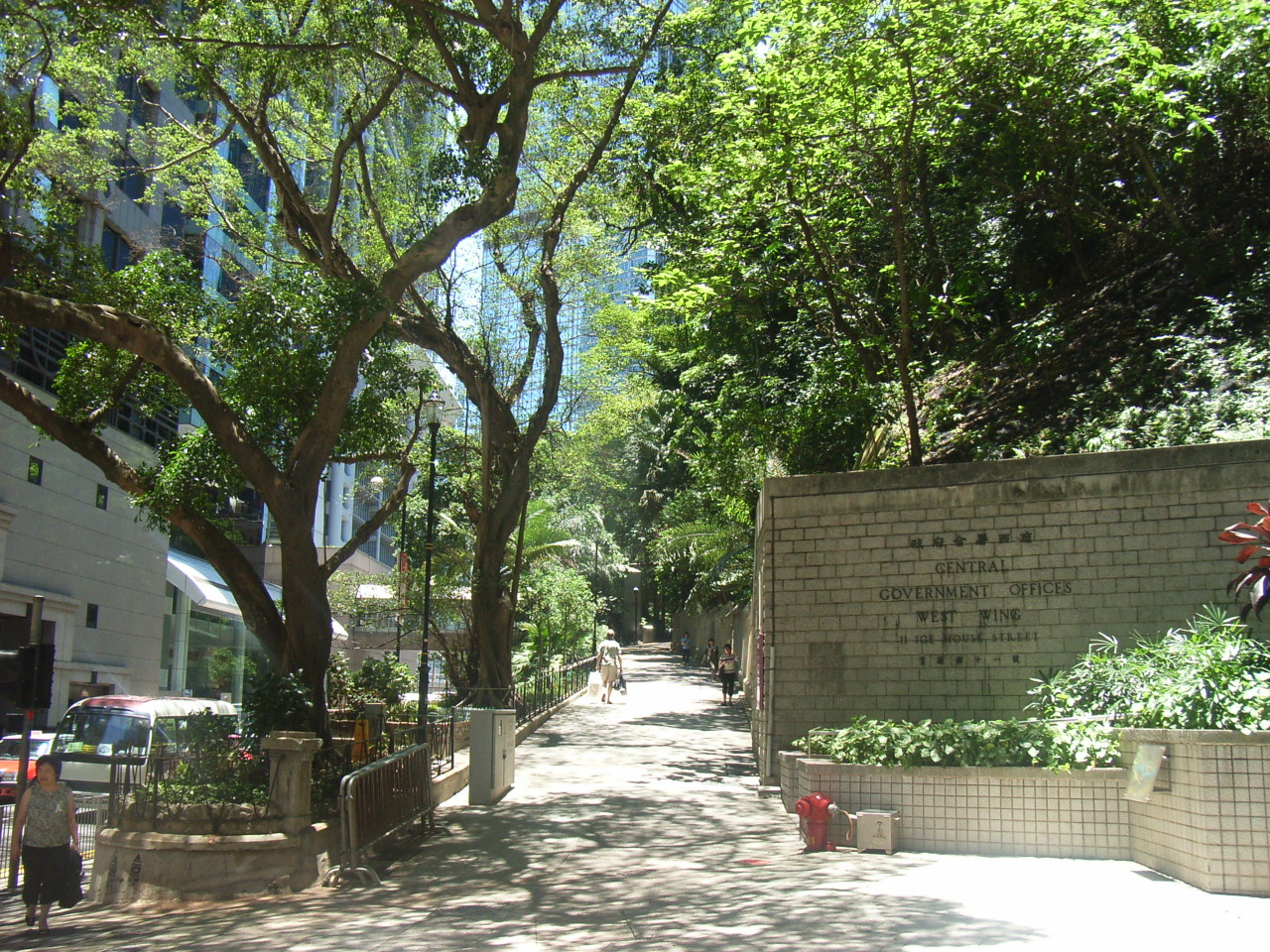
Battery Path, Government Hill, Central

Government Hill is a hill in Central, Hong Kong, bounded by upper section of Upper Albert Road on the south, Queen's Road Central north, Garden Road east, and Glenealy, west of Hong Kong Island.

The hill has been the administrative centre of Hong Kong since the early days of British colonial rule, and has remained so after the transfer of sovereignty to China in 1997. Government House, the residence of the chief executive and the colonial governor, and the Former Central Government Offices (Government Headquarters), occupied large portions of the hill.

St. John's Cathedral of the Hong Kong Sheng Kung Hui, the Anglican Church in Hong Kong, is also on Government Hill. Adjacent to it is the Court of Final Appeal, inside the Former French Mission Building, with Battery Path leading to Queen's Road Central.

Beside the already crowded central business district, the hill is free from skyscrapers and preserved many century-old trees. Higher up the hill in the south is Hong Kong Zoological and Botanical Gardens.

In 2011, an application was made to the Town Planning Board to rezone the area as a historic site, and cap the building heights to the height of the existing buildings.

== See also ==
- Parliament Hill, Ottawa
- Parliament Hill, London
- Queen's Park, Toronto
- Capitol Hill, Washington, D.C.
- Capital Hill, Canberra
- Raisina Hill, New Delhi
