= Old Central Government Offices =

Former headquarters of British Hong Kong government departments

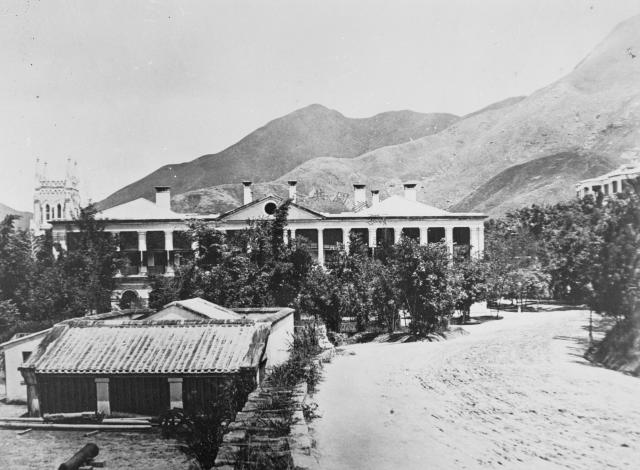
- Central Government Offices in 1869
- Interactive map of the Old Central Government Offices area

General information
- Architectural style: Colonial
- Coordinates: 22.2799°N 114.1578°E
- Year built: 1847
- Demolished: 1954
- Cost: £14,393

Technical details
- Floor count: 2

The Old Central Government Offices was home to many of the Hong Kong Government's departments from 1847 to 1954. Built in 1847 as the Old Secretariat Building, it was also home to the territory's Legislative Council from the 1930s to 1954.

== History ==
=== Background and construction ===
The land on which the building sat was originally occupied by four government buildings. They were replaced by the larger Secretariat Building, which was constructed from 1847 to 1848. The foundation stone for the new building was laid on 24 February 1847 and was completed in 1848 at a cost of £14,393.

At the time of its completion, the building was known as the "Government Offices, St. John's Place", with the first floor serving as the home of the Colonial Secretary's Department and the Legislative Council Chamber, and the ground floor housing the Public Works Department.

=== Redevelopment ===
By the late 1800s, space in the building, now often known as the Secretariat Building, was running scarce. The Surveyor General suggested constructing a new government office building on Murray Battery, but the proposal was not implemented. The Legislative Council created the Government House and City Development Fund in 1934 to finance a redevelopment of the former City Hall, Government House and the Secretariat Building, but the plan was abandoned in 1939 due to insufficient funding. A scaled-down scheme was proposed in lieu of the plan, but it never went ahead, presumably due to World War II.

The population boom and the associated rise in the size of the government's establishment after the war meant that departments were scattered across Central in rented or requisitioned premises. Additionally, the Secretariat building was infested with white ants and timber rot.

The two-storey building was demolished in 1954 to make way for new Central Government Offices (now Justice Place).

| Preceded by Government House, Hong Kong - Main Ballroom | Home of the Legislative Council of Hong Kong; 1930s – 1954 | Succeeded by Former Central Government Offices - Main Wing |
