= Former French Mission Building =

Monument in Hong Kong

- 前法國外方傳道會大樓
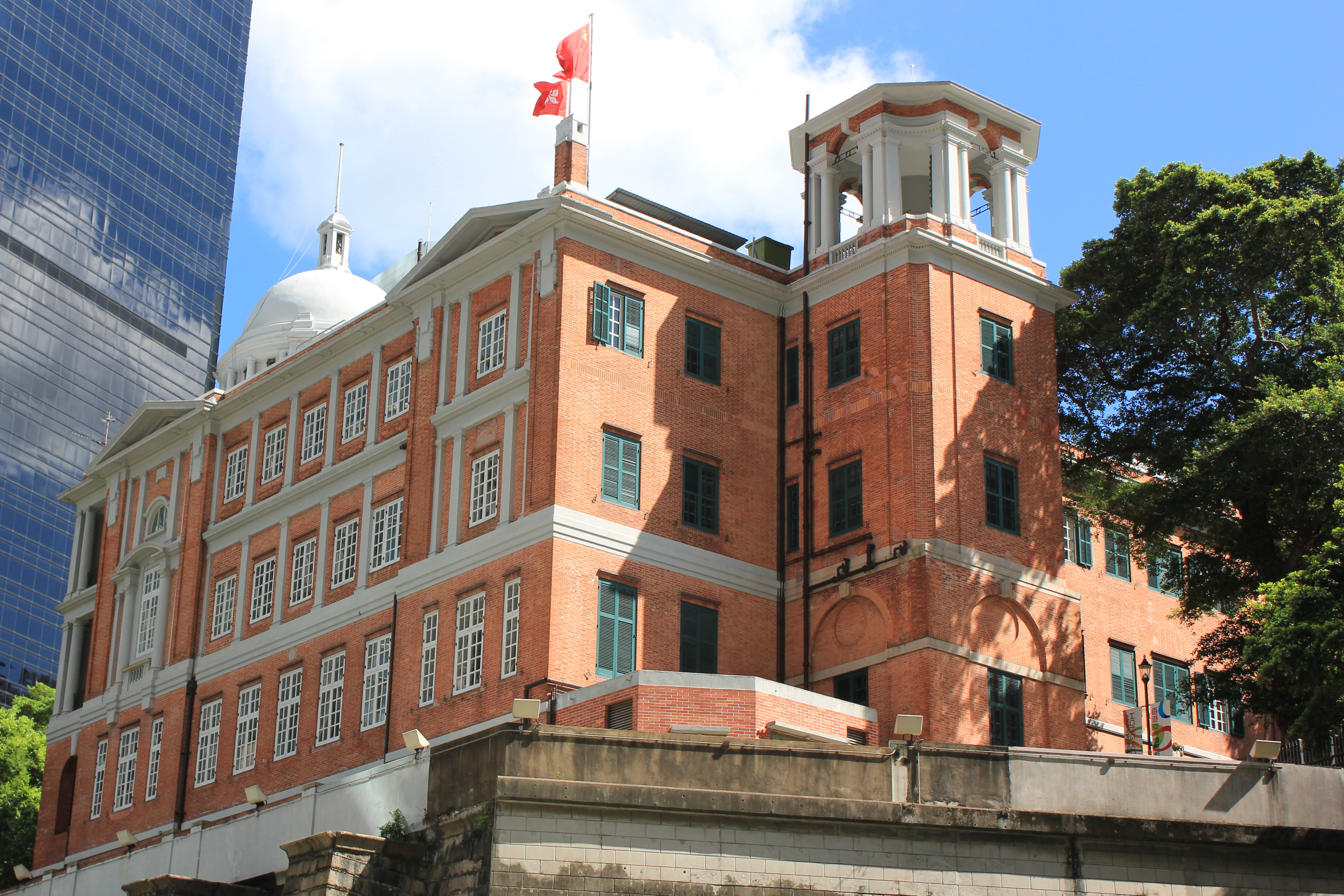
- The Former French Mission Building in Central, Hong Kong.
- Interactive map of the Former French Mission Building area

General information
- Architectural style: Neo-Classical
- Location: Central, 1 Battery Path, Hong Kong
- Coordinates: 22°16′45.75″N 114°9′34.71″E
- Named for: Paris Foreign Missions Society
- Completed: 1842
- Opened: 1917
- Renovated: 1870s
- Owner: Hong Kong Government

Design and construction
- Architecture firm: Leigh & Orange
- Designations: Declared monument

Former French Mission Building
- Traditional Chinese: 前法國外方傳道會大樓
- Simplified Chinese: 前法国外方传道会大楼
Transcriptions
Standard Mandarin
- Hanyu Pinyin: Qián Fǎguó Wàifāng Chuándào Huì Dàlóu
Yue: Cantonese
- Yale Romanization: Chìhn faat gwok ngoih fōng chyùhn douh wúih daaih làuh
- Jyutping: Cin4 faat3 gwok3 ngoi6 fong1 cyun4 dou6 wui5 daai6 lau4

The Former French Mission Building is a declared monument located on Government Hill at 1 Battery Path in Central, Hong Kong. It housed the Court of Final Appeal of Hong Kong from 1 July 1997 to 6 September 2015.

== Features ==
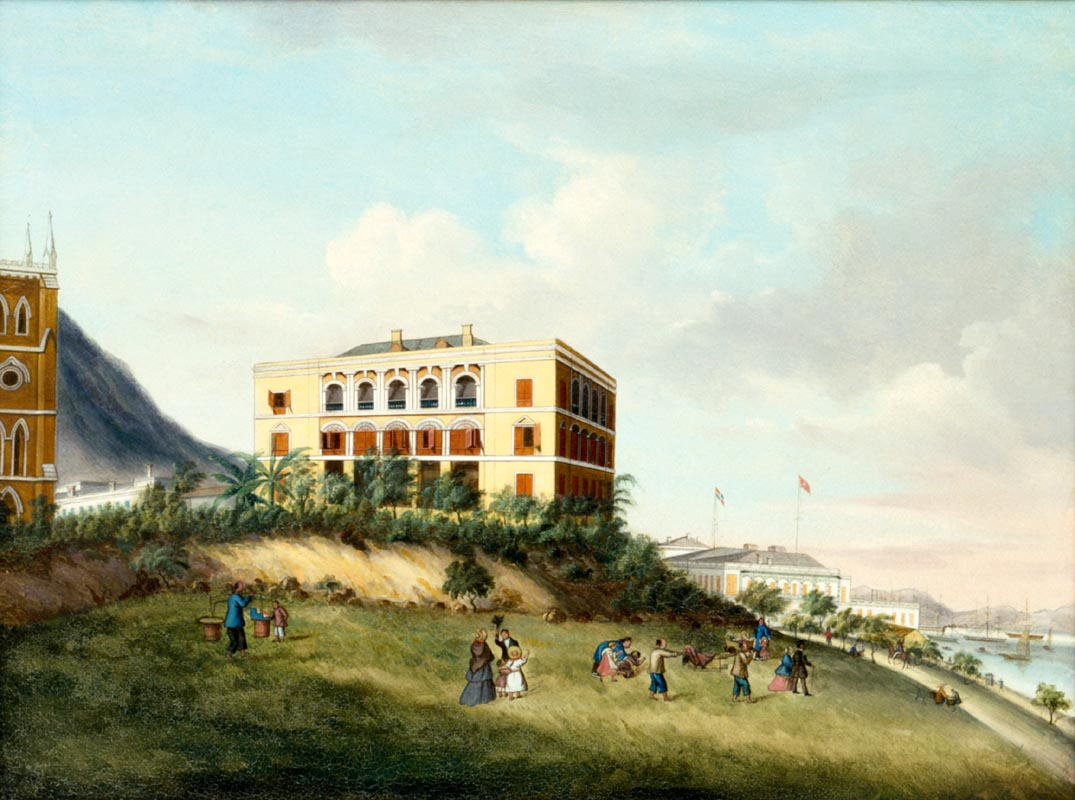
The building in the late 19th century, then a residence of Augustine Heard and Company. St. John's Cathedral is visible on the left.

The building sits on a podium because it is located on Government Hill. Originally a mansion called Johnston House, the building was altered in the 1870s and 1880s to a three-storey building. The present three-storey building opened in 1917 as the result of a major renovation, also described as an "extensive rebuilding", of the previous structure. The building is probably based on a previous structure near the site known as "Beaconsfield", but it is clad in red brick rather than an all white façade. It is constructed in granite and red bricks in Neo-Classical style, dating from the Edwardian period.

== History ==
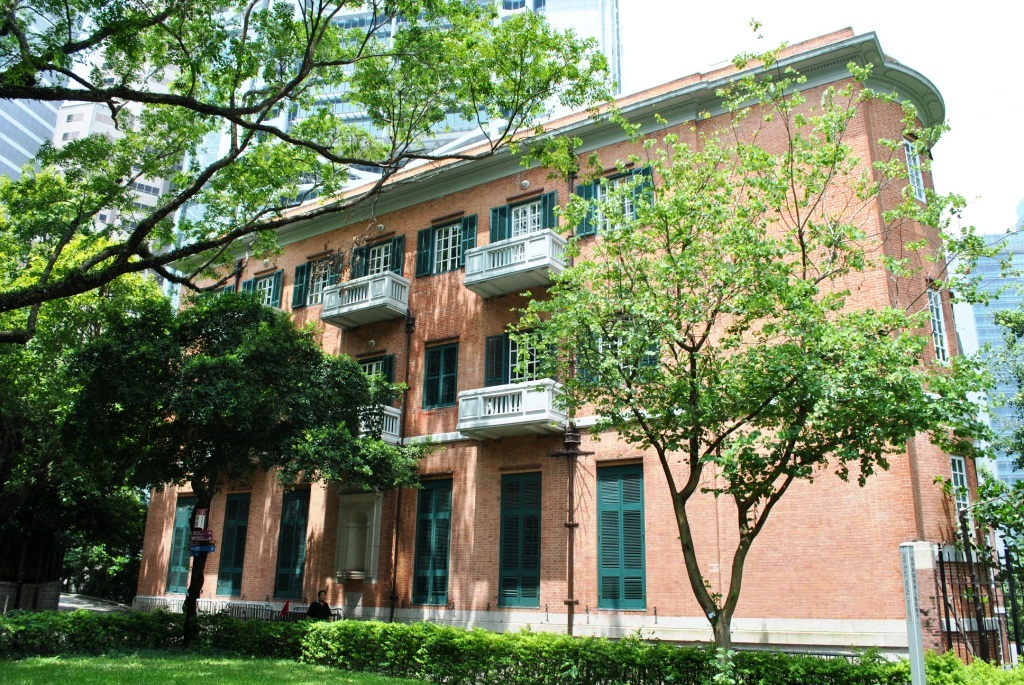
Back of the Former French Mission Building.

The original structure on this site dated back to 1842. The first Governor of Hong Kong, Sir Henry Pottinger resided there from 1843 to 1846. His successor, John Francis Davis also lived there for a while, before moving to Caine Road. The building likely served as one of the earlier homes of the Legislative Council of Hong Kong during this period (1843–1846). The building then had several owners, including Emanuel R. Belilios, and was occupied among others by the tai-pans of Augustine Heard and Company, a trading firm that went bankrupt in 1876. It was also used by HSBC and was home to the Russian Consulate in the 1870s. The government then leased the building from 1879 and, by 1911, the Sanitary Board and Registrar-General's offices were located in the building.

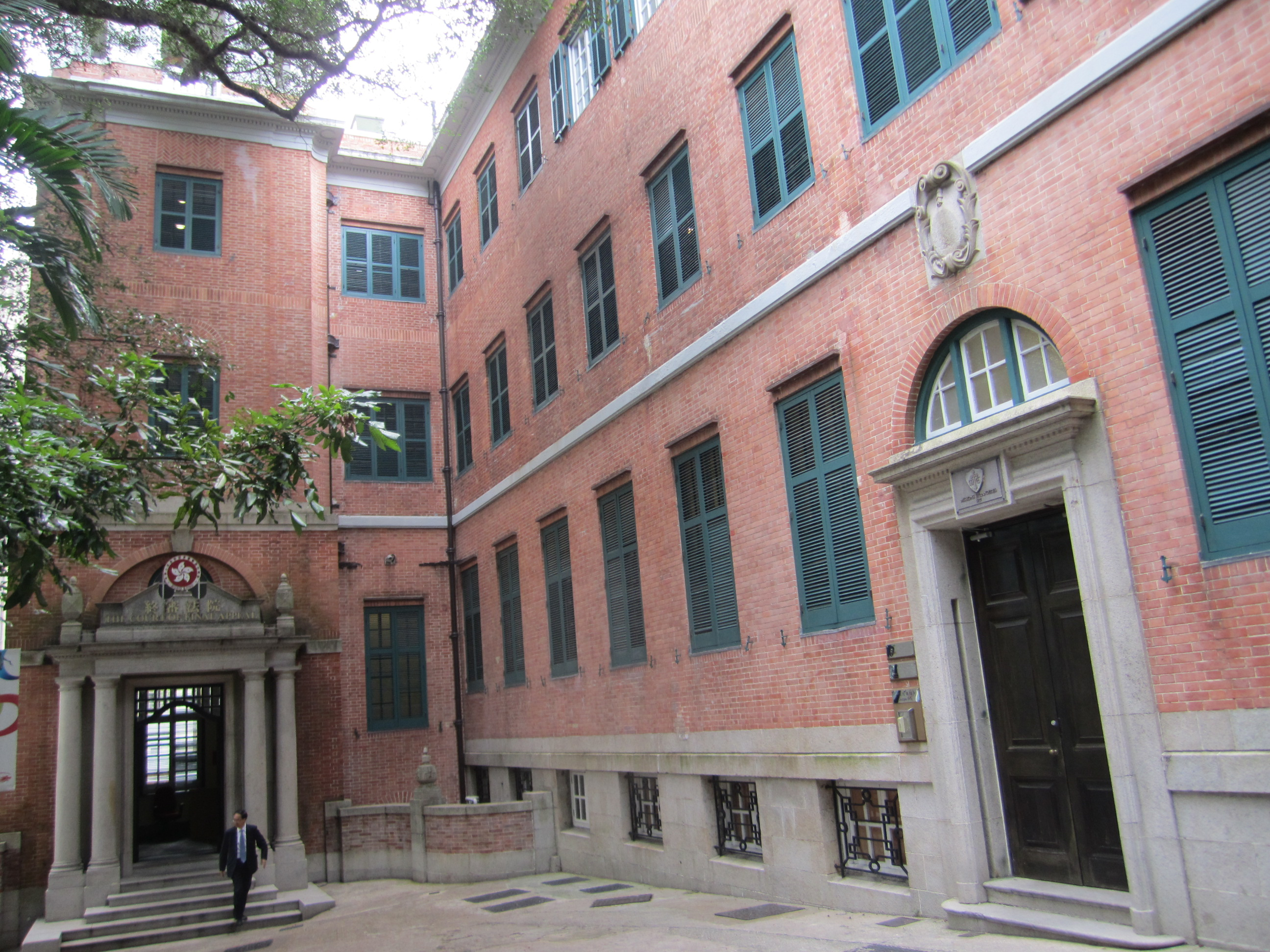
Entrance as the Court of Final Appeal (left).

In 1915, it was acquired by the Paris Foreign Missions Society, which commissioned a major renovation. The architects were Leigh & Orange. In the process, a chapel topped by a cupola was added in the north-west corner, and the building was refaced with red bricks. It reopened in 1917 and became known as the "French Mission Building". In 1953, it was sold back to the Hong Kong Government.

From 23 August 1945 to April 1946 the building was used by the provisional Government of Hong Kong following the end of Japanese occupation of Hong Kong.

When the Society of Jesus were expelled from Canton in 1949, it moved its St. Ignatius Language School to Hong Kong where it was housed in the top floor of the building, together with accommodation for Joseph Mallin of the Society.

It was then used successively by the Education Department, the Victoria District Court (1965–1980), the Supreme Court (1980–1983), and the Government Information Services (starting from 1987). It has been used as the Court of Final Appeal since the inception of the Court at the time of the transfer of sovereignty over Hong Kong, on 1 July 1997. On 7 September 2015, the court moved to the Old Supreme Court Building.

== Conservation ==
The building was declared a monument on September 14, 1989. It was decided in 2011 that it would be made available for adaptive reuse after the relocation of the Court of Final Appeal to the Old Supreme Court Building.

== See also ==
- Béthanie, a building built in 1875 by the Paris Foreign Missions Society in Pok Fu Lam

Preceded by none	Home of the Legislative Council of Hong Kong; 1843 – 1846	Succeeded by Caine Road (1846-?)
Preceded by Established	Home of the Court of Final Appeal of Hong Kong; 1997 – 2015	Succeeded by Old Supreme Court Building
