= Rodney (name) =

Rodney is a toponymic surname derived from the ancient name of the islands off the coast of Sweden previously called Roden, now Roslagen, near Stockholm. In 1138, Walter De Rodeney accompanied Empress Maude from Normandy in her bid for the English crown during the period known as The Anarchy. Walter was awarded the manor of Backwell near Somersetshire for his support against King Stephen. The De Rodeney surname, literally "of the Roden Islands" was shortened to Rodney in the 1300s.

Rodney became a title of the peerage of Great Britain in 1782, as Baron Rodney. Secondarily, it came to be used as a given name in the 18th century, originally in honour of Admiral George Brydges Rodney, 1st Baron Rodney.

== Given name ==
See also:

- Rodney (wrestler) (born 1971), American professional wrestler
- Rodney Adams (born 1994), American football player
- Rodney Alcala (1943–2021), convicted American rapist and serial killer
- Rodney Allison (born 1956), American football coach
- Rodney Anderson (Wyoming politician) (born 1931), American politician
- Rodney Anderson (born 1968), American politician
- Rodney Anderson (American football) (born 1996), American football player
- Rodney Anoaʻi (1966–2000), American professional wrestler better known as Yokozuna and member of Anoaʻi family
- Rodney Ansell (1954–1999), Australian man who inspired the "Crocodile" Dundee films
- Rodney Atkins (born 1969), an American country singer
- Boss Bailey (born 1979), an American football linebacker whose real name is Rodney
- Rodney Bailey (born 1979), an American football player
- Rodney Begnaud (born 1973), American professional wrestler
- Rodney Bewes (1937–2017), English actor
- Rodney Bingenheimer (born 1946), radio disc jockey
- Rod Bonella (1945/46–2000), Australian long-distance runner and horse trainer
- Rod Carew (born 1945), Panamanian-American baseball player
- Rodney Carrington (born 1968), comedian and star of Rodney (TV series)
- Rodney Caston (born 1977), American writer
- Rodney Charles (born 1950), Trinidadian politician
- Rodney Clavell, former South Australian corrections officer and prisoner at Yatala Labour Prison
- Rodney Cloete, Namibian politician
- Rodney Collin (1909–1956), British writer
- Rodney Craig (born 1945), British fencer
- Rodney Dangerfield (1921–2004), American comedian
- Rodney Dunham (born 2008), American football player
- Rodney Eastman (born 1967), Canadian actor
- Rodney Fields Jr. (born 2004), American football player
- Rodney Fox (born 1940), Australian film maker and shark attack survivor
- Rodney Frelinghuysen (born 1946), U.S. Representative from New Jersey
- Rodney Godshall (1944–2025), American operatic bass
- Rodney A. Hawes, Jr. (born 1939), American business executive and philanthropist
- Rodney Howard-Browne (born 1961), South African, American Evangelist
- Rodney Jack (born 1972), St. Vincent football player
- Rodney Jenkins (1944–2024), American equestrian
- Rodney Jerkins (born 1977), American record producer, rapper, and songwriter
- Rodney Kageyama (1941–2018), American actor
- Rodney King (1965–2012), African-American whose beating by the LAPD sparked race riots in Los Angeles, California
- Rodney Linderman (born 1963), better known as Rodney Anonymous, of the Dead Milkmen
- Rodney MacDonald (born 1972), Canadian politician and former Premier of Nova Scotia
- Rod McKuen (1933–2015), American singer, poet
- Rodney Marks (1968–2000), Australian astrophysicist
- Rodney Marsh (footballer) (born 1944), English footballer
- Rod Marsh (1947–2022), Australian cricketer
- Rodney Matthews (born 1945), English artist and illustrator
- Rodney Mazion (born 1971), American football and baseball player
- Rodney McGraw (born 2002), American football player
- Rodney Mullen (born 1966), professional skateboarder
- Rodney Needham (1923–2006), British social anthropologist
- Rodney Porter (1917–1985), English biochemist
- Rodney Price (born 1972), Jamaican artist
- Rodney Reed (born 1967), American death row inmate
- Rodney Rowland (born 1964), American actor
- Rodney Scott (actor) (born 1978), American actor
- Rodney Scott (baseball) (born 1953), American baseball player
- Rodney Scott (pitmaster) (born 1971), American chef and whole hog barbecue pitmaster
- Rodney Seaborn (1912−2008), Australian psychiatrist and performing arts philanthropist
- Rodney Shelley (born 2002), American football player
- Rodney Sikumba (born 1980), Zambian politician
- Roots Manuva (born 1972), English rapper, real name Rodney Hylton Smith
- Rodney Stuckey (born 1986), American basketball player
- Rodney Vandergert (1935–2009), Sri Lankan diplomat
- Rod Wallace (born 1969), English footballer
- Rodney Wallace (American football) (1949–2013), American football offensive lineman
- Rodney Wallace (fighter) (born 1981), American professional mixed martial arts fighter
- Rodney Wallace (footballer) (born 1988), Costa Rican footballer for New York City FC
- Rodney Wallace (Massachusetts politician) (1823–1903), U.S. Representative from Massachusetts
- Rodney Warnakula (born 1961), Sri Lankan actor
- Rodney Williams (disambiguation), multiple people

== Surnames ==
- Brenda Solzano-Rodney (born 1962), West Indian cricketer
- Caesar Rodney (1728–1784), lawyer and signer of the Declaration of Independence from Delaware
- Caesar A. Rodney (1772–1824), lawyer and U.S. Senator from Delaware
- Caleb Rodney (1767–1840), merchant and Governor of Delaware
- Daniel Rodney (1764–1846), merchant, Governor and U.S. Senator from Delaware
- Fernando Rodney (born 1977), relief pitcher for the Washington Nationals
- George B. Rodney (1803–1883), lawyer and U.S. Representative from Delaware
- George B. Rodney, Jr. (1842–1927) Governor of Alaska and U.S. Army officer
- George Brydges Rodney, 1st Baron Rodney (1718–1792), admiral in the British Royal Navy
- George Rodney, 2nd Baron Rodney (1753–1802)
- George Rodney, 3rd Baron Rodney (1782–1842)
- Sir John Rodney (13??-1400)
- Spencer Rodney, 5th Baron Rodney (1785–1846)
- Thomas Rodney (1744–1811), lawyer and Continental Congressman from Delaware
- Walter Rodney (1942–1980), Guyanese historian and politician

== Fictional characters ==
- Rodney, a hamster villager in Animal Crossing: New Leaf and New Horizons
- Rodney Copperbottom, character in the movie Robots
- Rodney McKay, character in science fiction television series Stargate Atlantis
- Rodney Trotter, character in British sitcom Only Fools and Horses
- Rodney J. Squirrel, one of the main characters from Squirrel Boy
- Rodney Ford, character from manga and anime series Element Hunters
- Rodney Stone, the narrator of boxing novel Rodney Stone by Arthur Conan Doyle
- Rodney Wilson, a character in the 2012 American comedy movie Wanderlust
- Rodney, character from Total Drama: Pahkitew Island
- Sir Rodney, character in the American comic strip The Wizard of Id

== See also ==
- Rodney (disambiguation)
- Rondey Robinson (born 1967), American professional basketball player
