= Rodney Street, Hong Kong =

Street in Admiralty, Hong Kong

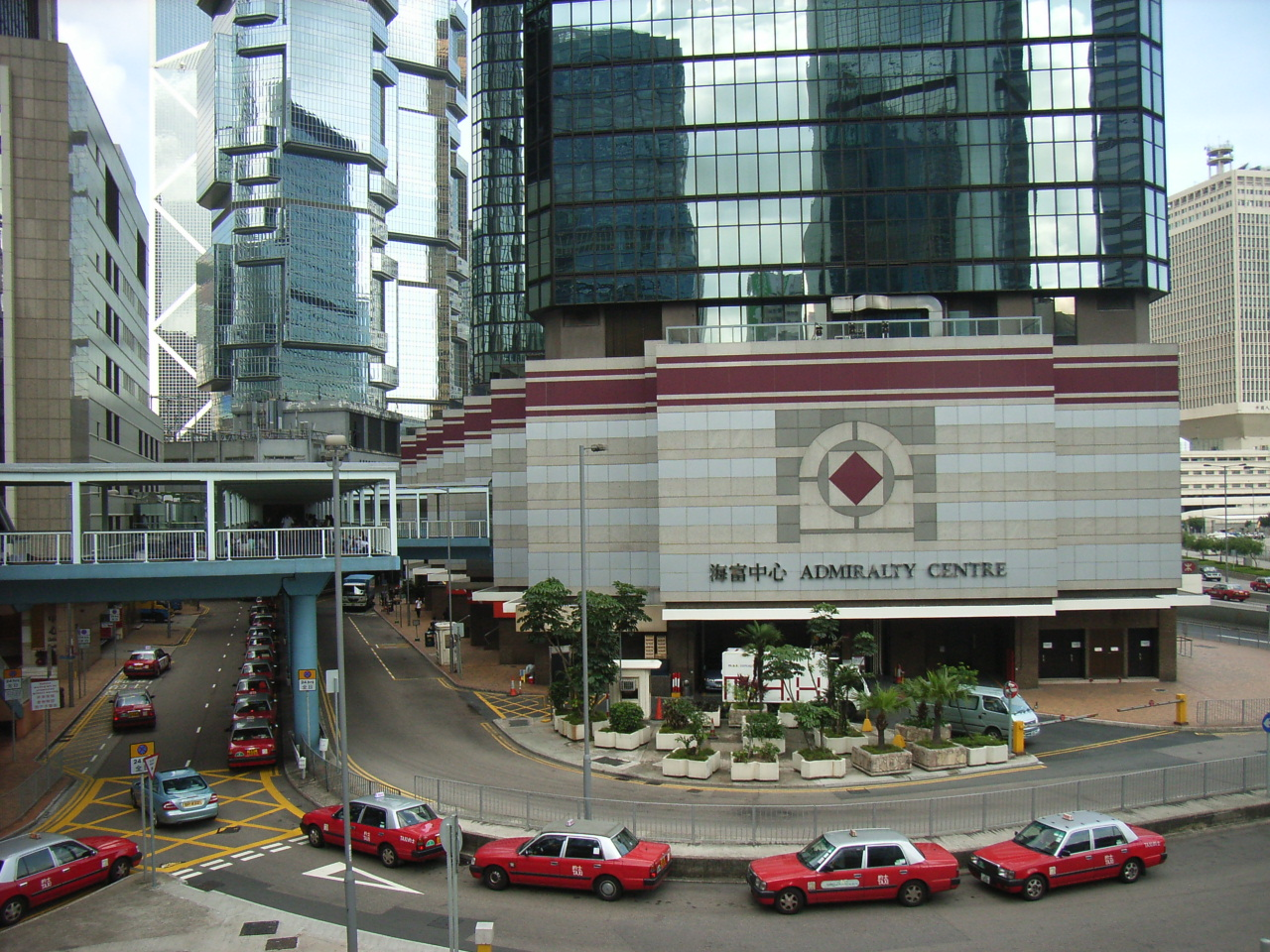
Intersection of Rodney Street and Drake Street in May 2006

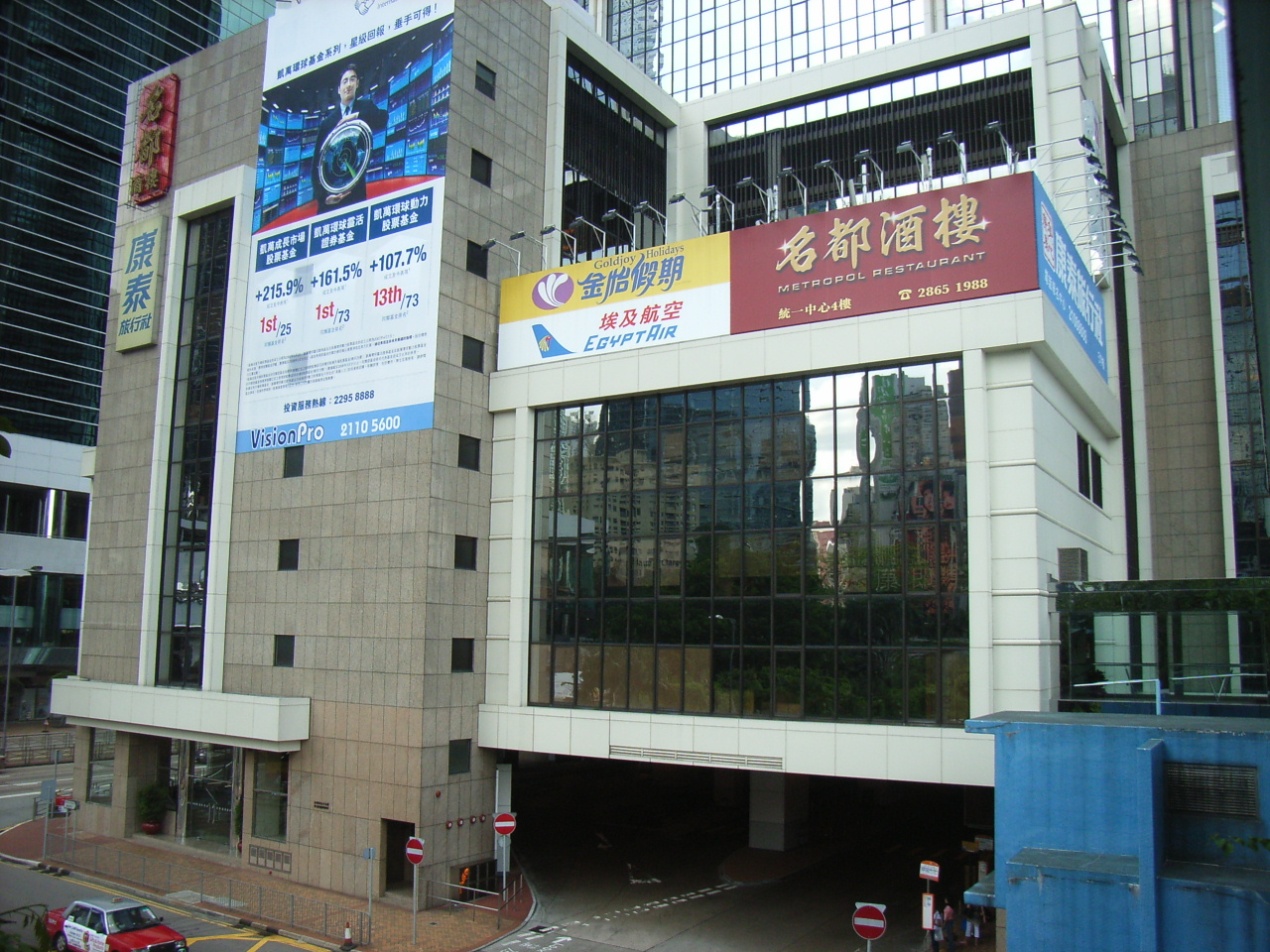
The facade of United Centre facing Rodney Street in May 2006

Rodney Street (Chinese: 樂禮街) is a street in Admiralty East, Central and Western District, Hong Kong. It connects with Queensway in the south and Harcourt Road in the north, but the northbound direction is divided at the junction with Derby Street, and vehicles cannot drive directly from Queensway to Harcourt Road.

== Namesake ==
The name Rodney Street comes from HMS Rodney as Admiralty was once the Naval Dockyard Admiralty Dock, the headquarters of British Navy in Hong Kong. Rodney comes from Baron Rodney, in which the famous is George Brydges Rodney, 1st Baron Rodney in the 18th century.

== Nearby Sights ==
- United Centre
- Admiralty Centre
- Queensway
- Harcourt Road
- Harcourt Garden

== Transport ==
- Admiralty (East) Public Transport Interchange
- Admiralty (Rodney Street) Bus Terminus
- Admiralty station (MTR)
