= Robert Rodney, 6th Baron Rodney =

British soldier, landowner and peer

Robert Dennett Rodney, 6th Baron Rodney (21 May 1820 – 19 August 1864) was a British soldier, landowner, and peer, a member of the House of Lords from 1846 until his death.

Rodney was the son of Captain Robert Rodney and his wife Anne Dennett. On 23 November 1838 he purchased a commission as ensign and lieutenant in the Scots Guards. He retired from the Army on 23 February 1844. On 15 May 1846 he succeeded an uncle, Spencer Rodney, 5th Baron Rodney, as Baron Rodney and as a baronet, inheriting a seat in the Lords and a landed estate. In July 1848, Rodney was appointed a deputy lieutenant of Herefordshire.

On 3 August 1850, Rodney married Sarah Singleton, daughter of John Singleton, and they had three children:

- Patience Annie Rodney (died 1918)
- George Bridges Harley Dennett Rodney, later 7th Baron (1857–1909)
- Robert William Henry Rodney (1858–1933)

In May 1860, he was commissioned captain of the 6th Herefordshire (Leominster) Company of Rifle Volunteers. He served for less than a year, resigning on 3 April 1861.

Rodney died on 19 August 1864 aged 44, and was succeeded in his peerage and estates by his seven-year-old eldest son.

== Notes ==
Peerage of Great Britain
| Preceded by Spencer Rodney | Baron Rodney; 1846–1864 | Succeeded by George Brydges Harley Dennett Rodney |
