= Rodney Street =

Rodney Street is a street in the following cities:

- Rodney Street, Liverpool, in Liverpool, England
- Rodney Street, Hong Kong (樂禮街), in Admiralty, Hong Kong
- Rodney Street, Brooklyn, a frontage road to the Brooklyn-Queens Expressway in New York City
