= John Rodney, 9th Baron Rodney =

British soldier, businessman and peer

John Francis Rodney, 9th Baron Rodney of Rodney Stoke (28 June 1920 – 13 October 1992) was a British soldier, business man, and peer, a member of the House of Lords from 1973 until his death.

Educated at Stowe School and McGill University in Canada, he was the younger son of George Rodney, 8th Baron Rodney, and his wife Lady Marjorie Lowther, a daughter of Lancelot Lowther, 6th Earl of Lonsdale. An older brother, George William Rodney (1918–1942), died on active service.

In the Second World War, Rodney saw active service in the Burma campaign and was mentioned in despatches while a Lieutenant in the Commandos. He worked for Rootes Ltd between 1946 and 1952, when he became marketing director of Vacumatic Ltd. He succeeded as Baron Rodney (1782) and as a baronet on 18 December 1973. In 1976 he was chairman of the British Printing Machinery Association.

While a member of the House of Lords he served as an Alternate Delegate to the Parliamentary Assembly of the Council of Europe.

On 3 November 1951, Rodney married Régine Elisabeth Lucienne Jeanne Thérèse Marie Ghislaine d'Opdorp, daughter of Chevalier Robert Egide Marie Ghislain Pangaert d'Opdorp, and they had two children, George Rodney, 10th Baron Rodney (1953–2011) and Anne Rodney (born 1955).

He died on 13 October 1992, aged 72, in Kensington.

== Notes ==
Peerage of Great Britain
Preceded by George Rodney	Baron Rodney; 1973–1992	Succeeded by George Rodney
