= Admiralty station (MTR) =

MTR interchange station on Hong Kong Island

Admiralty 金鐘
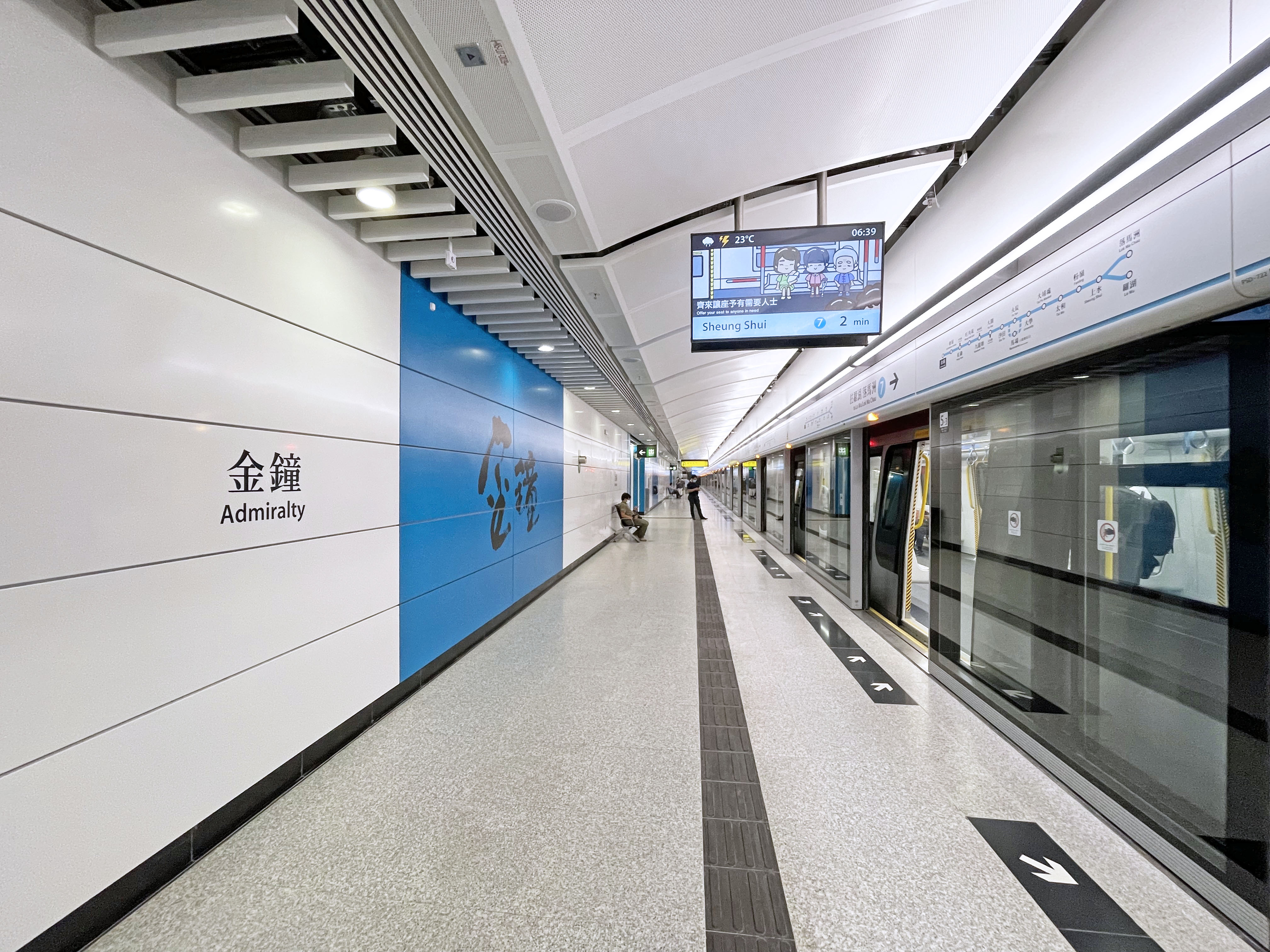
- Platform 7 of Admiralty station

Chinese name
- Traditional Chinese: 金鐘
- Simplified Chinese: 金钟
- Jyutping: gam^{1} zung^{1}
- Cantonese Yale: Gāmjūng
- Literal meaning: Golden Bell
Transcriptions
Standard Mandarin
- Hanyu Pinyin: Jīnzhōng
Yue: Cantonese
- Yale Romanization: Gāmjūng
- Jyutping: gam^{1} zung^{1}

General information
- Location: Drake Street × Tamar Street, Admiralty; Central and Western District, Hong Kong
- Coordinates: 22°16′44″N 114°09′53″E
- System: MTR rapid transit station
- Owner: Tsuen Wan line, Island line, South Island line: MTR Corporation; East Rail line: KCR Corporation
- Operator: MTR Corporation
- Lines: Tsuen Wan line; Island line; East Rail line; South Island line
- Platforms: 8 (4 island platforms)
- Tracks: 8
- Connections: Bus, minibus; Tram; Peak Tram

Construction
- Structure type: Underground
- Depth: 43 m (141 ft)
- Platform levels: 3
- Accessible: Yes

Other information
- Station code: ADM

History
- Opened: Tsuen Wan line : 12 February 1980; 46 years ago; Island line : 31 May 1985; 41 years ago; South Island line : 28 December 2016; 9 years ago; East Rail line : 15 May 2022; 4 years ago
- Opening: 12 February 1980

Services
Preceding station	MTR	Following station
Central Terminus	Tsuen Wan line	Tsim Sha Tsui towards Tsuen Wan
Central towards Kennedy Town	Island line	Wan Chai towards Chai Wan
Terminus	East Rail line	Exhibition Centre towards Lo Wu or Lok Ma Chau
Terminus	South Island line	Ocean Park towards South Horizons
Track layout
L2/L3 (Upper platforms)
L5 (Middle platforms)
L6 (Lower platforms)
Location
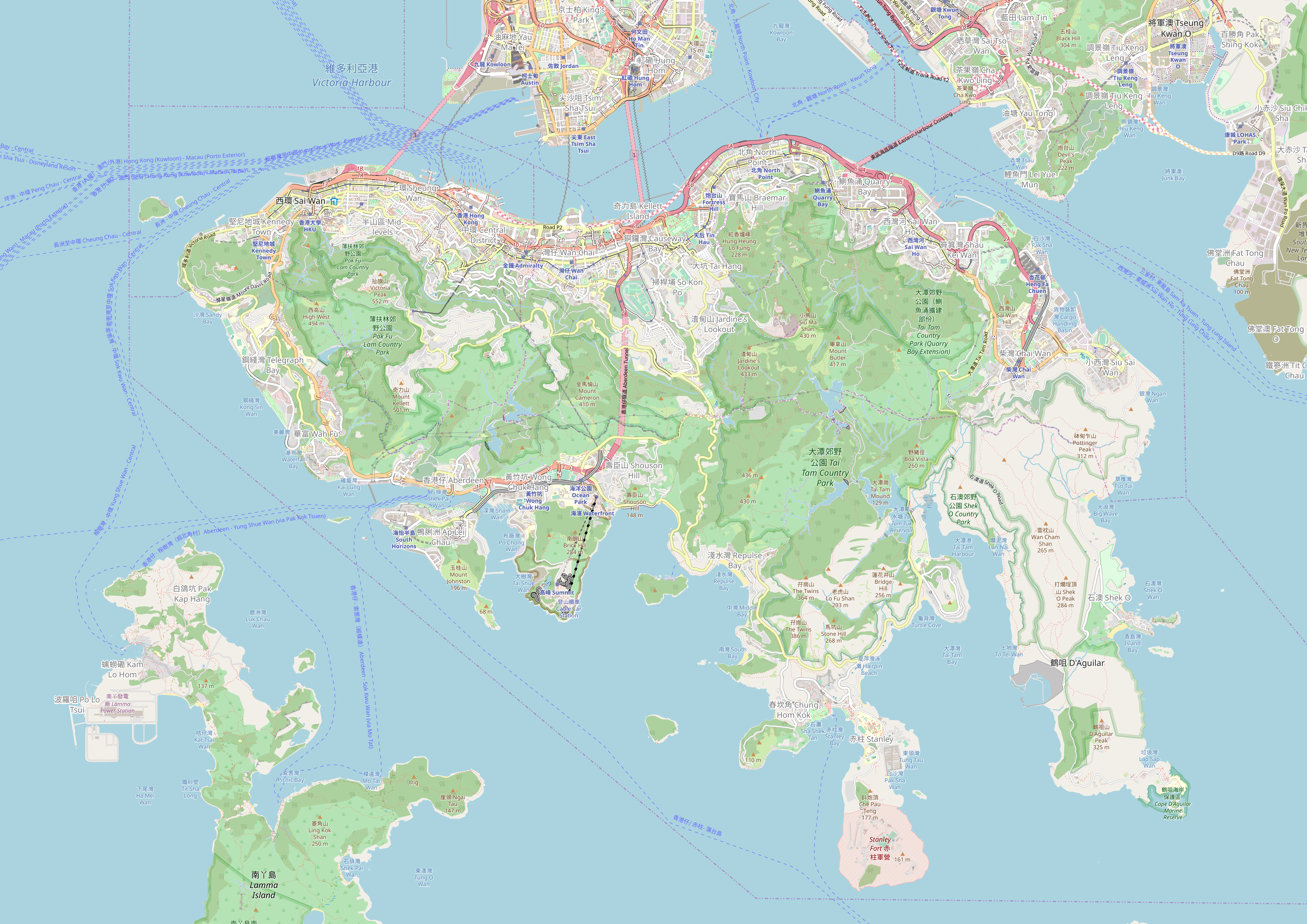
- Location within MTR Location within Hong Kong urban core Location within Hong Kong Island

Admiralty (Chinese: 金鐘; Jyutping: gam^{1} zung^{1}; Cantonese Yale: Gāmjūng) is an MTR station in Admiralty, Hong Kong. The station's livery is blue and white. It is a major interchange station within the MTR network, being served by the most lines of any station, at four: the East Rail line, the Tsuen Wan line, the Island line, and the South Island line.

The station and surrounding area are named after HMS Tamar, once the headquarters of the Royal Navy in Hong Kong. It was built on the former site of the naval dockyards, which were built in 1878 and demolished in the 1970s.

Between 2011 and 2016, the station underwent major expansion to accommodate two new sets of platforms underneath the original structure to serve two more MTR lines, the South Island line and the East Rail line (part of the Sha Tin to Central Link project). The South Island line opened in 2016, while the East Rail line platforms opened in 2022. Accommodating over 100,000 passengers per peak hour, Admiralty has since become the busiest station in the MTR network.

== History ==
=== Development and construction ===
The government gave the MTR Corporation first refusal on the 60,000-square-foot (5,600 m^{2}) site, which was sold to it in 1976 for around HK$200 million for cash and equity consideration.

The Admiralty Centre, United Centre and Queensway Plaza commercial buildings formed part of the development, and sit directly above the station.

On 12 February 1980, the segment of the Kwun Tong line between Central and Tsim Sha Tsui was opened. At the time, Admiralty and Central stations were the only two MTR stations on Hong Kong Island. The platforms began serving the Tsuen Wan line on 17 May 1982.

Admiralty was designed to be a transfer station with the then-planned Island line. On 31 May 1985, the first phase of the Island line (between Admiralty and Chai Wan) opened, with Admiralty the temporary western terminus of the Island line. To facilitate cross-platform interchange, the Central- and Chai Wan-bound platforms were located on a very wide island platform on the lower level, while the Tsuen Wan-bound and termination platforms shared another very wide island platform on the upper level. When the second part of the Island line (Admiralty to Sheung Wan) opened in 1986, the termination platform became the Sheung Wan-bound platform, while the other platforms remained unchanged. In 2014, the Sheung Wan-bound platform became the Kennedy Town-bound platform.

=== 2004 arson attack ===
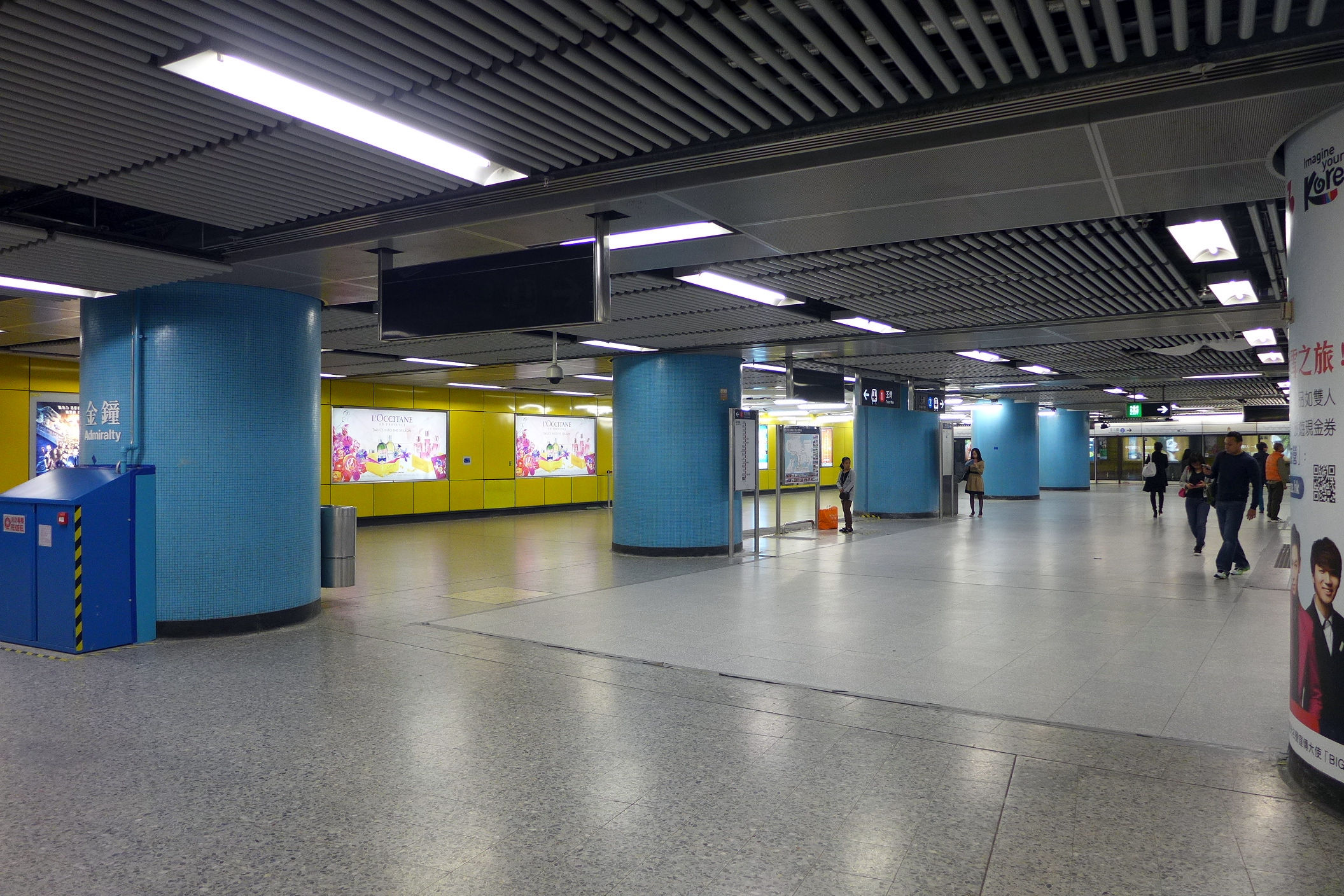
The platforms are wide enough for a very large number of passengers to change trains at the same time.

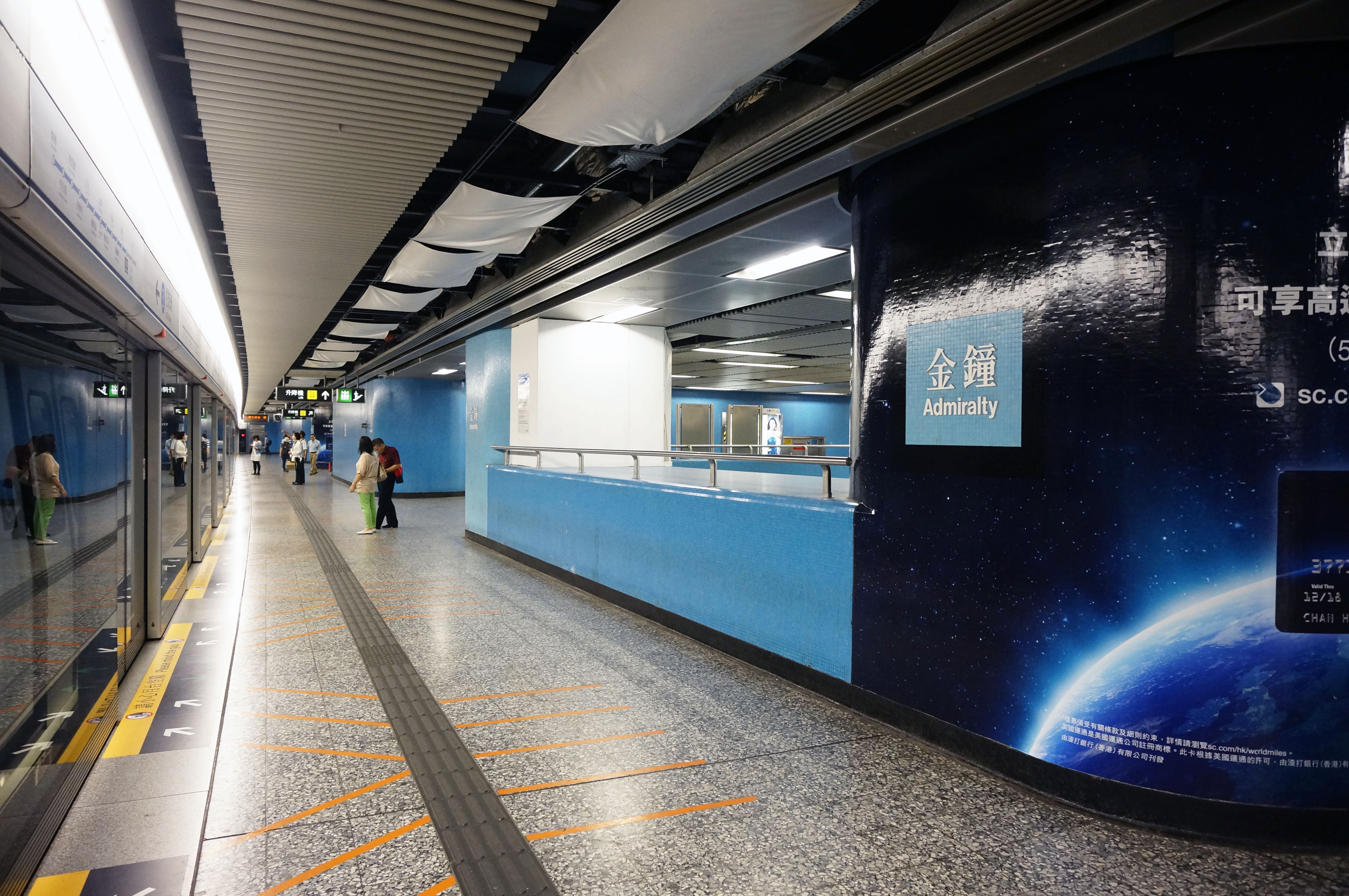
Platform livery before the platform renovation around 2016

At 9:14 a.m. on 5 January 2004, 14 passengers suffered minor injuries when a 55-year-old man suffering from delusional disorder ignited two gas cylinders full of paint thinner in the first train car of a Central-bound train from Tsim Sha Tsui. The driver decided to complete the journey and passengers were evacuated from the train in Admiralty.

=== Station expansion and new lines ===
Admiralty station was expanded to serve two additional lines – the South Island line on level L6 and the East Rail line on level L5.

The South Island line platforms opened on 28 December 2016, after a public open day on 24th of that month, giving residents in the Southern District quicker access to Hong Kong Island's central business district. The opening date was delayed from 2015 due to technical problems in the deep tunnels for the new platforms. During the Central Station crash, Admiralty was the southern terminus of the Tsuen Wan line. The East Rail line began servicing Admiralty on 15 May 2022, allowing commuters from the northeast New Territories to travel directly to Admiralty.

A new single level underground transfer lobby with natural light was built to the east of the original concourse, allowing passengers to transfer to the new lines. The atrium was also expanded. The station extension, located under Harcourt Garden, incorporates 34 escalators and five lifts to integrate with the existing station. The East Rail line takes up one level under the transfer lobby, with the South Island line being directly below it. Exits E1 and E2 were rebuilt as one exit to accommodate the glass roof of the interchange concourse and has since opened. While the East Rail line tracks will have sidings for terminating trains south of the station, the South Island line tracks end at bumper blocks north of the station with no overrun track.

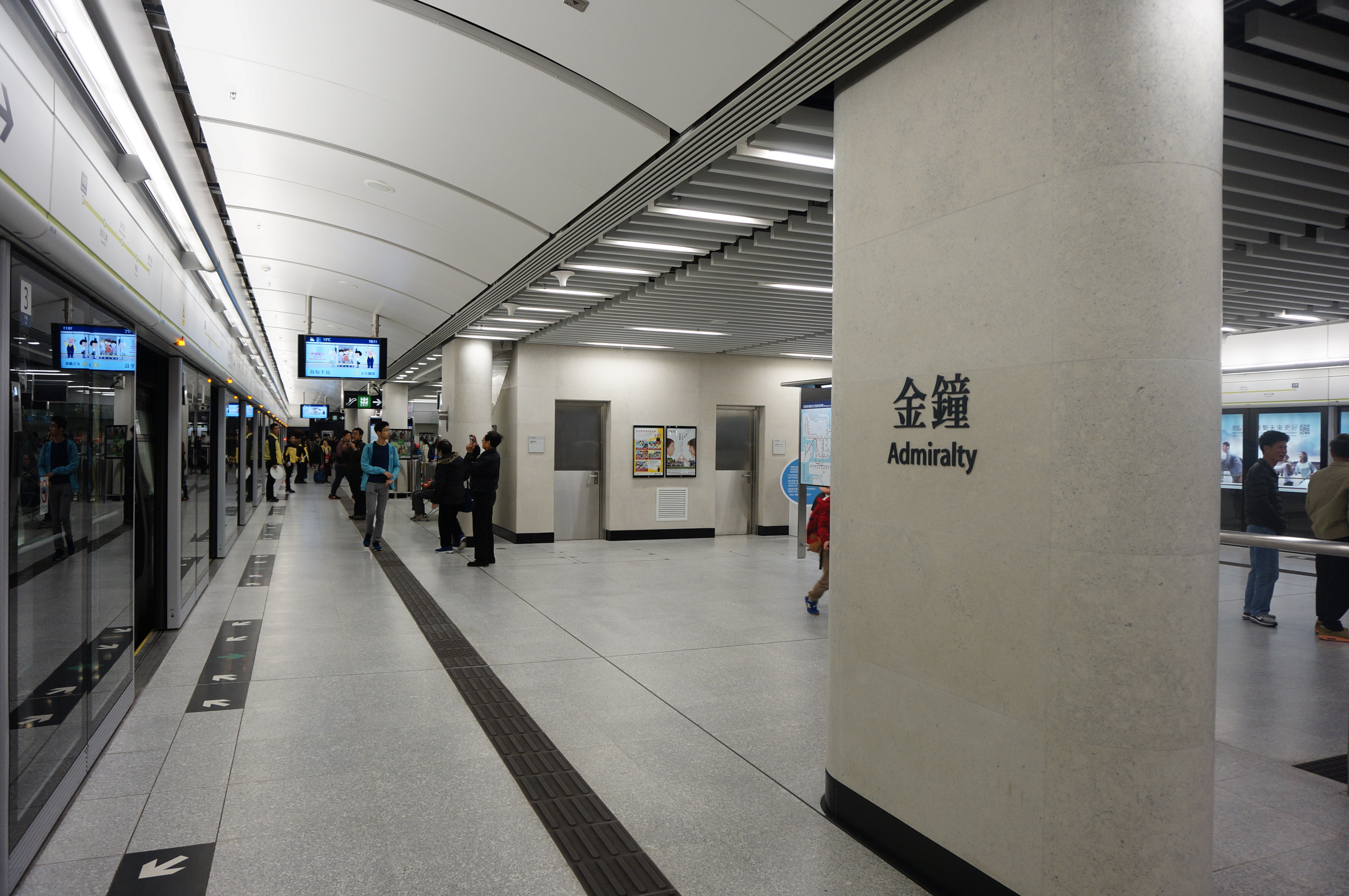
South Island line Platform 5

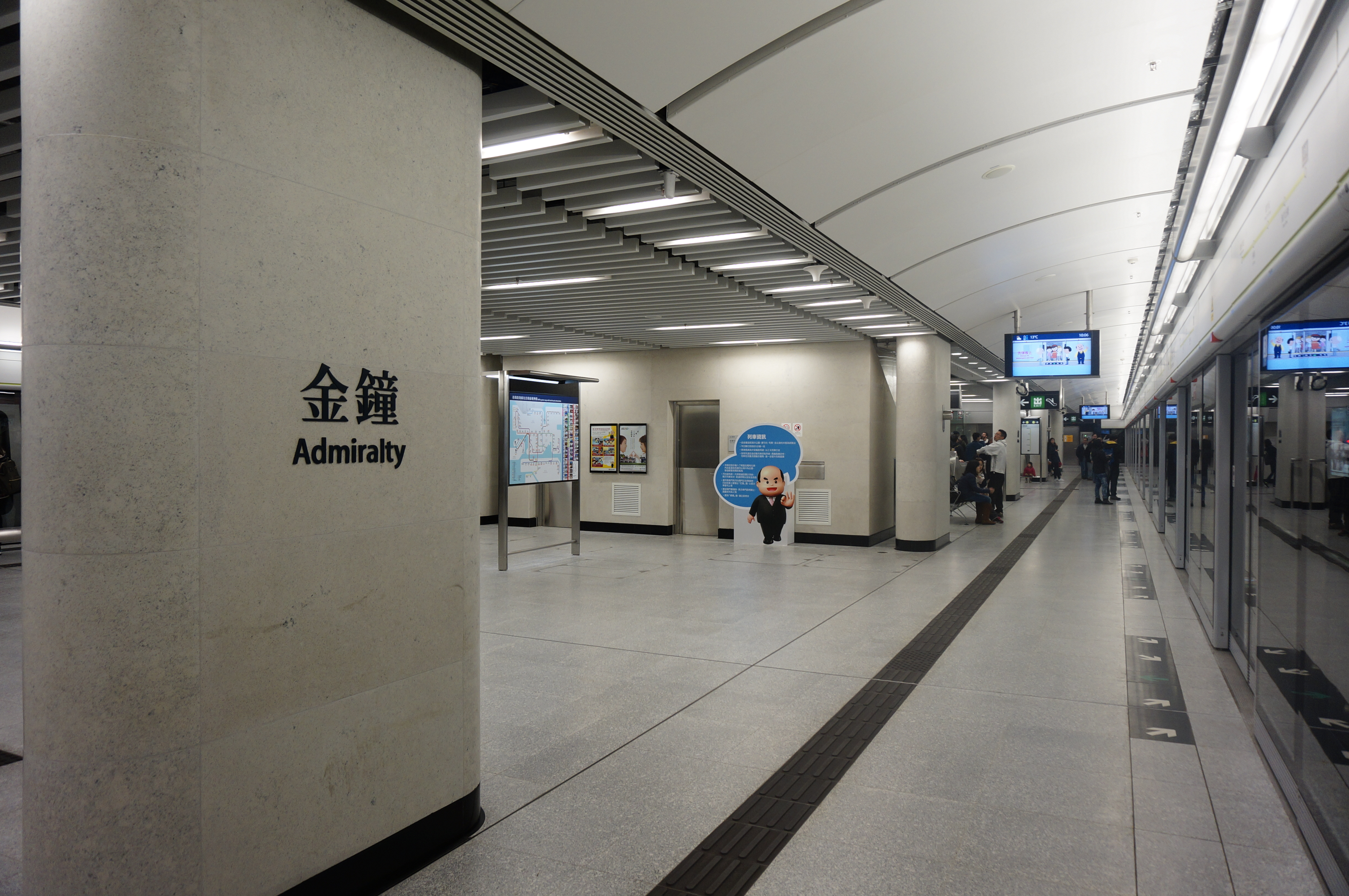
South Island line Platform 6

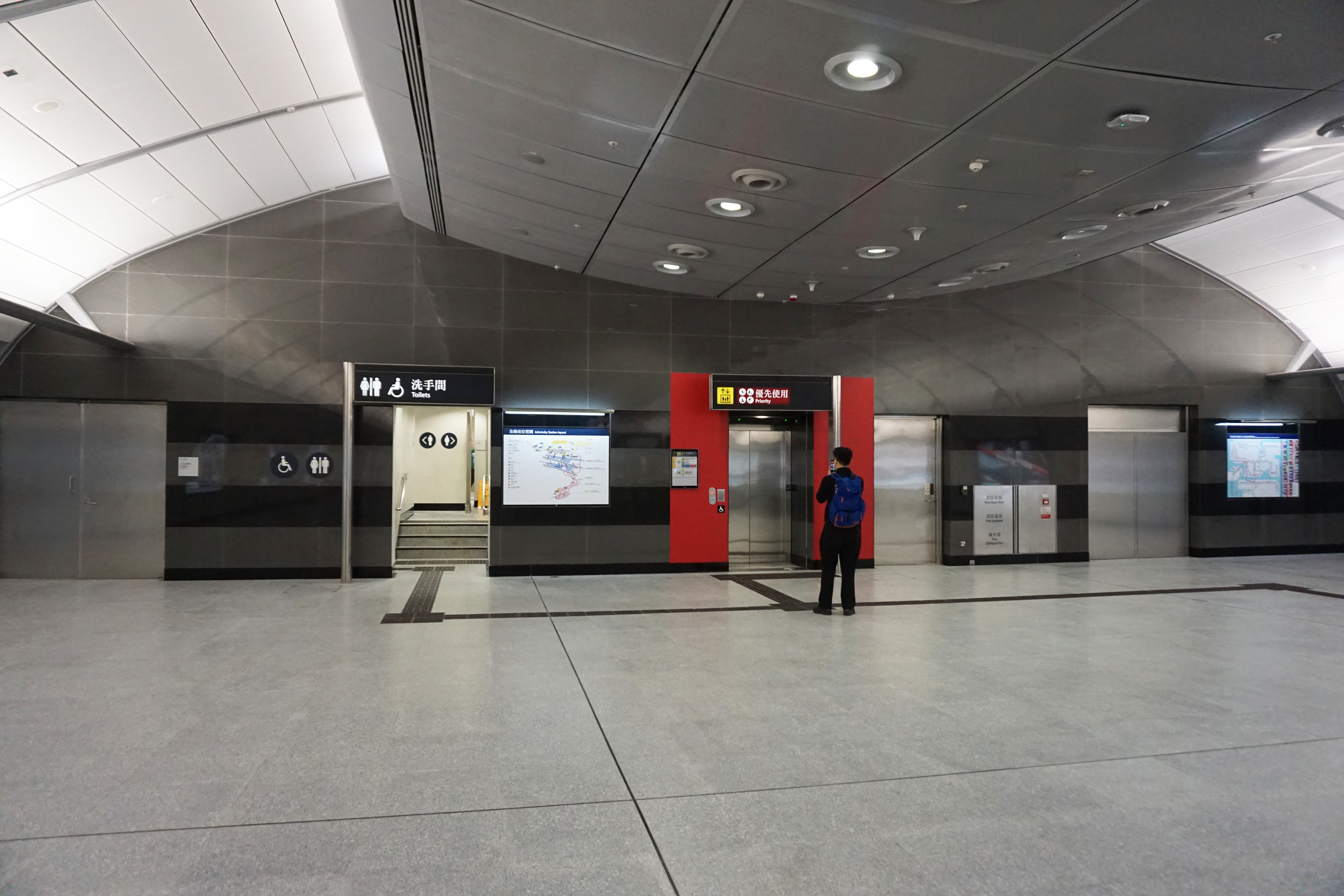
New toilets on Level 5 in paid area

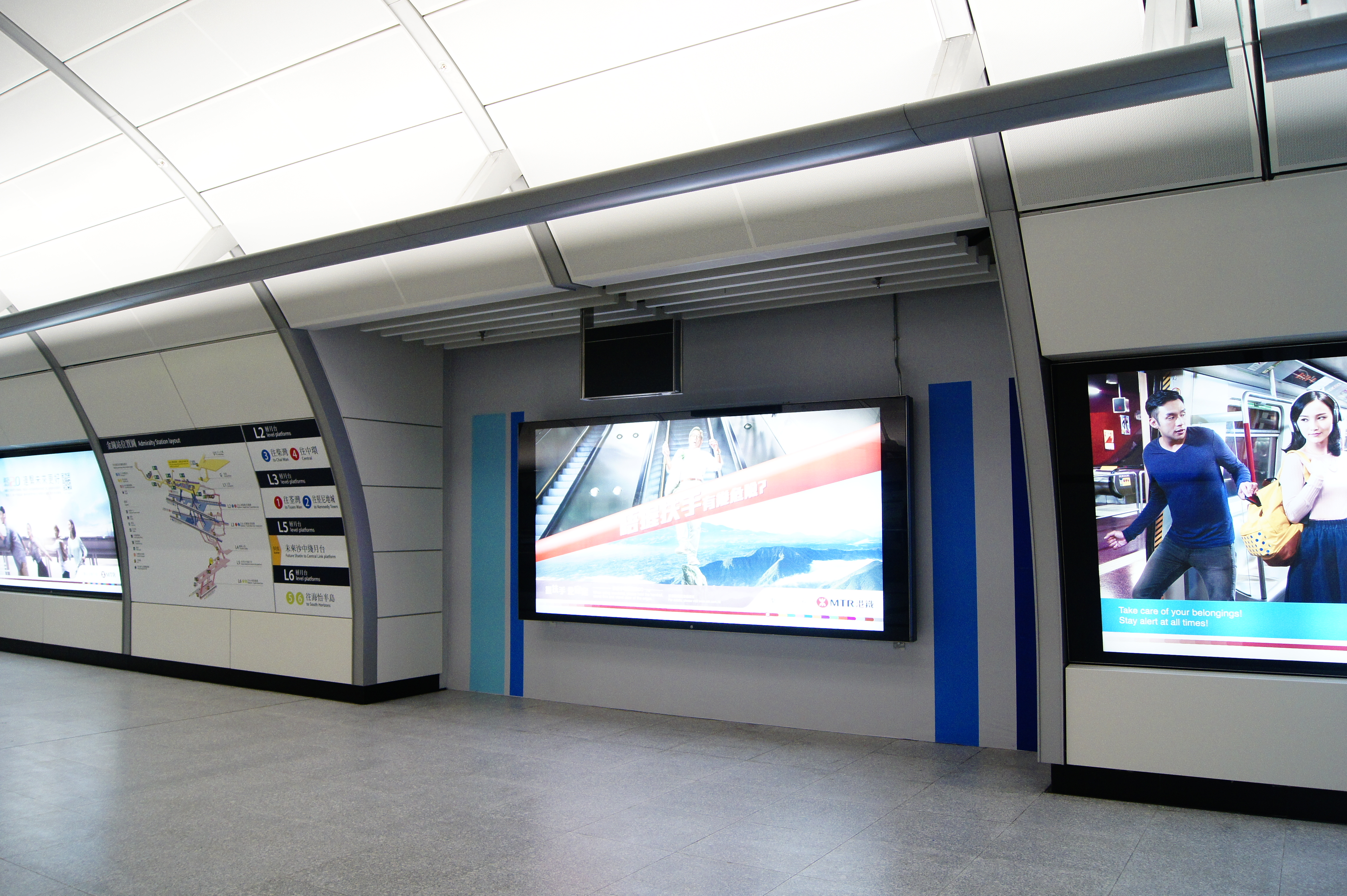
An image of when SCL platforms were still behind hoardings

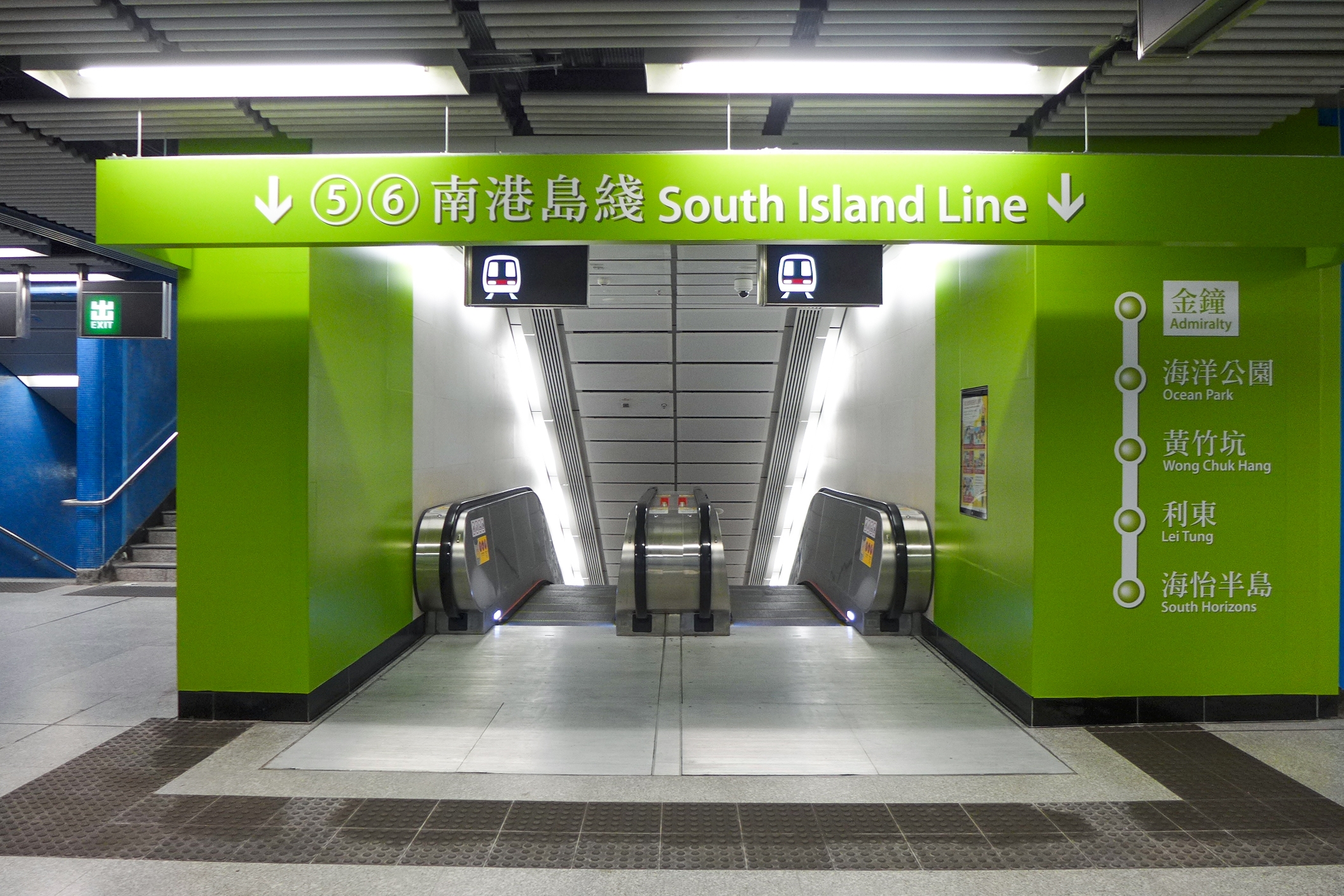
Signs directing passengers to the newly opened South Island line on its opening day (28 December 2016)

The narrowest part of the existing platforms on L3 was widened to provide better access to the first and second cars of the Tsuen Wan line trains, as well as last two cars of Island line trains. Island line passengers travelling towards Tsuen Wan now have easier access to these cars. The expansion brought new toilets in the paid area, a lift between the concourse and, ground level, and artwork in the station.

The expansion works saw the station size being expanded significantly. The number of platforms doubled from 4 to 8, the number of floors increased from 3 to 8, and the number of escalators increased from 8 to 42.

== Station layout ==
Today, Admiralty station has a total of 6 underground floors; the uppermost (L1) floor has the fare control, lobby, shops, Customer Service Centre and other major facilities.

On floor L2, passengers can access Platform 4 (Tsuen Wan line to Central) and Platform 3 (Island line to Chai Wan). One floor down, on level L3, passengers can access Platform 2 (Island line to Kennedy Town) and Platform 1 (Tsuen Wan line to Tsuen Wan). There are very wide passageways between the two platforms on each of floors L2 and L3; they are also curved platforms with trains going in opposite directions. The platforms are in the shape of a trapezium.

Because all the platforms are curved, there are large stickers in front of the platform screen doors with "Mind the gap" text, which can only be found in this station. Passengers travelling from Eastern District and Wan Chai District can walk across platform 1 to board for Tsuen Wan line trains bound for Kowloon, Kwai Chung and Tsuen Wan. Passengers travelling from Kowloon, Kwai Chung and Tsuen Wan can walk across and board the Island line trains bound for Chai Wan from platform 3.

In the extension part built to the east of the original Tsuen Wan / Island line station box, a 30 metres (98 ft) tall atrium extends 5 floors below ground. Inside the atrium, there are five escalators from floor L2 (platforms 3 and 4), and another five from L3 (platforms 1 and 2), connecting to the circulation mezzanine on floor L5 under a semi-circular skylight that brings natural light in from Rodney Street. Through floor L5—the top level of a 24 metres (79 ft) span cavern—passengers could access the East Rail line platforms sited in adjoining tunnels on the same level, or reach the South Island line platforms below, which are located 34 metres (112 ft) below ground.

South Island Line trains on floor L6 normally depart from platform 5, swapping to depart from platform 6 from 8pm onwards.

U1	Footbridge	Exit E2
G	Ground level	Exits, Public Transport Interchange
L1; Concourse	Concourse	Customer Service, MTRShops, Hang Seng Bank
L1; Concourse	Concourse	Vending machines, automatic teller machines
L1; Concourse	Concourse	MTR Travel
L1; Concourse	Concourse	Student Travel Scheme Office, MTR Lost Property Office
L2; Tsuen Wan Line & Island Line; Upper Platforms	Platform 4	← Tsuen Wan line towards Central (terminus)
L2; Tsuen Wan Line & Island Line; Upper Platforms	Island platform, doors will open on the left
L2; Tsuen Wan Line & Island Line; Upper Platforms	Platform 3	Island line towards Chai Wan (Wan Chai) →
L3; Tsuen Wan Line & Island Line; Lower Platforms	Platform 1	Tsuen Wan line towards Tsuen Wan (Tsim Sha Tsui) →
L3; Tsuen Wan Line & Island Line; Lower Platforms	Island platform, doors will open on the right
L3; Tsuen Wan Line & Island Line; Lower Platforms	Platform 2	← Island line towards Kennedy Town (Central)
L4; Transfer Lobby	Passageway	Passageway between uppermost and lowermost platforms
L5; East Rail Line; Platforms	Platform 7	East Rail line towards Lo Wu or Lok Ma Chau (Exhibition Centre) →
L5; East Rail Line; Platforms	Split platform, doors will open on the right for boarding passengers only
L5; East Rail Line; Platforms		Transfer passageway
L5; East Rail Line; Platforms	Split platform, doors will open on the right for boarding passengers only
L5; East Rail Line; Platforms	Platform 8	← East Rail line termination platform
L6; South Island Line; Platforms	Platform 6	← South Island line towards South Horizons (Ocean Park)
L6; South Island Line; Platforms	Island platform, doors will open on the left or right
L6; South Island Line; Platforms	Platform 5	← South Island line towards South Horizons (Ocean Park)

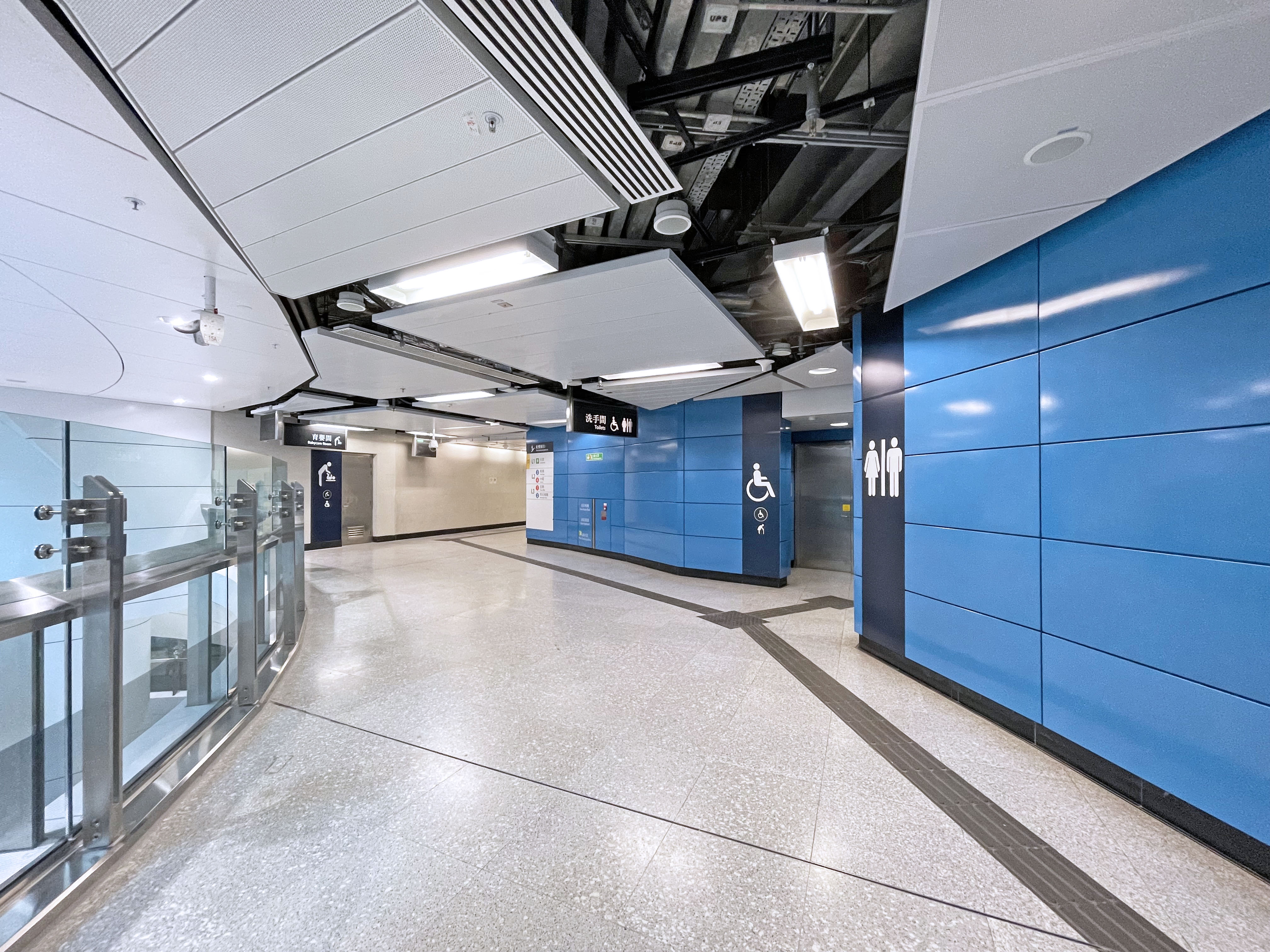
Toilets in the paid area next Exit E (May 2022)

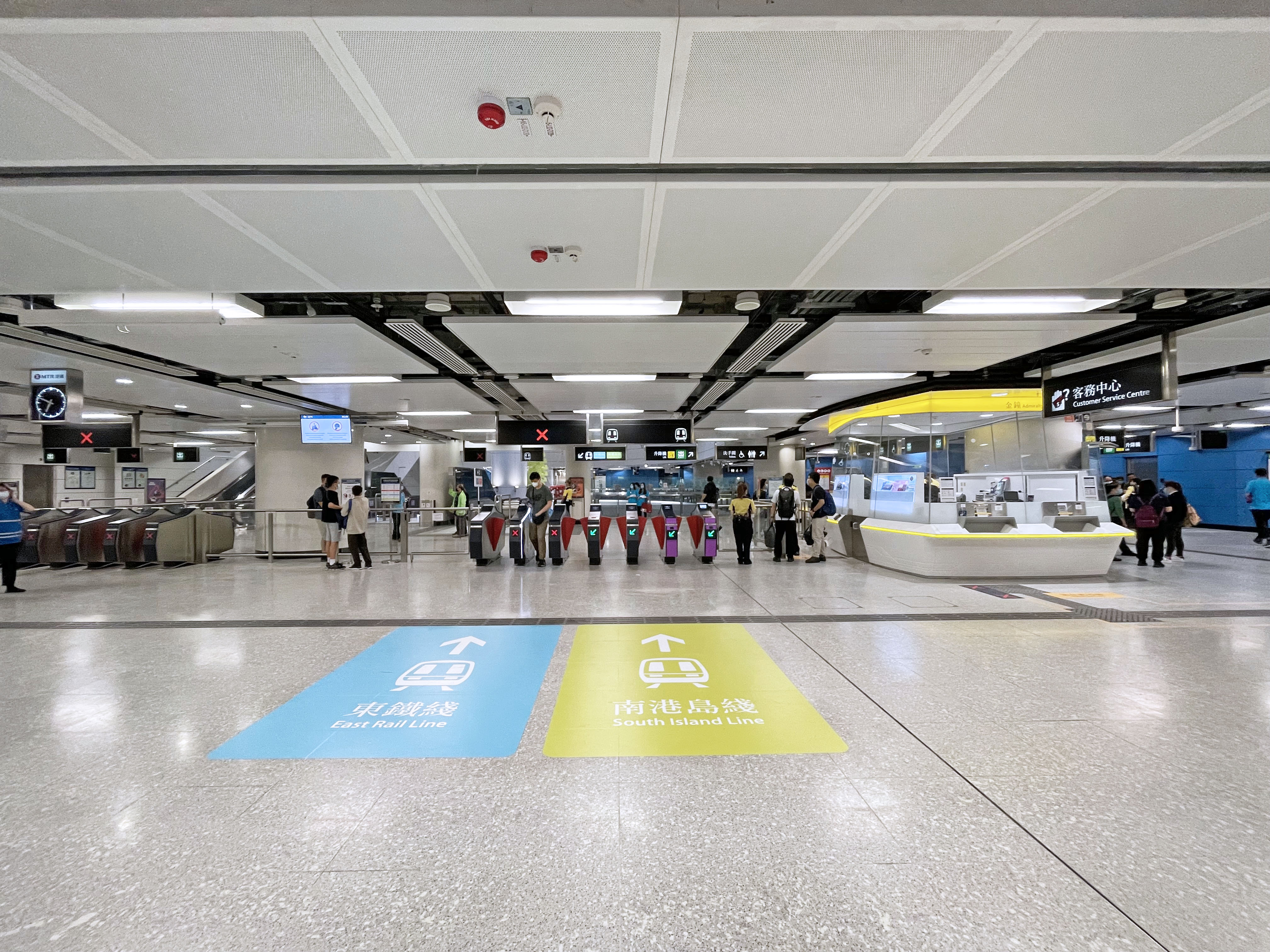
L1 Concourse, near Exit E (May 2022)

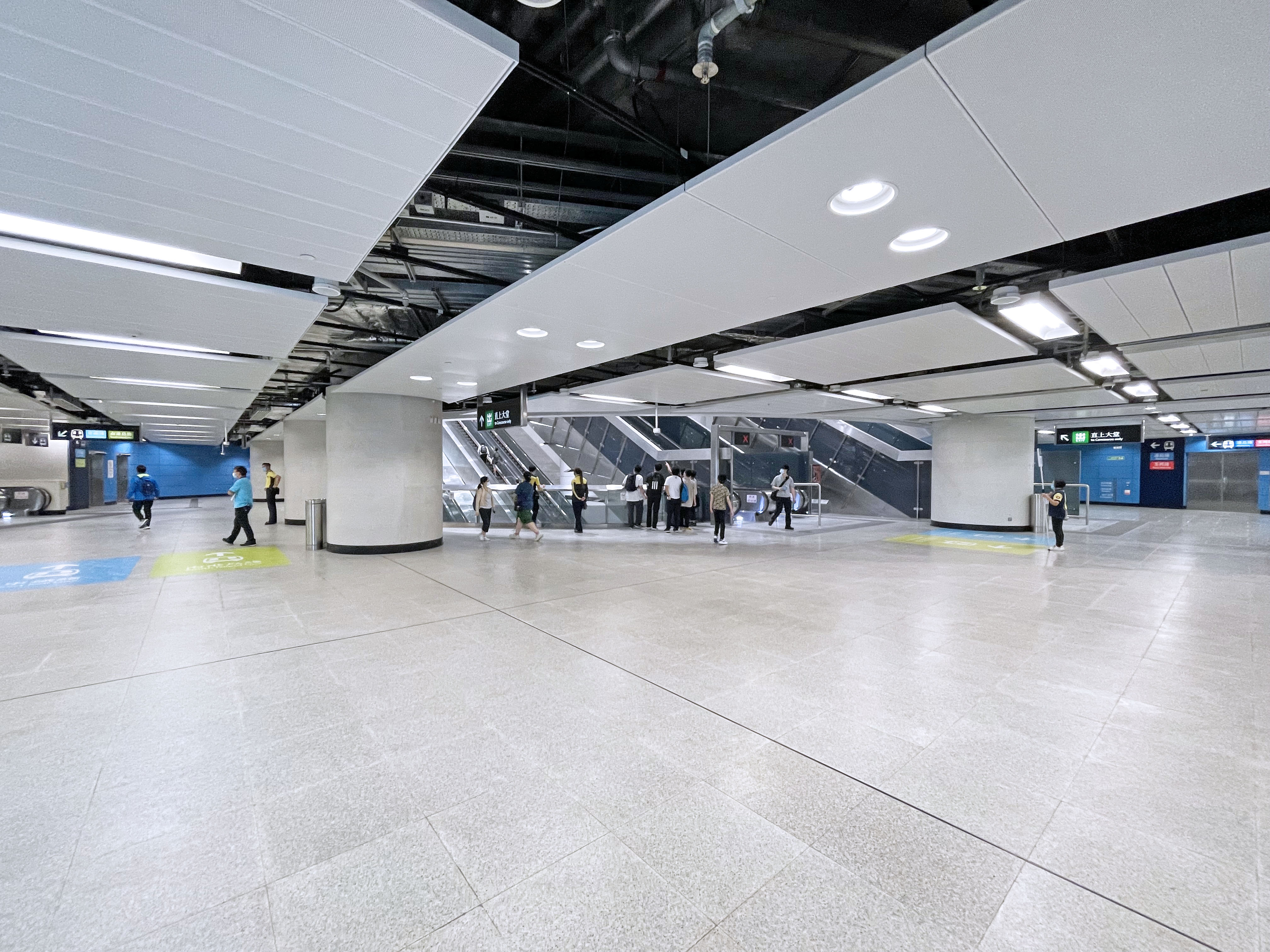
L4 level transferway escalators (May 2022)

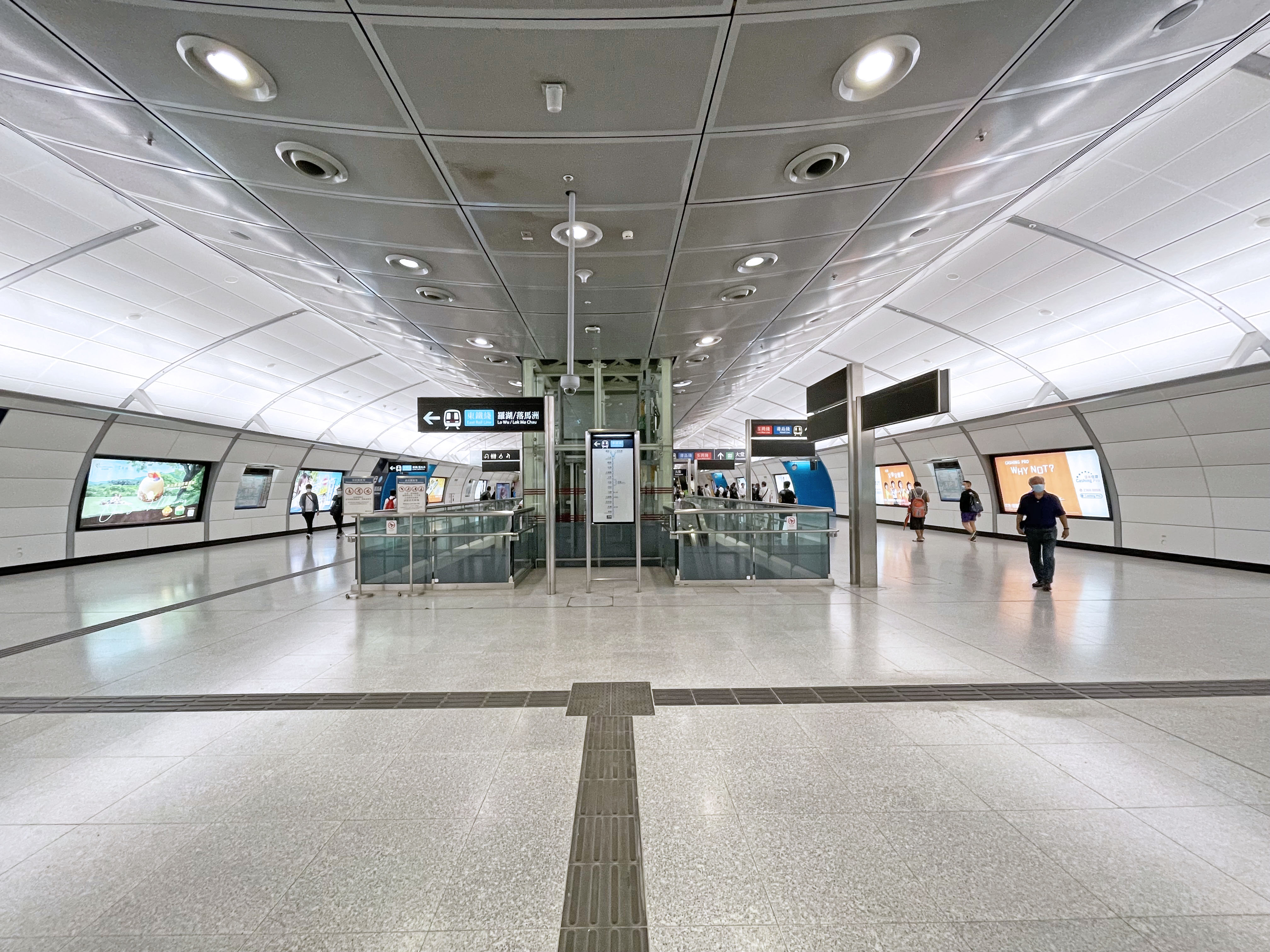
Level L5, transfer passageway between the two East Rail line platforms (May 2022)

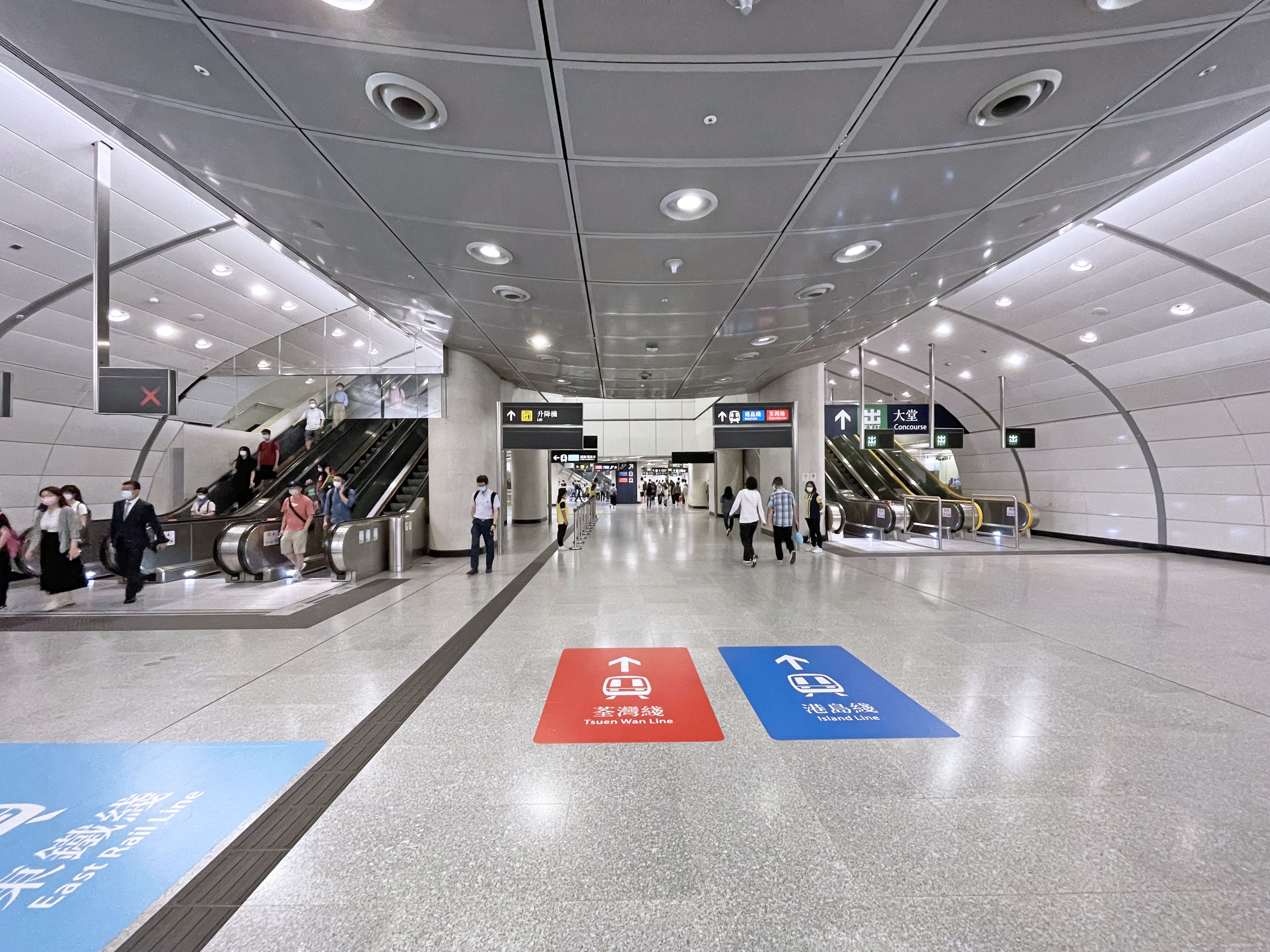
L5, signs directing passengers to the Tsuen Wan and Island line platforms (May 2022)

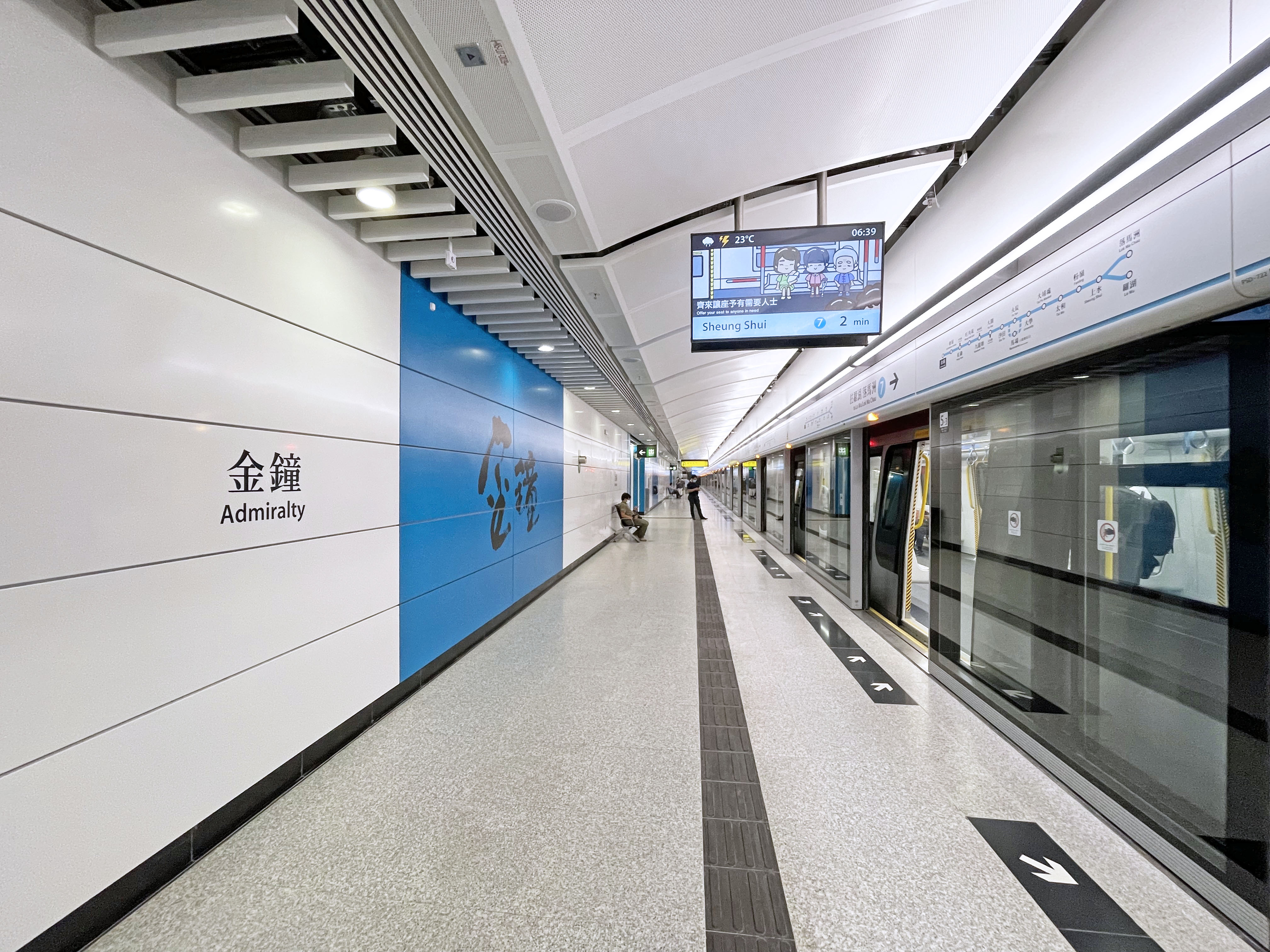
East Rail line Platform 7 (May 2022)

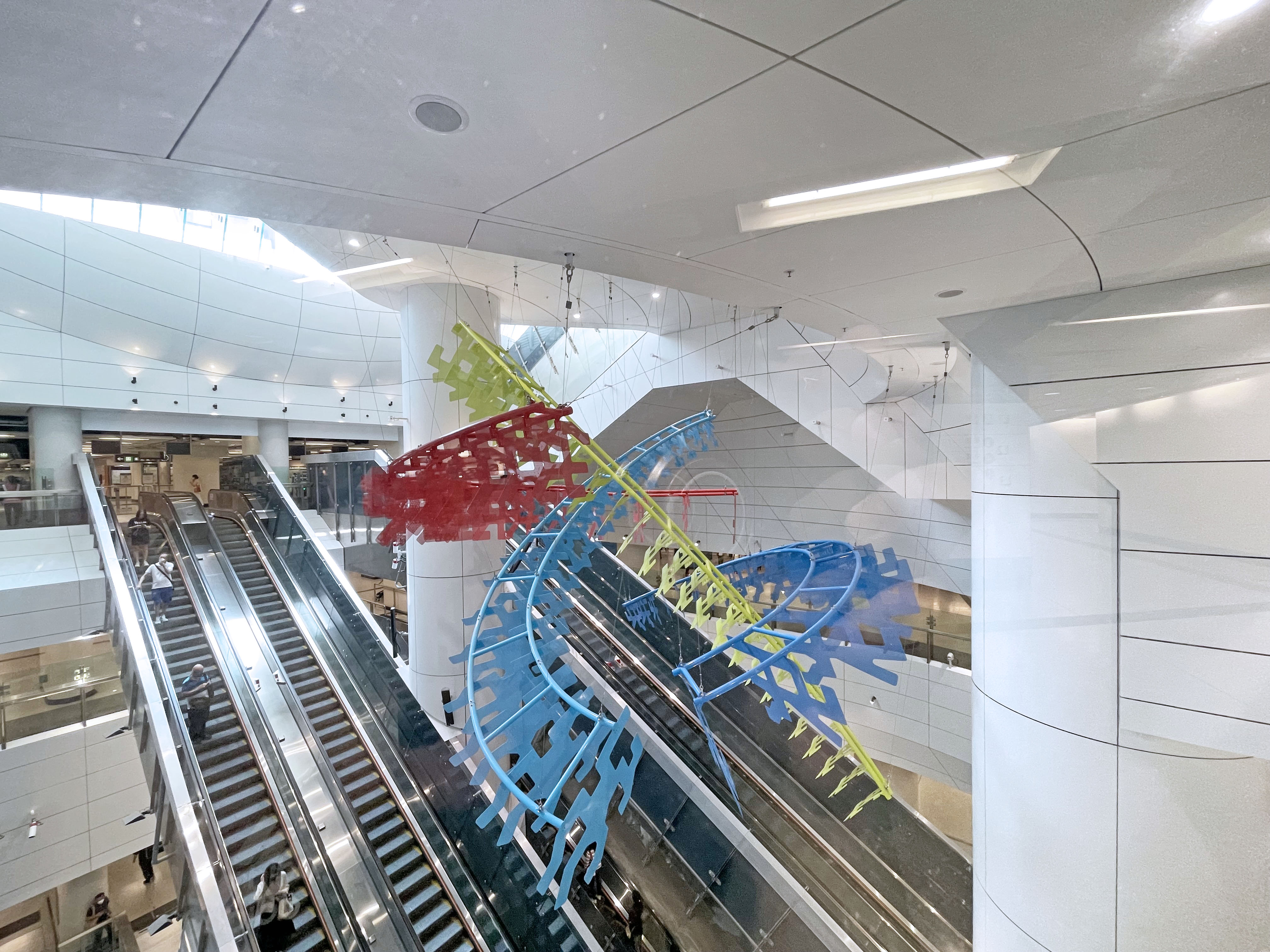
Artwork on the Exit E concourse

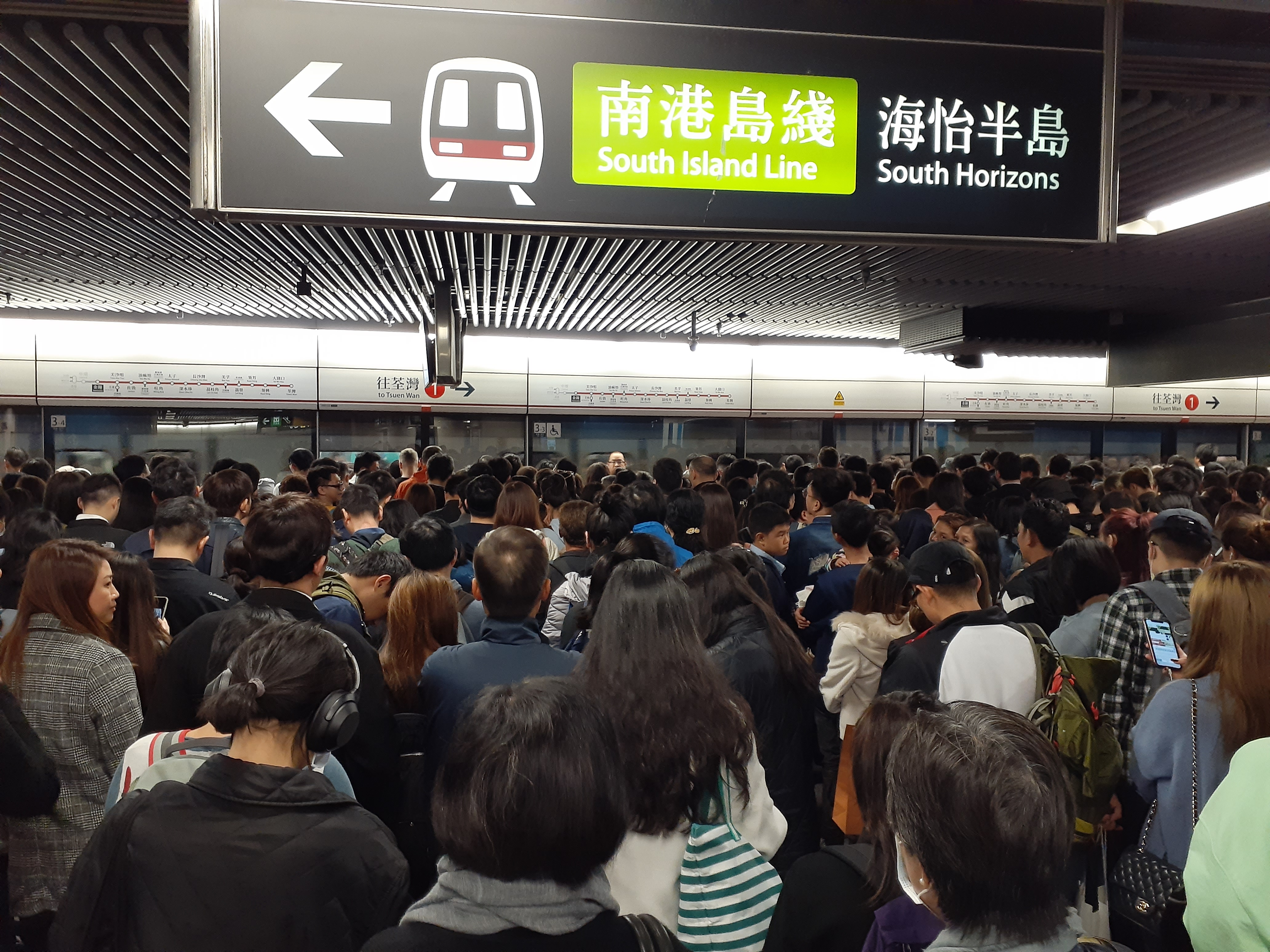
Passengers waiting for Tsuen Wan-bound Tsuen Wan line trains on Thursday, 16 January 2020.

=== Usage and overcrowding ===
As the primary interchange point between the Tsuen Wan line, the Island line, the East Rail line, and the South Island line, Admiralty is heavily congested during rush hours.

Admiralty and North Point are the only cross-platform interchange stations on Hong Kong Island between lines serving it and Kowloon in the MTR system. It is also the only interchange station for the South Island line. Despite trains departing at capacity (every 2.1 minutes), commuters frequently have to board the second or even the third train when changing lines. The situation deteriorated following fare cuts following the MTR–KCR merger.

Temporary measures are undertaken during peak hours, including the deployment of additional station assistants, adjustment of escalator directions and making pacifying announcements by local celebrities. During evening peak hours, some Tsuen Wan line trains are taken out of service at Central, and placed back into service at Admiralty, in order to relieve the demand at Admiralty. The existing signalling system of Tsuen Wan line was planned to be upgraded by Thales Transport & Security in 2018 for long-term use.

In addition, the 2022 extension of the East Rail line (from Hung Hom to Admiralty) has helped to divert some cross-harbour demand from the Tsuen Wan line, thereby reducing congestion. New "Cross-Harbour Easy" panels have been installed on the concourse and Island line platform levels to help harbour-crossing passengers make an informed choice between the two lines. These PIDS panels display a countdown to their next two trains, as well as simulations of real-time crowdedness on their respective platforms.

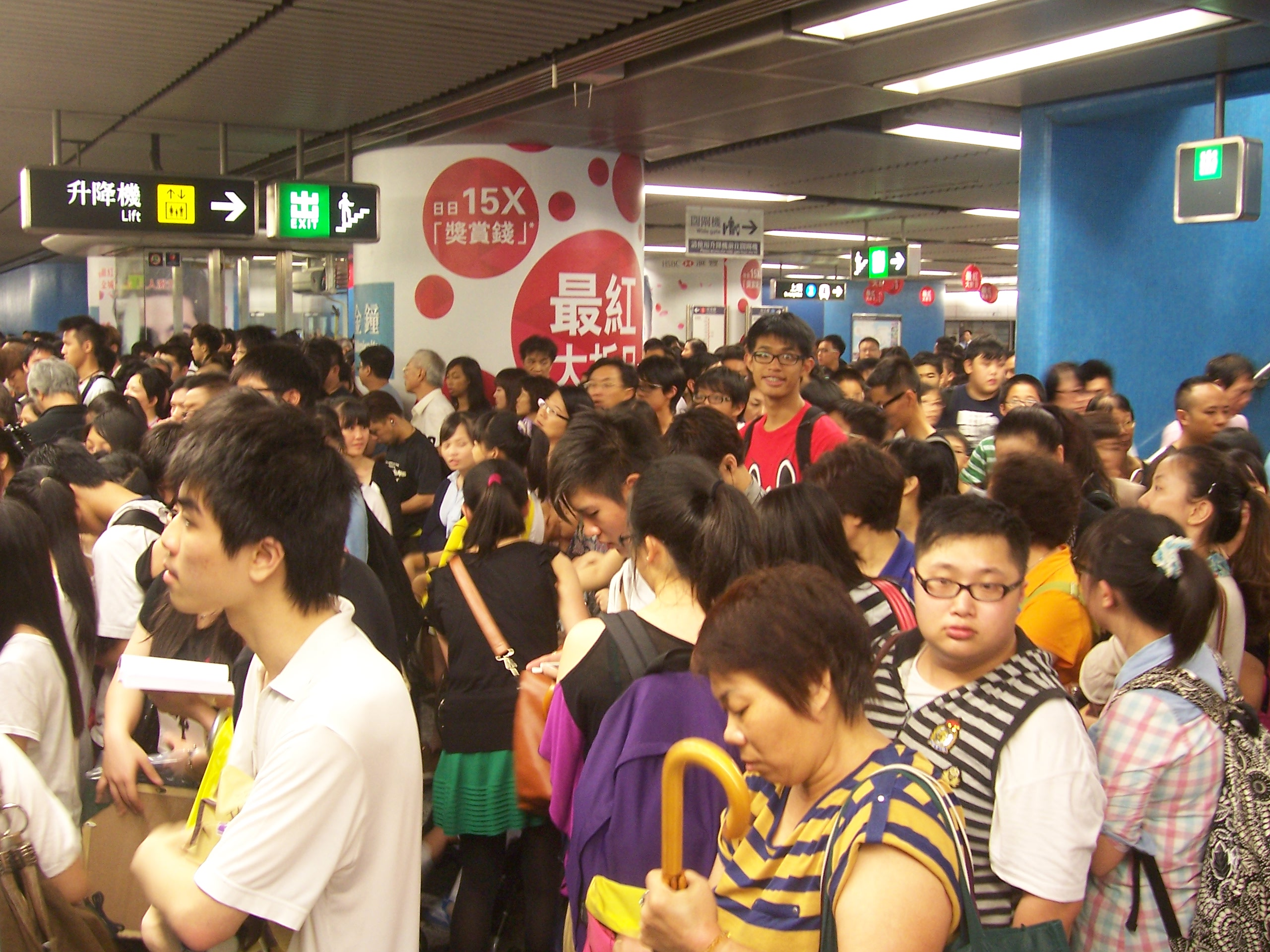
Crowd waiting to transfer train at Admiralty

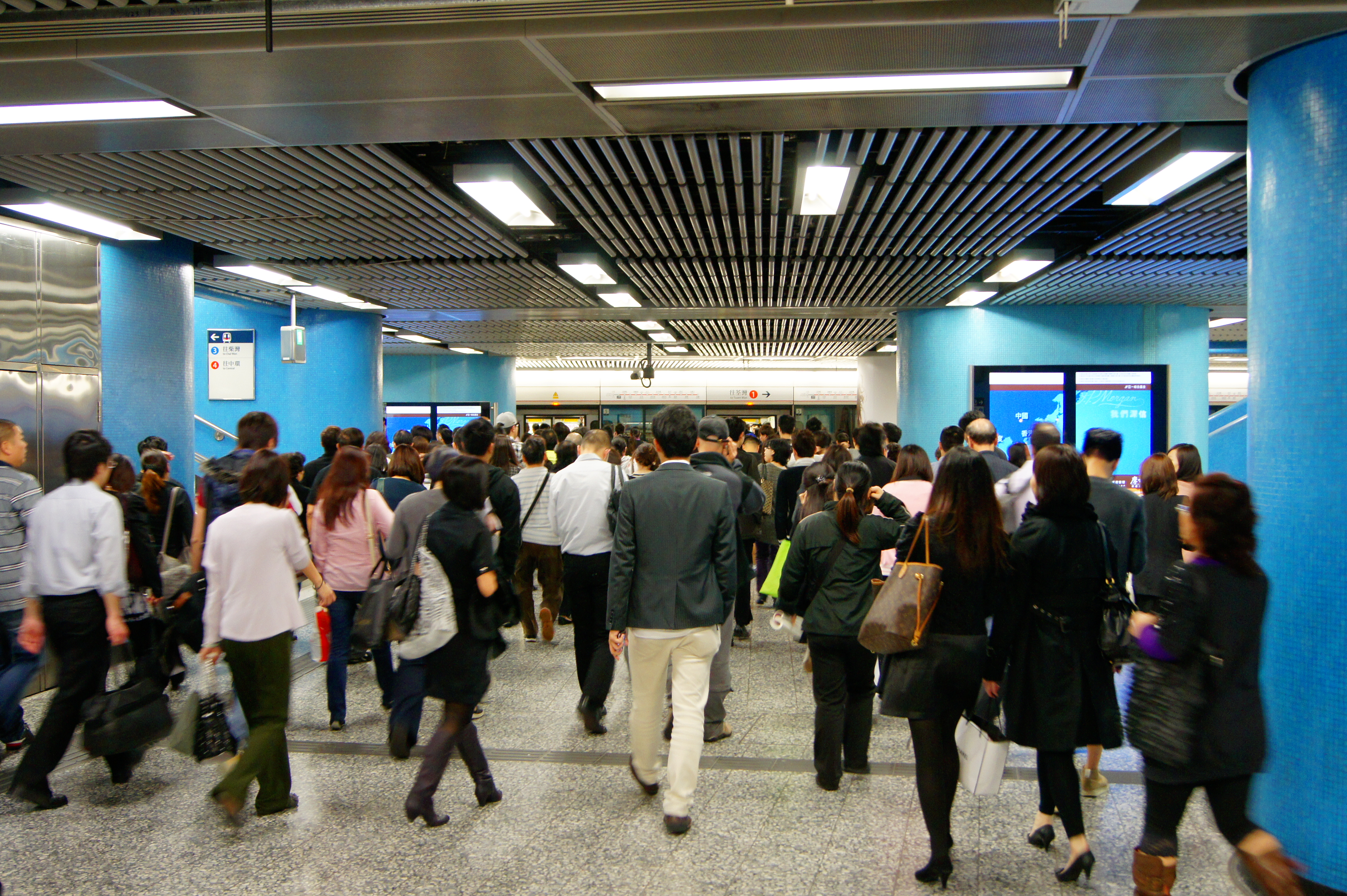
The busiest part of Admiralty during the evening peak hour – Tsuen Wan line platform for Tsuen Wan-bound train

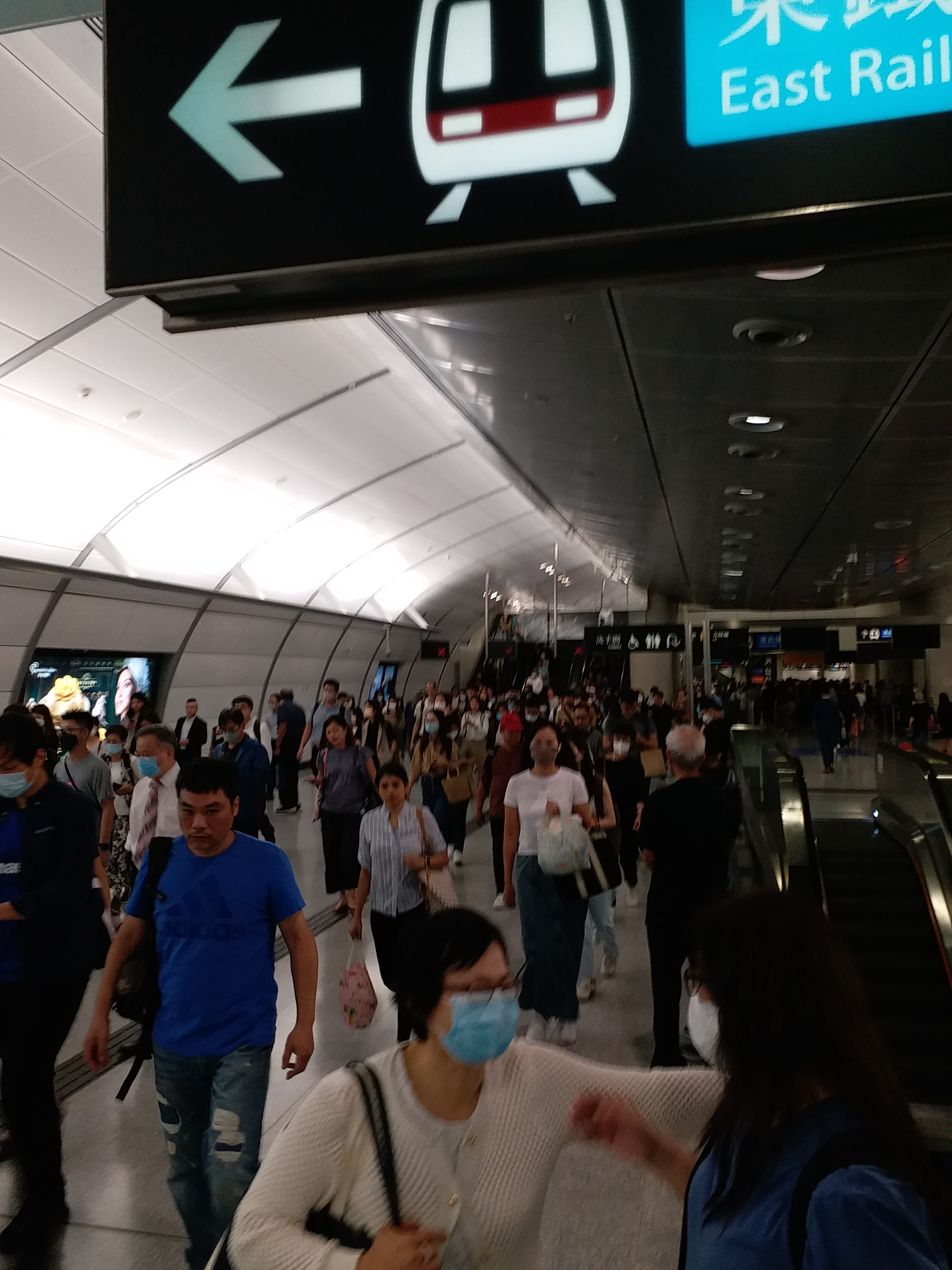
The new concourse for the East Rail line and the South Island line becomes very crowded during the evening peak hours.

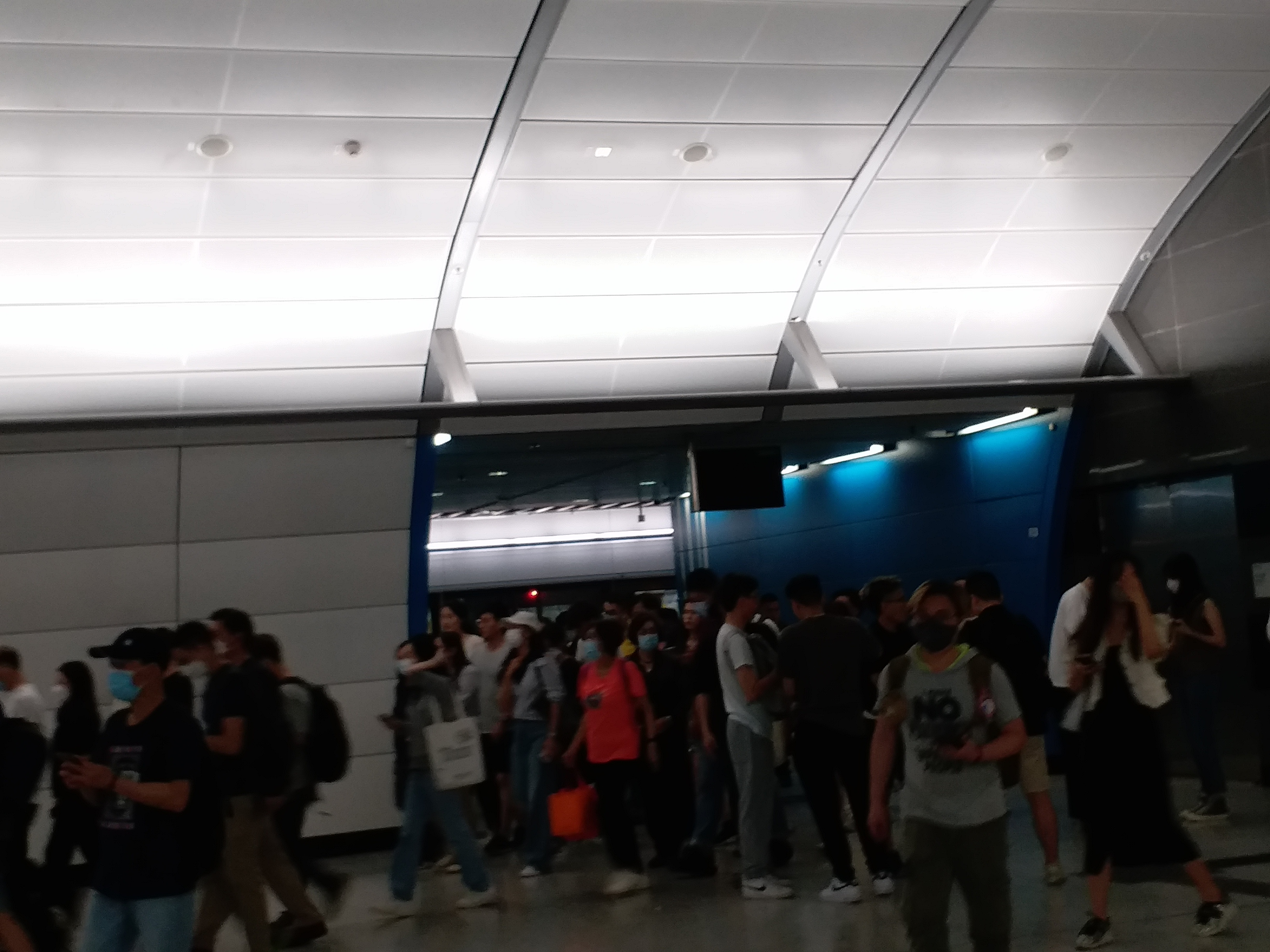
A lot of passengers alighting from an East Rail line train

=== Artworks ===
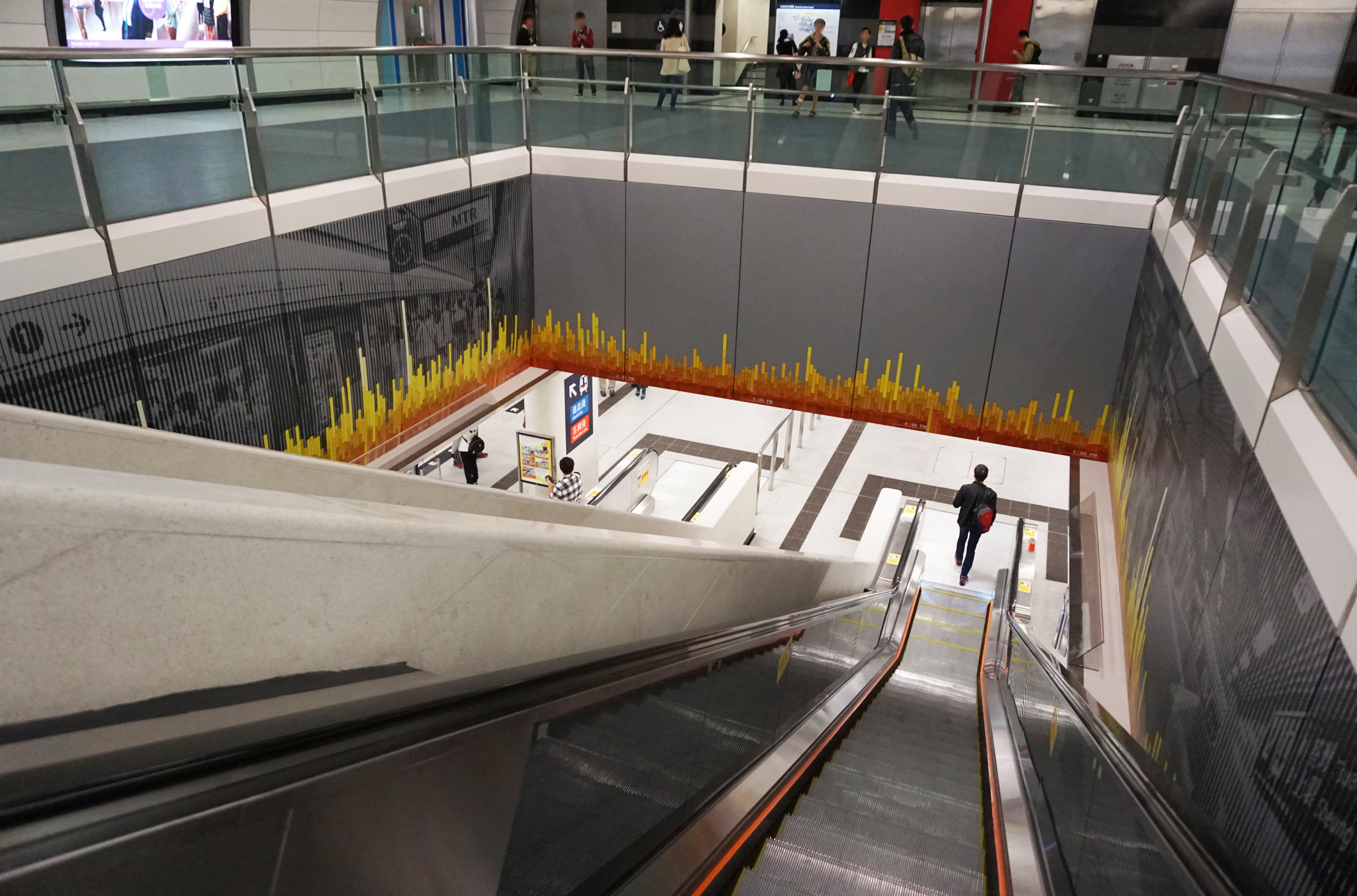
Art Work "Urban Soundscape" located between Level L5 and L6

The station expansion project that connected the South Island and East Rail lines to Admiralty brought three artworks to the station. The first is Sense of Green by Tony Ip, a bamboo-covered landscaped deck over Harcourt Garden. The second, Urban Soundscape by Otto Li, is located along either side of the escalator shaft between the new and current stations. It depicts passengers' journeys through Admiralty. Anchoring the atrium is the suspended aluminium sculpture Mapping Our Journey by American artist Talley Fisher, representing the four MTR lines converging at the station as well as the intersection of individuality and community.

== Entrances and exits ==
Admiralty is part of the central business district of Hong Kong Island. There are many office buildings around the station. A major shopping centre, Pacific Place, is accessed through a pedestrian walkway from Exit F.

- A: Admiralty Centre
- B: Drake Street, Lippo Centre
- C1: Queensway Plaza
- C2: Taxi stand
- D: United Centre
- E1: Rodney Street
- E2: CITIC Tower
- F: Pacific Place

== Transport connections ==
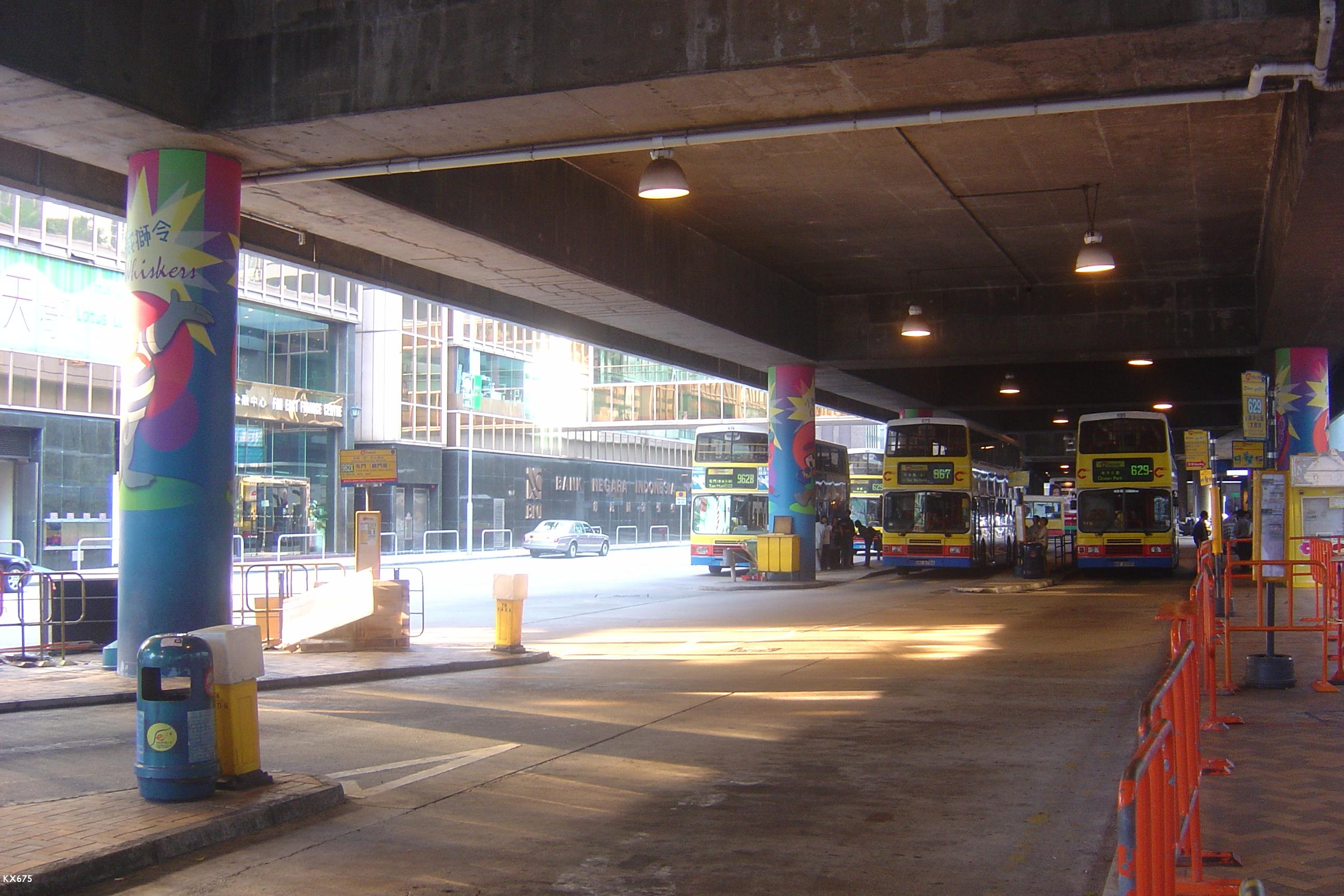
Admiralty (West) Public Transport Interchange at Admiralty station, near at Exit B

There is a bus terminus stretching across the length of Admiralty that can be reached from exits B, C2 and D. The terminus is served by buses that connect to many different parts of Hong Kong Island, Kowloon and the New Territories.

=== Bus routes ===
- Bus
  - KMB, serving only cross-harbour routes on Hong Kong Island
  - Citybus
  - Bus termini within walking distance of the station:
    - Admiralty (West) – Exit B
    - Admiralty (Tamar Street) – Exit B
    - Admiralty (Drake Street) – Exit C2
    - Admiralty (East) – Exit D
    - Admiralty (Rodney Street) – between Exit D
