= Horton baronets =

- Escutcheon of the Horton baronets of Chadderton
- Creation date: 1764
- Status: extinct
- Extinction date: 1821

The Horton Baronetcy, of Chadderton in the County of Lancaster, was a title in the Baronetage of Great Britain. It was created on 22 January 1764 for William Horton, High Sheriff of Lancashire in 1764. The second Baronet was High Sheriff of Lancashire in 1775. The title became extinct on the death of the third Baronet in 1821.

The family seat was Chadderton Hall, Chadderton, Lancashire.

== Horton baronets, of Chadderton (1764) ==
- Sir William Horton, 1st Baronet (1712–1774)
- Sir Watts Horton, 2nd Baronet (1753–1811) married Lady Henrietta Stanley, sister of 12th Earl of Derby.
- Sir Thomas Horton, 3rd Baronet (1758–1821)

== See also ==
- Wilmot baronets (Wilmot-Horton)

Baronetage of Great Britain
Preceded by Mayne baronets	Horton baronets of Chadderton; 22 January 1764	Succeeded by Rodney baronets
