= George Rodney, 8th Baron Rodney =

British soldier and peer

George Bridges Harley Guest Rodney, 8th Baron Rodney of Rodney Stoke (2 November 1891 – 18 December 1973) was a British soldier and peer, a member of the House of Lords for more than sixty years, from 1912 until his death, but rarely appeared there.

The son of George Rodney, 7th Baron Rodney, and his wife Corisande Evelyn Vere Guest, a daughter of Ivor Guest, 1st Baron Wimborne, he was educated at Eton College and Oriel College, Oxford, graduating BA in 1913. On 29 December 1909, while in his first term at the university, he succeeded his father as Baron Rodney in the Peerage of Great Britain (created in 1782 for his ancestor Admiral Sir George Rodney) and as a baronet.

In January 1912, Rodney was commissioned as a university candidate into the Royal Scots Greys, with his army pay to begin in August 1913, and in December 1914 was promoted to Lieutenant. During the First World War he rose to the rank of Captain, and after it he emigrated to Canada.

On 15 September 1917, Rodney married Lady Marjorie Lowther, a daughter of Lancelot Lowther, 6th Earl of Lonsdale and his wife Gwendoline Sophia Alice Sheffield, daughter of Sir Robert Sheffield, 5th Baronet, and they had five children:

- George William Rodney (1918–1942), a Flying Officer in the Royal Air Force who was killed on active service in the Second World War
- John Francis Rodney, later 9th Baron Rodney (1920–1992)
- Diana Rosemary Rodney (born 1924)
- Michael Christopher Rodney (1926–1993)
- Sylvia Corisande Rodney (1930–1985)

He died on 18 December 1973, aged 82.

Peerage of Great Britain
Preceded by George Brydges Harley Dennett Rodney	Baron Rodney; 1909–1973	Succeeded by John Francis Rodney
