= Rodney Williams (disambiguation) =

Rodney Williams (born 1947) is a politician serving as the governor-general of Antigua and Barbuda since 2014.

Rodney or Rod Williams may also refer to:

- Rod Williams (lineman) (born 1973), offensive/defensive lineman
- Rod Williams (defensive back) (Roderick Williams, born 1987), Canadian football defensive back
- Rod Williams (Australian footballer) (born 1948), played 3 matches for South Melbourne in the VFL
- Rod Williams (Welsh footballer) (Roderick Williams, 1909–1987), Welsh footballer
- Rodney Williams (punter) (born 1977), American and Canadian football punter
- Rodney Williams (tight end) (born 1998), American football tight end
- Rodney Williams (wide receiver) (born 1973), American football wide receiver
- Rodney Williams (basketball) (born 1991), American basketball player
- Rod Williams, a character in the film Get Out

== See also ==
- Roderick Williams (born 1965), opera singer
