= Rodney =

Rodney may refer to:

== People ==
- Rodney (name)
- Rodney (wrestler), American professional wrestler

== Places ==
Australia

- Electoral district of Rodney, a former electoral district in Victoria
- Rodney County, Queensland

Canada

- Rodney, Ontario, a village located within the township of West Elgin, Ontario

New Zealand

- Rodney District, a former territorial local authority district
- Rodney (local board area), a local government area
  - Rodney Local Board, an Auckland Council local board
  - Rodney Ward, an Auckland Council ward
- Rodney (New Zealand electorate), an electoral district containing most of Rodney District

United States

- Rodney, Iowa
- Rodney, Mississippi, a former city
- Rodney, Ohio
- Rodney, Oklahoma, a ghost town
- Rodney, Wisconsin, a ghost town
- Rodney Village, Delaware
- Rodney Scout Reservation Delmarva Council, Northeast, Maryland

== Other uses ==
- Rodney (TV series)
- Rodney boat, a type of boat used for fishing & shore transport in Newfoundland
- HMS Rodney, six ships of the British Royal Navy named after Admiral George Brydges Rodney
