= Sir Robert Sheffield, 5th Baronet =

Sir Robert Sheffield, 5th Baronet (1823–1886) was a Royal Horse Guards officer, landowner, and High Sheriff of Lincolnshire.

Educated at Eton College and Christ Church, Oxford, in 1842 he purchased a commission as a cornet in the Royal Horse Guards. He was promoted, also by purchase, to lieutenant in 1845 and to captain in 1849. In 1861 he was granted brevet rank as a major, and he retired from the army later that year. On 7 November 1862 he inherited the Sheffield baronetcy and the Normanby Hall estate in Lincolnshire and became a Justice of the Peace. Sheffield was appointed a Deputy Lieutenant for Lincolnshire in 1852 and High Sheriff of the county in 1872.

Sheffield married Priscilla Isabel Laura Dumaresq, a daughter of Colonel Henry Dumaresq and Lady Elizabeth Sophia Butler-Danvers, grand-daughter of Brinsley Butler, 2nd Earl of Lanesborough, and they had one son and three daughters.

- Gwendoline Sophia Alice (1869–1921), who married Lancelot Lowther, 6th Earl of Lonsdale, whose daughter Lady Marjorie Lowther married George Rodney, 8th Baron Rodney.
- Helen (1872–1950)
- Sir Berkeley Digby George (1876–1946)
- Dorothy Marie Isolde (1878–1964)

Sheffield died in 1886.

Honorary titles
Preceded by John Reeve	High Sheriff of Lincolnshire; 1872	Succeeded by Valentine Elwes
Baronetage of Great Britain
Preceded by Robert Sheffield	Baronet (of Normanby); 1862–1886	Succeeded by Berkeley Sheffield
