= Admiralty (East) Public Transport Interchange =

Coordinates: 22°16′43″N 114°09′56″E

Admiralty (East) Public Transport Interchange 金鐘（東）公共運輸交匯處
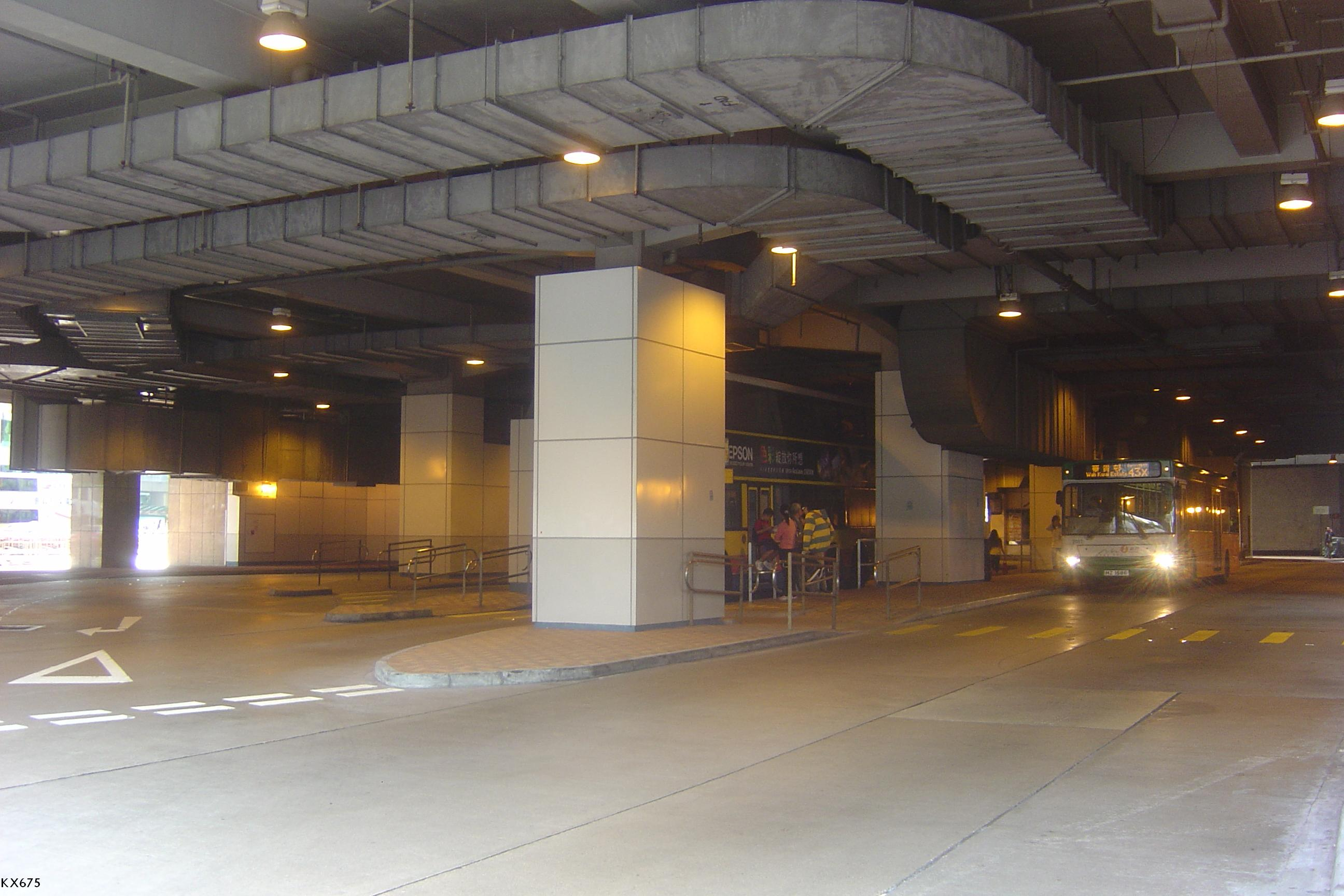

General information
- Other names: Admiralty (East) Bus Terminus (Citybus/NWFB); Admiralty Railway Station (East) Bus Terminus (KMB)
- Location: Ground floor, United Centre, 95 Queensway; Admiralty; Central and Western
- Bus routes: Terminating: Citybus Routes 30X, 70M, 90B and 930; NWFB Route 43X and 590A; Citybus and KMB Joint-operated Routes 601, 680, 680B, 680P, 980X, 981P, 982X, 985; As a circular point: Citybus Routes 37B and 37X; Routes stop at this terminus: Citybus Routes 70, 70P, 75, 90 and 97
- Connections: Feeder transport: MTR Island line, Tsuen Wan line, South Island line and East Rail line Admiralty Station; Major structures/sights nearby: United Centre, Queensway Plaza and Pacific Place

History
- Opened: 12 February 1980; 46 years ago
Location

The Admiralty (East) Public Transport Interchange (Chinese: 金鐘（東）公共運輸交匯處) is a major bus terminus located in Admiralty, Central and Western District, Hong Kong. Located above Admiralty Station of the MTR, the terminus hosts bus routes to most destinations in the Southern District west of Deep Water Bay, so the usage is relatively high.

The interchange has different names named by different bus companies. The official name from the Government is Admiralty (East) Public Transport Interchange; Citybus and New World First Bus named it as the Admiralty (East) Bus Terminus (Chinese: 金鐘（東）巴士總站); while the name from Kowloon Motor Bus is Admiralty Railway Station (East) Bus Terminus (Chinese: 金鐘鐵路站（東）巴士總站).

== Location of terminus ==
Admiralty (East) Public Transport Interchange is located at 95 Queensway, ground floor of the United Centre. A MTR entrance/exit is located next to the exit of the terminus.

== Facilities ==
Fixed Regulators' Room is installed next to the entrance of the terminus. An NWFB Customer Service Centre is located at this terminus, providing route information of Citybus and NWFB, souvenirs for sale and value-adding of Octopus cards.

== Feeder transport ==
- MTR Island line, Tsuen Wan line, East Rail line and South Island line serving Admiralty Station (Exit D)
- Admiralty (Rodney Street) Bus Terminus is located opposite to the terminus exit on Rodney Street. Citybus Route 789 to Siu Sai Wan terminates there.
