= George Rodney, 10th Baron Rodney =

British peer

George Brydges Rodney, 10th Baron Rodney of Rodney Stoke (3 January 1953 – 13 February 2011) was a British peer, a member of the House of Lords from 1992 until 1999, when he was one of those who lost their seats as a result of the House of Lords Act 1999.

Educated at Eton College, he was the only son of John Rodney, 9th Baron Rodney, and his wife Régine Elisabeth Lucienne Jeanne Thérèse Marie Ghislaine d'Opdorp, daughter of Chevalier Robert Egide Marie Ghislain Pangaert d'Opdorp. He had one sister, Anne Rodney (born 1955).

On 13 October 1992, he succeeded his father as Baron Rodney of Rodney Stoke, in the peerage of Great Britain (created 1782) and as a baronet, gaining a seat in the House of Lords. On 20 August 1996, he married Jane Blakeney, a daughter of Rowan Blakeney, and they had a son, John George Brydges Rodney, born in 1999.

Lord Rodney died on 13 February 2011, aged 58, and his eleven-year-old son succeeded him.

At the time of his death, Rodney's published address was 38 Pembroke Road, Kensington, London W8.

== Notes ==
Peerage of Great Britain
Preceded by John Rodney	Baron Rodney; 1992–2011	Succeeded by John Rodney
