= Lancelot Lowther, 6th Earl of Lonsdale =

English peer (1867–1953)

Lancelot Edward Lowther, 6th Earl of Lonsdale, OBE, DL (25 June 1867 – 11 March 1953) was an English peer, the fourth and youngest son of Henry Lowther, 3rd Earl of Lonsdale.

== Biography ==
Lowther was educated at Malvern College and Magdalene College, Cambridge. At Cambridge, he was a member of the University Pitt Club. On 13 October 1886 Lowther was made lieutenant in the 3rd Battalion, The Border Regiment (The Royal Cumberland Militia).

Soon thereafter, he was appointed a deputy lieutenant in the counties his family had traditionally dominated, Cumberland (21 November 1891) and Westmorland (26 January 1892). In keeping with the family tradition, he enjoyed sports and, by 1905, was a Master of the Drag (drag hunting) and the Deputy Master of the Quorn.

During World War I, he served in the Middle East, and after the war received the OBE (3 June 1919) and the Order of the Nile, 4th Class (16 January 1920). On 3 June 1922, the aging Lowther, now 55, resigned his deputy lieutenancy of Westmorland.

In 1944, he finally succeeded to the Earldom of Lonsdale on the death of his childless brother, Hugh. Hugh's free-spending, sporting life had largely wrecked the estate, and he was forced to auction off the contents of Lowther Castle in 1947. This proved to be the largest English country house sale of the 20th Century.

== Marriages and family ==
On 24 April 1889, Lonsdale married Gwendoline Sophia Alice Sheffield (born 1869, died 4 November 1921), daughter of Sir Robert Sheffield, 5th Baronet, with whom he had three children:

- Lady Barbara Lowther (born 8 April 1890, died 1979), married Col (James) Archibald Innes in 1914, divorced 1921, and had issue.
- Lady Marjorie Lowther (born 6 February 1895, died 29 July 1968), married George Rodney, 8th Baron Rodney (1891–1973) on 15 September 1917 and was the mother of John Rodney, 9th Baron Rodney.
- Anthony Lowther, Viscount Lowther (born 24 September 1896, died 6 October 1949) father of James Lowther, 7th Earl of Lonsdale.

His first wife, Gwendoline, having died in 1921, Lonsdale married Sybil Beatrix Feetham on 8 October 1923. They had one son together:

- Hon. Timothy Lancelot Lowther (born 27 April 1925, died 1984)

Lonsdale's eldest son Anthony predeceased him in 1949. Lord Lonsdale died in 1953 and was succeeded in the earldom by his grandson James. The Countess of Lonsdale died on 10 March 1966.

Peerage of the United Kingdom
Preceded by Hugh Lowther	Earl of Lonsdale; 1944–1953	Succeeded by James Lowther
