= George Brydges Harley Dennett Rodney, 7th Baron Rodney =

British Army officer

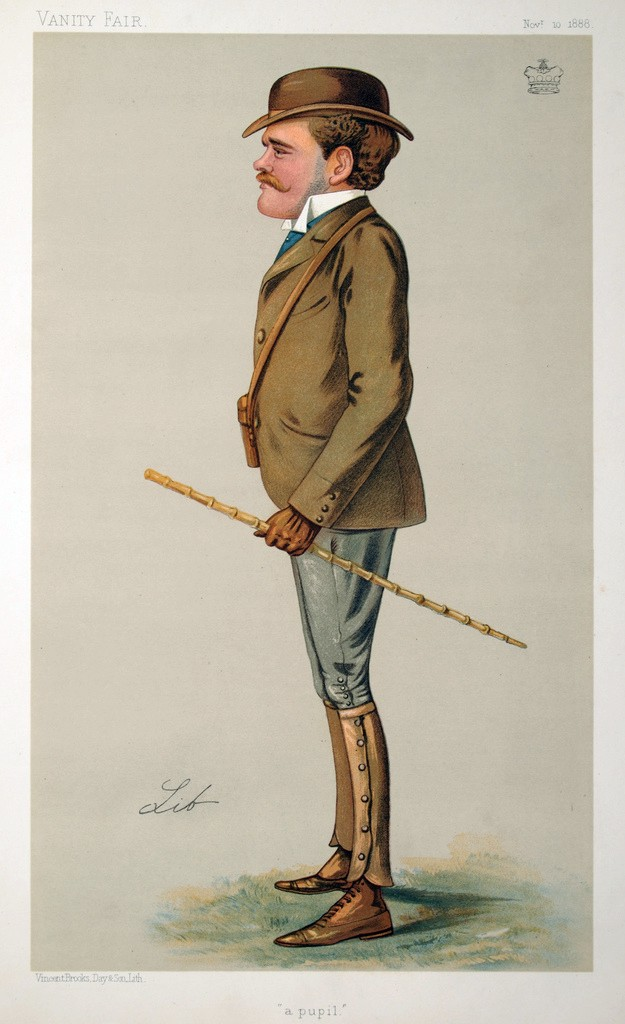
- Vanity Fair, 1888

Personal details
- Born: 28 February 1857
- Died: 29 December 1909 (aged 52)

George Brydges (Note: Sometimes spelled Bridges.) Harley Dennett Rodney, 7th Baron Rodney (28 February 1857 – 29 December 1909) was a British Army officer notable for his service in the Egyptian and Nile campaigns of the 1880s. He succeeded his father to the Rodney Barony in 1864 and was succeeded by his son George Bridges Harley Guest Rodney (1891–1973).

== Life ==
Rodney was a captain in the 1st Life Guards from 1886 to 1888, serving with them in the Egyptian and Nile campaigns before moving to the Reserve of Officers at the same rank in 1889. He exhausted his considerable inherited fortune on bloodstock and gambling. In 1887, his first season as a racehorse owner, he won the St Leger Stakes with Kilwarlin and the Cesarewitch Handicap with Humewood. He attended the Devonshire House Ball of 1897 as King Arthur.

He also held the rank of captain in the Shropshire Imperial Yeomanry from 1890 to 1897 before becoming lieutenant colonel of the 16th Middlesex (London Irish) Rifle Volunteers in 1898. He was the last of his family to live at Berrington Hall, selling it and its estate to Frederick Cawley, MP in 1901. He became lieutenant colonel of 24th (County of London) Battalion (The Queen's) soon after the formation of the London Regiment and took an active interest in cadet corps in south London, dying in Camberwell aged 52 and being buried at Camberwell Old Cemetery.

== Marriage and issue ==
On 24 January 1891 at St James's Church, Piccadilly he married Corisande Evelyn Vere Guest (4 July 1870 – 1 September 1943), second daughter of Ivor Guest, 1st Baron Wimborne, and his wife Lady Cornelia Henrietta Maria Spencer-Churchill, a daughter of John Spencer-Churchill, 7th Duke of Marlborough and thus a great-aunt of Winston Churchill. Rodney and his wife had four sons:

1. George Bridges Harley Guest Rodney, later 8th Baron Rodney
2. James Henry Bertie Rodney (1893–1933)
3. Charles Christian Simon Rodney (1895–1980)
4. William Francis Rodney (1896–1915)

Almost immediately after the marriage he began physically abusing his wife and after he struck her in the eye on 21 April 1899 she ceased living with him. He moved in with Corisande's former lady's maid Annie Turner and his wife filed an initial petition of divorce on grounds of cruelty and adultery, though this was abandoned at his request in favour of a deed of separation. He continued to live with Turner and a second petition was presented on the same grounds - George did not contest it and a decree nisi and custody of their children were granted to Corisande in 1902.

On 28 January 1903, Rodney married secondly Charlotte Eugenia Probyn, daughter of Charlotte Seymour Jones and her husband Edmund Probyn. She survived him, though this second marriage had no issue.

== Notes ==
Peerage of Great Britain
Preceded by Robert Dennett Rodney	Baron Rodney; 1864-1909	Succeeded by George Bridges Harley Guest Rodney
