= Drake Street =

Street in Admiralty, Hong Kong

Drake Street 德立街
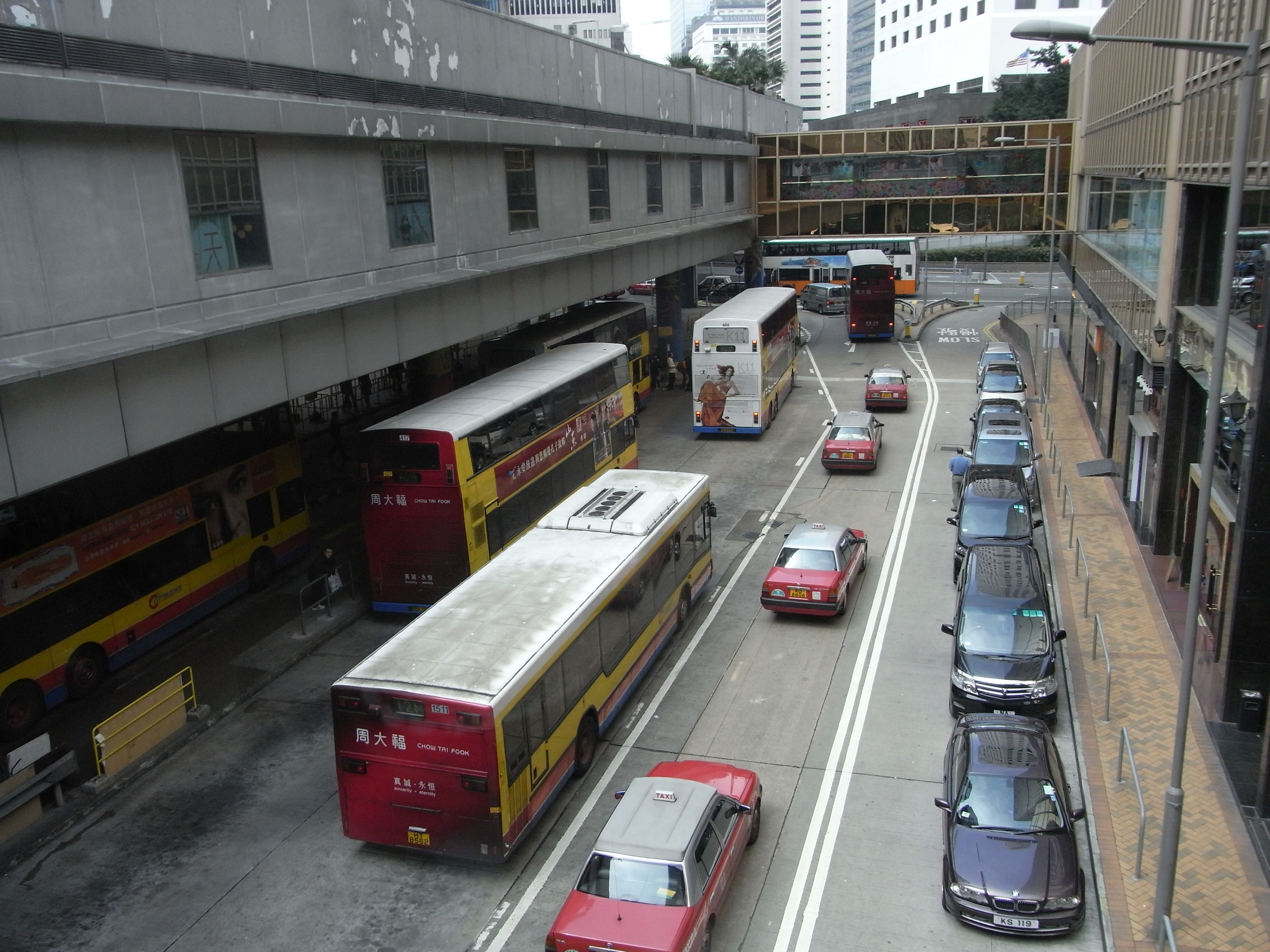
- Location: Admiralty, Hong Kong

Drake Street (Chinese: 德立街; Jyutping: dak1 lap6 gaai1) is a street in Admiralty, Hong Kong. It was named after the Royal Navy ship HMS Drake. A portion of the Admiralty MTR station lies underneath the street.

The area where Drake Street is located was originally part of the Naval Dockyard and Wellington Barracks. As military facilities moved away from the area, Admiralty was developed into a central business district and Drake Street was built in the 1980s.

== See also ==
- List of streets and roads in Hong Kong
