= Spencer Rodney, 5th Baron Rodney =

English peer and clergyman

Spencer Rodney, 5th Baron Rodney (30 April 1785 – 15 May 1846), was an English peer and clergyman, styled The Honourable Spencer Rodney from 1802 until 1843.

Rodney was educated at Westminster School and then matriculated at All Souls College, Oxford, which presented him to the living of Elmley, Kent in 1805. He took his BA from All Souls in 1807 and was elected a Fellow of the College; he later took his MA from All Souls in 1811. Rodney was appointed honorary vicar of Wonastow, Monmouthshire and rector of Luddenham, Kent in 1812. In 1813, he was appointed honorary vicar of Kenchester, Herefordshire.

Rodney gave up the rectorate of Elmley in 1818. In 1821, he was appointed vicar of New Romney, Kent. He received his last preferment in 1833, as honorary rector of Chelsfield, Kent.

In 1843, Spencer succeeded his brother Thomas as Baron Rodney and resigned his Fellowship the following year. He died in 1846 at his house in Harley Street, and was buried at Eye in Herefordshire. His nephew Robert Dennett Rodney, an Army officer, succeeded him in the barony.

Peerage of Great Britain
Preceded by Thomas Harley-Rodney	Baron Rodney; 1843–1846	Succeeded by Robert Rodney
