= Rod Williams (Welsh footballer) =

Welsh footballer

Personal information
- Full name: Roderick Williams
- Date of birth: 2 December 1909
- Place of birth: Newport, Wales
- Date of death: August 1987 (aged 77)
- Place of death: East Dereham, England
- Height: 5 ft 10 in (1.78 m)
- Position: Centre forward

Senior career*
| Years | Team | Apps | (Gls) |
- Sutton United
| | Epsom Town | 5 | (1) |
| –1925 | Uxbridge Town | | |
| 1932–1933 | Crystal Palace | 0 | (0) |
| 1933–1936 | Norwich City | 19 | (9) |
| 1936–1937 | Exeter City | 41 | (29) |
| 1937 | Reading | 14 | (12) |
| 1937–1938 | West Ham United | 9 | (5) |
| 1938–1942 | Clapton Orient | 35 | (16) |
- * Club domestic league appearances and goals

Roderick Williams (2 December 1909 – August 1987) was a Welsh professional footballer who played in the Football League for Norwich City, Exeter City, Reading, West Ham United and Clapton Orient as a centre forward.

== Personal life ==
Williams was born in Newport, Wales and grew up in Wandsworth, England.

== Career statistics ==
Appearances and goals by club, season and competition
| Club | Season | League | | | FA Cup | | Total | |
| Club | Season | Division | Apps | Goals | Apps | Goals | Apps | Goals |
|---|---|---|---|---|---|---|---|---|
| Exeter City | 1936–37 | Third Division South | 41 | 29 | 0 | 0 | 41 | 29 |
| West Ham United | 1937–38 | Second Division | 9 | 5 | 1 | 0 | 10 | 5 |
| Career total | | | 50 | 34 | 1 | 0 | 51 | 34 |
