= Baron Rodney =

Barony in the Peerage of Great Britain

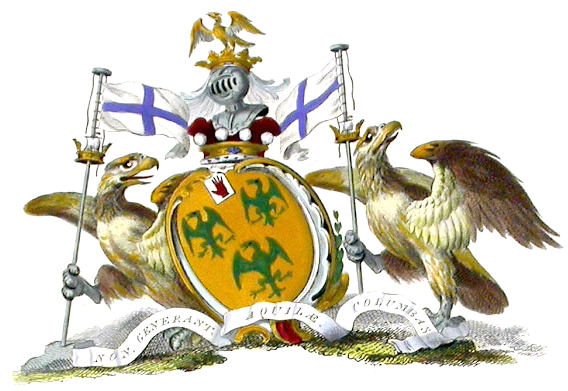
Arms of the Barons Rodney.

Baron Rodney, of Rodney Stoke in the County of Somerset, is a title in the Peerage of Great Britain. It was created in 1782 for the naval commander Sir George Brydges Rodney, 1st Baronet. He had previously been created a Baronet, of Alresford in the County of Southampton, in the Baronetage of Great Britain on 22 January 1764. His son, the second Baron, represented Northampton in Parliament. He was succeeded by his eldest son, the third Baron. He served as Lord Lieutenant of Radnorshire. His younger brother, the fourth Baron, assumed by Royal licence the additional surname of Harley in 1804. On his death the titles passed to his younger brother, the fifth Baron. He was Rector of Elmley in Kent. He was succeeded by his nephew, the sixth Baron. He was the son of Captain the Hon. Robert Rodney, fourth son of the second Baron. The sixth Baron's great-grandson, the ninth Baron, was an active member of the House of Lords and served as a Delegate to the Council of Europe and the Western European Union. As of 2011 the titles are held by the latter's grandson, the eleventh Baron, who succeeded in 2011.

== Barons Rodney (1782) ==
- George Brydges Rodney, 1st Baron Rodney (1718–1792)
- George Rodney, 2nd Baron Rodney (1753–1802)
- George Rodney, 3rd Baron Rodney (1782–1842)
- Thomas James Harley-Rodney, 4th Baron Rodney (1784–1843)
- Spencer Rodney, 5th Baron Rodney (1785–1846)
- Robert Dennett Rodney, 6th Baron Rodney (1820–1864)
- George Brydges Harley Dennett Rodney, 7th Baron Rodney (1857–1909)
- George Bridges Harley Guest Rodney, 8th Baron Rodney (1891–1973)
- John Francis Rodney, 9th Baron Rodney (1920–1992)
- George Brydges Rodney, 10th Baron Rodney (1953–2011)
- John George Brydges Rodney, 11th Baron Rodney (b. 1999)

The heir presumptive is the kinsman Nicholas Simon Harley Rodney (b. 1947).

Baronetage of Great Britain
Preceded by Horton baronets	Rodney baronets of Alresford; 22 January 1764	Succeeded by Moore baronets
