= Lowther Castle =

Country house in Cumbria, England

Coordinates: 54°36′21″N 2°44′25″W

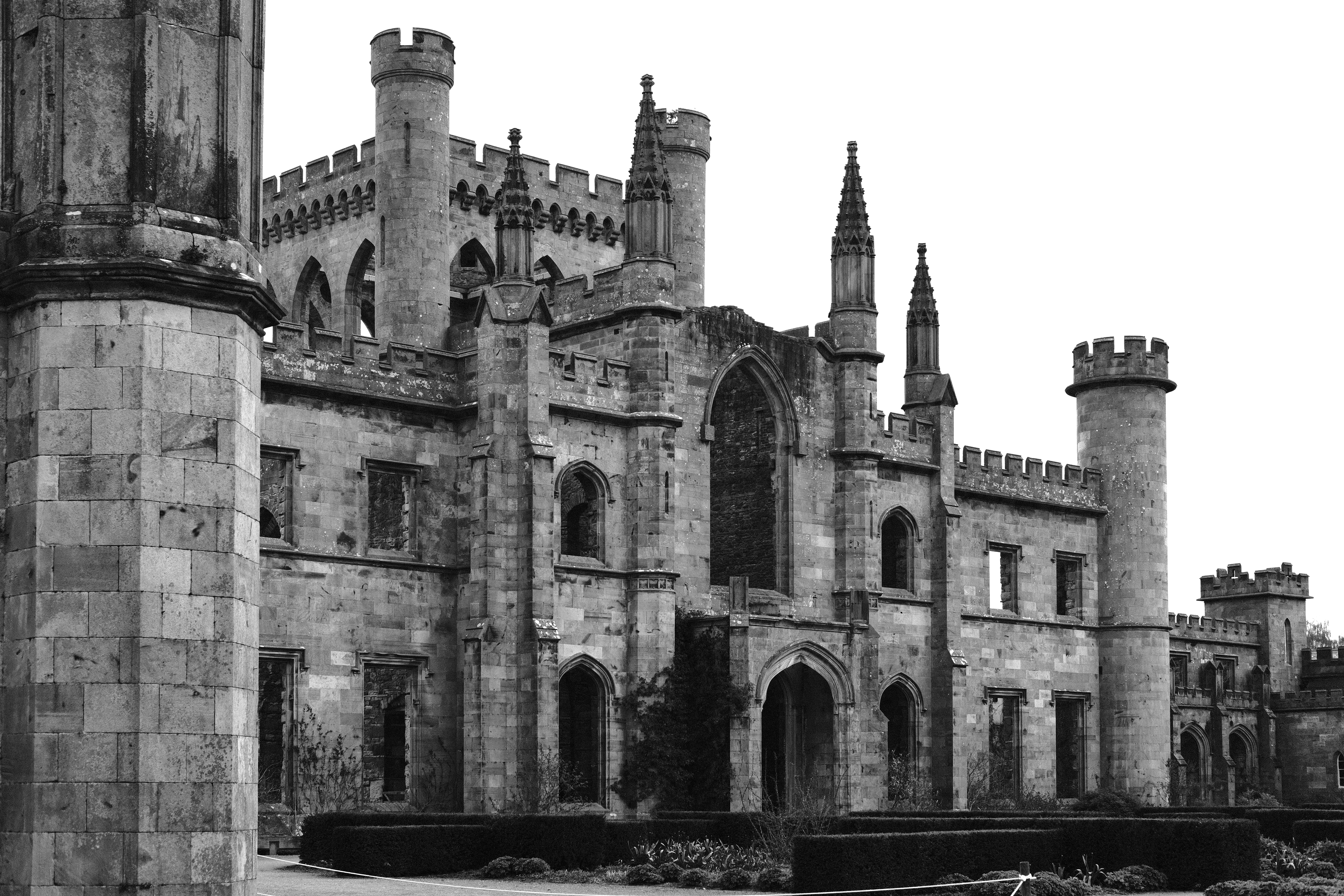
The garden front of the castle

Lowther Hall, the predecessor to Lowther Castle, built in the late 17th century by Viscount Lonsdale. The main wing was destroyed following a chimney fire in 1718. This painting, done by Lady Mary Lowther in c. 1765, shows trees growing through the roof.

Lowther Castle is a ruined country house in Lowther, Cumbria, England. The estate has belonged to the Lowther family, latterly the earls of Lonsdale, since the Middle Ages. The house was largely built between 1806 and 1814 for William Lowther, 1st Earl of Lonsdale and designed by Robert Smirke in his first major commission. It incorporates fragments of the previous house on the site, which was completed in 1685 for John Lowther, 1st Viscount Lonsdale. It is open to the public and is a grade II* listed building.

The house takes the form of a sham castle, and was known as Lowther Hall before the 1806 rebuilding. It consists of a nine-bay central block with angle turrets, a porte-cochère on the entrance front, and a larger tower in the centre, which is linked by low wings to angle pavilions; the whole building is embattled. The windows are a mixture of Gothic pointed arches and flat-topped in the Tudor style. There is a service wing to the east. In front of the house is a large forecourt enclosed a battlemented wall containing several turrets and a gatehouse. The house was closed by the Hugh Lowther, 5th Earl of Lonsdale in 1935 and partly used as a tank training range during World War II. The contents were sold in 1947 and the roof removed in 1957.

The castle is owned by the Lowther estate and leased by the Lowther Castle and Gardens Trust, which in turn sub-leases the castle back to the estate. The wider estate is currently undergoing rewilding.

== History ==
The original settlement at the site was founded in 1120 by Dolfin de Lowther, a nobleman descended from Danelaw Viking conquerors.

Francis Knollys escorted Mary, Queen of Scots to Lowther Hall (as the house was then known) on 13 July 1568 on her way to Wharton Hall and Bolton Castle.

=== William and Augusta Lowther, 1st Earl and Countess of Lonsdale ===
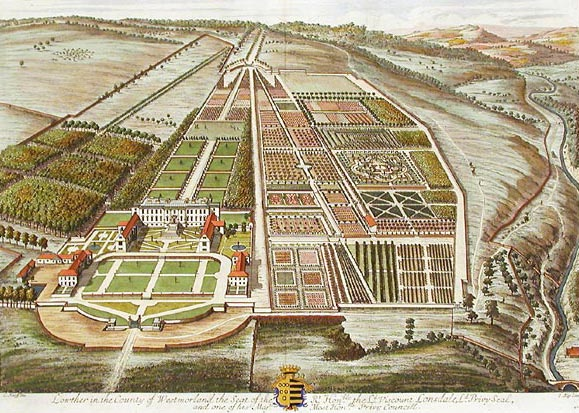
Lowther Hall in the early 18th century

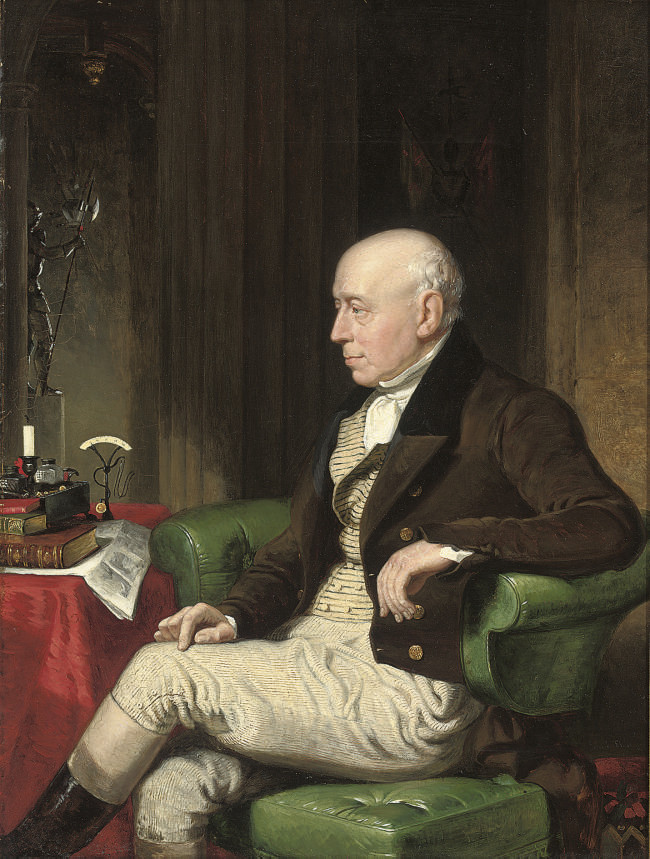
William Lowther 1st Earl of Lonsdale.

William Lowther was born in 1757, and he was about 52 years old when he built Lowther Castle. He was the eldest son of Reverend Sir William Lowther and Anne Zouch. He was educated at Cambridge University, and in 1780 at the age of 23 he became a Member of Parliament. A year later he married Lady Augusta Fane, the daughter of John 9th Earl of Westmorland. He was an MP for 22 years until 1802, when he inherited the estates from his cousin Sir James Lowther.

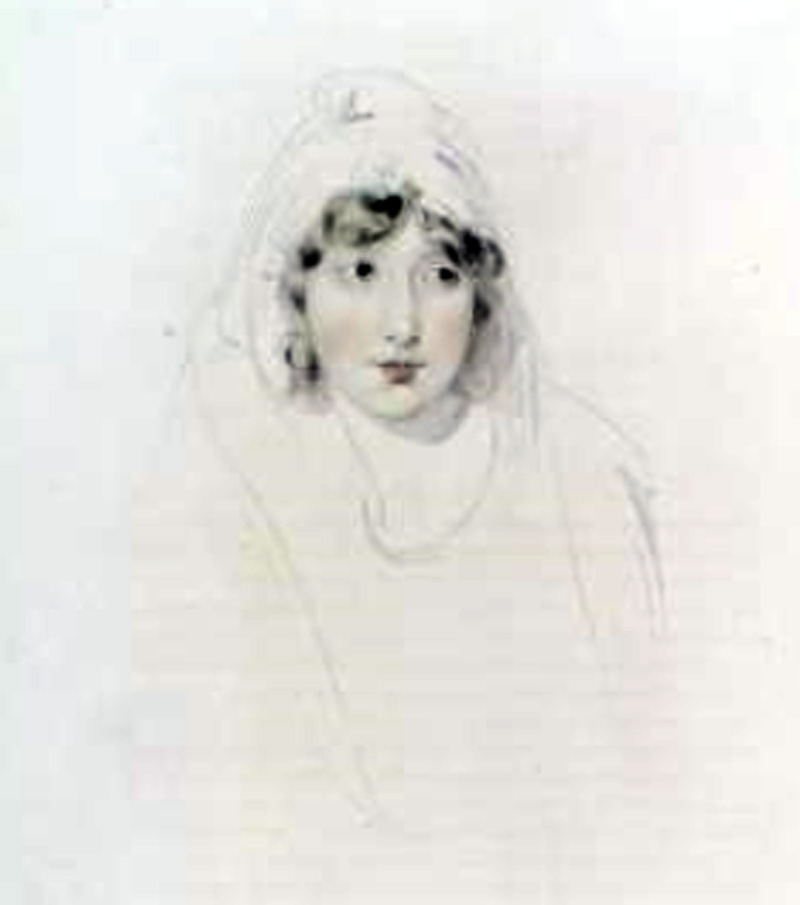
Augusta Countess of Lonsdale drawing by Sir Thomas Lawrence.

Sir James Lowther had a rather disreputable history. He incurred a large debt to the father of William Wordsworth and refused to pay it despite numerous requests from the family. When Sir James Lowther died in 1802 and William inherited his fortune he immediately refunded the money to the Wordsworth family with interest. He also befriended William Wordsworth and assisted him financially. Wordsworth frequently stayed at Lowther Castle; many of his published letters are written from there.

Wordsworth wrote several poems for William. Part of his verse about Lowther Castle is as follows:

"Lowther! in thy majestic Pile are seen
Cathedral pomp and grace in apt accord
With the baronial castle’s sterner mien"

Lady Augusta Lonsdale, William's wife, was also a patron of the arts, and she kept an album in which some of the poets visiting Lowther Castle wrote verse. Wordsworth wrote a long poem in her honour in the album; it has been included in his published works.

Robert Southey, another famous poet, was also a frequent visitor at the castle and he too wrote in Lady Lonsdale's album. A verse he composed about Lowther Castle is as follows:

"Lowther! have I beheld thy stately walls,
Thy pinnacles, and broad embattled brow,
And hospitable halls.
The sun those wide spread battlements shall crest,
And silent years unharming shall go by,
Till centuries in their course invest
Thy towers with sanctity."

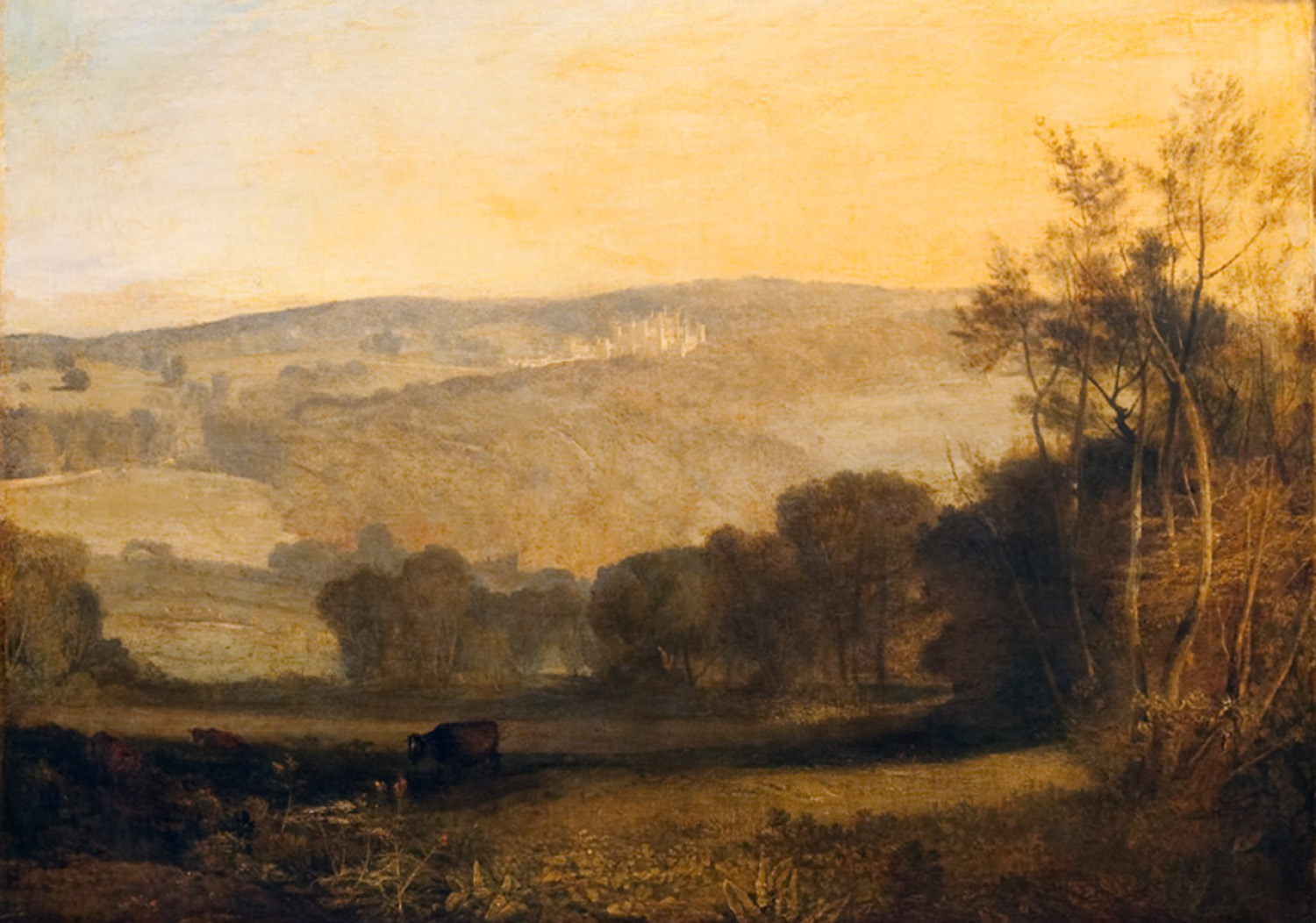
Lowther Castle - Evening, 1810, by J. M. W. Turner

The Earl and Countess also encouraged artists to visit Lowther Castle. The most famous of these was J. M. W. Turner. He painted the recently acquired work called “Lowther Castle – Evening” which hangs in the Bowes Museum. William also became the patron to Jacob Thompson who painted his portrait which is shown above.

George Macartney, when visiting the summer retreat of the Chinese emperor in Chengde in 1793, could compare the magnificence of what he saw only with Lowther Hall: “If any place in England can be said in any respect to have similar features to the western park, which I have seen this day, it is Lowther Hall in Westmoreland, which (when I knew it many years ago) from the extent of prospect, the grand surrounding objects, the noble situation, the diversity of surface, the extensive woods, and command of water, I thought might be rendered by a man of sense, spirit, and taste, the finest scene in the British dominions.”

In 1839 Mrs Harriette Story Paige visited Lowther Castle with Daniel Webster, a famous American politician. A detailed account of her experiences were given in her diary, in which she noted that:

"We reached Lowther just at the hour of lunch, contrary to the English etiquette, which usually establishes the time for arriving, an hour or two only, before dinner, when at the announcement of that meal, the guests meet, for the first time. The Castle bell was rung, as we passed through the arched stone gateway, after a drive through the noble parks."

Daniel Webster's wife also kept a diary and described her experience of the same visit to Lowther Castle.

=== William Lowther, 2nd Earl of Lonsdale ===
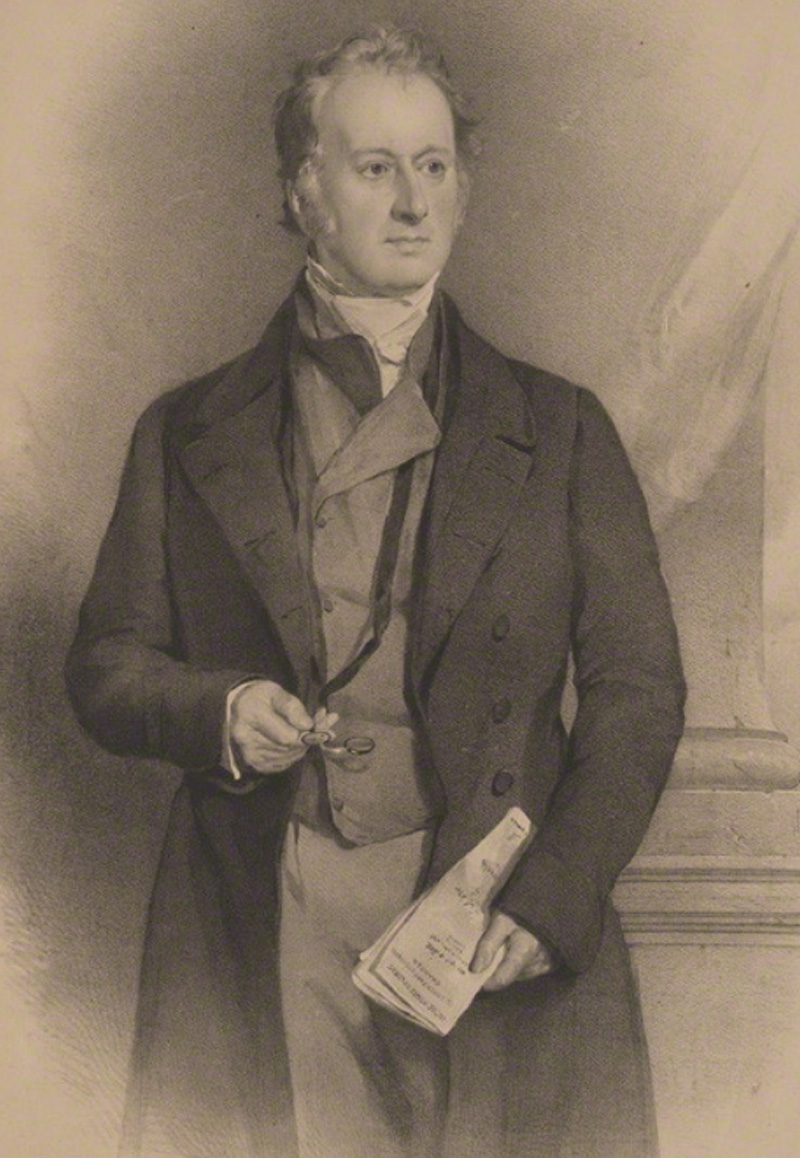
William Lowther 2nd Earl of Lonsdale

William Lowther, 2nd Earl of Lonsdale was born in 1787. He was educated at Harrow School and Cambridge University and in 1808 he followed in his father's footsteps and became a politician. He was an MP for the next 33 years until 1841. In 1844, when his father died, he inherited the Lowther Estates. From 1842 until his death he gathered a remarkable collection of ancient works of art at Lowther Castle, composed of more than 100 pieces of Egyptian, Etruscan, Greek, and mostly Roman sculpture, whose selection reflected the spirit of the collections of the ‘Golden Age of Dilettantism’ during the Victorian era.

Lowther did not marry, but had several illegitimate children. Two of these inherited from him large sums of money on his death. One of these was a daughter, Frances (Fanny) Lowther, born in 1818 to the Paris Opera dancer Pierre-Narcisse Chaspoux. Narcisse later had a liaison with Charles Lewis Meryon and gave birth in 1821 to Charles Meryon, the French artist. Frances Lowther later married the MP Henry Broadwood and had three children.

His other child who was given an inheritance was Francis William Lowther, a Royal Navy officer. He was born in 1841 to Emilia Cresotti, a singer in the Paris Opera. William also appears to have had two other illegitimate daughters. One was Marie Caroline Lowther Saintfal, born in 1818 to Caroline Saintfal and registered in the Paris Baptisms. The other was to the famous French ballerina Lise Noblet, who wrote to him about their daughter.

William died in 1872. As he had no legitimate heirs, the Lowther Estates passed to his nephew Henry Lowther.

=== Henry and Emily Lowther, 3rd Earl and Countess of Lonsdale ===
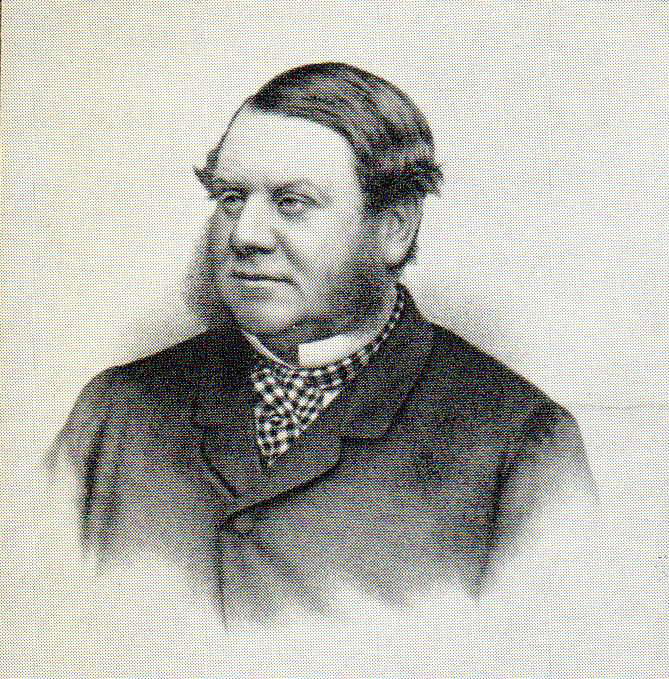
Henry 3rd Earl.

Henry Lowther was 54 years old when he inherited the Lonsdale Estates. He died only four years later after an attack of pneumonia. He therefore had little impact on the development of Lowther Castle.

Henry was born in 1818. He was the nephew of the 2nd Earl of Lonsdale and the eldest son of the Hon. Henry Cecil Lowther, the 2nd Earl's brother. His mother was Lady Lucy Sherard. He was educated at Westminster School and Cambridge University and in 1841 he joined the 1st Life Guards. He was also a Member of Parliament representing West Cumberland between 1847 and 1872.

In 1852 he married Emily Susan Caulfeild, the daughter of St George Caulfeild of Donamon Castle of Roscommon, Ireland. The couple had six children. When Henry died in 1878 the Lowther Estates were inherited by his son St George Lowther who became the 4th Earl of Lonsdale.

=== St George and Gladys, 4th Earl and Countess of Lonsdale ===
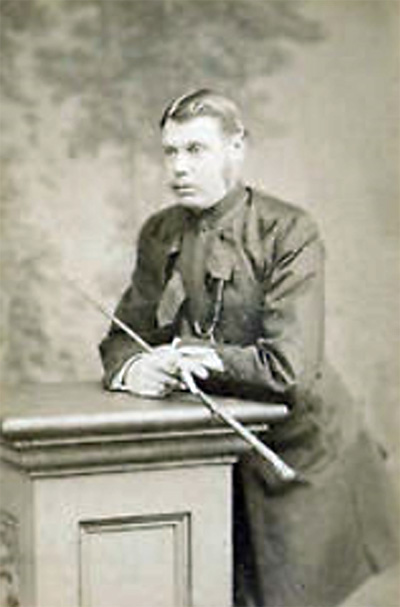
St George Lowther, 4th Earl of Lonsdale

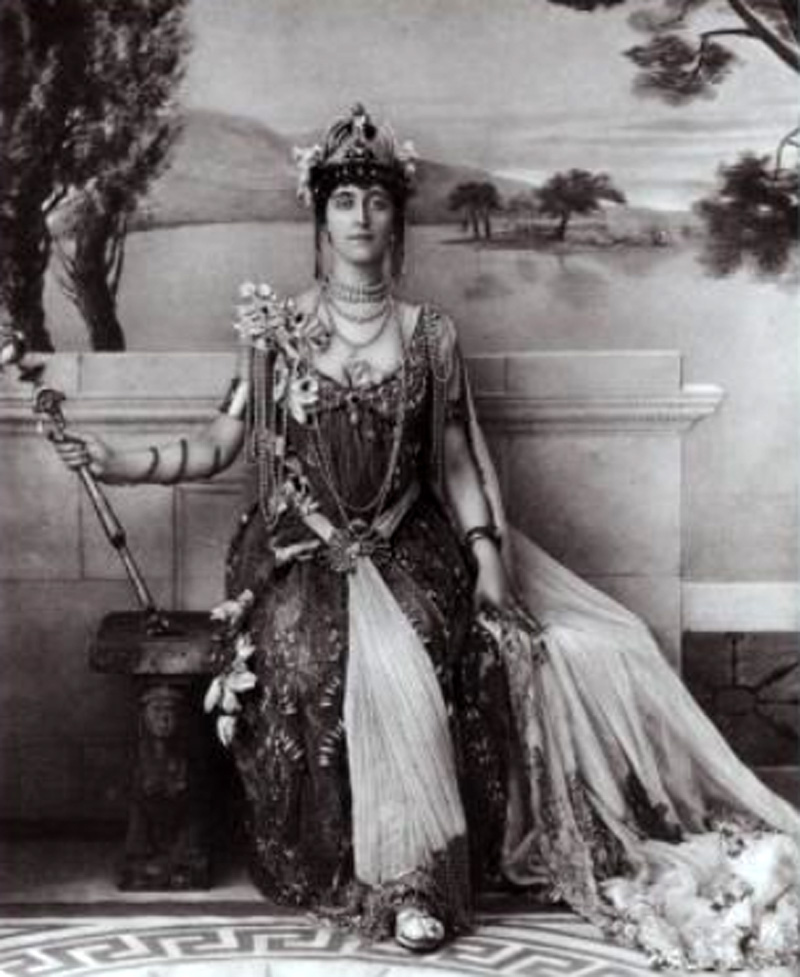
Gladys Countess of Lonsdale

St George was born in 1855 and was only 23 when he inherited Lowther Castle. He had a passion for exploration and when he obtained his fortune he spent much of his time aboard his two steam yachts making long voyages to far parts of the world. He had a scientific interest in the sea, and his careful studies of the behaviour of the Gulf Stream were important enough to be published by the American Hydrological Department.In 1878, he married Lady Gladys Herbert, a prominent socialite. During that period, she and a small group of contemporary society women received widespread media attention and had their portraits made available to the public. Standing six feet tall, she was noted for her striking appearance. The marriage was unsuccessful, largely due to St George's frequent travels and Gladys's involvement in a social circle that he did not approve of"

The marriage was not considered to be a success, as St George was constantly away travelling and Gladys was caught up in a social set which did not meet with his approval. Gladys often entertained at Lowther Castle and one of her visitors was Lillie Langtry, who was said to be the mistress of King Edward VII. In her autobiography Langtry describes her stay at Lowther Castle as follows:

Lady Gladys Herbert and Later Countess of Lonsdale was superbly beautiful, with brilliant colouring and the features and carriage of an ideal Roman Empress. We were great friends and at one time almost inseparable. I spent part of one summer with her at Lowther Castle soon after her first marriage and she met me at Carlisle Station with her pony car to drive me to the Castle. As we wisked through the Park and the impressive walls of Lowther loomed before us she intimated that the one thing she was most anxious for me to see was the emu strutting about the grass.

In 1882, at the age of twenty-six, St George died after a short illness which was followed by pneumonia. His younger brother Hugh Cecil Lowther inherited the castle.

In the 19th century, an East India Company ship HCS Lowther Castle, was named after the estate.

=== Hugh and Grace Lowther, 5th Earl and Countess of Lonsdale ===
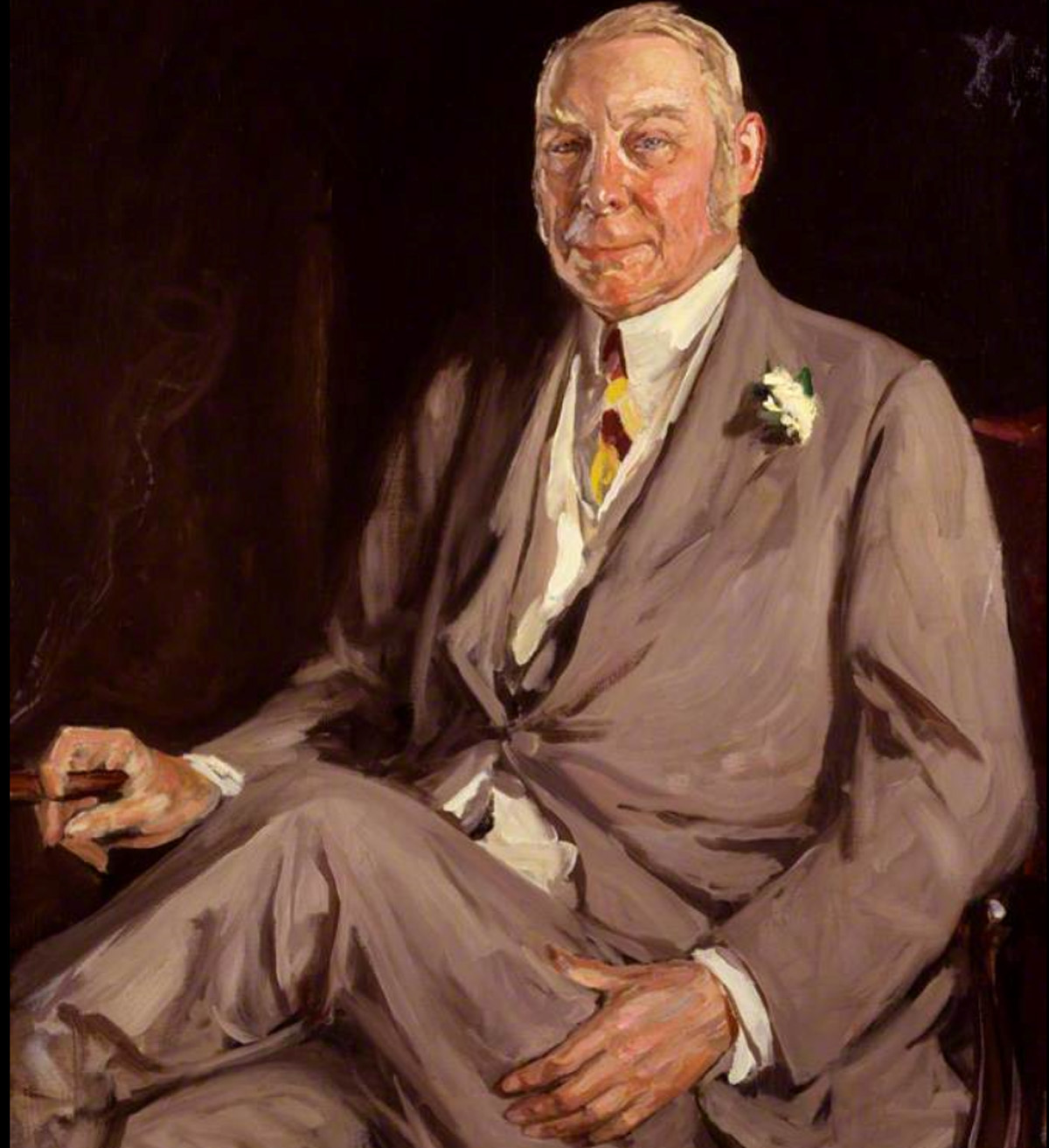
Hugh Lowther, 5th Earl of Lonsdale, by Sir John Lavery

Hugh Cecil Lowther was born in 1857 and was only 25 when he inherited the castle. Being the second son of the Earl, he did not expect to be the manager of an estate, and so had not been appropriately educated. He was at Eton for only two years and left at the age of twelve, after which he spent his time playing sport.

In 1878, four years before obtaining his inheritance, Hugh married Lady Grace Gordon, third daughter of the Marquess of Huntly, who was three years his senior. Her family opposed the marriage, as Hugh was then not wealthy and seemed irresponsible. Their assessment of his character proved to be correct, as the following year he invested a great deal of money in cattle in America. The venture collapsed and the Lowther family was forced to save him.

The couple then lived near Oakham and Grace became pregnant but suffered a bad fall while hunting and lost the baby. After this she was unable to bear children and she remained a partial invalid for the rest of her life.

After he obtained his inheritance in 1882 Hugh indulged his many passions. He bought chestnut horses, carriages and many other extravagances. He had yellow-liveried footmen, a groom of the bedchamber, a chamberlain and a master of music to supervise the 24 musicians who travelled from house to house. His household travelled in a special train. Hugh declared that because of his childlessness he was the last of the Lowthers. This ignored the rights of his younger brother Lancelot, who was to inherit the vastly depleted estate.

In August 1895 the Kaiser visited Lowther Castle for some grouse shooting, and the imperial flag flew over the house. The kings of Italy and Portugal later came to stay, and the Kaiser a second time in 1902. The Kaiser gave Lonsdale the Order of the Crown (first class) and a Mercedes. Hugh's fondness for cars made him the first President of the Automobile Association. He was also the first president of the International Horse Show at Olympia. In 1920 the walls of the Horse Show arena were decorated with a replica of the gardens at Lowther Castle.

During the First World War he helped to found the Blue Cross animal charity, where his chief role was as a recruitment officer of both men and horses. He had his own pals battalion called the Lonsdale battalion (11th Battalion, Border Regiment). The battalion was almost wiped out on the Somme.

After the war Hugh gave up hunting and became more involved with race horses. He became a senior steward of the Jockey Club. He had only one major win and that was the St Leger in 1922. He was rarely seen in the House of Lords.

Because of his extravagance he was forced to sell some of his inherited properties. In 1921 Whitehaven Castle was sold, and in 1926 Barleythorpe Hall in Rutland. The same year the west Cumberland coal mines closed. In 1935 he left Lowther Castle because he could no longer afford to live there, and moved to much smaller accommodation. Grace died in 1941 and three years later in 1944 Hugh died, aged 87.

=== Closure of Lowther Castle ===
In September 1942, the tenants of the Lowther Estate received an invitation to a meeting in Penrith. There they were told their land was to be requisitioned for military use. In October of that year, a column of Matilda tanks arrived in the grounds of the castle. In a highly secret operation, tank regiments were using the grounds of Lowther Castle to develop the Canal Defence Light.

Hugh Lowther was the last resident of Lowther Castle. His brother Lancelot, the 6th Earl, inherited the estate in 1944; but because of Hugh's large debts he was forced to sell many of the family's treasures. A large auction sale was held in 1947. Lancelot died in 1953 and was succeeded by James, his grandson.

James wished to develop the estates, and concentrated on farming. He saw Lowther Castle as an extravagance. After he returned from World War II, he said “it was a place that exemplified gross imperial decadence during a period of abject poverty". The army had damaged the grounds and buildings during the war, and the castle had been empty for many years. James offered the castle as a gift to three local authorities, but all refused. At that time the only options for large country houses were to open them to the public or to demolish them. Faced with £25 million in death duties, he could not afford the former, so he decided to remove the roof and demolish much of the stonework. "Just the façade and outer walls remained", according to the castle's owner.

The forecourt became pig pens; and the concrete on the south lawns that the army had laid he used as a base for a broiler chicken factory. The remainder of the gardens was used as a timber plantation, with Sitka spruce trees.

Significant improvements have been achieved since then. After the death of Lord Lonsdale in 2006, the chicken-broiler unit and the trees were removed. With a great deal of funding from various sources, some garden restoration was done and a restoration of the castle shell and the full reinstatement and conversion of the stables was also completed.

== Early 20th century ==
The gardens of Lowther Castle were abandoned in 1935 but before that they represented centuries of careful cultivation by successive generations of the Lowther family. There exists a detailed description of the gardens written in the lifetime of the 5th Earl, who was the last person to live at the Castle. The description divides the western side of the castle into the Rock Garden, Sweet Scented Garden, and the Japanese Garden. The Japanese Garden was created by local gardener Thomas Richard Hayes in 1904. A local expert in rock and water garden design, Hayes imported trees from Japan and used pools, curved bridges and statues of water birds to create an authentic feel. Dawson continues his description, looking at The Terrace and then the gardens to the east of the castle including Hugh's Garden and Jack Croft's Pond.

== Conservation and reopening ==
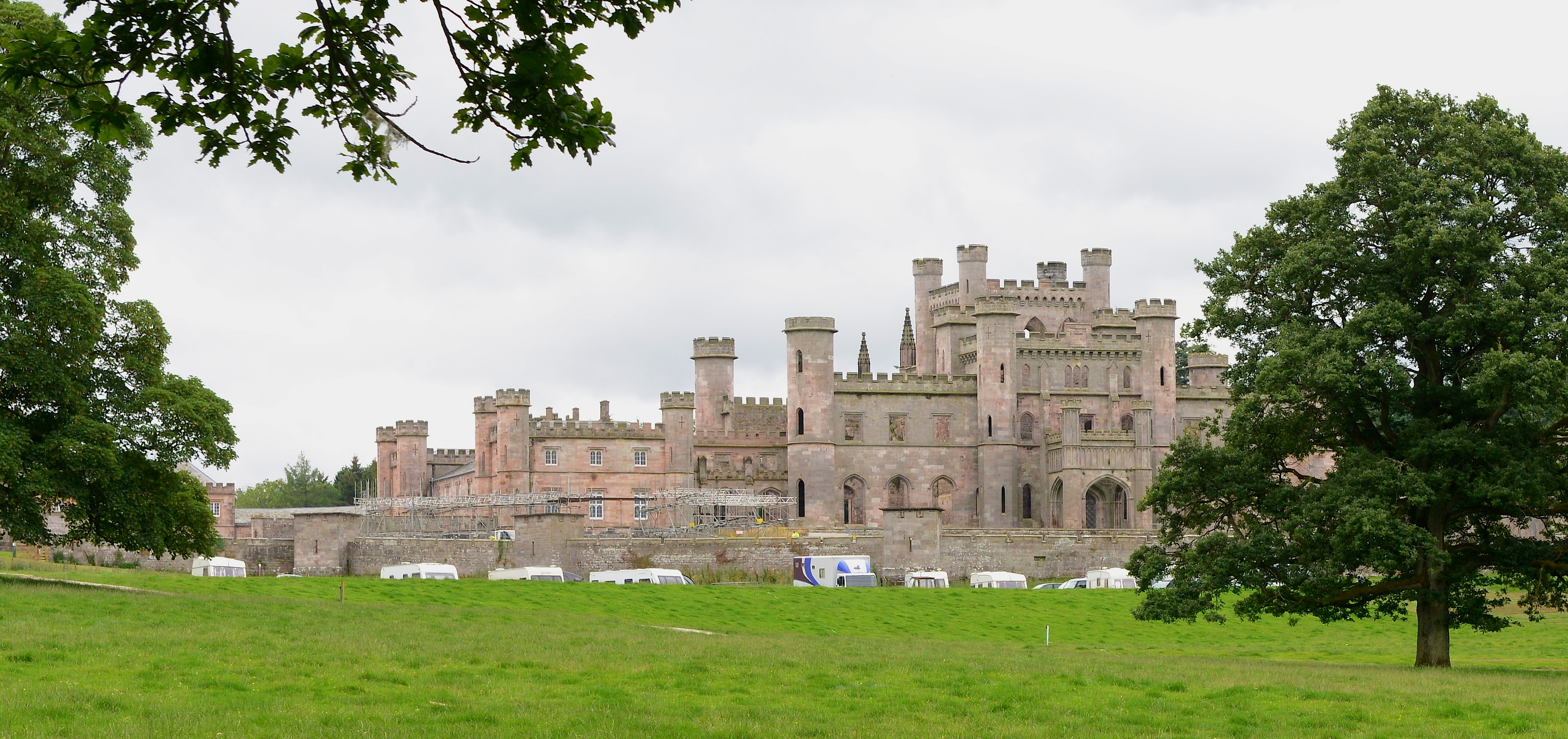
Lowther Castle in 2015

In 2000 the Lowther Estate and English Heritage jointly commissioned a team of historians, landscapers, architects and engineers to review the status of the castle and its grounds, and they produced the Lowther Castle & Garden Conservation Plan. In 2005 the estate formed an informal partnership with the Northwest Development Agency, English Heritage, Cumbria Vision and the Royal Horticultural Society to regenerate the site. The objectives were to consolidate the ruin, restore the 50-acre (200,000 m^{2}) garden and open the site to the public. Sheppard Robson RIBA were appointed as architects. The castle and 130 acres of grounds were transferred to a charity called the Lowther Castle and Gardens Trust in 2007 and the site opened to the public on 22 April 2011.

After an initial £9 million consolidation, the castle and some gardens opened for public visits in 2011, for the first time since 1938; other garden areas were still overgrown at that time.

In 2016, the Lowther family again began to manage the property in advance of the official reopening for the 2017 season. In March 2016 the property was sub-leased to Lowther Castle Limited, a non-charitable company formed to manage the activities undertaken at the Castle and Gardens. In summer 2016, The Lost Castle, the largest wooden playground in the country, was opened at Lowther Castle. The hand-built playground is made from 11 miles of sustainably sourced timber.

A report in October 2018 summarised the situation at that time as follows: "The part-demolished castle shell and the wrecked garden have been resurrected with impressive energy and conviction. Lowther is now once again one of the leading showplaces of Cumbria." In the same year, the property was cited as the Large Visitor Attraction of the Year 2018 in the Cumbria Tourism Awards.

Developments in the gardens continue. Work on the 130-acre garden was continuing in mid-2019, based on plans by Patrick James and Dominic Cole, under the guidance of designer Dan Pearson and the castle's current owner Jim Lowther (son of the 7th Earl of Lonsdale).

One of the projects is the Garden in the Ruin, a new phase after the 2015 plantings, including Hydrangea aspera Sargentiana and Parthenocissus henryana. The new Rose Garden had already received 1,250 eglantine roses, underplanted with brunnera, Galium odoratum and Chaerophyllum hirsutum Roseum; in spring 2019, 6,000 perennials were added, white Geranium macrorrhizum White-Ness, Calamintha sylvatica Menthe and Brunnera macrophylla Betty Bowring and Narcissus poeticus and Camassia leichtlinii alba.

In late 2019, an additional 2,255 David Austin roses were to be planted. Future phases will include the addition of Japanese plants in The Japanese Garden and the conversion of the Scented Garden to Katsura Grove. The area around an old summer house to the west of the garden will be planted with honeysuckle, roses and bulbs. The modified gardens were planned to open to visitors in spring 2020. In June 2022, Andrea Brunsendorf was appointed head gardener.

== Events ==
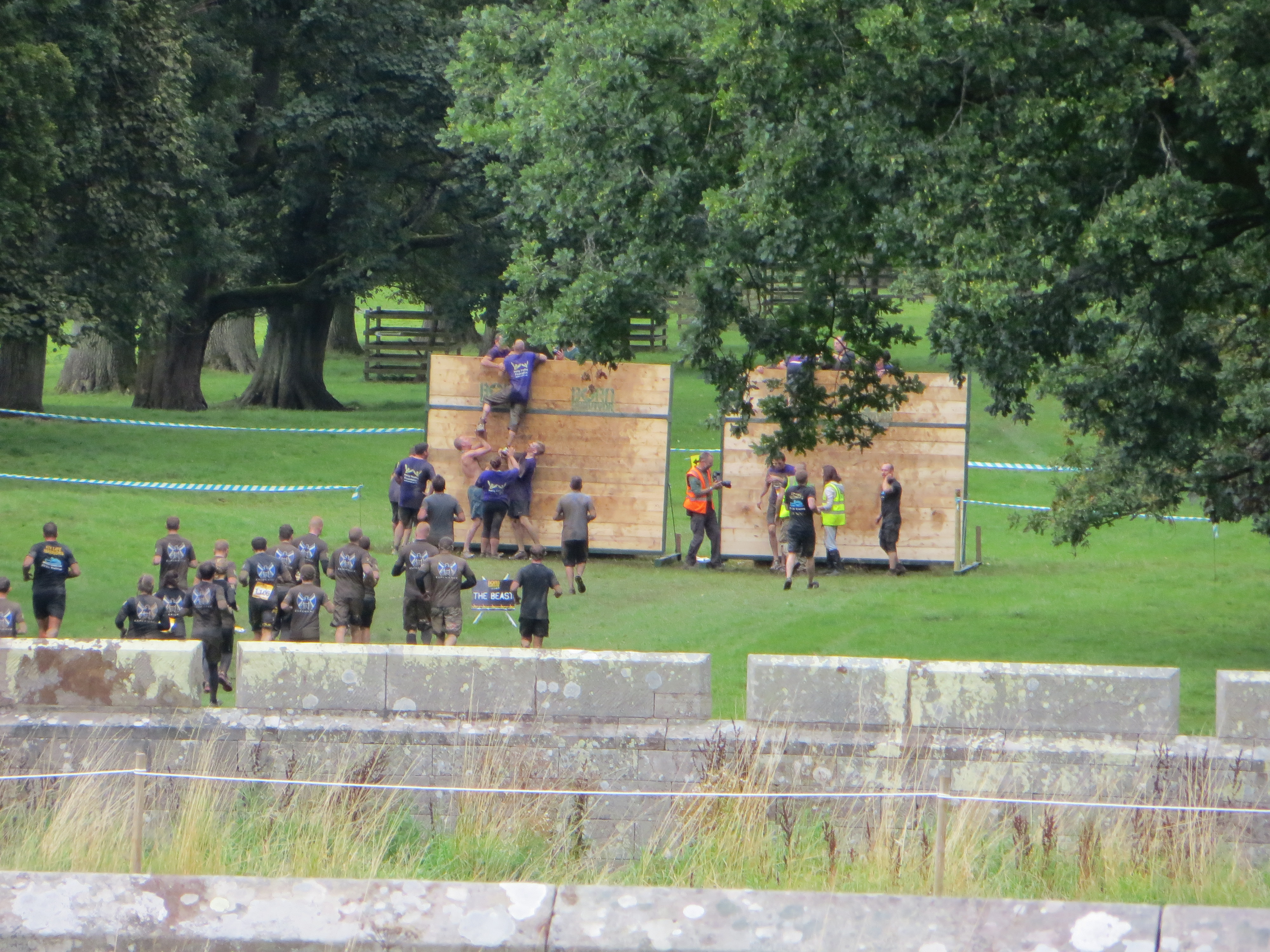
One of the obstacles at Born Survivor - 10 kilometres (6.2 mi) endurance event at Lowther Castle, Cumbria

Lowther Deer Park hosts the music festival Kendal Calling, and Born Survivor, a 10 kilometres (6.2 mi) obstacle run.

== Transport ==
Two bus routes serve the castle, both run by Stagecoach. The first is UB2 to Aira Force. The second is the 106 to Shap or Penrith.

== See also ==
- Askham, Cumbria

== Sources ==
- Blainey, Ann (2009). I Am Melba. Black Inc, Melbourne. ISBN 978-1863953672.
- Collins, Roger (1999). Charles Meryon: A Life. Garton and Co. ISBN 978-0906030356.
- Dawson, Lionel (1946). Lonsdale. The Authorised Life of Hugh Lowther, Fifth Earl of Lonsdale.
- Langtry, Lillian (2000). The Days I Knew. Panoply Publications, North Hollywood. ISBN 978-1886571136.
- Sutherland, Douglas (1966). The Yellow Earl: The life of Hugh Lowther, 5th Earl of Lonsdale. Cassel and Company, London. ISBN 978-1910723036.
- Story Paige, Harriette (1839). Daniel Webster in England. Houghton Mifflin Company.
