= Annie Bradshaw =

English novelist and animal welfare activist (1859–1938)

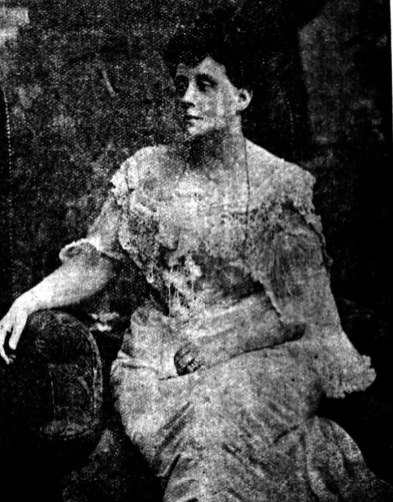
- Bradshaw, c. 1908
- Born: Annie Cropper; 1859; Nottingham, England
- Died: 23 May 1938 (aged 78–79); Notting Hill, London, England
- Other names: Anne M. Tree; Mrs. Albert S. Bradshaw
- Occupations: Novelist; elocutionist; activist
- Spouse: Albert Septimus Bradshaw (m. 1881; died 1914)
- Children: 1

Annie Cropper Bradshaw (born Annie Cropper; 1859 – 23 May 1938), who wrote under the names Anne M. Tree and Mrs. Albert S. Bradshaw, was an English novelist, elocutionist and animal welfare activist. She was active in Our Dumb Friends' League for many years and co-founded the Performing Animals' Defence League.

== Life ==
Annie Cropper was born in 1859 and was raised in Nottingham. Her father was John Cropper a literacy man. She married Albert Septimus Bradshaw in 1881 and their son Vernon was born in 1883. Albert was the proprietor of the Nottingham Journal which his father had founded a century before. He died in 1914.

Bradshaw's poem "Good-bye, Old Man" written during WW1 with a musical setting by Frederic Dale for the Blue Cross Fund sold well. All profits from the publisher Reynolds of Berners Street were given to the fund. Bradshaw used the pseudonym Anne M. Tree. She authored many novels. She died on 23 May 1938.

== Animal welfare ==
Bradshaw was known for her work on promoting the cause of animal protection. In 1909, she was a speaker at the International Congress of the World League for the Protection of Animals. She stated that horrible atrocities were perpetrated on performing animals and it is a fallacy to assume they are trained with kindness.

She co-founded the Performing Animals' Defence League with Ernest Bell in 1914. She gave evidence in the House of Commons and supported the passing of a Bill dealing with the prohibition of performing animals. Bradshaw argued that performing animals were abused by their trainers by being forced to do more clever and difficult tricks each year to satisfy public demand and that the animals were starved, beaten or whipped. Bradshaw sat on the executive committee of the Performing Animals' Defence League. She was highly critical of Lord Lonsdale a patron of the Performing Animals Defence League but also a supporter of the circus. In 1923, Bradshaw and others called for his resignation. In 1923, she commented that "supporters of the League could not understand why Lord Lonsdale should be a patron of a society to put down performances which he upheld. The League is against performing animals of any kind". In the late 1920s, the League changed name to the Performing and Captive Animals Defence League.

Bradshaw was an anti-vivisectionist and vegetarian. She was a vegetarian for ethical reasons and spoke out against animal suffering in slaughterhouses. She was a vice-president of the London Vegetarian Society. In 1911, she was a speaker at the Croydon Vegetarian Society's annual dinner. In 1912 Bradshaw, Alexandra Avierino and E. Douglas Hume attended the London Vegetarian Society's bazaar and "Humane Dress Fair" at the Memorial Hall on Farringdon Street. They all wore "humane furs and feathers" which did not involve the death or pain of any creature. Non-leather boots were shown at the fair and a special vegetarian Christmas dinner was served.

Bradshaw was an activist for Our Dumb Friends' League for many years. She was described in the Westminster Gazette as "perhaps the best known and most whole-hearted supporter of our dumb friends in the country". In 1905, she authored a pamphlet for the League titled Performing Animals and Their Treatment. In 1910, she received a gold medal from the League for six years of her work. In 1923, Bradshaw and several other members accused the League's Ground Council of animal neglect as their North London Dog's Home was in an "insanitary and disgraceful condition". A public protest was held at the Mortimer Hall off Regent Street in which the Grand Council were asked to reply to the allegations. Bradshaw aimed to reform the League and was a leading member of its Reform Committee.

In 1925, Bradshaw and other members accused the League of mismanaging funds. The allegation was that funds had been extravagantly administered and improperly spent. They called into question an item of £188 for the funeral of the late secretary Arthur Coke, as the expense was paid without authority from the League. The late secretary was on a salary of £600 with bonuses. The then current secretary F. Russell Roberts was also on an annual salary of £600. Lord Lonsdale president of the League denied all allegations. The case went to court.

The legal outcome was a report from the Committee of Inquiry into the management of the League. The report found that "several irregularities of procedure under the regulations of the Grand Council of Our Dumb Friends' League were proved to have occurred". The payments made for the late secretary's funeral were found to be excessive but the evidence given "did not prove any extravagance in the administration of the general fund of the League". The report concluded that there had been no misapplication of funds. The report also noted that the North London Dog's Home was now in a "sanitary and satisfactory condition". It was suggested that an executive committee not exceeding 12 in number should be formed and annually elected by the Grand Council. Bradshaw remained active with the League in the 1930s.

== Selected publications ==
Bradshaw authored many novels; a list was compiled in Who Was Who in Literature, 1906-1934.

- A Crimson Stain (1885)
- False Gods: A Novel (1887)
- Wife or Slave? (1890)
- The Gates of Temptation: A Natural Novel (Minerva Publishing, 1892)
- Ashes Tell No Tales (1906)
- The Rags of Morality (1911)
- Murder at the Boarding House (1936)
