= Irish Blue Cross =

Animal welfare charity for the Greater Dublin area

- Predecessor: Blue Cross United Kingdom
- Formation: 1945
- Registration no.: Charity Number: 20203128
- Purpose: animal welfare
- Headquarters: Inchicore, Dublin, Ireland
- Origins: To prevent the live exportation of Irish horses to the continent for slaughter
- Services: Offering affordable veterinary care to eligible owners; promoting welfare and responsible pet ownership; alleviating the suffering of animals through veterinary clinics and equine ambulances
- CEO: Chris Conneely
- Website: www.bluecross.ie

The Irish Blue Cross is an animal welfare charity formed in Ireland in 1945 by incorporating the welfare charity "Our Dumb Friends' League" into a new small animal and equine welfare organisation. The charity provides low-cost veterinary services to people on a low income in the greater Dublin area.

== Services ==
The Irish Blue Cross provides low-cost veterinary services to pet owners on a low income in the greater Dublin area. In 2022, 12,250 veterinary treatments were provided by the Blue Cross clinic in Inchicore, and mobile teams treated 2,382 pets and vaccinated 2,572 pets.

Since 1945, it has provided care to over 600,000 pets.

=== Mobile veterinary clinics ===
The Irish Blue Cross put its first Mobile Van veterinary clinic onto the streets of Dublin in 1953. The mobile service was founded by Niall Murphy MRCVS. He was a very compassionate and well respected veterinary surgeon who worked in small animal practice and went on to establish the first veterinary hospital in Dublin, at that time in 28 Dartmouth Road, Dun Laoghaire, County Dublin. He studied and at times taught Veterinary Sciences in Trinity College Dublin.

Ten Blue Cross mobile veterinary clinics are in operation weekly throughout Dublin and are staffed and operated by a dedicated volunteer force of vets, drivers and helpers.

== Support and grants ==
The Irish Blue Cross relies on donations from the general public to cover the costs of carrying out its work. It has many fundraising events throughout the year, such as its Easter Raffle, World Animal Week pens campaign, and its ever-popular Bark in the Park™ sponsored dog walks during the Summer. The Bark in the Park™ events involve a 4 km walk through some of Dublin's finest parks, a raffle, music, goody bags and prizes for the dog with the Best Bark, Shiniest Coat, Happiest Smile and Waggiest Tail.

The charity also receives some funding from the Department of Rural and Community Development and the Gaeltacht and the Department of Agriculture, Food and the Marine. Each year, Dublin City Council and other local authorities also give significant grant aid to the charity.

== Horse ambulance services ==
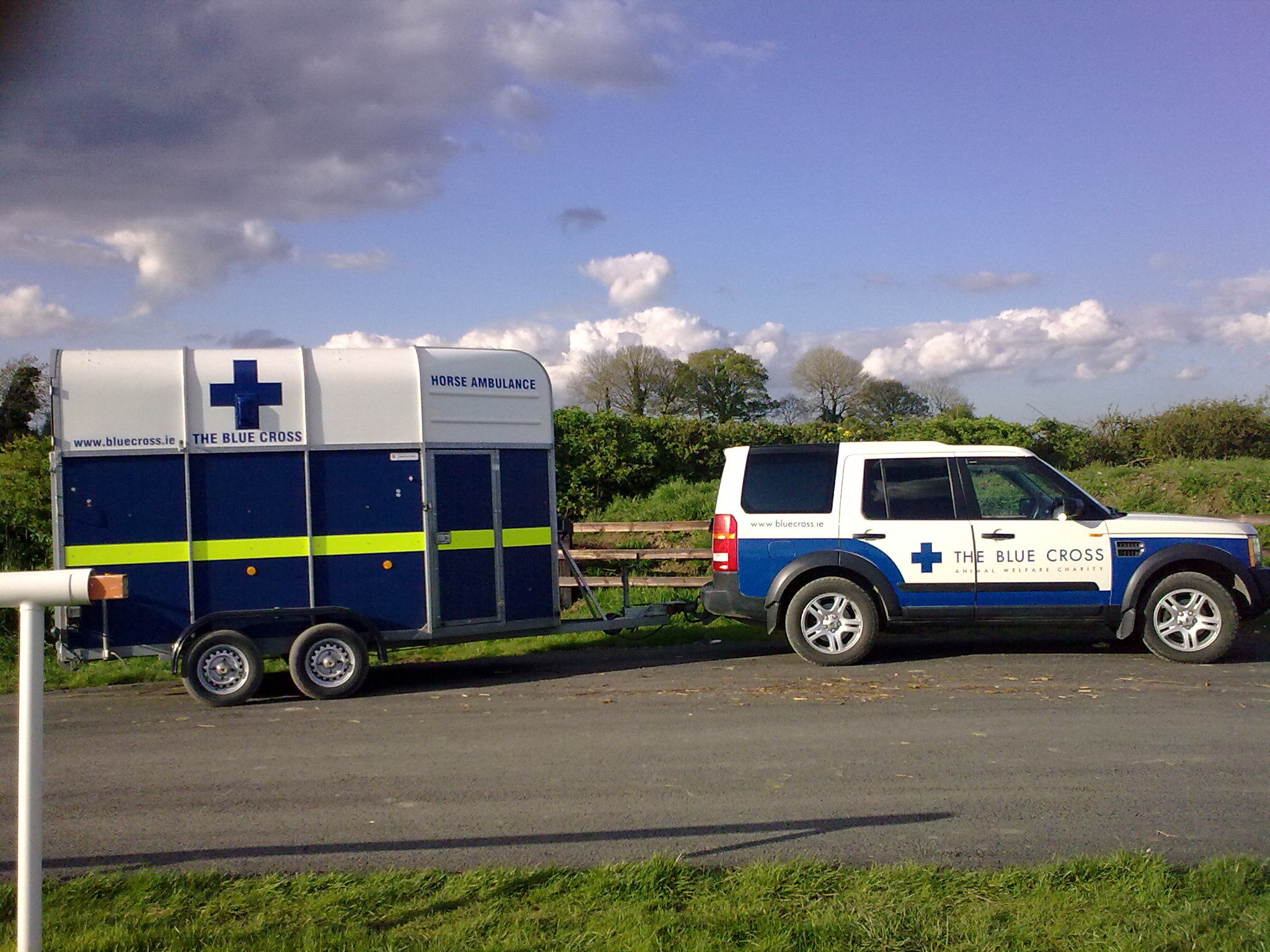
Blue Cross horse ambulance

The Irish Blue Cross also operates a horse ambulance service that attends at all Irish racecourses, north and south. In an average year, the frontline fleet of three ambulance units provides about 400 days of service. Experienced staff work closely with racecourse veterinary surgeons to assist racehorses 'pulled up' or injured during the course of racing. This service is not paid for from the charity donations provided to the small animal section of The Irish Blue Cross, rather it is separately funded by Horse Racing Ireland and other racing organizations and equine welfare specific donations from some users, horse racing and associated industries. The Irish Blue Cross horse ambulances are also to be seen at the RDS Annual Horse Show, International Horse Trials in Ireland, and some Point-to-Points.

The Irish Blue Cross branded horse ambulance units are a regular sight on Irish roads travelling to and from race meetings; have a standing commitment allowing them to provide three fully equipped units at events on any one day, and in exceptional circumstances, utilizing reserve equipment, they can provide up to five units on a single day if necessary.

In recent years the horse ambulance fleet have also provided services to the Irish film industry (when scenes involving large numbers of horses or specific stunts are being filmed). Occasionally (and unfortunately) Irish Blue Cross units have had to attend road traffic accidents involving horses injured on the public road, either in collision with vehicles or from incidents involving horseboxes or trailers.
