= Olive Smith-Dorrien =

Creator of hospital bag fund World War I

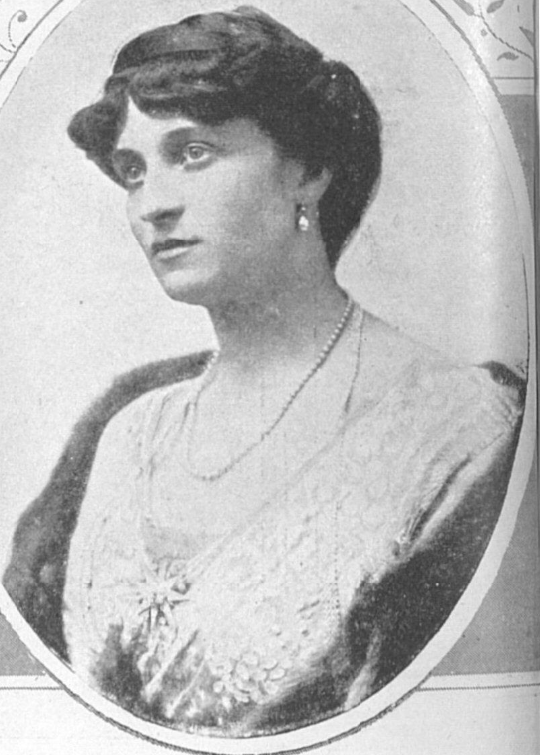
- Born: Olive Crofton Schneider; 26 February 1881; Kensington
- Died: 15 September 1951 (aged 70); Chelsea
- Occupation: Activist
- Spouse: Horace Smith-Dorrien (m. 1902)

Dame Olive Crofton Smith-Dorrien DBE (née Schneider; 26 February 1881 – 15 September 1951) was the wife of Horace Smith-Dorrien, known for setting up the Lady Smith-Dorrien's Hospital Bag Fund. She was also president of the Blue Cross Fund and the Royal School of Needlework.

== Biography ==
Olive Crofton Schneider was born on 26 February 1881 in the Kensington district of London. Her father was Colonel John Schneider. In 1902 she married Horace Smith-Dorrien. They had three sons, two of whom predeceased their mother:

- Grenfell Horace Gerald Smith-Dorrien (1904-1944) served in the army, reaching the rank of brigadier. He was killed by shellfire on 13 September 1944 during the Italian Campaign, whilst commanding the 169th (London) Infantry Brigade. His grave is in the Gradara War Cemetery, in the Commune of Gradara in the Province of Pesaro and Urbino.
- Peter Lockwood Smith-Dorrien (1907-1946) was killed in the King David Hotel bombing on 22 July 1946.
- Bromley Davis Smith-Dorrien (29 October 1911 – 11 February 2001) He joined the Foresters in 1940. After the war, he worked to keep alive his father's reputation, designing a first-day cover commemorating the Battle of Le Cateau and helping his father's biographer A. J. Smithers.

Horace and Olive Smith-Dorrien informally adopted Power Palmer's two daughters (Frances Gabrielle and Celia de Courcy), who were left homeless after his second wife's death in 1912.

== Lady Smith-Dorrien's Hospital Bag Fund ==
During the Great War, she founded the Lady Smith-Dorrien's Hospital Bag Fund. After hearing in April 1915 that it was hard to safeguard wounded soldiers' valuables while they were in hospitals. She wrote to her husband, offering to sew bags for soldiers to hold their valuables in. The assistant director of medical services of the Second Army responded, requesting 50,000 such bags. Though work began in her own home, the fund expanded in 1916 and again in 1917. At its peak, 12,000 people worked for the Fund, in the United Kingdom and the United States. Volunteers for the fund sewed between 40,000 and 60,000 bags a month to hold soldiers' valuables.

By 1 January 1918, the fund had distributed over 2,500,000 bags. Estimates range as high as five million bags by the end of the war. Her work continued even after Horace Smith-Dorrien was removed from his command.

She was created a Dame Commander of the Order of the British Empire (DBE). She also served as President of Our Dumb Friends' League's Blue Cross Fund, working to alleviate the suffering of war horses. For her services as president of the Blue Cross Fund, she received the gold medal of the Reconnaissance française.

In 1932, Olive Smith-Dorrien was named principal of the Royal School of Needlework (RSN). In 1937, the RSN worked on the Queen's Train (Coronation Robe), canopy and the two chairs to be used in Westminster Abbey during the Coronation, for which she received the King George VI Coronation Medal.

The Fund reopened in 1940 during the Second World War. During the war, she was president of the Clothing Branch of the Officers' Families Fund and chairman of Soldiers', Sailors', and Airmen's Families Association Central Clothing Depot. During the Second World War, she also led the Royal School of Needlework in collecting lace which was sold for the war effort.

== Death ==
Horace Smith-Dorrien died on 12 August 1930 following injuries sustained in a car accident at Chippenham, Wiltshire; he was 72 years old. He was buried at the Three Close Lane Cemetery of St Peter's Church, Berkhamsted, Hertfordshire.

Dame Olive Smith-Dorrien outlived her husband by more than twenty years. She died on 15 September 1951 in Chelsea, London.
