= Hugh Lowther, 5th Earl of Lonsdale =

English peer and sportsman (1857–1944)

The Right Honourable The Earl of Lonsdale KG GCVO DL
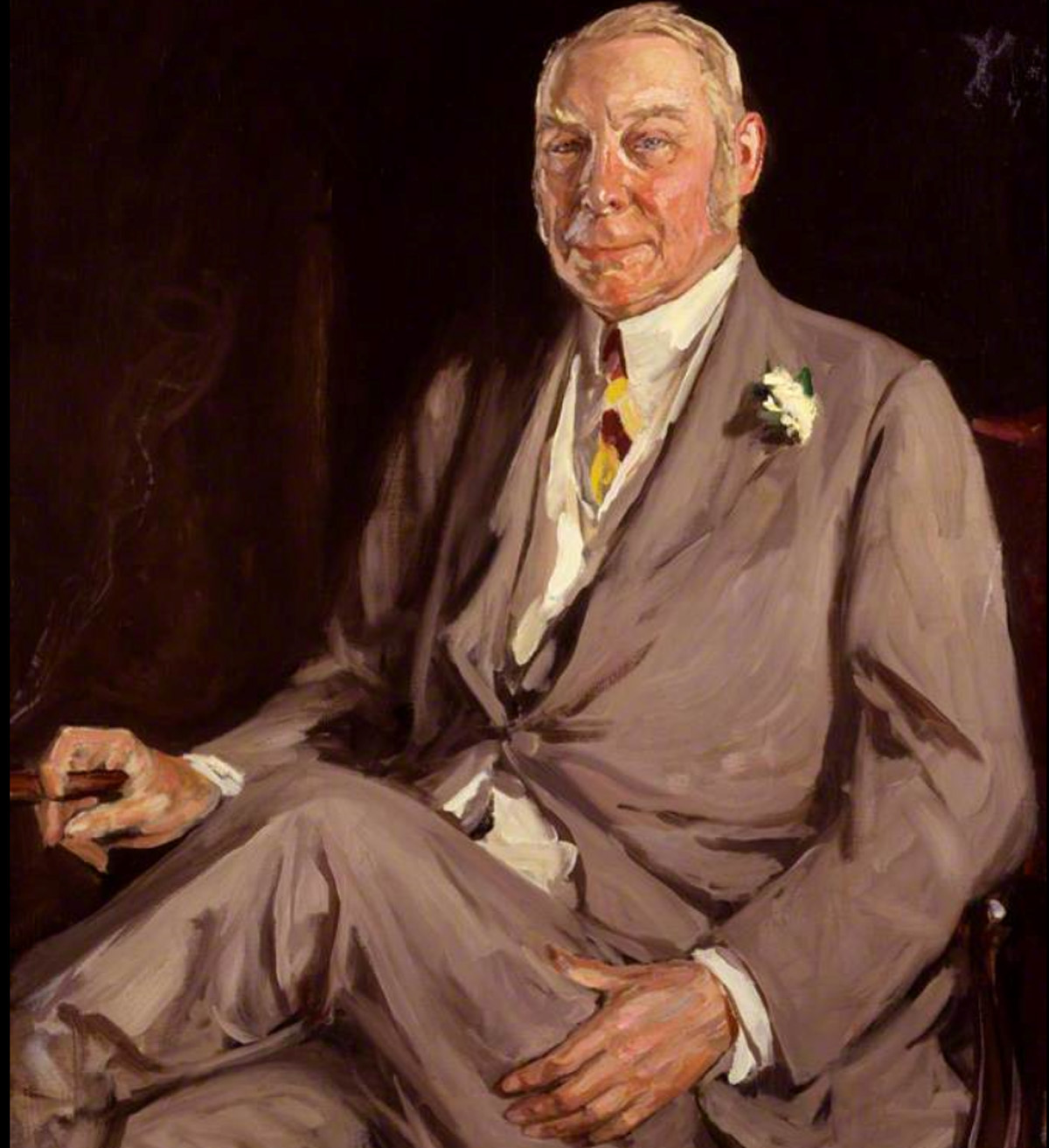
- 1930 portrait by Sir John Lavery

Lord Lieutenant of Cumberland
- In office 1917–1944
- Preceded by: The Lord Muncaster
- Succeeded by: Frescheville Hubert Ballantine-Dykes

Personal details
- Born: Hugh Cecil Lowther; 25 January 1857 London, Middlesex, England
- Died: 13 April 1944 (aged 87) Stud House, Barleythorpe
- Spouse: Lady Grace Cecilie Gordon (m. 1878; died 1941)
- Relations: St George Lowther, 4th Earl of Lonsdale (brother); Lancelot Lowther, 6th Earl of Lonsdale (brother)
- Parents: Henry Lowther, 3rd Earl of Lonsdale (father); Emily Susan Caulfeild (mother)

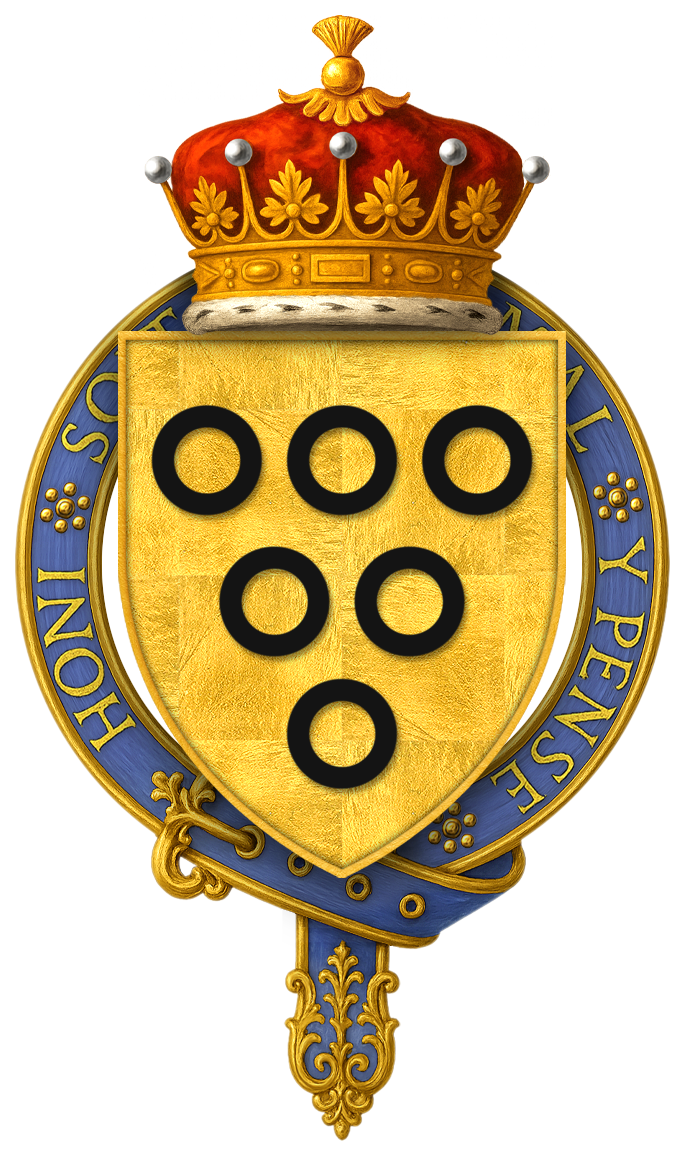
Garter-encircled shield of arms of Hugh Lowther, 5th Earl of Lonsdale, KG, GCVO, DL

Hugh Cecil Lowther, 5th Earl of Lonsdale, KG, GCVO, DL (25 January 1857–13 April 1944) was an English peer and sportsman. He was president of Bertram Mills Olympia Circus and a vice-president of the RSPCA.

== Early life ==
Born in 1857, he was the second son of Emily Susan (née Caulfeild), daughter of St George Francis Caulfeild of Donamon Castle of Roscommon, Ireland and Henry Lowther, 3rd Earl of Lonsdale.

In 1882, he succeeded his brother, St George Lowther, 4th Earl of Lonsdale, and was succeeded in turn by his brother, Lancelot Lowther, 6th Earl of Lonsdale upon his death in 1944.

== Career ==
Lonsdale inherited enormous wealth derived from his father's Cumberland coalmines, and owned 75,000 acres (30,000 ha) of land. He had residences at Lowther Castle, at Whitehaven Castle, Barleythorpe and Carlton House Terrace, London.

He was appointed Lieutenant-Colonel in command of the Westmorland and Cumberland Yeomanry on 3 March 1897 and from February 1900 to 1901, he was Assistant Adjutant-General for the Imperial Yeomanry during the first part of the Second Boer War. He became Honorary Colonel of the Westmorland and Cumberland Yeomanry on 16 November 1908, shortly after it had transferred to the Territorial Force. During World War I his chief role was as a recruitment officer of both men and horses. He formed his own pals battalion, the Lonsdales (11th Battalion, Border Regiment). He helped found Our Dumb Friends League (now the Blue Cross) and was its chairman during the war.

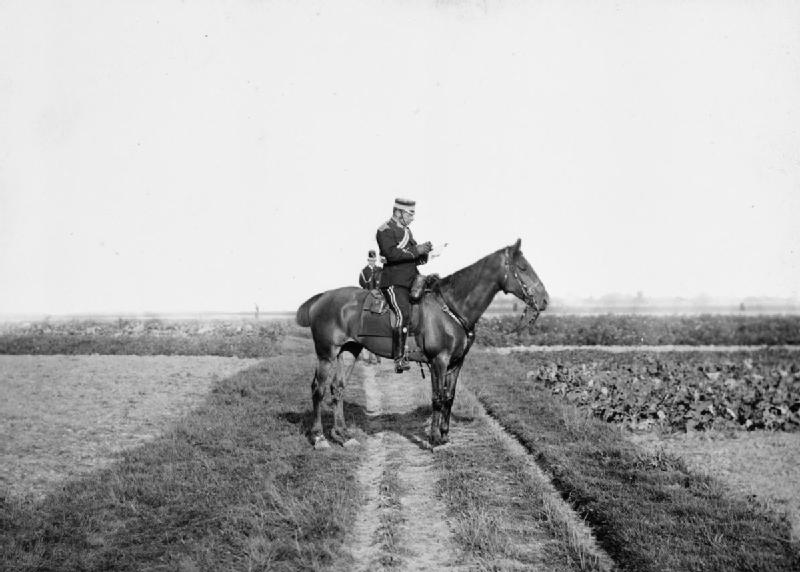
Lonsdale wearing the undress uniform of the Westmorland and Cumberland Yeomanry during the Imperial German Army manoeuvres of 1902

Lonsdale was known as the Yellow Earl for his penchant for the colour. He was a founder and first president of the Automobile Association (AA) which adopted his livery.

In 1907, Lonsdale was part of the famous wager with John Pierpont Morgan over whether a man could circumnavigate the globe and remain unidentified.

In August 1895 the German Emperor Wilhelm II visited Lowther Castle for some grouse shooting. The kings of Italy and Portugal later came to stay, and the Kaiser a second time in 1902. The Kaiser conferred upon the Earl a knighthood of the first class of the Order of the Prussian Crown.

Lowther was appointed a Knight Grand Cross of the Royal Victorian Order (GCVO) in the 1925 Birthday Honours.

Although he was a Peer, he was rarely seen in the House of Lords. Because of his extravagance he was forced to sell some of his inherited properties. In 1921 Whitehaven Castle was sold, and in 1926 Barleythorpe. The same year the west Cumberland coalmines closed. In 1935 he moved from Lowther Castle because he could no longer afford to live there and moved to much smaller accommodation.

His free-spending had largely wrecked the estate, and his heir, his brother Lancelot, the 6th Earl was forced to auction off the contents of Lowther Castle in 1947. This proved to be the largest English country house sale of the 20th century.

== Personal life ==
In 1878, before obtaining his inheritance, Lonsdale married Lady Grace Cecilie Gordon, third daughter of Maria Antoinetta Pegus (c. 1821–1893) and Charles Gordon, 10th Marquess of Huntly. Her family opposed the marriage as Lonsdale was not then wealthy and seemed irresponsible. This proved to be correct as the following year he invested in cattle in America; the venture collapsed and the Lowther family was forced to save him.

The couple then lived at Barleythorpe Hall near Oakham. Grace became pregnant but had a miscarriage after a fall while hunting. After this she was unable to bear children and remained a partial invalid for the rest of her life. She died in 1941.

After an affair with the actress Violet Cameron caused a scandal, Lonsdale set out in 1888 to explore the Arctic regions of Canada as far north as Melville Island, nearly dying before reaching Kodiak, Alaska in 1889 and returning to England. His collection of Inuit artefacts that he assembled during his explorations in Alaska and north-west Canada at this time is now in the British Museum.

Lonsdale died in 1944 at Stud House, Barleythorpe, aged 87.

=== Sports ===
Lonsdale was a founding member and first president of the National Sporting Club, and donated the original Lonsdale Belts in 1909 for the boxing championship trophy. His name was later given to the Lonsdale clothing brand of boxing garments and the Lonsdale cigar size.

He was also a director of Arsenal Football Club and served as chairman for a brief period in 1936, and later became the club's honorary president.

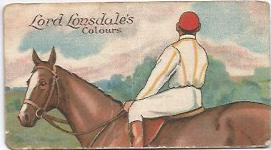
Lonsdale's racing colours by E & W Anstie Ltd cigarette card (1922)

After the First World War, Hugh gave up hunting and became more involved with race horses. He became a senior steward of the Jockey Club. He had two major wins with his colt Royal Lancer in 1922, the St Leger and the Irish St Leger. He was also the first president of the International Horse Show at Olympia.

From 1929 Lonsdale was the joint editor of the Lonsdale Library of Sports, Games and Pastimes, a book series published by Seeley, Service and Co.

== Views on animals ==
Lonsdale enjoyed foxhunting, serving as Master of the Quorn from 1893 to 1898 and of the Cottesmore Hunt for long periods. In the 1920s, Lonsdale frequently attended circus animal training sessions. He defended Bertram Mills' use of circus animals against allegations of cruelty. He was president of Mills Olympia Circus.

He was a vice-president of the RSPCA which caused controversy amongst some RSPCA members due to his support of performance animals. Stephen Coleridge for example called for his resignation. However, the council of the RSPCA noted that membership "does not compel the adoption of any particular policy in regard to matters not yet included within the scope of animal protection acts" and did not request for Lonsdale to resign.

Lonsdale was president of Our Dumb Friends' League for 20 years. His re-election in 1924 was controversial due to his support of the rodeo and he was booed at the annual meeting in Westminster. Annie Bradshaw and Lady Lumb opposed his re-election. Lonsdale resigned in 1930.

== In popular culture ==
Lonsdale was the subject of a biography by Douglas Sutherland.

Lonsdale appears in the 2025 TV series A Thousand Blows, portrayed by Adam Nagaitis.

Peerage of the United Kingdom
Preceded by St George Lowther	Earl of Lonsdale; 1882–1944	Succeeded by Lancelot Lowther
Honorary titles
Preceded by The Lord Muncaster	Lord Lieutenant of Cumberland; 1917–1944	Succeeded by Frescheville Hubert Ballantine-Dykes
