= Dolfin de Lowther =

Medieval English nobleman

- Arms of the Lowther family
- Monarchs: Henry I, King Stephen, Henry II

Personal details
- Born: 1120 England
- Children: Hamon de Lowther

Dolfin de Lowther (born c.1120) was an English nobleman descended from Danelaw Viking conquerors who in 1150, founded a settlement by the River Lowther that would eventually become the site of the still-standing Lowther Castle, which has since become a tourist attraction. The name Lowther is attributed to the Old Norse words of lauðr + á, meaning "foamy river".

== Marriage and issue ==
He married and had one son, Hamon de Lowther, who was recorded in a document from Durham dated 21 November 1202, containing information regarding the 'land of Hamon son of Dolfin'.
