= Andrea Brunsendorf =

German-born gardener, horticulturalist and landscaper

Andrea Brunsendorf is a gardener, horticulturalist and landscaper. She was born in Thuringia in Germany, and gained a degree in Ornamental Horticulture in Erfurt. She was an apprentice at the seedbreeder N. L. Chrestensen in Erfurt and then worked for Kakteen-Haage in the same town afterwards. She holds an MA in Conservation from the Institute of Archaeology, University College London. She has worked at a variety of international gardens including Kirstenbosch in South Africa, Kew Gardens where she gained a diploma in botanical horticulture; the ancient gardens of the Inner Temple, where she was its first female head gardener in 2007; and Longwood Gardens where she became the director of outdoor landscapes. Since June 2022 she is head gardener of Lowther Castle in Cumbria, where she looks after the gardens designed by Dan Pearson in 2007.
