= Juliana (dog) =

Dog awarded the Blue Cross medal

Juliana (died 1946) was a medal-winning Great Dane. She was awarded two Blue Cross medals, the first for extinguishing an incendiary bomb and the second for alerting her masters to a fire that had started in their shop. In September 2013 the second of these medals, along with a portrait of Juliana, sold at auction for £1,100. The discovery and sale of these items uncovered the story of Juliana's heroic acts.

== Honours ==
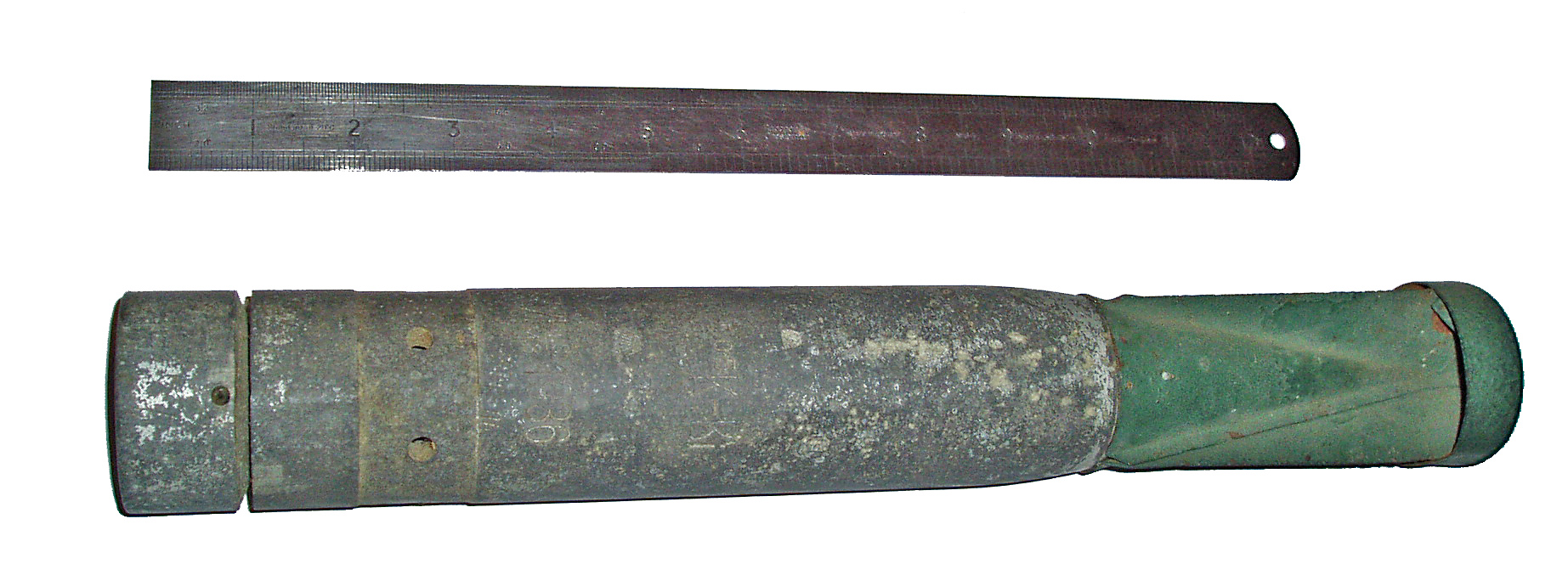
Juliana extinguished a German incendiary device similar to this one.

In April 1941, two years into World War II, incendiary bombs were being dropped across Britain during The Blitz. One such device is believed to have fallen through the roof of the house in which Juliana and her owner lived. The dog is reported to have stood over the bomb and urinated on it, extinguishing the fire and preventing it from spreading. She was awarded her first Blue Cross medal for her actions.

Juliana was celebrated as a hero for a second time when, in November 1944, she again helped to save the lives of her owners. After a fire had taken hold in their shoe shop, she alerted her master's family to the impending danger. For this she was awarded a second medal.

The second medal, along with a portrait of Juliana, was discovered during a house clearance in Bristol. The items were sold together at a Gloucestershire auction in September 2013, with the auctioneer describing Juliana as "a Great Dane with a great bladder". Initially expected to achieve £60, the sale reached £1,100 with the winning bid coming from an anonymous buyer.

== Death ==
Juliana died from poisoning in 1946 after a substance was posted through her owner's letterbox.
