= Harry Bensley =

Harry Bensley (1876 or 1877 – 21 May 1956) was an English rake and adventurer, best remembered as the subject of an extraordinary wager between John Pierpont Morgan and Hugh Cecil Lowther, 5th Earl of Lonsdale. How much of his story is based on fact is unclear.

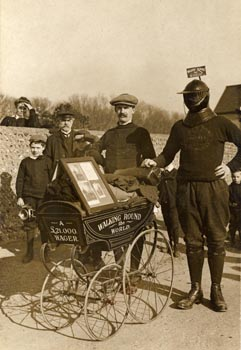
Bensley (in iron mask), 1908

Bensley was from Thetford in Norfolk, England. In 1904 he was sentenced to four years' penal servitude for bigamy and fraud: he had married a woman named Lily Chapman in 1903 even though he was already married to his first wife, Kate Green, whom he had married in 1898; he had also been defrauding people by posing as the son of a knight and claiming that he was due to inherit large estates in Norfolk. By 1907 he was a businessman and investor, working particularly in Imperial Russia and reputedly received an income of £5,000 a year.

== The wager ==
According to the original tale, one evening in 1907 at the National Sporting Club in London, Morgan and Lonsdale were arguing whether a man could walk around the world without being identified. Bensley, a notorious "playboy" and womaniser with a substantial private income, overheard the conversation and offered to test the proposition on their behalf. The outcome of the exchange was that Lonsdale bet Morgan the then-extravagant sum of £21,000 (worth approximately £2.6 million in 2021) that Bensley would complete a pedestrian circumnavigation incognito.

According to Ken McNaught, grandson of Bensley's son Jim Beasley, this is not entirely accurate. Bensley had gambled heavily with the two men, put up all his fortune in a game and lost. Now effectively destitute, he pleaded with the others to accept some way to forfeit. The two gentlemen came up with the unlikely wager.

Bensley had to satisfy 15 conditions, including:

- He was never to be identified;
- He was to walk around the world but first through 169 British cities and towns in a specific order; to prove his visit he would have to collect a signature from a local prominent resident. After that he would begin a tour of 18 countries and would have to visit them, also in a pre-specified order.
- Bensley was to finance himself, starting off with just GBP 1 and selling picture cards about himself;
- Only a change of underclothes was allowed as baggage;
- He was to complete the journey wearing an iron mask weighing 2 kg (4.5 lb) from a suit of armour;
- He was to push a perambulator (baby carriage) the entire journey;
- Another man was to accompany him to see that he fulfilled the conditions at all times, and
- On the journey he was to find a wife without her seeing his face (note that he was possibly married already).

Bensley set off on 1 January 1908 from Trafalgar Square, London, with pamphlets and postcards of himself which he intended to sell to finance his journey. He supposedly spent the next 6 and a half years on the road. Various tales tell about his journey; that he was arrested in Bexleyheath, Kent, for selling postcards without a licence and that the judge only fined him when he explained the conditions of the bet. It was also said that he sold a postcard to Edward VII and that Edward asked for Bensley's autograph, which Bensley refused as signing his name would have revealed his identity. (Another account of this encounter has Edward refusing to sign his autograph for Bensley.)

He supposedly received 200 marriage offers but accepted none of them. An unnamed newspaper was told to have promised £1,000 reward to someone who would reveal his identity.

=== Outcome ===
There is some dispute about to what extent Bensley actually complied with the terms of the wager. There is no documentary evidence that Bensley travelled far outside the British Isles but reports claimed that he got as far as China and Japan.

According to the original tale, on 14 August 1914, Bensley found himself in Genoa, Italy, claiming to have completed 30,000 miles of the journey and having only seven countries remaining on his itinerary. That month, World War I had begun and Bensley abandoned his journey, returning to fight for his country. One version of the tale claims that Morgan contacted him, called the bet off because of the war and gave him £4,000 for consolation, which Bensley gave to charity. However, this version cannot be true as J.P. Morgan died in March 1913. Others claim that Bensley himself decided to quit and fulfil his duty to enlist.

In 2018, a book was published, entitled Iron Mask: The Story of Harry Bensley's "Walking Round the World" Hoax, which claimed that the entire stunt had been a hoax.

Bensley served in the British Army in the first year of the War, was severely wounded and eventually invalided out of the army in 1915. Bensley lost his fortune in the Bolshevik Revolution when his investments in Russia became worthless and he was left destitute.

== Later years ==
After the war Bensley moved to live in Wivenhoe, Essex, with his wife Kate, to whom he may have been married as early as 1898. He worked in low-status jobs like cinema doorman, a YMCA warden and was twice elected local councillor for the Labour Party. According to one report, during the Second World War Bensley was a bomb checker at an ammunition factory.

Harry Bensley died in a bed-sitting room in Brighton, England on 21 May 1956.
