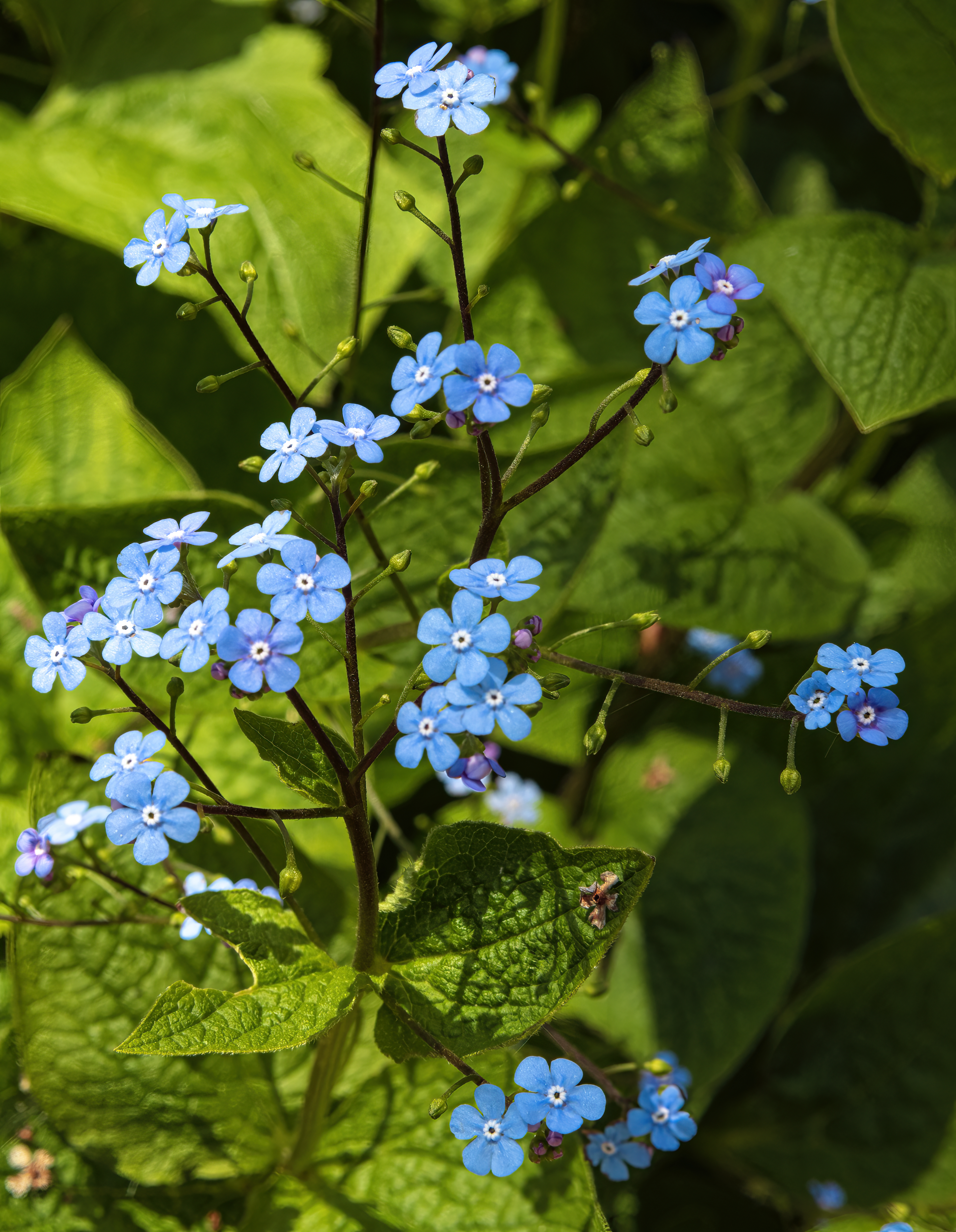
- inflorescence

Scientific classification
- Kingdom: Plantae
- Clade: Embryophytes
- Clade: Tracheophytes
- Clade: Spermatophytes
- Clade: Angiosperms
- Clade: Eudicots
- Clade: Asterids
- Order: Boraginales
- Family: Boraginaceae
- Genus: Brunnera
- Species: B. macrophylla

Binomial name
- Brunnera macrophylla (J. F. Adams) I. M. Johnst.

= Brunnera macrophylla =

Species of plant

Brunnera macrophylla, the Siberian bugloss, great forget-me-not, largeleaf brunnera or heartleaf, is a species of flowering plant in the family Boraginaceae, native to the Caucasus. It is a hardy, rhizomatous, herbaceous perennial, that can reach from 12 to 18 inches (30 to 45 cm) in height, and carries basal, simple cordate leaves on slender stems. Sprays of small blue flowers, similar to those seen in the related forget-me-nots, are borne from mid-Spring, and bloom for eight to ten weeks.

The plant is valued as groundcover in shady areas, and has clumps of large heart-shaped leaves of about six inches (15 cm); these usually have white or cream markings, and are present all season. Plants are happy in any shady area that stays relatively moist. It often self-seeds, appearing around the garden in other places. Clumps may be easily divided in early fall.

Brunnera macrophylla may be reflective of the ancient flora of forests around the Black Sea, based on chromosomal genetic evidence.

The Latin specific epithet macrophylla means "larger-leaved".

The variegated cultivars 'Hadspen Cream' and 'Jack Frost' have gained the Royal Horticultural Society's Award of Garden Merit.
