= F. Russell Roberts =

English soldier and big game hunter

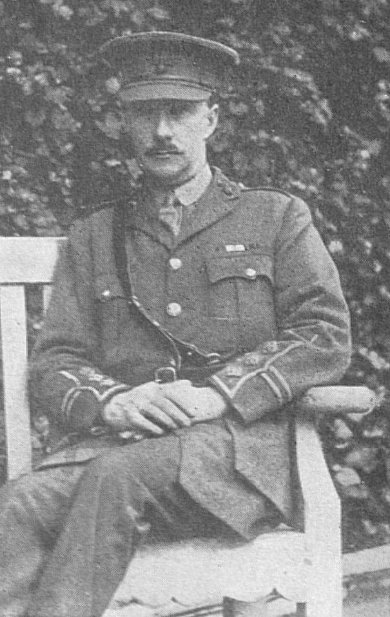
- Born: Frederick Villeneuve Russell Roberts; 1 January 1873; Notting Hill
- Died: 1956 (aged 83); Hampshire
- Occupation: Wildlife photographer
- Spouse: Ellen Webber (m. 1909)

Captain Frederick Villeneuve Russell Roberts (1 January 1873 – 1956) was an English soldier, big game hunter and wildlife photographer who served as secretary of the animal welfare organization Our Dumb Friends' League.

== Life ==
Roberts was born on 1 January 1873 and attended Rugby School. He was the second son of Edward Russell Roberts. He served as Captain of 10th Royal Fusiliers during World War I. Roberts married Ellen Webber in 1909. Their son was born in 1913.

In January 1916 he received severe wounds in the German trenches to his legs and lungs. He is described as having crawled in pain a mile and half to an Ambulance Field Hospital. In February 1916, Roberts sustained wounds from an exploding bomb. He was saved by Private Mauffinades who carried him back to the British trenches. His injuries were so severe that he lost a leg. In 1917, Roberts was Adjutant of the St. Dunstan's Hostel for Soldiers and Sailors Blinded in the War.

Roberts was appointed secretary of Our Dumb Friends' League on the on 4 January 1922 for a probation period on a salary of £500 a year. His position was made permanent in April 1923 and his annual salary was raised to £600. Roberts resided in Rickmansworth.

He was an ardent fisherman and trained his dog to retrieve fish that he had caught.

== Big game photography ==
Roberts was a big game hunter and photographer who wrote articles for Country Life and Wild Life. He attended a big-game shooting expedition at the French Senegambia in January 1910. He was described as one of the pioneers of big game photography.

== Selected publications ==
- "Sport on the Senegambian Rivers". Country Life. 33 (841): 229–231. 1913.
- "The Black Rhinoceros" (PDF). Wild Life. 5 (3): 59–65. 1914.
