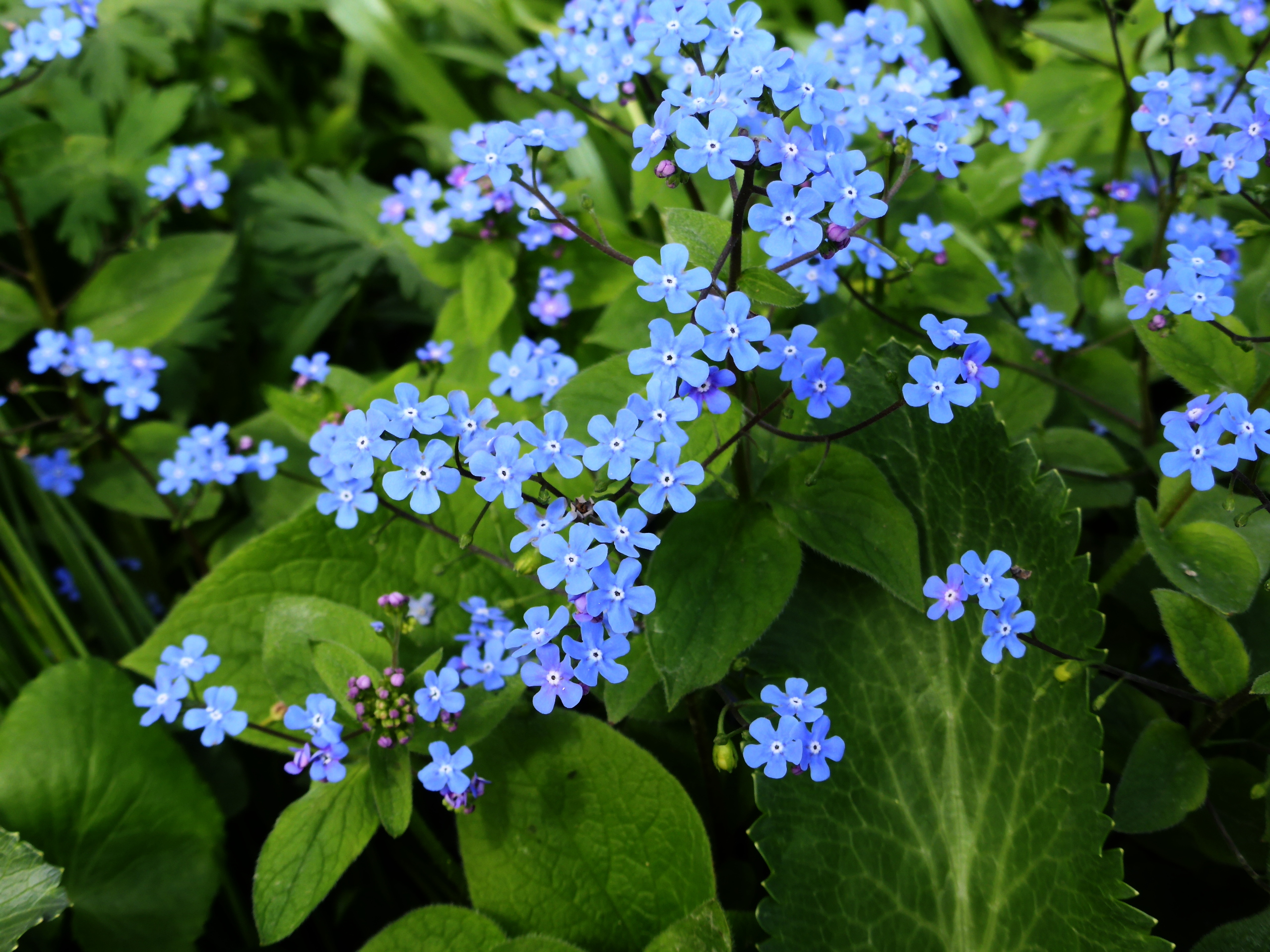
- Brunnera macrophylla (Siberian bugloss) Botanischer Garten Augsburg

Scientific classification
- Kingdom: Plantae
- Clade: Embryophytes
- Clade: Tracheophytes
- Clade: Spermatophytes
- Clade: Angiosperms
- Clade: Eudicots
- Clade: Asterids
- Order: Boraginales
- Family: Boraginaceae
- Subfamily: Boraginoideae
- Genus: Brunnera; Steven

= Brunnera =

Genus of flowering plants in the borage family

Brunnera is a genus of flowering plants in the family Boraginaceae. They are rhizomatous perennials, native to the woodlands of Eastern Europe and North West Asia. They have hairy leaves and sprays of blue flowers in spring. Numerous cultivars are available, which are valued as groundcover in dappled shade. Some possess variegated foliage. The best known species is B. macrophylla, known as Siberian bugloss.

The genus name honors the Swiss botanist Samuel Brunner. The common name "bugloss", meaning ox tongue, originates from Greek and probably refers to the texture and shape of the leaves.

== Species ==
Accepted species:

Image	Scientific name	Distribution
	Brunnera macrophylla (Adams) I.M.Johnst.	North Caucasus, Transcaucasus, Turkey
	Brunnera orientalis (Schenk) I.M.Johnst.	Iran, Iraq, Lebanon-Syria, Palestine, Turkey
	Brunnera sibirica Steven	SW. & S. Central Siberia
