= Blue Cross (animal charity) =

British animal welfare charity

- Founded: 1897; 129 years ago
- Purpose: Animal veterinary treatment, rehoming and owner support
- Location: Burford, Oxfordshire, England
- Region served: United Kingdom
- Revenue: £36.05 million (2020)
- Employees: 779 (2020)
- Volunteers: 4,327 (2018)
- Website: www.bluecross.org.uk

Blue Cross is a registered animal welfare charity in the United Kingdom, founded in 1897. The charity provides veterinary care, offers expert behavioural help, and finds homes for pets in need. Their pet bereavement service supports those who are struggling to cope with the loss of a much-loved pet.

The charity works closely with a number of other organisations to help animal welfare and responsible pet ownership.

== History ==
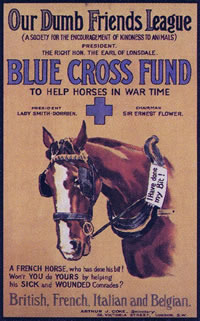
1916 poster promoting the Blue Cross Fund

The organisation was founded on 10 May 1897 in London as Our Dumb Friends' League (ODFL) by a small group of men and women to care for working horses on the streets of the British capital. The objective of the league was to encourage kindness to animals. The League's headquarters were located at 164 Buckingham Palace Road, London.

Janet Stuart-Dennison (Note: Janet Stuart-Dennison was also known as Janet Charlotte Bennett Mathew and Mrs J. C. Mathew.) claimed to be the sole founder of the League. A granolithic trough from the Metropolitan Drinking Fountain and Cattle Trough Association with the words "Sole Founder and Originator of Our Dumb Friends' League" was erected in her memory on Ditton Road, Surbiton. Stuart-Dennison's claim of being the sole founder has been disputed by the League. In 1935, the deputy secretary commented that "according to our minute book she was the original president, but Mr. Arthur J. Coke, the first secretary, was the real founder". Rev. Lionel Smithett Lewis has also been cited as a founder. Rev. Lewis stated that in its early days the League opposed the caging of birds and captive wild animals at the London Zoo.

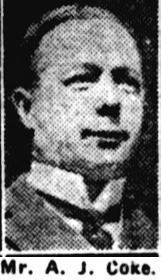
Arthur J. Coke, first secretary of the League

The 1897 Committee of the League consisted of president Janet Stuart-Dennison, secretary Arthur J. Coke, Baron de Bush, George Samuel Measom, Lady William Lennox, R. Sommerville Wood, Mrs Matthews Coke, Lady Ellis, Miss Telfer, Rev. Lewis, W. H. Chilcott and others. In 1898, the League held their annual meeting at Grosvenor Hall, Buckingham Palace Road. Rev. Lewis presided with speakers Lady William Lennox, George Candy, R. Somerville Wood and Dr. Washington Sullivan. Sommerville Wood argued that the League was opposed to vivisection and that any lover of animals should be an ardent anti-vivisectionist.

The League opened its first animal hospital, in Victoria, London, on 15 May 1906. It also operated other committees including the Animals' Hospital Fund whose president was the Duchess of Teck and Horse Ambulance Fund whose President was the Duke of Portland.

In 1912, the League launched the Blue Cross Fund to care for horses during the Balkan War. (Note: The Blue Cross Fund was also known as the Blue Cross Society.) On the outbreak of the First World War in 1914, it was quickly reopened again. By the armistice in 1918, the Blue Cross Fund had raised nearly £170,000 – the equivalent of almost £6.5 million today – to care for the animals of conflict. Over 50,000 horses were treated in Blue Cross hospitals in France, and the charity had sent vital veterinary supplies to 3,500 units of the British Army. The president of the Blue Cross Fund was Olive Smith-Dorrien. Chairmen of the Blue Cross Fund included Charles Forward in 1914 and Sir Ernest Flower from 1915 to 1919.

In 1914, the President of Our Dumb Friends' League was Lord Lonsdale and the chairman was Roy Horniman. There were 86 members on the League's Grand Council. Notable members of the League were Annie Bradshaw and Louis Wain. F. Russell Roberts was appointed secretary of the League in 1922. The secretary in 1935 was Evan Keith Robinson.

In 1938, the League condemned blood sports such as fox hunting. In response the British Field Sports Society noted that patrons and vice-presidents of the League were well known hunting people, including at least one Master of Hounds. Sixteen patrons and vice-presidents resigned from the League's opposition to blood sports. Among those who resigned were Earl and Countess Fitzwilliam, Earl of Mar and Kellie, Earl of Kintore, Duke of Portland, Countess of Coventry, Marchioness of Exeter and the Duke of Westminster. Secretary Evan Keith Robinson commented that "we are a society for the protection of animals and therefore we cannot possibly, at the same time, be in favour of causing suffering to any animal". In October 1938, an article in the Truth newspaper had alleged that money from funds had not been used for the League's campaign to rescue old war horses from Belgium and suggested that the conduct of Robinson as secretary justified the attention of the Public Prosecutor. In 1941, Robinson sued Henry Newnham editor of Truth for libel and was awarded £2000 in damages in High Court.

Donations to the Blue Cross Fund enabled the charity to care for more than 350,000 animals during the Second World War, many of whom were wounded during the Blitz. The name of the appeal fund became more widely known than the official charity title and the league officially changed its name to "The Blue Cross" in 1950. In 2011 the charity dropped "The" from its name and is now simply known as "Blue Cross."

Sally de la Bedoyere became the charity's CEO in November 2014. In June 2020, Chris Burghes joined Blue Cross as CEO.

== Operations ==
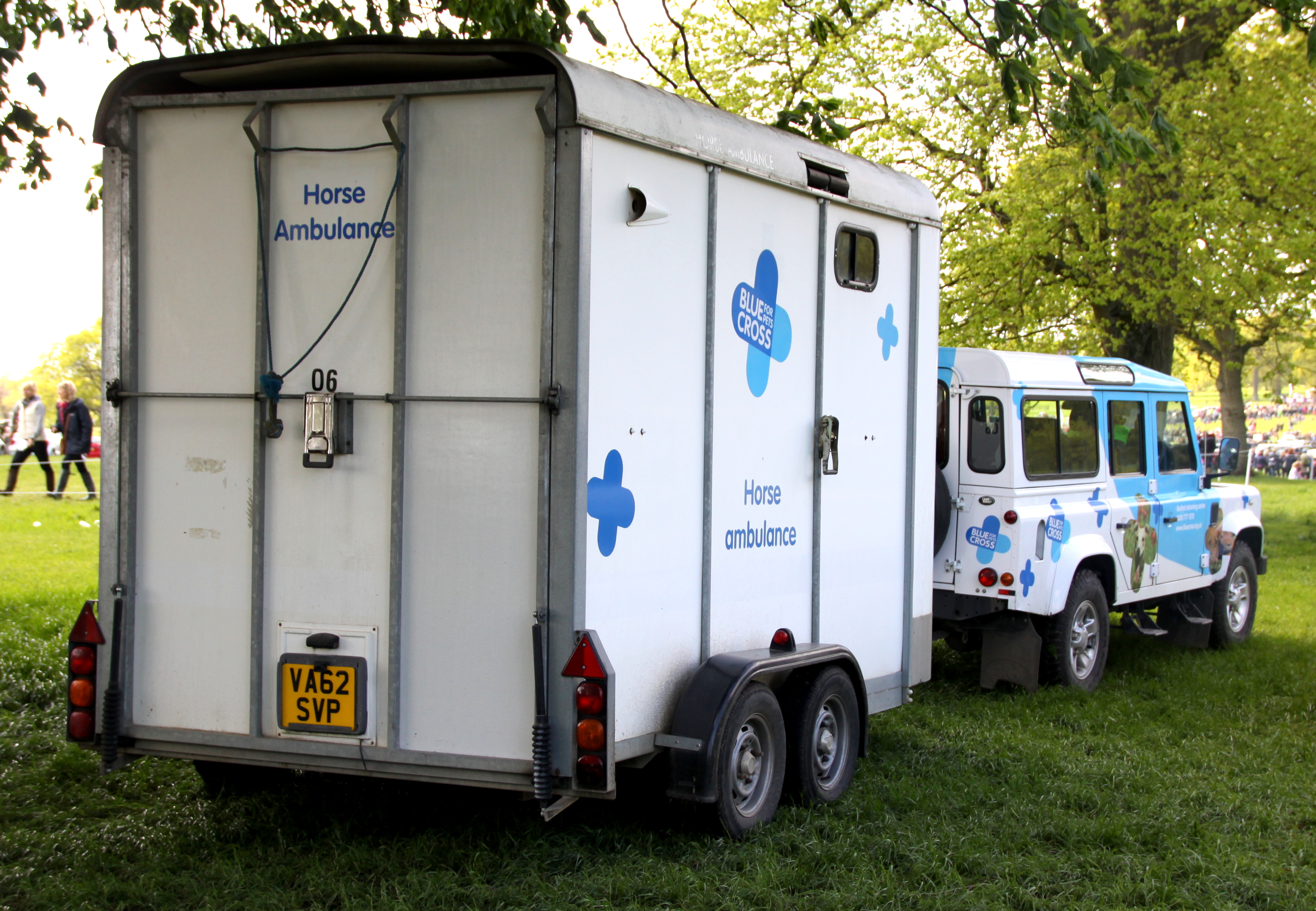
Blue Cross horse ambulance at Badminton 2015

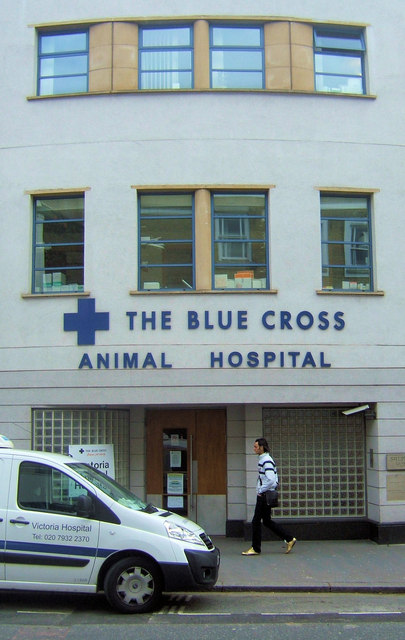
Blue Cross Animal Hospital, Hugh Street, near Victoria Station, Pimlico, London, United Kingdom

Blue Cross operates a number of services throughout the United Kingdom. Its major services are: rehoming unwanted animals, providing veterinary services to pet owners who cannot afford the private fees charged by private veterinary surgeons, promoting animal welfare through education, and operating the Pet Bereavement Support Service, a free and confidential support line for those who have lost a pet. They also operate a horse ambulance service, including at large equestrian events.

Blue Cross operates four animal hospitals, three of which are in London, at Victoria, Merton and Hammersmith, and a fourth in Grimsby, Lincolnshire,. In 2014 it opened a pet care clinic in Derby, and has since opened a further four. Blue Cross carried out over 97,000 treatments, operations and diagnostic investigations in 2010.

Blue Cross is also heavily involved in animal adoption, arranging adoption for companion animals such as cats, dogs, rabbits and small rodents, as well as larger species such as horses. In 2015, the charity's rehoming team helped 9,160 animals and its veterinary team helped 29,549 animals. The organisation also works to improve the lives of animals through promotion to pet owners and work in animal behaviour therapy. Every pet owner that rehomes a pet through the charity can benefit from free behaviour advice for the pet's lifetime. The Pet Bereavement Support Service is a free and confidential telephone and email helpline and is available 365 days a year to help people who are struggling to cope with the loss of a pet.

On 26 January 2010, Blue Cross announced the proposed closure of the two animal adoption centres (Felixstowe and Northiam, East Sussex), both of which had been in existence for over 50 years. Final decisions on both sites were announced on 4 May 2010. After an extensive publicity campaign by locals, it was announced that plans to close the Felixstowe centre had been dropped. The Felixstowe centre was relocated to a brand new purpose-built site near Ipswich, Suffolk, in 2016 and can now care for double the number of pets as the previous site was able to care for. Blue Cross also opened a new animal adoption centre in Newport, South Wales, in 2016.

== Partnerships ==
The Irish Blue Cross is a related party of Blue Cross.

The Blue Cross is an Advisory Member of the Animal Behaviour & Training Council (ABTC).

== Awards ==
Medals have been awarded by Blue Cross to animals and people who have demonstrated bravery or heroism. While the first medals were awarded to people who helped to rescue animals, medals were awarded in 1918 to honour a number of horses which had served in the First World War. Medals were then given out between 1940 and 1951 to a number of dogs, including Juliana who reportedly extinguished an incendiary bomb by urinating on it. In 2006 Jake, a police explosives dog, was given the honour after helping to clear out the London Underground after the 7 July 2005 London bombings. In 2017, Staffordshire bull terrier Romeo received the Blue Cross Medal for being a therapy dog for stroke victims and dementia sufferers and donating blood.

== Presidents ==
1897–1914	Janet Stuart-Dennison
1914–1930	Lord Lonsdale
1931–1934	Basil Bourchier
1934–1937	Charles Barrowdale Carryer
1941–1942	Lady Portsea
1943–1951	Countess Mountbatten
1995–2005	Alastair Porter
2006–2011	Tom Vyner
