= Whitehaven Castle =

Building in Cumbria, England

Coordinates: 54.5454°N 3.5831°W

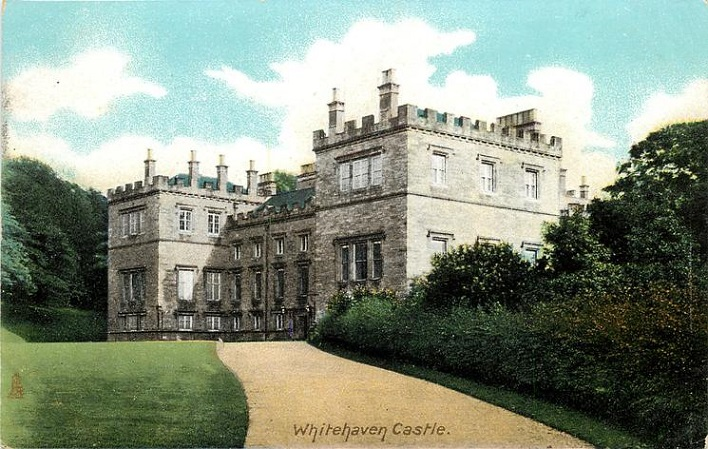
Whitehaven Castle

Whitehaven Castle is a historic building in Whitehaven, Cumbria. It is a Grade II listed building.

== History ==
The building was constructed for Sir John Lowther as his private residence; it was originally known as Flatt Hall and was completed in 1769. In 1924, the Earl of Lonsdale sold Whitehaven Castle to Herbert Wilson Walker, a local industrialist, who then donated the building to the people of West Cumberland, along with £20,000 to convert it into a new hospital. Later, a second new hospital, the West Cumberland Hospital was opened in 1964 by the Queen Mother, and Whitehaven Castle then became a facility for the elderly and has since been converted into apartments.
