= HKU station =

MTR station on Hong Kong Island

HKU 香港大學
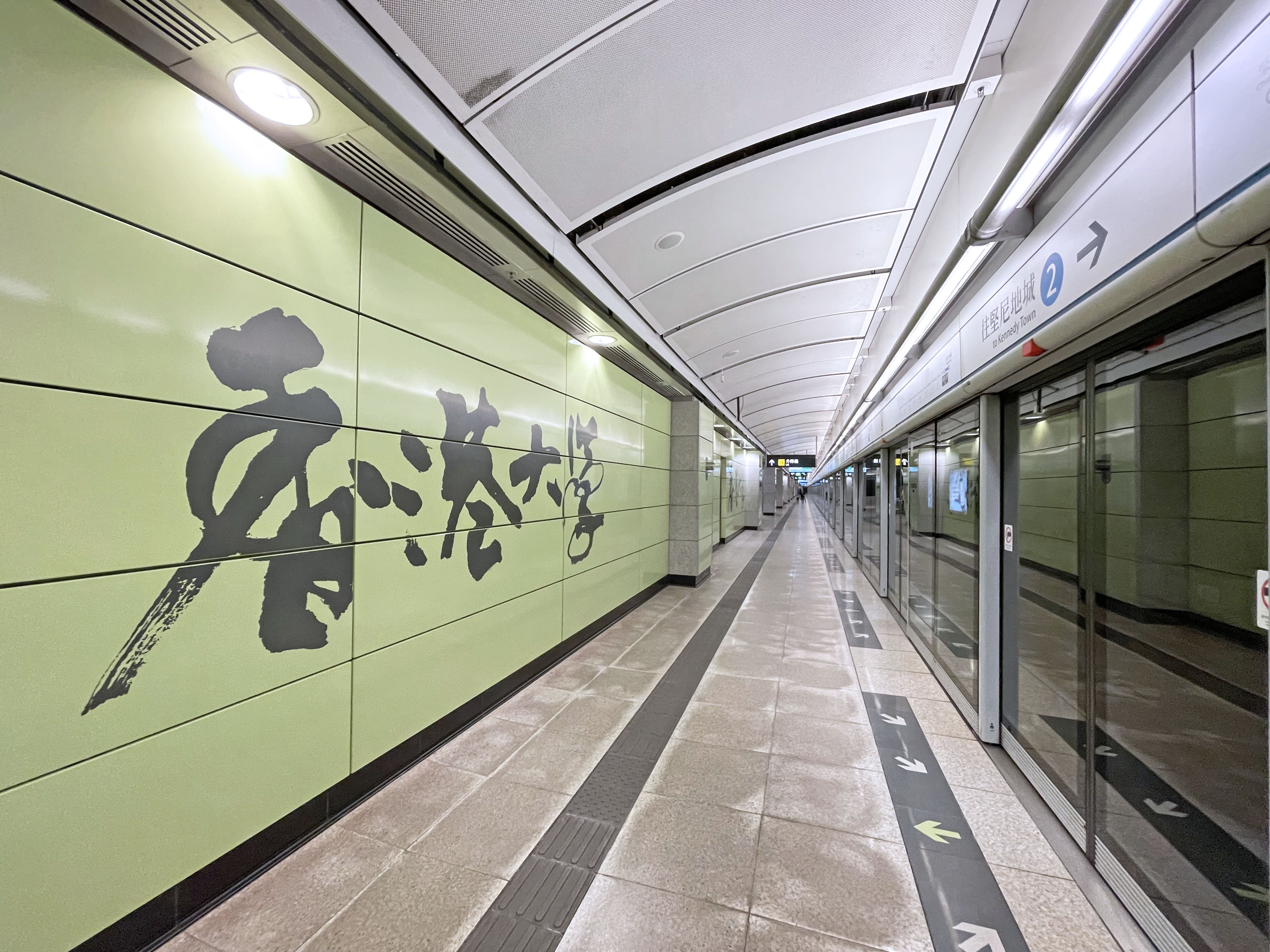
- Platform 1 (foreground), photographed in 2022

Chinese name
- Traditional Chinese: 香港大學
- Simplified Chinese: 香港大学
- Cantonese Yale: Hēunggóng Daaihhohk
Transcriptions
Standard Mandarin
- Hanyu Pinyin: Xiānggǎng Dàxué
Yue: Cantonese
- Yale Romanization: Hēunggóng Daaihhohk
- Jyutping: hoeng1 gong2 daai6 hok6

General information
- Location: The University of Hong Kong, Pok Fu Lam Road, Bonham Road, Lung Fu Shan, Shek Tong Tsui, Central and Western District, Hong Kong
- Coordinates: 22°17′03″N 114°08′08″E
- System: MTR rapid transit station
- Owner: MTR Corporation
- Operator: MTR Corporation
- Lines: Island line; South Island (West) (proposed)
- Platforms: 2 (1 island platform)
- Tracks: 2
- Connections: Bus, minibus

Construction
- Structure type: Underground
- Depth: 70 m (230 ft)
- Platform levels: 1
- Accessible: Yes
- Architect: Aedas and Wong & Ouyang

Other information
- Station code: HKU

History
- Opened: 28 December 2014; 11 years ago
- Former names: Shek Tong Tsui

Services
Preceding station	MTR	Following station
Kennedy Town Terminus	Island line	Sai Ying Pun towards Chai Wan
Planned
Terminus	South Island line (West)	Queen Mary Hospital towards Wong Chuk Hang
Track layout
Location
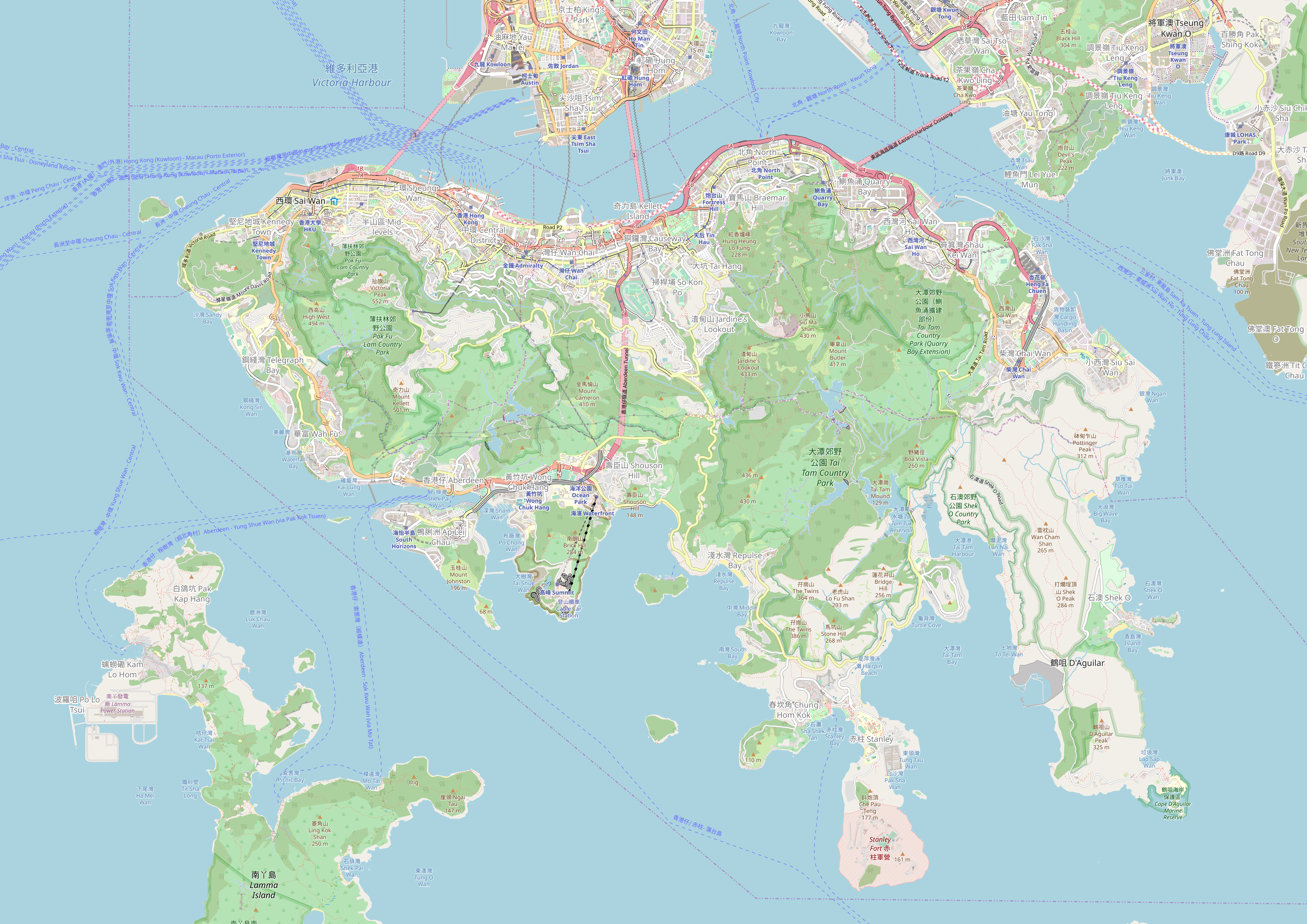
- Location within MTR Location within Hong Kong Island

HKU (Chinese: 香港大學) is a station on the Hong Kong MTR Island line located in the Shek Tong Tsui neighbourhood of Western, Hong Kong. The station is named after the adjacent University of Hong Kong. Its livery is mint green.

Part of the West Island line, a westward extension to the existing Island line, HKU station opened on 28 December 2014 along with Kennedy Town station.

As of its opening, HKU station was the largest and deepest cavern station in the MTR network, at 250 metres long and 22 metres wide,70 m (230 ft) below ground.

== History ==
Before the 1980s, an MTR station by the name of Whitty (屈地) was planned to be built underground at Des Voeux Road West, near Ka On Street, Whitty Street and Hill Road. Lots at Chong Yip Centre and Pacific Plaza were reserved for future station exits and concourse. This was part of a planned extension of the Island line that was never built, but which was replaced by the West Island line project, of which HKU station forms a part.

The MTR Corporation let out a tender for the construction of the Sai Ying Pun and HKU stations and 2.2 km (1.4 mi) of tunnel. In 2009, the design and architecture was awarded to Aedas in joint venture with AECOM. The construction work was awarded to Gammon Construction (half owned by Balfour Beatty) for HK$4.7 billion. Construction commenced in 2010 and was completed in 2014. HKU station opened on 28 December 2014.

== Naming ==
There were disputes among locals and district councillors over the station's name. Some suggested to restore the previous official name "Belcher" (寶翠, [pǒutsʰɵ̄y], bou2 ceoi3) after The Belcher's, a housing development in the area, as well as Belcher Street and Belcher Bay. Some believed that the MTR Corporation's decision to change the name to "University" was not well consulted within the community, while others worried that it might cause confusion with another existing University station on the East Rail line, near the campus of the Chinese University of Hong Kong. Some also suggested "Shek Tong Tsui", after the area the station would serve.

In August 2009, MTR named the station "Hong Kong University". The latest revision changed the English name to "HKU", the abbreviation of The University of Hong Kong nearby.

== Station layout ==
G	Ground level	Exits/Entrances
C	Concourse	Customer Service
P Platforms	Platform 1	Island line towards Chai Wan (Sai Ying Pun) →
P Platforms	Island platform, doors will open on the right
P Platforms	Platform 2	← Island line towards Kennedy Town (Terminus)

The station is located under Pok Fu Lam Road. It has two tracks and one centre island platform. In addition, the MTR has built elevators to link HKU station to the University of Hong Kong. The HKU station is located at a depth of 70 metres (230 ft), making it the deepest station in the MTR system upon its opening.

HKU station features designated refuge areas, to which passengers can be evacuated in case of emergency. Refuge areas are pressurised and equipped with fire systems including sprinklers and fire curtains, and independent power supply units. HKU station is the first station in the MTR network to apply such shelter design and the use of lifts to reach safety.

== Exits ==
HKU station has six exits. As exits A1, A2 and C1 are situated deep underneath Mid-Levels, only express lifts are used to transport passengers. This makes HKU station the first station in the MTR system to feature lift-only exits.

Exits A1 and A2 are served by a total of eight lifts with a maximum load of 1,800 kg per lift. Exit C1 is served by four lifts with a capacity of 2,100 kg each.

- A1: Pok Fu Lam Road (near Haking Wong Building), St. Paul's College, St. Stephen's Church College
- A2: The University of Hong Kong Main Campus, Chow Yei Ching Building, Haking Wong Building
- B1: Whitty Street, Chong Yip Shopping Centre, Shek Tong Tsui Municipal Services Building
- B2: Hill Road, Hong Kong Plaza, JEN Hong Kong by Shangri-La
- C1: The Belcher's, Pok Fu Lam Road, The University of Hong Kong Centennial Campus
- C2: Belcher's Street, Harbour One, The Westwood, Kennedy Town Swimming Pool
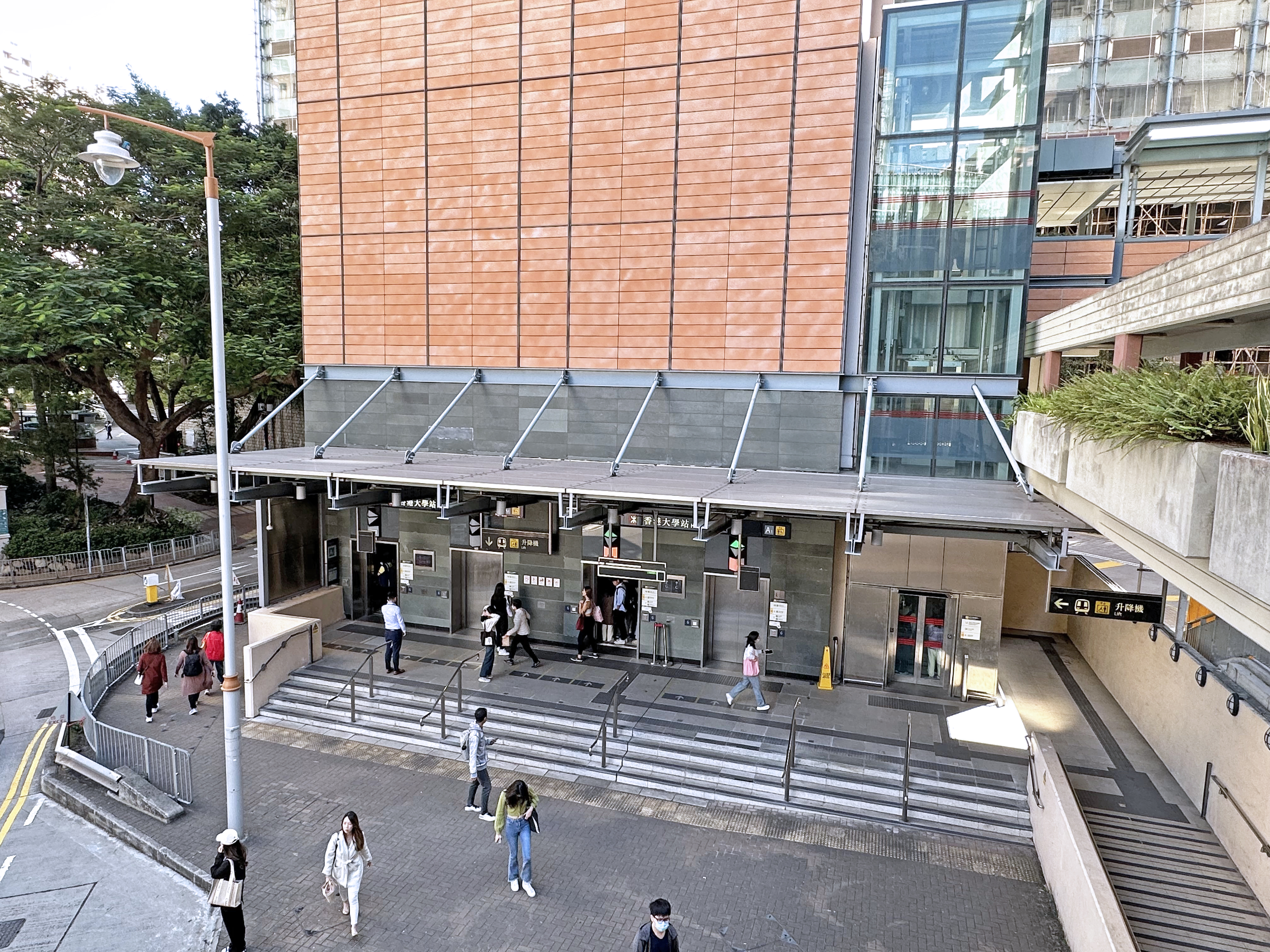
Entrance & Exit A1

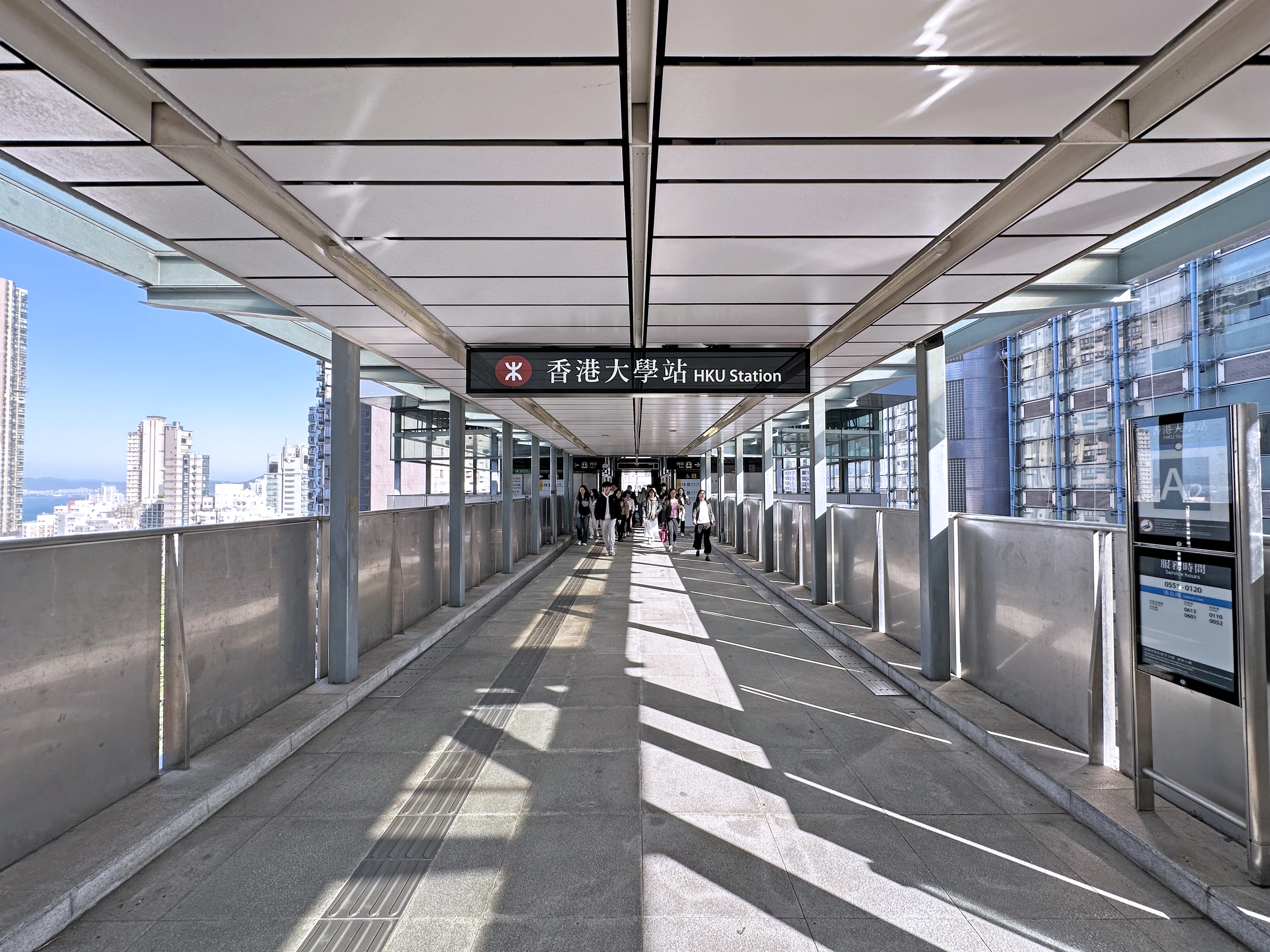
Entrance & Exit A2

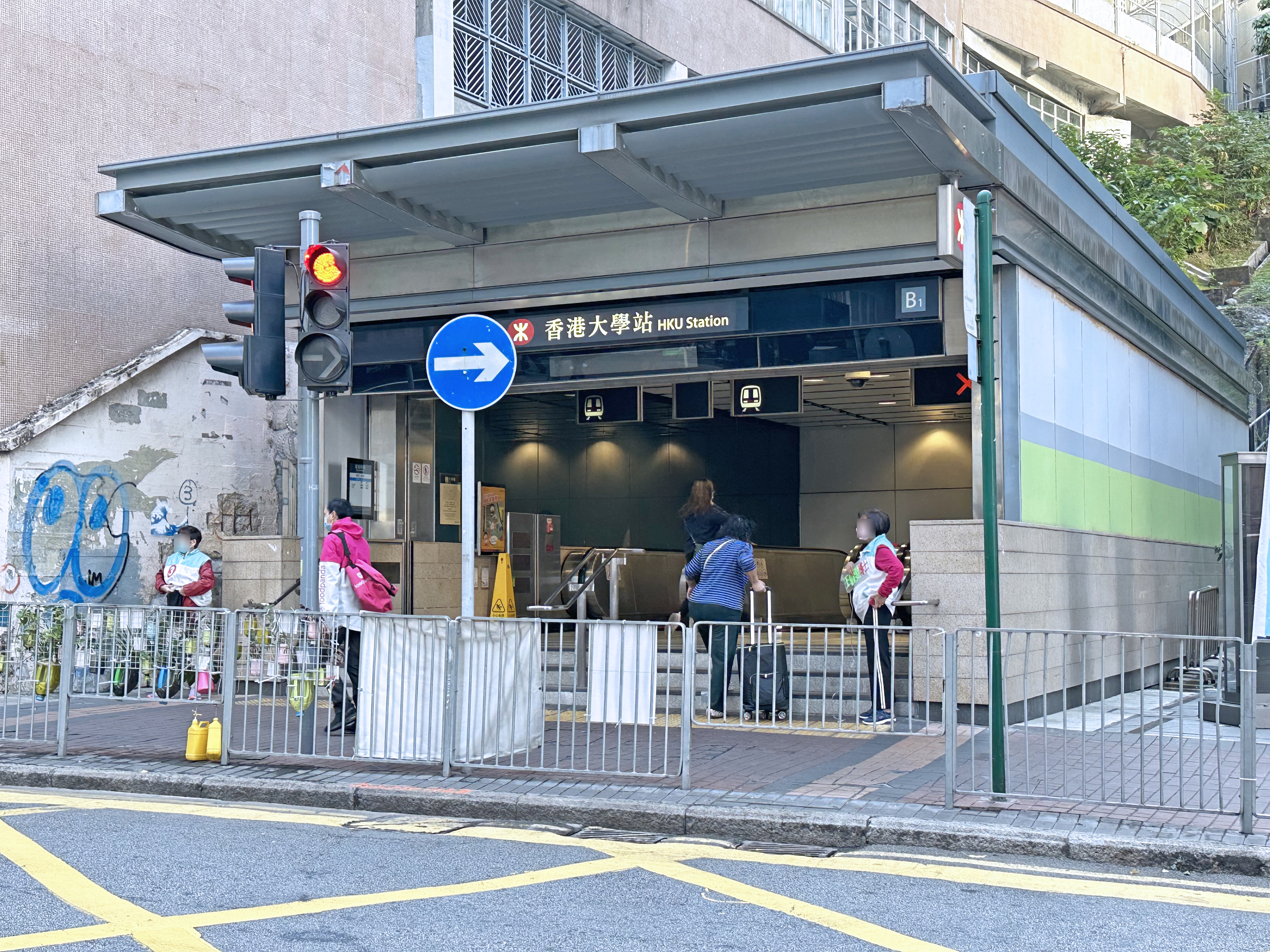
Entrance & Exit B1

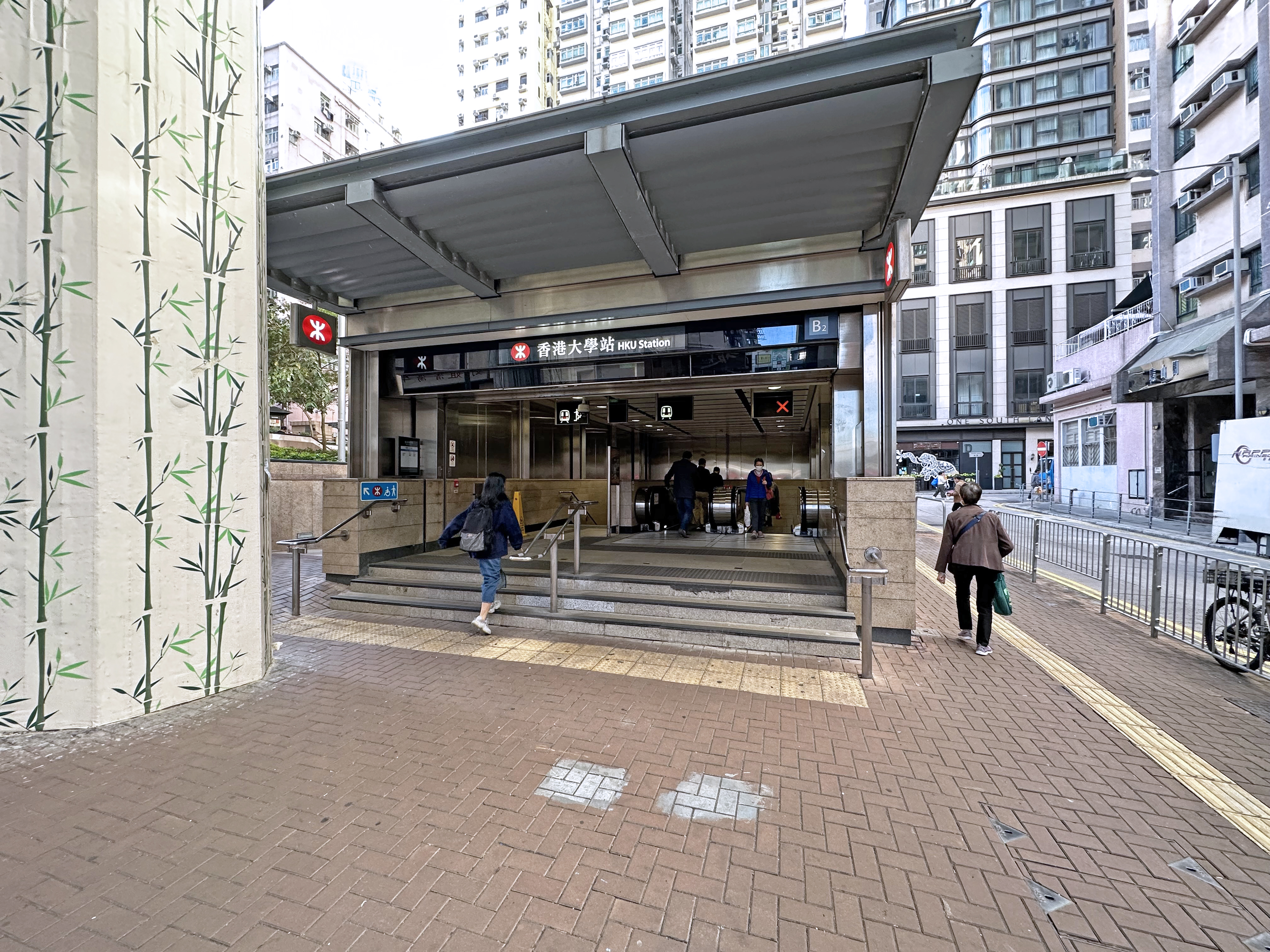
Entrance & Exit B2

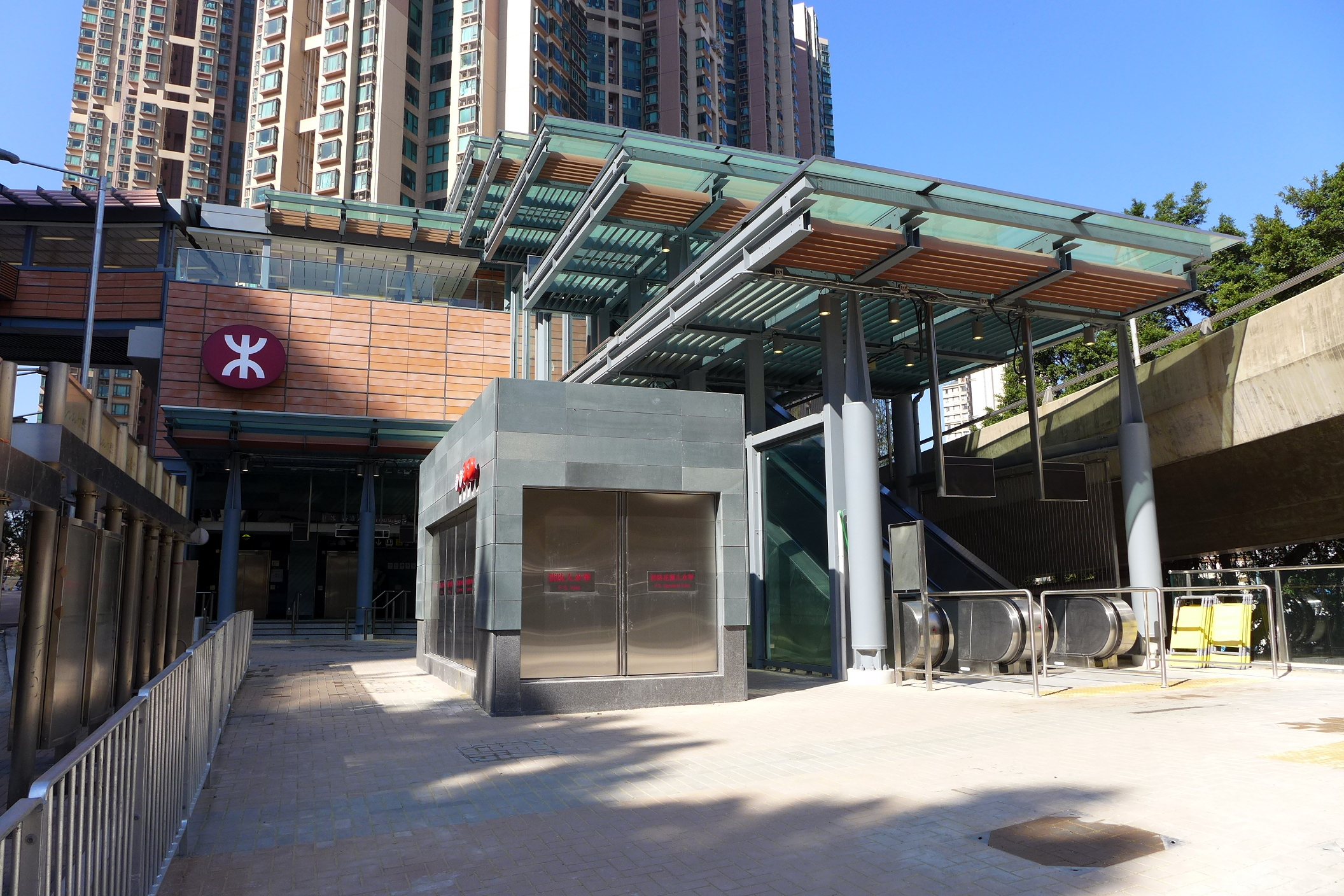
Entrance & Exit C1

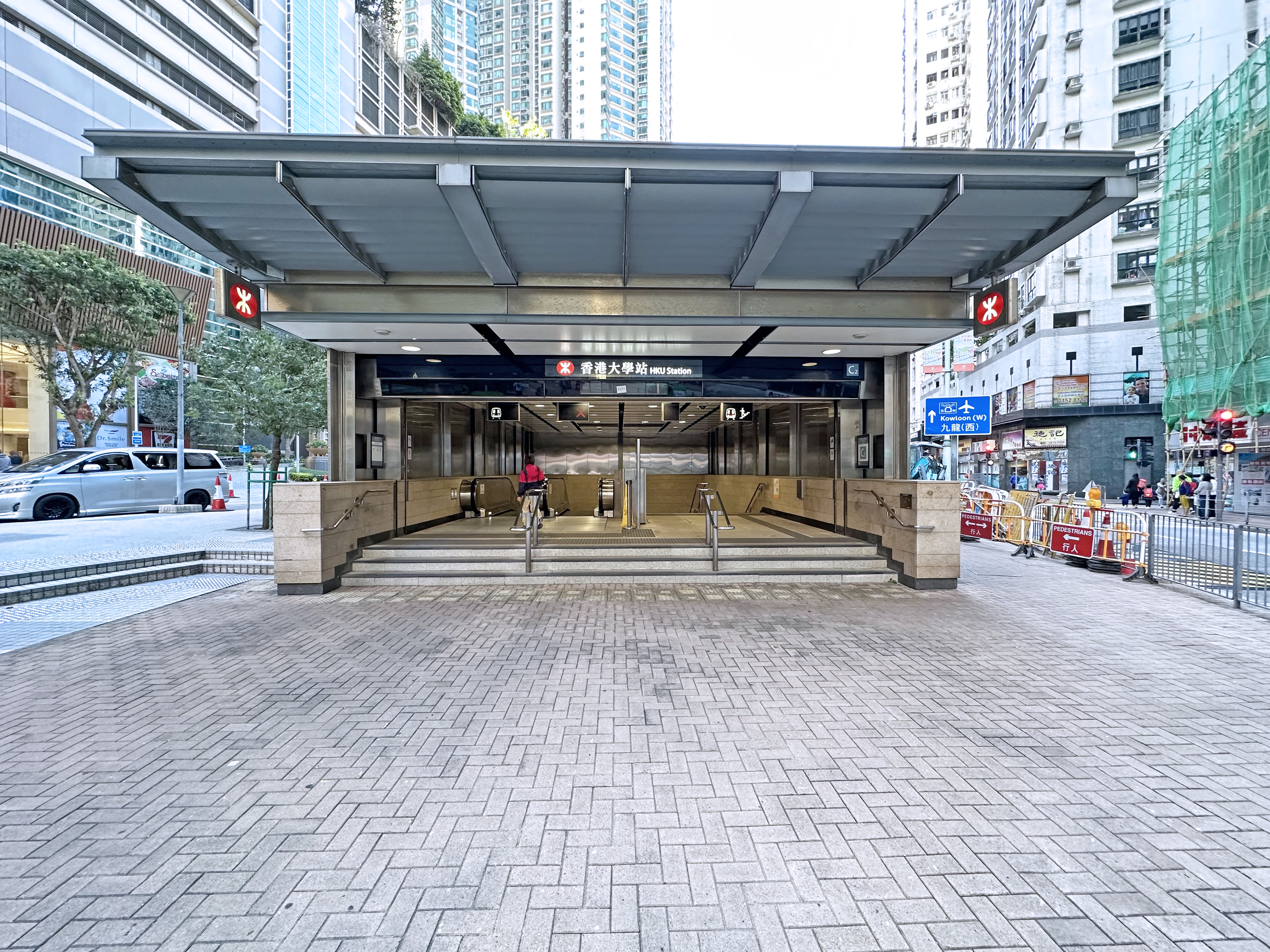
Entrance & Exit C2

== Operational challenges ==
=== Elevator congestion ===
During peak hours, the lifts are unable to handle the sheer volume of passengers. As the two exits connected to The University of Hong Kong main campus, long queues develop at exits A1 and A2 during peak hours due to large passenger flow from the student population. In response to the significant congestion issue, the Information Technology Services of the University of Hong Kong has introduced the "MTR Queuing Condition" feature on the HKU App. It delivers real-time queuing status between the University Street and MTR HKU Station Exit A2. This has made real-time queuing status accessible to users, allowing them to plan their commutes.

=== 2019-2020 Hong Kong Protests ===
In the series of local demonstrations from 2019 to 2020, facilities of more than 20 MTR stations were vandalised, including the HKU Station. The lifts serving Exit C1 were propped open and damaged. Protesters also installed roadblocks at the campus entrances at Exits A1, A2 and C1 to prevent police from entering.

The MTR Corporation strongly condemned vandalism. On November 13, it announced that the HKU Station would close at 8pm.

== Future ==
HKU station is proposed to be an interchange station for the Island line and the South Island line (West). The platforms of the South Island line (West) will be built under those of the Island line.

== Gallery ==
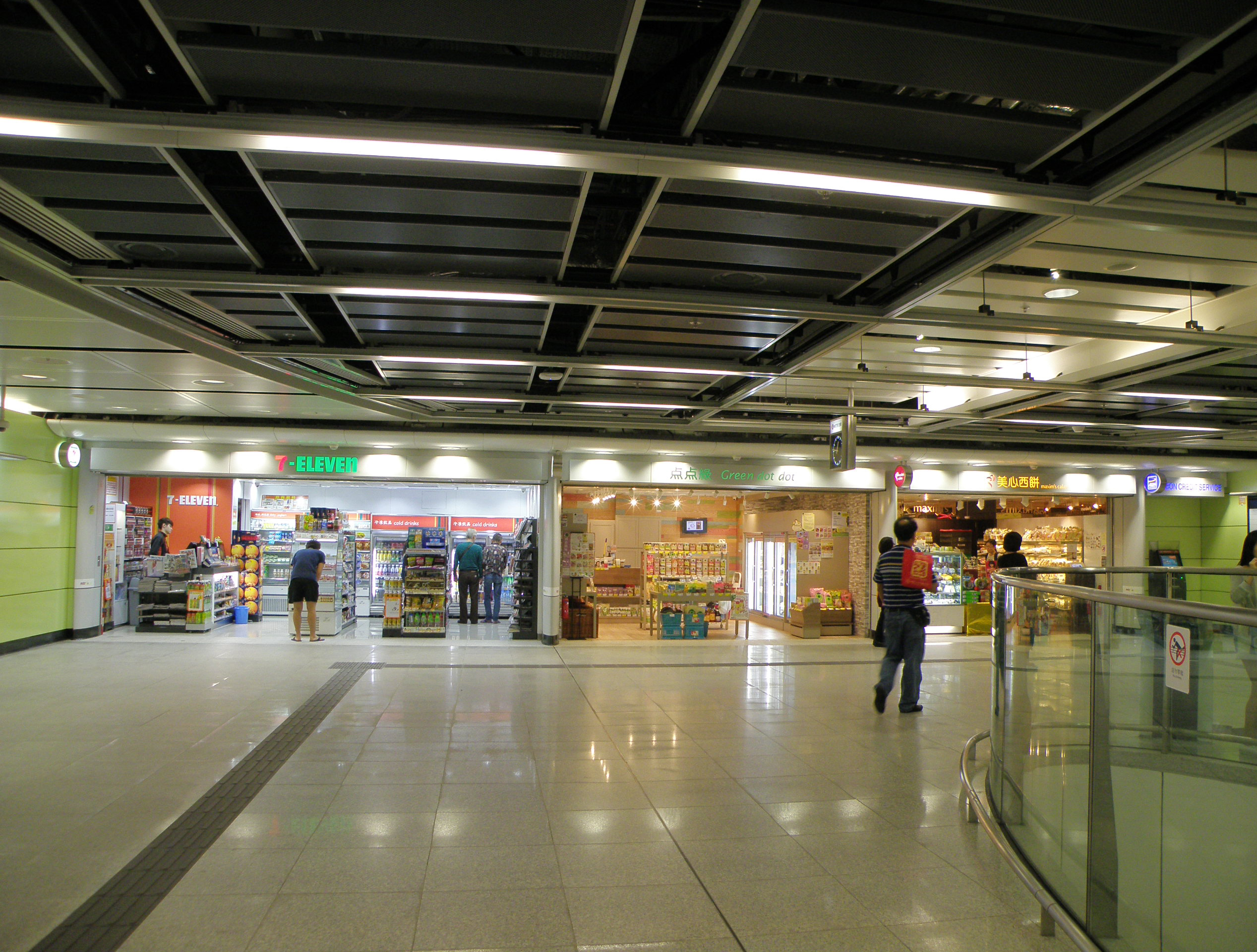
Shops (West Concourse)

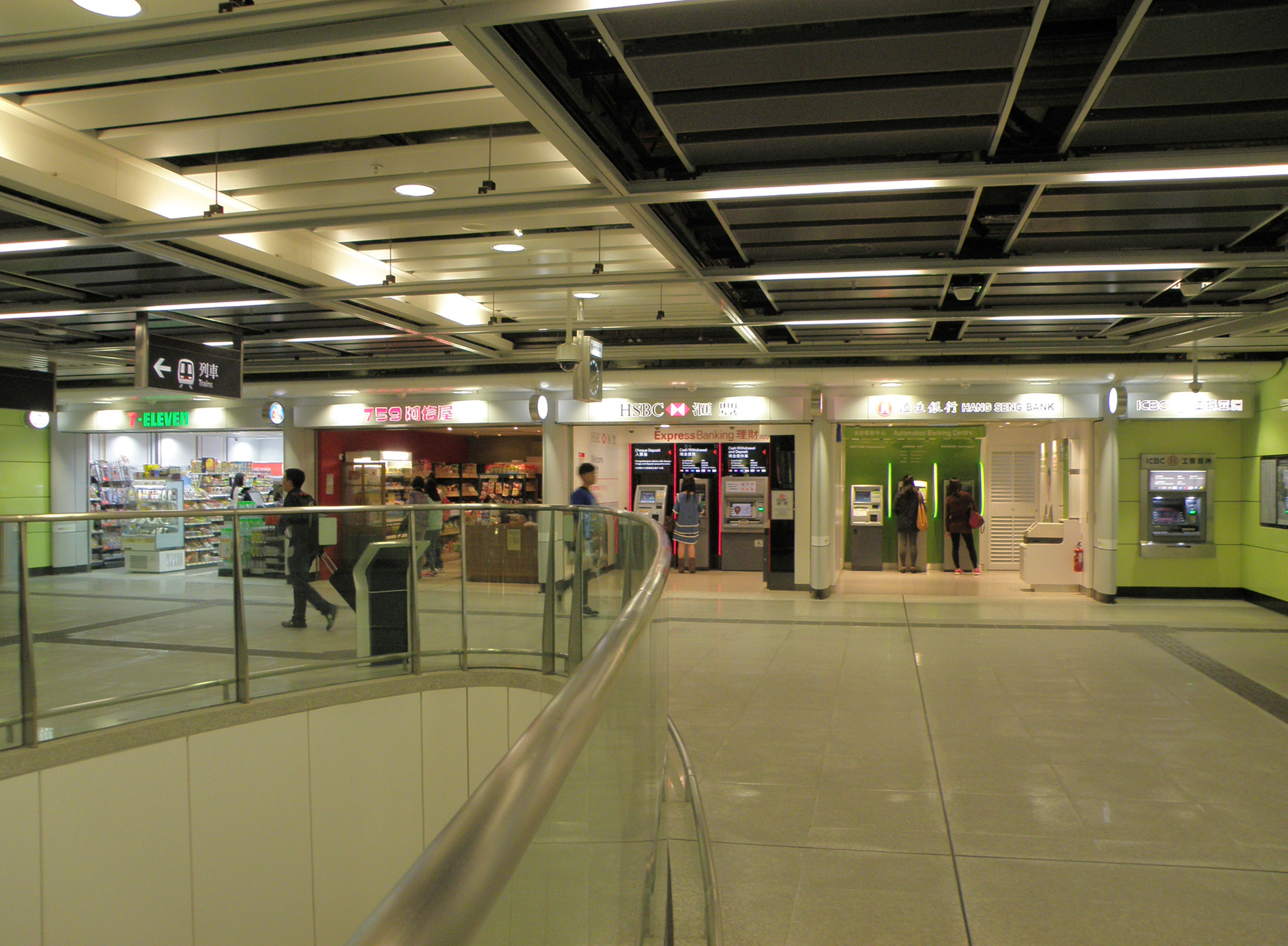
Shops (East Concourse)

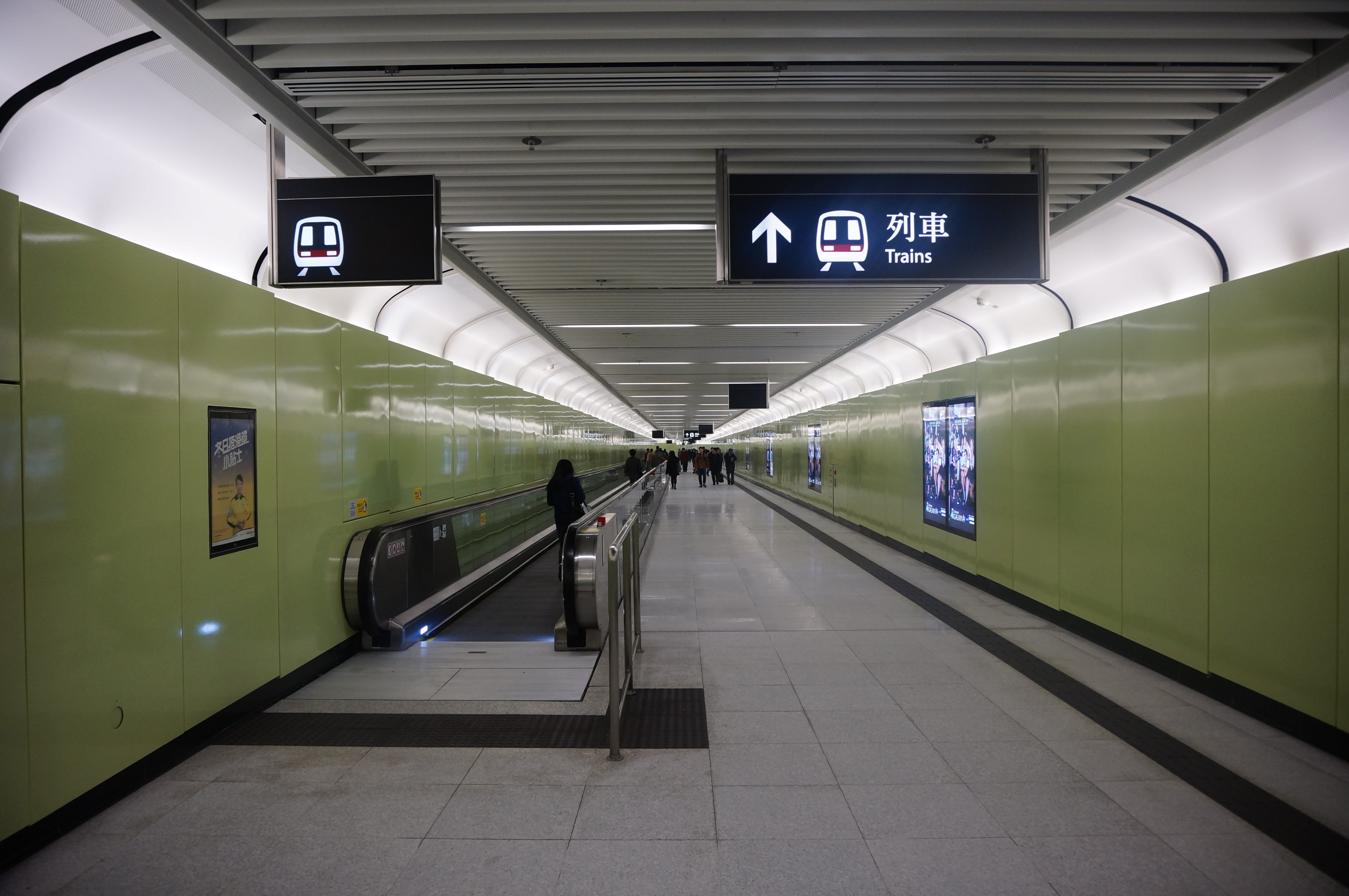
Walkways

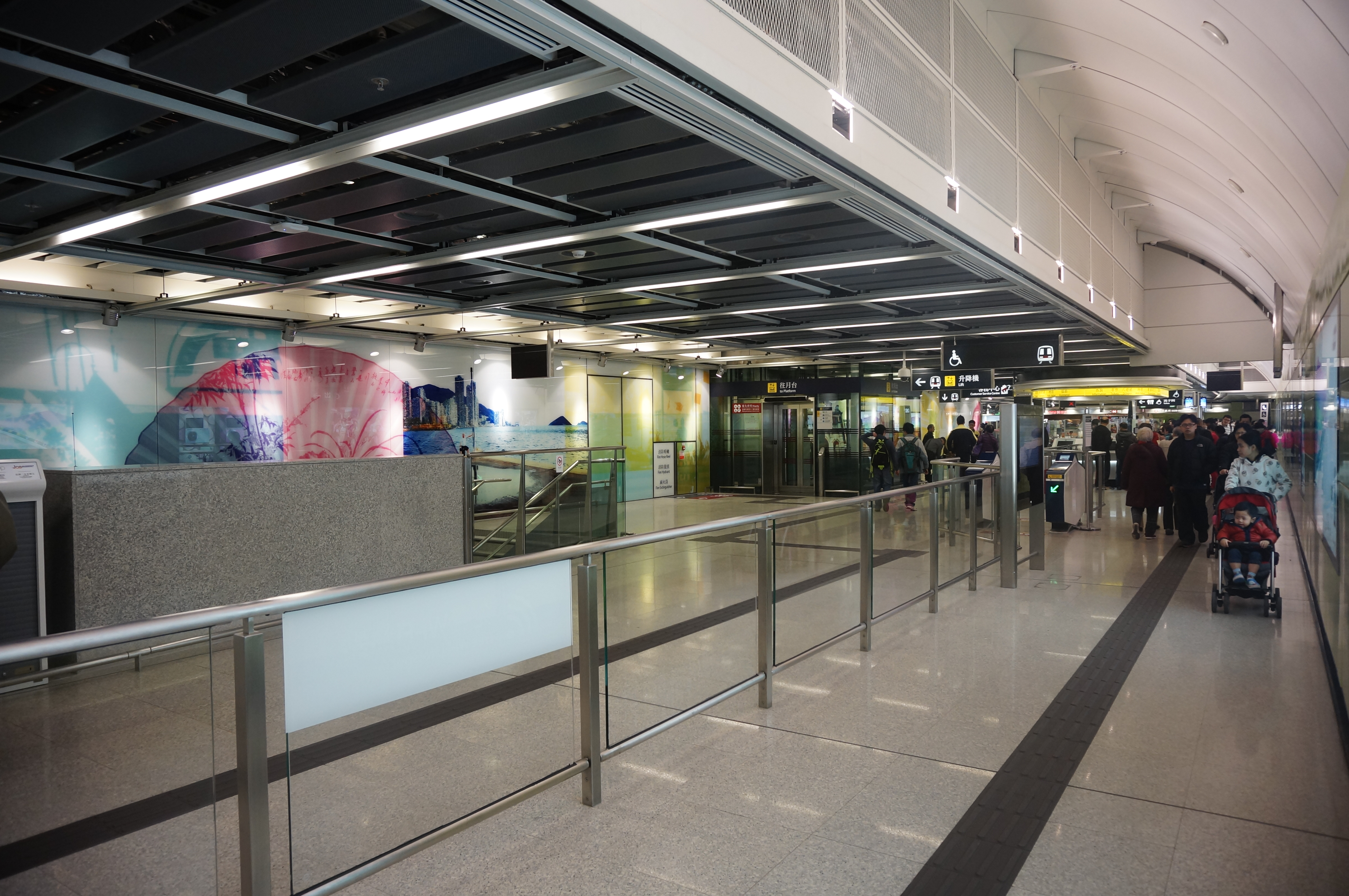
Concourse

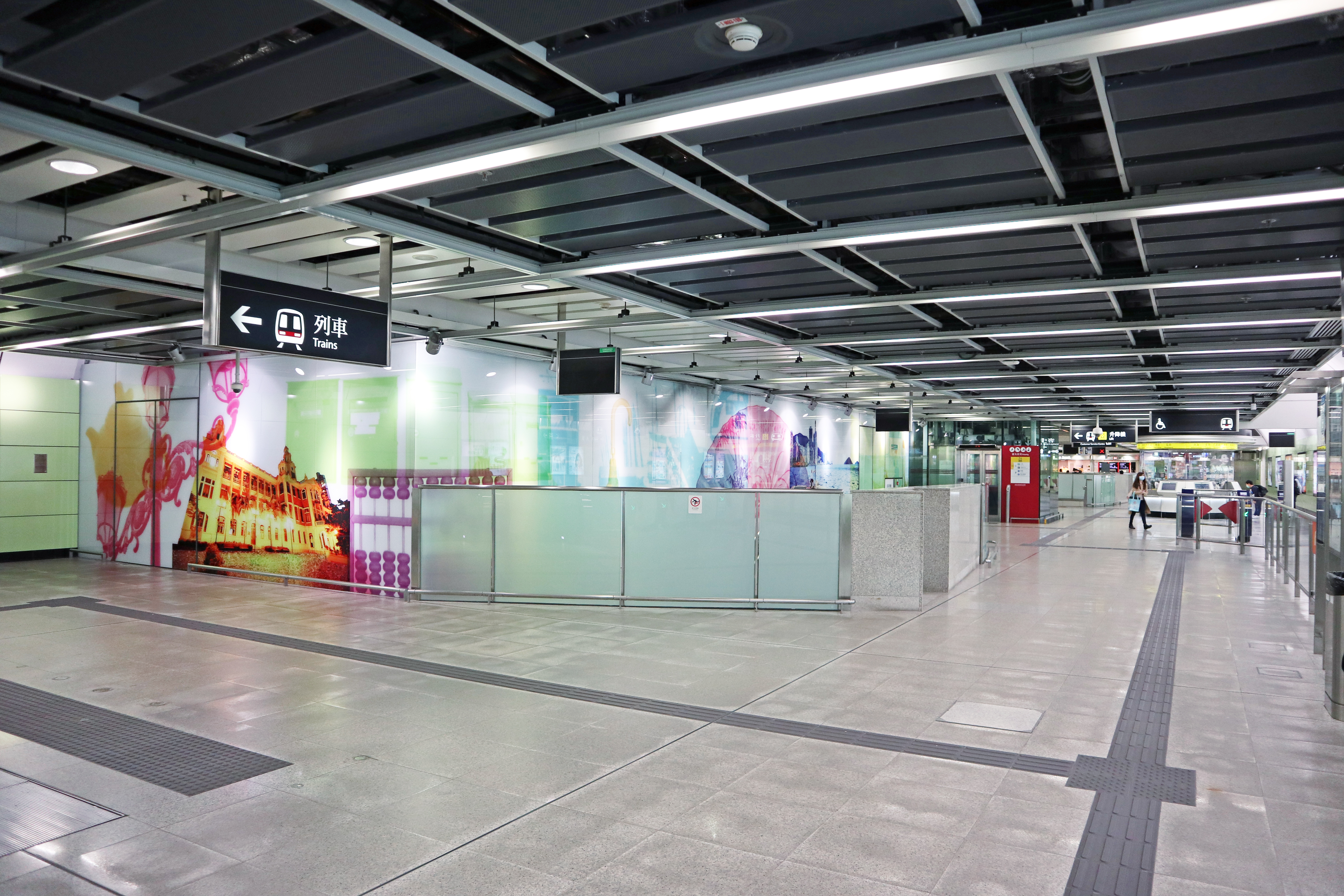
