= Whitty Street =

Street in Hong Kong

Coordinates: 22°17′11.1″N 114°8′11.8″E

- Traditional Chinese: 屈地街
Transcriptions
Yue: Cantonese
- Yale Romanization: Wāt deih gāai
- Jyutping: Wat^{1} dei^{6} gaai^{1}

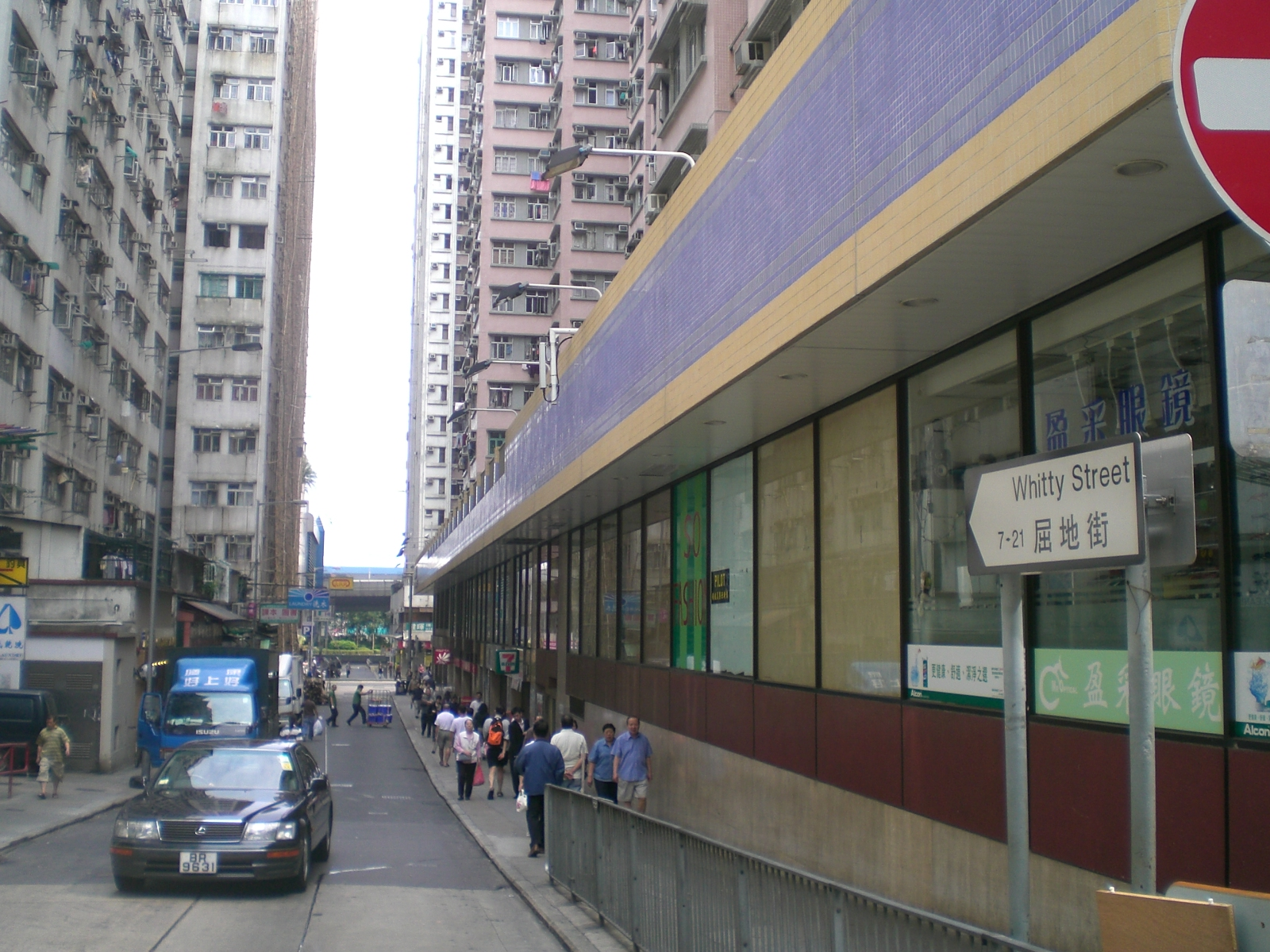
Whitty Street

Whitty Street is a street in Shek Tong Tsui, Hong Kong Island, Hong Kong. Named after R.C. Whitty, the first manager of Hong Kong and China Gas Company, the street is well known as one of seven terminals of the Hong Kong Tramways. The road starts from Queen's Road West, crossing Des Voeux Road West and ends in Connaught Road West.

In the 1970s, there was a plan for an MTR station (named Whitty station) to be built beneath the street for the residents of Shek Tong Tsui. Space is reserved for the exit of the future station. Nonetheless, the plan has never come to fruition. A new plan suggests that a station would be built near the private housing estate The Belcher's instead of on Whitty Street.

These MTR proposals were eventually superseded by the West Island line extension, which opened HKU station just south of Shek Tong Tsui. HKU station's Exit B1 opens directly onto the southern end of Whitty Street.

== See also ==
- List of streets and roads in Hong Kong
