= Baguio Villa =

Housing estate in Pokfulam, Hong Kong

Coordinates: 22.2619°N 114.1330°E

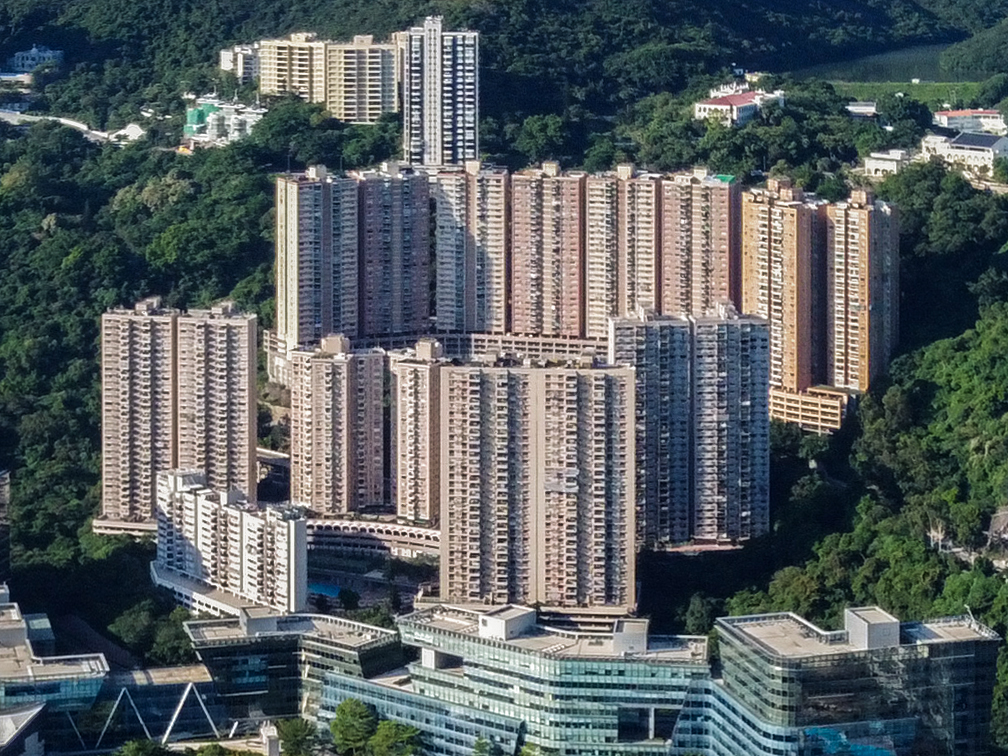
- Traditional Chinese: 碧瑤灣
- Simplified Chinese: 碧瑶湾
Transcriptions
Standard Mandarin
- Hanyu Pinyin: Bì Yáo wān
Yue: Cantonese
- Jyutping: bik1 jiu4 waan1

Baguio Villa (Chinese: 碧瑤灣) is a large scale luxury private housing estate located in Pok Fu Lam, Southern District, Hong Kong. It is divided by Victoria Road into Upper Baguio Villa (555 Victoria Road) and Lower Baguio Villa (550 Victoria Road).

== Configuration ==
The estate was developed by New World Development in the late 1970s, and was completed in December 1979. The entire estate consists of a total of 1515 residential units, configured in 33 blocks, numbered from 16 to 48 inclusive. With total area up to 800,000 square feet (74,000 m^{2}), only one-tenth was reserved for the construction of residential towers. Unit area ranges from 1,100 square feet (100 m^{2}) to 2,700 square feet (250 m^{2}).

Upper Baguio Villa consists of blocks 19-27 (odd numbers) and 20-26 (even numbers); Lower Baguio Villa, which consists of blocks 16-18 and 28-48 (even numbers), is close to the Cyberport.

== Facilities ==
There is a swimming pool, a tennis court, and a playground in both Upper and Lower Baguio Villa for the residents' use. There is a Shell gas station situated in-between Upper and Lower Baguio Villa.

== Shopping ==
There is a ParknShop Supermarket located in Lower Baguio Villa and the Cyberport shopping complex is within walking distance.

== Transportation ==
There are six minibuses serving Baguio Villa. Minibus 8 runs only in the morning for 3 departures towards Central only (previously running all day). Minibus 8X runs between Baguio Villa and Central (Exchange Square) every 5 minutes. The 8X does not serve Upper Baguio Villa before 8:30, so passengers can use minibuses 8 or 28. Minibus 28 runs between Baguio Villa (with the terminus in Upper Baguio Villa) and Causeway Bay (Sun Wui Road), via Central and Cotton Tree Drive. The 28S runs the same route but not serving Central, instead going via Kennedy Road. The 28 and 28S services both use Bonham Road and Caine Road, with bus service 28 going via Old Bailey Street into Hollywood Road. The 28S has a frequency of 30 minutes after 8:00 am The 28 service after 8:00 runs hourly. Minibus 28X runs between Baguio Villa and Causeway Bay but going via Hill Road Flyover non-stop to AIA building in Central, and then resuming the normal 28 route. the 28X runs only in the morning with 3 departures Causeway Bay bound only. The 28 service runs every 5 minutes from 7-8 am. The cost per ride is 10.0HKD for 28 & 28M & 28X and 9.4HKD for 8 & 8X respectively. The HR42 shuttle bus service runs between Baguio Villa and Kennedy Town MTR station. The Citybus route 73 bus to Stanley Market can be caught from Cyberport.

== Landslide ==
There was a landslide at Baguio Villa on 8 May 1992 caused by torrential rains, killing four people. Hong Kong's rainstorm warning system was implemented as a result.

== Education ==
Baguio Villa is in Primary One Admission (POA) School Net 18. Within the school net are multiple aided schools (operated independently but funded with government money) and Hong Kong Southern District Government Primary School.
