= Shek Tong Tsui =

Shek Tong Tsui 石塘咀 / 石塘嘴 Belcher Point
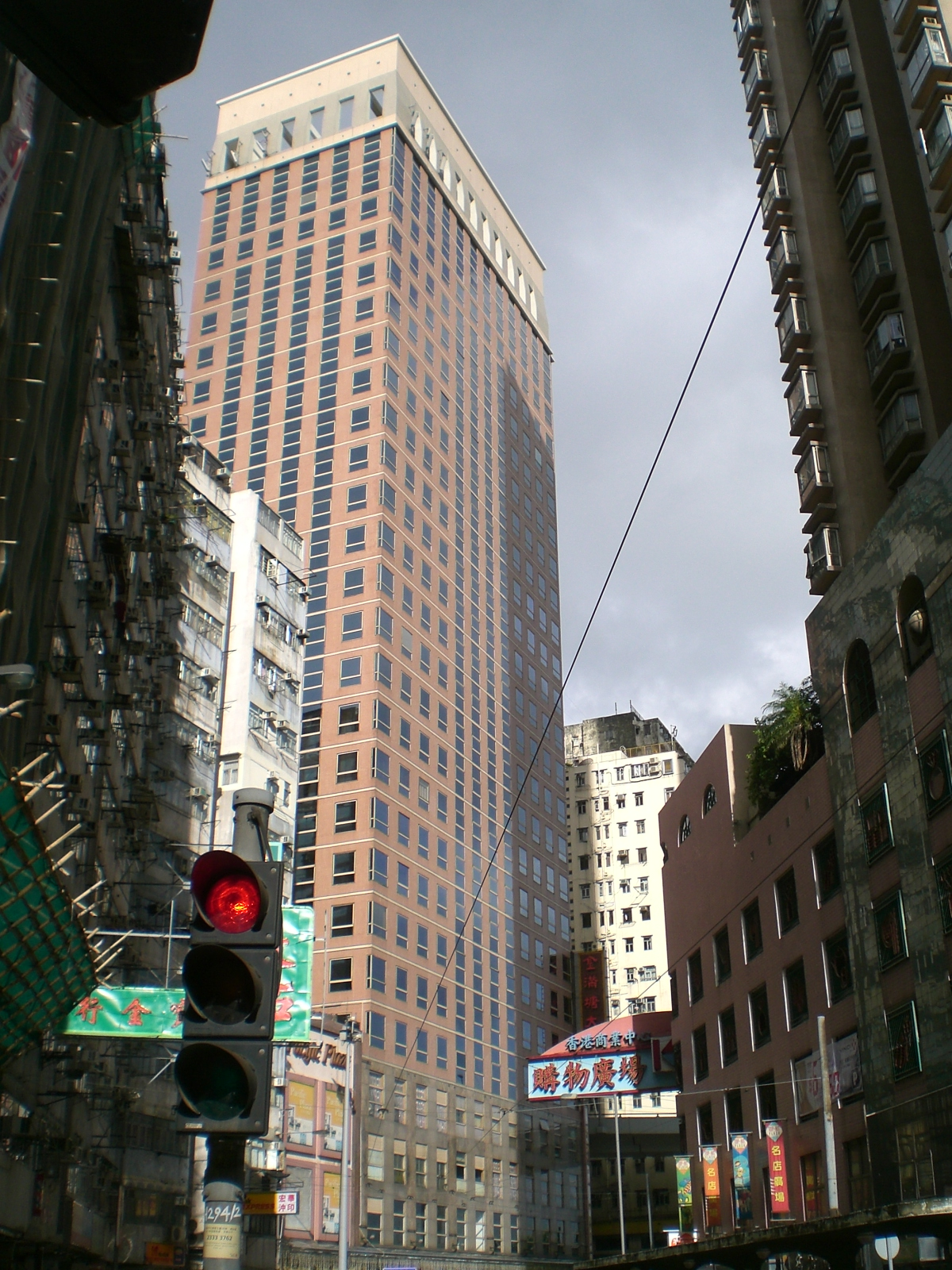
- Shek Tong Tsui near Pacific Plaza
- Interactive map of Shek Tong Tsui
- Coordinates: 22.2871°N 114.1357°E
- District: Central and Western
- First settled: 1880

Population (2011)
  - Total: 17,170

Shek Tong Tsui
- Traditional Chinese: 石塘咀 石塘嘴
- Cantonese Yale: Shehk tòhng tséui
- Literal meaning: "Stone Pond Mouth"
Transcriptions
Standard Mandarin
- Hanyu Pinyin: Shí táng zuǐ
Yue: Cantonese
- Yale Romanization: Shehk tòhng tséui
- Jyutping: Shek6 tong4 zeoi2
- IPA: [sɛk̚˨ tʰɔŋ˩ tsɵɥ˧˥]

Shek Tong Tsui (Chinese: 石塘咀 or 石塘嘴) or Belcher Point is an area in Sai Wan on Hong Kong Island in Hong Kong. Administratively, it belongs to the Central and Western District.

This area is bounded to the east by Ka On Street, north by the Victoria Harbour, south by Pok Fu Lam Road and Third Street, and west by the intersection of Queen's Road West and Belcher's Street. To the east lies Sai Ying Pun and to the west is Kennedy Town. To the south are the slopes of Victoria Peak, Lung Fu Shan and High West. While the boundaries are not de jure drawn, they are nevertheless de facto defined by Collinson Street to the west and Whitty Street to the east.

== History ==
In the early Qing Dynasty, the area around Shek Tong Tsui was just a barren hillside. It is for this reason that the "San On County Gazetteer" published in the 24th year of Jiaqing in the Qing Dynasty (1819 AD) did not contain any records of this area. As Shek Tong Tsui is rich in high-quality granite (granite) that can be used as building materials, it attracted a group of Huizhou Hakkas who made a living by cutting stones to come and mine.

In the census of 1841, the year Hong Kong Island was ceded to Britain after the Convention of Chuenpi was signed, Shek Tong Tsui appeared as a settlement for stonecutters; the population at that time was 25. By 1880, Shek Tong Tsui had become a granite quarry. After the mining was completed, a large sunken rock pond (石塘, or "Shek Tong" in Cantonese) remained, and the section facing the sea was sharper and narrower, shaped like a bird's beak, hence the name "Shek Tong Tsui" (lit. Rock Pond Beak). It was located around modern-day Hill Road and The Belcher's, and was used by the Hakka people since the 17th century. The area was first settled in 1880 by granite miners. In the early 1900s, Hong Kong Island's brothels were moved from Possession Point in Sheung Wan to this area under orders from the Hong Kong Governor Matthew Nathan. The place thus flourished as a red light district and came to its golden period. During this period, affluent Chinese in Hong Kong came to Shek Tong Tsui for entertainment, and numerous Cantonese opera theatres and Cantonese restaurants were founded in the area. It was known locally in the Cantonese phrase "tong sai fung yuet" (塘西風月), which literally means "good times west of the pond". Brothels in this area inspired numerous novels and Hong Kong films, most notably Rouge (1987), starring Anita Mui and Leslie Cheung.

This golden period lasted until the banning of prostitution by the Hong Kong Government in 1935. However, during the Japanese occupation of Hong Kong, the Japanese military government relocated all Chinese brothels to the area, which they renamed Kuramae (蔵前). Again the area boomed, with about 500 brothels, which served only Japanese.

After the Japanese defeat, the area reverted to its Chinese name, like the rest of Hong Kong. The prostitution ban returned, and Shek Tong Tsui began urbanisation for decades.

== Constituency ==
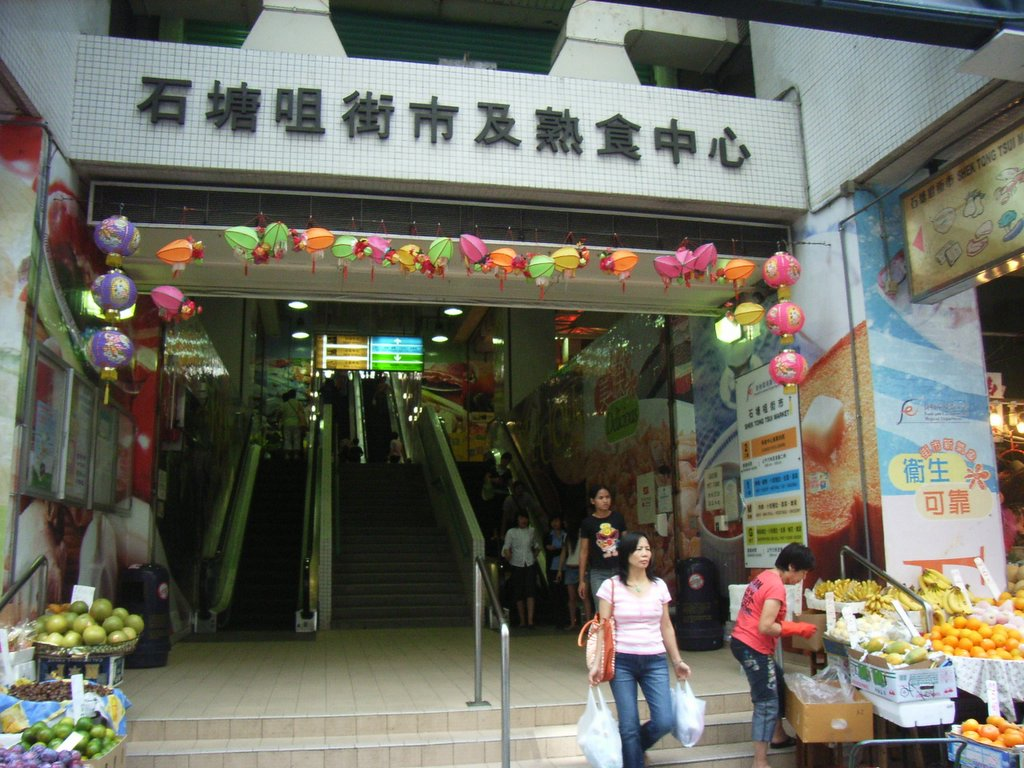
Shek Tong Tsui Municipal Services Building

A constituency in the Central and Western District is called Shek Tong Tsui, extending as far as Water Street and into Sai Ying Pun. With a population of 17,170 (2011), the constituency returns one representative to the district council. Chan Choi-hi was elected in 1999, and 2003. The major housing developments in the ward are: Chong Yip Centre, Dragonfair Garden, Elegant Garden, Kong Chian Tower, Kwan Yick Building Phase I, and Wah Ming Centre.

The Belcher constituency also covers part of Shek Tong Tsui, south of Queen's Road West. Yeung Sui Yin was elected in 2003. Wong Chit Man was elected in 1999. The Water Street constituency also lies within Shek Tong Tsui.

== Transport ==
The tram terminus near Whitty Street is one of the termini of Hong Kong Tramways. Bus and minibus services are also available along the main streets. HKU station of the West Island line, an extension of the existing MTR Island line, serves this area.

The major roads in Shek Tong Tsui are the western ends of Des Voeux Road West and Queen's Road West, Hill Road and part of Pok Fu Lam Road. Connaught Road West is the major access road. Hill Road is a "double decker" road taking traffic downhill from Pok Fu Lam Road to Connaught Road.

There are also a number of smaller terrace roads, including Yat Fu Lane, Woo Hop Street, Clarence Terrace, Po Tuck Street and South Lane.

== Education ==
Shek Tong Tsui is in Primary One Admission (POA) School Net 11. Within the school net are multiple aided schools (operated independently but funded with government money) and the following government schools: Bonham Road Government Primary School and Li Sing Primary School (李陞小學).

Hong Kong Public Libraries operates Shek Tong Tsui Library in the Shek Tong Tsui Municipal Services Building.
