= Edward Belcher =

Royal Navy Admiral (1799–1877)

Admiral Sir Edward Belcher KCB
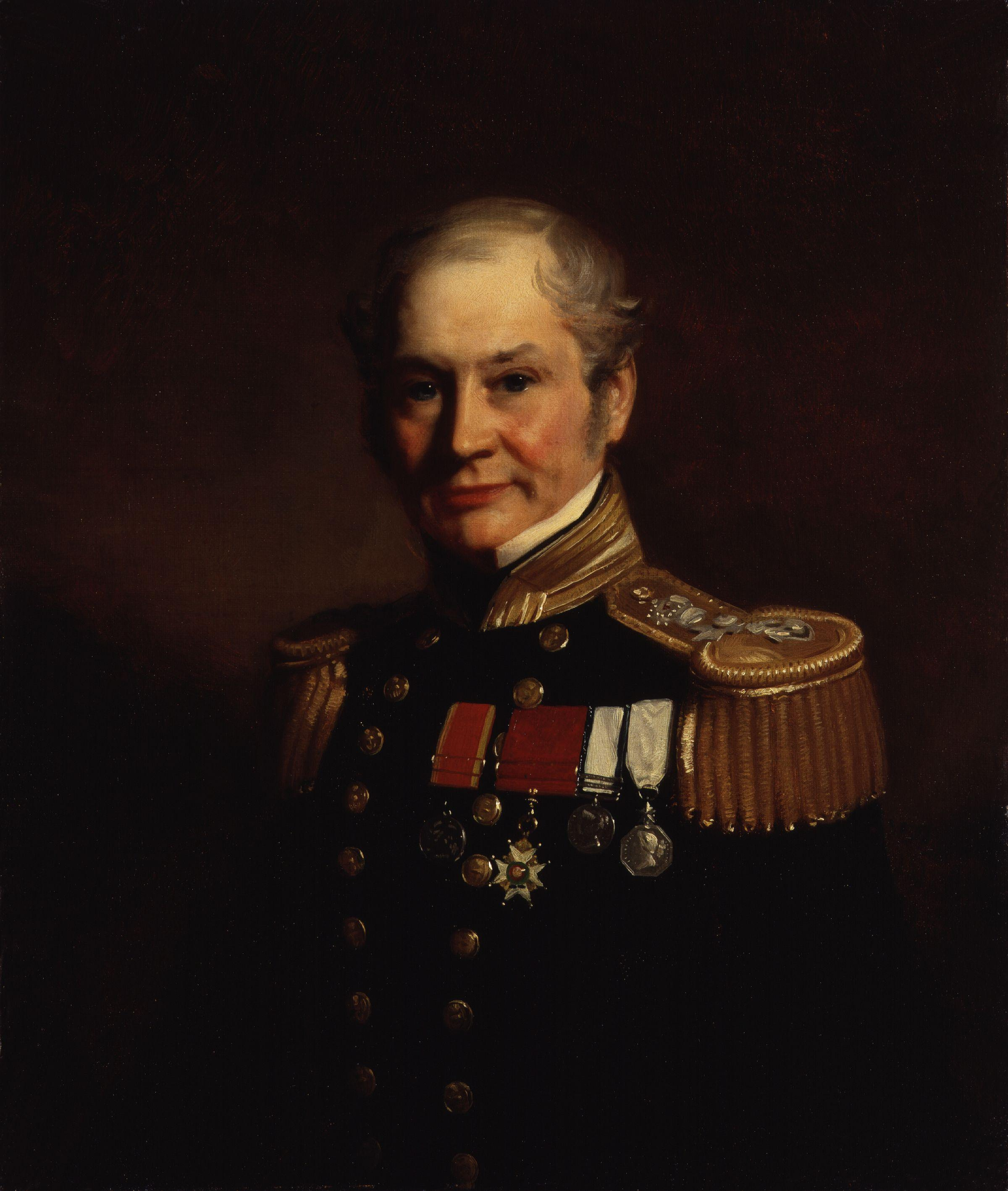
- Sir Edward Belcher c. 1859, portrait by Stephen Pearce
- Born: 27 February 1799; Halifax, Nova Scotia
- Died: 18 March 1877 (aged 78); London, England
- Spouse: Diana Jolliffe
- Military career
- Allegiance: United Kingdom
- Branch: Royal Navy
- Service years: 1812–1865
- Rank: Admiral
- Commands: HMS Sulphur; HMS Samarang; HMS Assistance
- Wars: First Anglo-Chinese War
- Awards: China War Medal (1842); Naval General Service Medal (1847); Arctic Medal (1857)

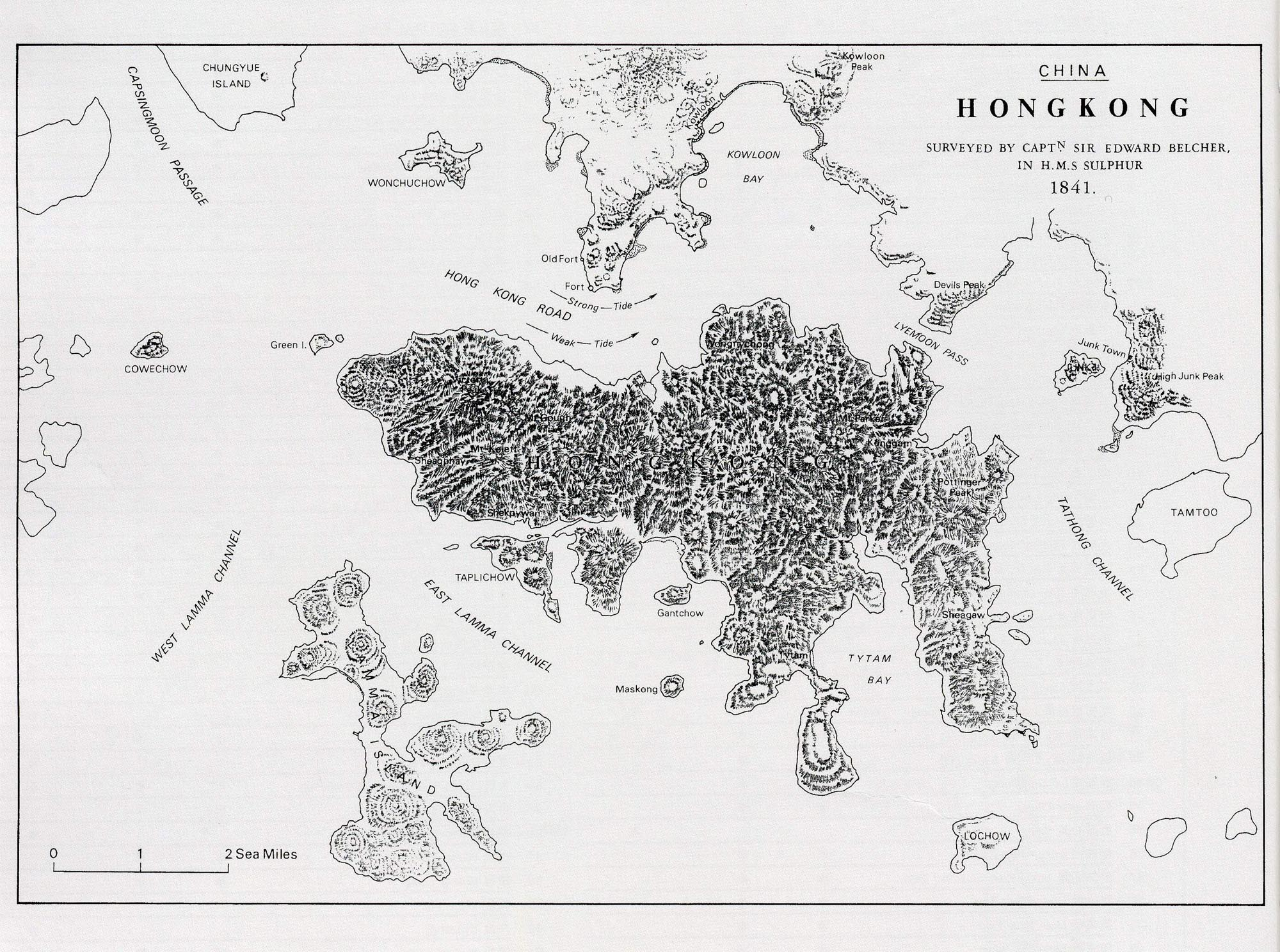
Belcher's map of Hong Kong after surveying the island in 1841, shortly before it became a British colony in 1842.

Sir Edward Belcher (27 February 1799 – 18 March 1877) was a British naval officer, hydrographer, and explorer.

== Biography ==
=== Early life ===
Belcher was born in Halifax, Nova Scotia, the second son of Andrew Belcher and entered the Royal Navy in 1812.

He was the great-grandson of Jonathan Belcher, who served as a colonial governor of Massachusetts, New Hampshire, and New Jersey.

=== Surveys ===
In 1825, he accompanied Frederick William Beechey's expedition to the Pacific and Bering Strait as a surveyor. In 1835 he was surveying in the Irish Sea in HMS Lightning, and in 1836 he commanded a surveying ship on the north and west coasts of Africa and in the British seas. Belcher took up the work which Beechey had left unfinished on the Pacific coast of South America. He was on board HMS Sulphur, which was ordered to return to England in 1839 via the Trans-Pacific route. Belcher made various observations at a number of islands which he visited, having been delayed by being despatched to take part in the war in China in 1840.

On 25 January 1841, Commander Belcher landed on Possession Point at the north shore Hong Kong Island, and made the first British survey of Hong Kong harbour. After the war's end in 1842 he reached home and for his services was made a Knight Bachelor in the following year. He was then engaged on HMS Samarang, in surveying work in the East Indies, the Philippines, Port Hamilton, and other places, until 1847.

=== Arctic expedition ===
In 1852 Belcher led the last and largest Admiralty expedition to attempt to find and rescue Sir John Franklin. He was also to look for his former surveying officer in Hong Kong, Sir Richard Collinson, and Sir Robert McClure, whose ships had not been seen after entering the Bering Strait. He did a great deal of sledge exploration, rescued McClure and abandoned four of his five ships in the ice.

He had five ships: HMS Assistance (Belcher), HMS Resolute (Henry Kellett, second mate George Nares), the steam tenders Pioneer (Sherard Osborn) and Intrepid (Sir Leopold McClintock) and the depot ship HMS North Star (William Pullen). Belcher and one tender were to enter the Wellington Channel, between Cornwallis Island and Devon Island, where Franklin was thought to be, while Kellett was to go west to Melville Island and look for Collinson and McClure. North Star was to stay at Beechey Island as a supply base.

He left the Nore in April 1852. By early winter Assistance and Pioneer were frozen in at Northumberland Sound to the north of Wellington Channel while Resolute and Intrepid were frozen in off Melville Island – the first ships this far West since Sir William Edward Parry in 1819. A great deal of exploration was done by manhauled sledges. In April 1853 Leopold McClintock and others left Resolute on sledges and returned 105 days later, having covered 1,400 miles (2,300 km) and discovered Prince Patrick Island.

Another party went West and discovered Robert McClure, whose ship was frozen in at Mercy Bay. Belcher went north by sledge and found a channel at the northern tip of Devon Island, hinting that Franklin might have used it to escape to Baffin Bay. When the ice broke up that summer, he pushed his ships up Wellington Channel and became trapped again.

By February 1854, Belcher was becoming increasingly worried about the safety of his ships and men. In April he ordered Kellett to abandon his ships and return by sledge to North Star. Belcher abandoned his two ships in late July. Aided by two ships that showed up at Beechey Island (Phoenix and Breadalbane), the whole party returned to England. Belcher went through a court martial, which was automatic for any captain who had lost a ship.

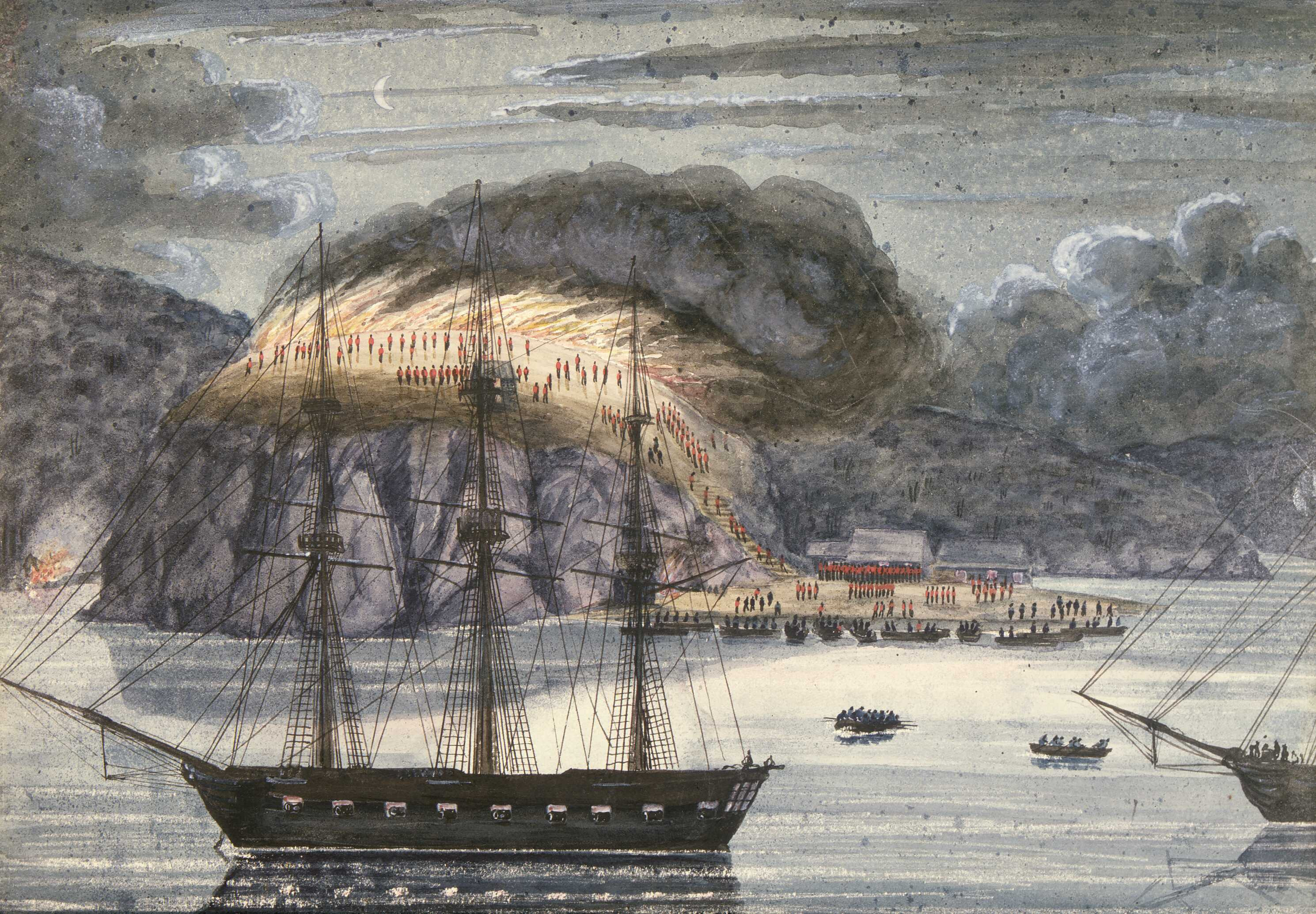
HMS North Star destroying Pomare's Pā, 1845. Painting by John Williams.

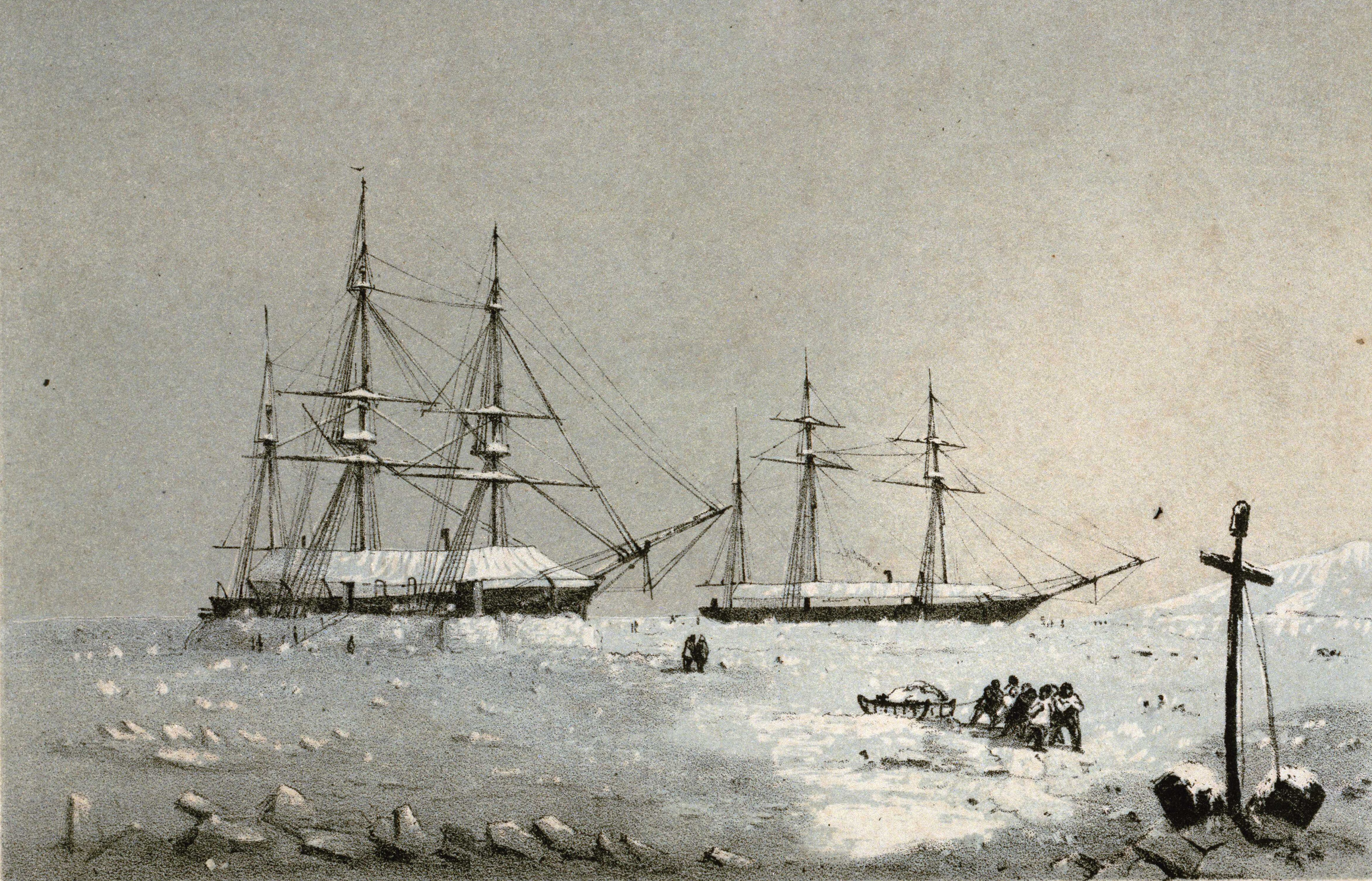
HMS Resolute and Intrepid winter quarters, Melville Island, 1852–53

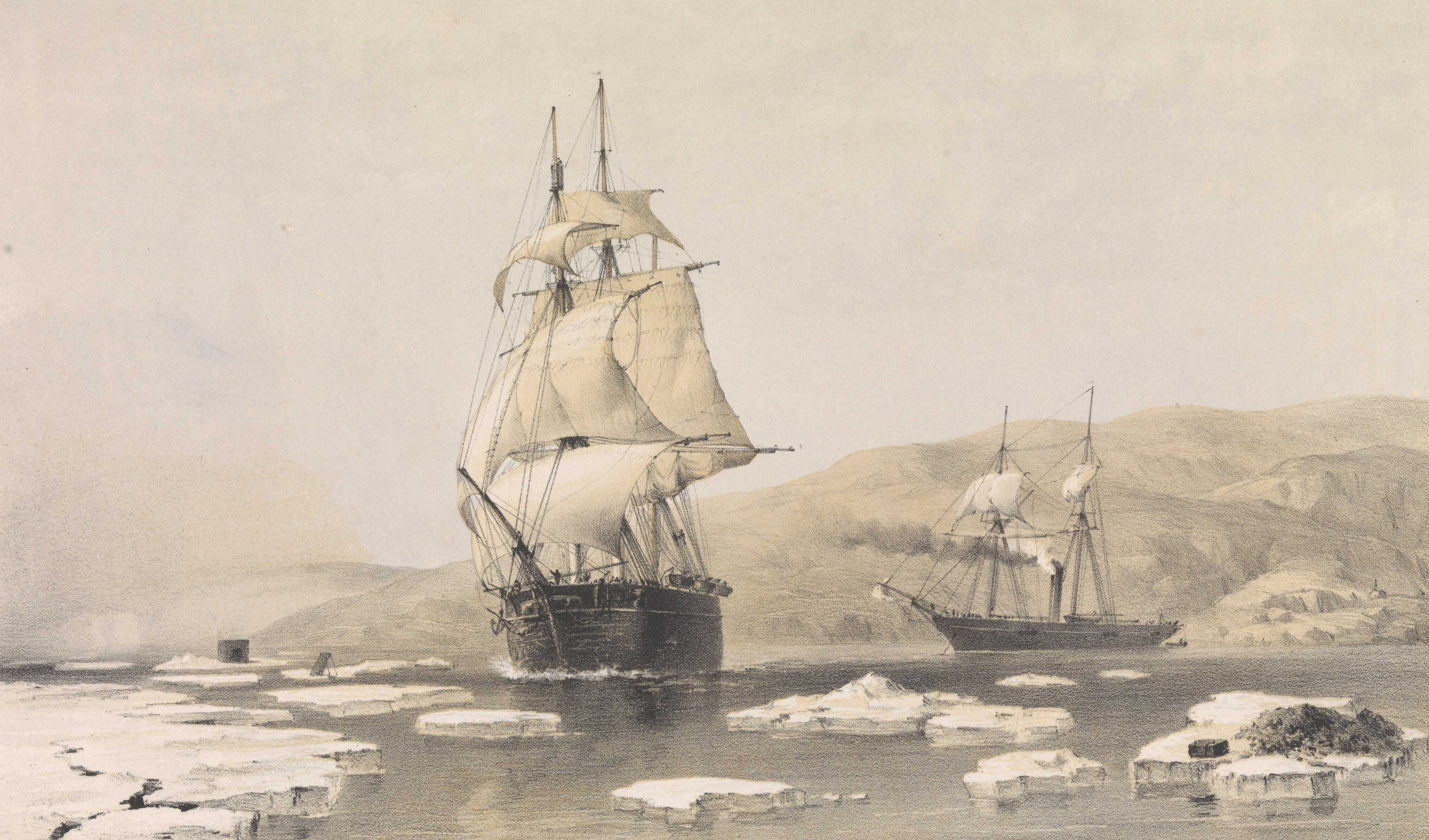
HMS Assistance and Pioneer breaking out of winter quarters, 1854

He was exonerated, but his sword was returned to him "without observation". He never again received an active command. Curiously Resolute broke free of the ice and drifted all the way to Davis Strait, southwest of Greenland, where it was picked up by an American whaler. The American government graciously returned the ship to the United Kingdom, and when many years later the ship was broken up, its timbers were used to make a desk for the American president by way of a thank you. This Resolute desk, a gift from Queen Victoria, is still used today in the Oval Office.

Despite his achievements, Belcher would later be described by a Hydrographer of the Navy as “a tyrannical martinet who made every ship he commanded a floating hell.”

=== Later life ===
Following his last active service, Belcher was appointed Knight Commander of the Order of the Bath in 1867, and an admiral in 1872.

== Personal life ==
He was briefly married to Diana Jolliffe, stepdaughter of Captain Peter Heywood; that marriage ending upon her application for legal separation for his having infected her with venereal disease.

== Legacy ==
Belcher is commemorated in Hong Kong through Belcher's Street, Belcher Bay and The Belcher's in Kennedy Town. His name is also commemorated in the Belcher Islands, in the Canadian Arctic. He is also commemorated with a plaque in the Admiralty Garden, CFB Halifax.

A highly venomous seasnake, Hydrophis belcheri, is also named in his honour. Belcher collected the holotype which is housed in the Natural History Museum, London.

== Works ==
- Treatise on Nautical Surveying (1835)
- Narrative of a Voyage Round the World (1843). (Vol. 1 / Vol. 2).
- Narrative of the Voyage of H.M.S. Samarang, During the Years 1843–46 (1848). (Vol. 1 / Vol. 2).
- The Last of the Arctic Voyages (1855). (Vol. 1 / Vol. 2).
- Horatio Howard Brenton (1856). (Vol. 1 / Vol. 2 / Vol. 3).

== See also ==
- European and American voyages of scientific exploration
