= Victor Yeung =

Hong Kong district councillor

Victor Yeung Ho-yin
- Traditional Chinese: 楊浩然
- Simplified Chinese: 杨浩然
Transcriptions
Standard Mandarin
- Hanyu Pinyin: Yáng Hàorán

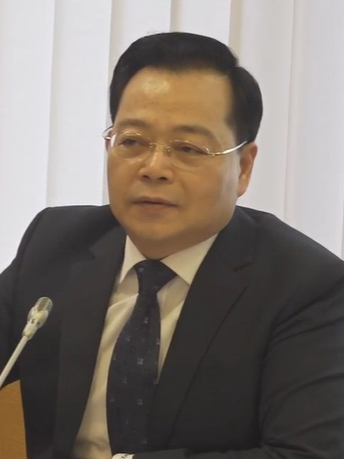
Victor Yeung attending a meeting of Central and Western District Council (2020)

Victor Yeung Ho-yin is a District Councillor for the Belcher constituency. He is a former member of the Democratic Party of Hong Kong. In 2003 he was elected with 45.3% (1,937) of the vote. He retained the seat in 2007 with 52.7% (2,135) of the votes. He lost the seat in 2011 and 2015 and regained in 2019 with 52.66% (4,002) of the vote.
