= Belcher (constituency) =

Former Hong Kong constituency

Coordinates: 22.2836°N 114.1312°E

- Former Elected constituency for the Central & Western District Council
- Boundary of Belcher in Central & Western District
- District: Central & Western
- Legislative Council constituency: Hong Kong Island West
- Population: 20,077 (2019)
- Electorate: 10,321 (2019)

Former constituency
- Created: 1994
- Abolished: 2023
- Number of members: One
- Created from: Kennedy Town East; Sai Ying Pun West

Belcher was one of the 15 constituencies in the Central and Western District of Hong Kong.

It returned one member of the district council until it was abolished the 2023 electoral reforms.

Belcher constituency was loosely based on the area around The Belcher's in Shek Tong Tsui with estimated population of 20,077.

== Councillors represented ==
Election	Member	Party	%
1994	Hung Wing-tat	Democratic	N/A
1999	Wong Chit-man	DAB	52.17
2003	Victor Yeung Sui-yin	Democratic	45.31
2007	Victor Yeung Sui-yin	Democratic	52.73
2011	Malcolm Lam Wai-wing	Independent	47.96
2015	David Yip Wing-shing	Independent	50.73
2019	Victor Yeung Sui-yin	Democratic	52.66

== Election results ==
=== 2010s ===
Central & Western District Council Election, 2019: Belcher
Party	Candidate	Votes	%	±%
Democratic	Victor Yeung Sui-yin	4,002	52.66	
Independent	David Yip Wing-shing	3,521	46.34	−4.37
Nonpartisan	Fung King-yin	76	1.00	
Majority		479	6.32	
Turnout		7,617	73.81	
Democratic gain from Independent		Swing		

Central & Western District Council Election, 2015: Belcher
Party	Candidate	Votes	%	±%
Nonpartisan	David Yip Wing-shing	2,397	50.7	
Democratic	Victor Yeung Sui-yin	2,328	49.3	+2.2
Majority		69	1.4	–3.5
Turnout		4,786	49.4	
Nonpartisan gain from Independent		Swing		

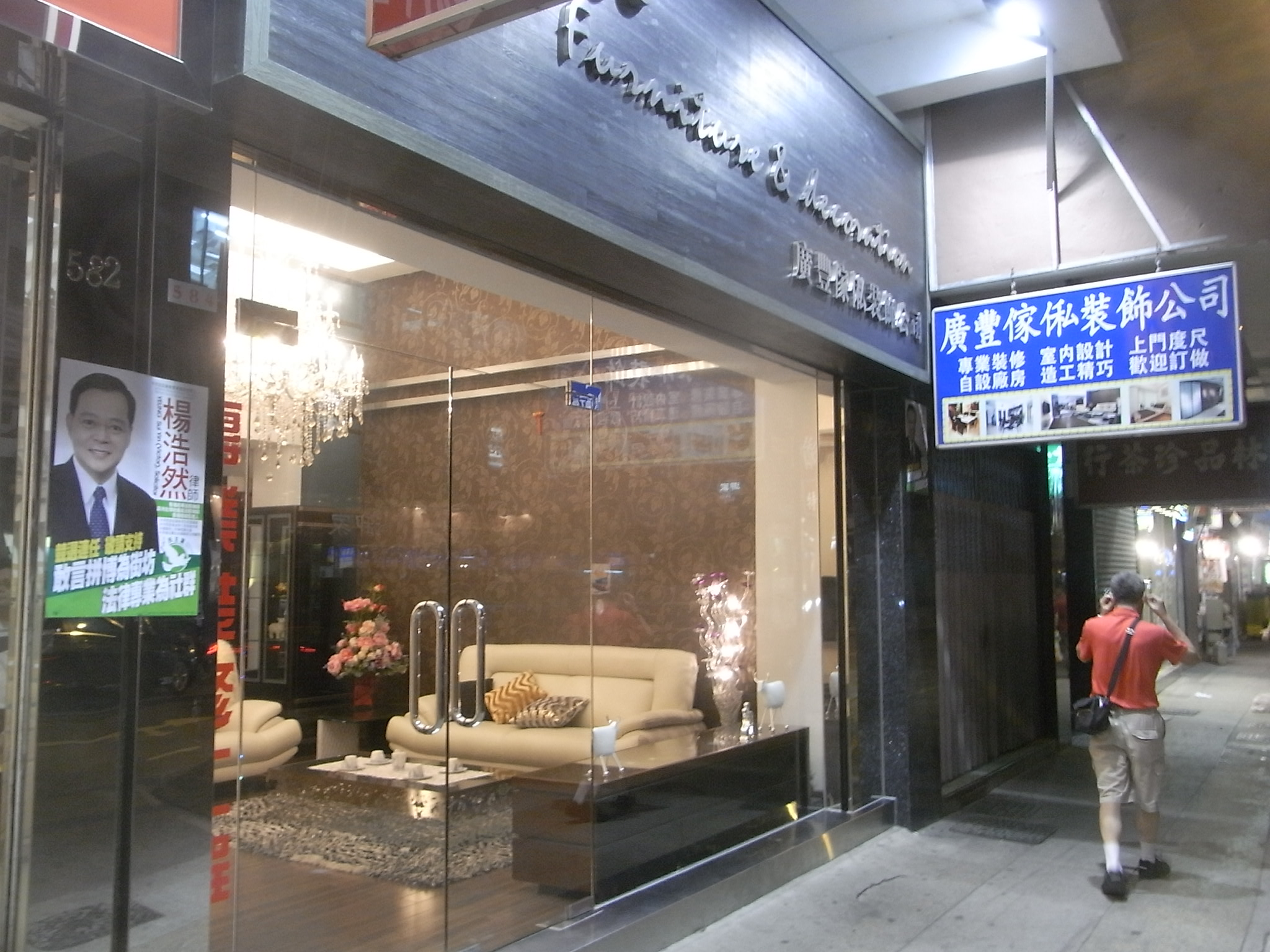
Victor Yeung Sui-yin's election poster in the 2011 election.

Central & Western District Council Election, 2011: Belcher
Party	Candidate	Votes	%	±%
Independent	Malcolm Lam Wai-wing	1,968	48.0	N/A
Democratic	Victor Yeung Sui-yin	1,935	47.1	−5.6
People Power	William Wong Ka-lok	201	4.9	N/A
Majority		33	0.9	
Independent gain from Democratic		Swing		

=== 2000s ===
Central & Western District Council Election, 2007: Belcher
Party	Candidate	Votes	%	±%
Democratic	Victor Yeung Sui-yin	2,135	52.7	+7.4
DAB	Wong Wang-hong	1,835	45.3	+12.3
Independent	Peter Fong Siu-wah	79	2.0	N/A
Majority		300	7.4	−2.9
Democratic hold		Swing		

Central & Western District Council Election, 2003: Belcher
Party	Candidate	Votes	%	±%
Democratic	Victor Yeung Sui-yin	1,937	45.3	
DAB	Wong Chit-man	1,497	35.0	−17.2
Independent	Lam Kee-shing	841	19.7	−28.1
Majority		440	10.3	+5.9
Democratic gain from DAB		Swing	+5.2	

=== 1990s ===
Central & Western District Council Election, 1999: Belcher
Party	Candidate	Votes	%	±%
DAB	Wong Chit-man	1,262	52.2	N/A
Democratic	Lam Kee-shing	1,157	47.8	N/A
Majority		105	4.4	N/A
DAB gain from Democratic		Swing		

Central & Western District Board Election, 1994: Belcher
Party	Candidate	Votes	%	±%
Democratic	Hung Wing-tat	uncontested		
Democratic win (new seat)				
