= Victoria Road, Hong Kong =

Road in Hong Kong

Coordinates: 22°16′23″N 114°07′32″E

Victoria Road
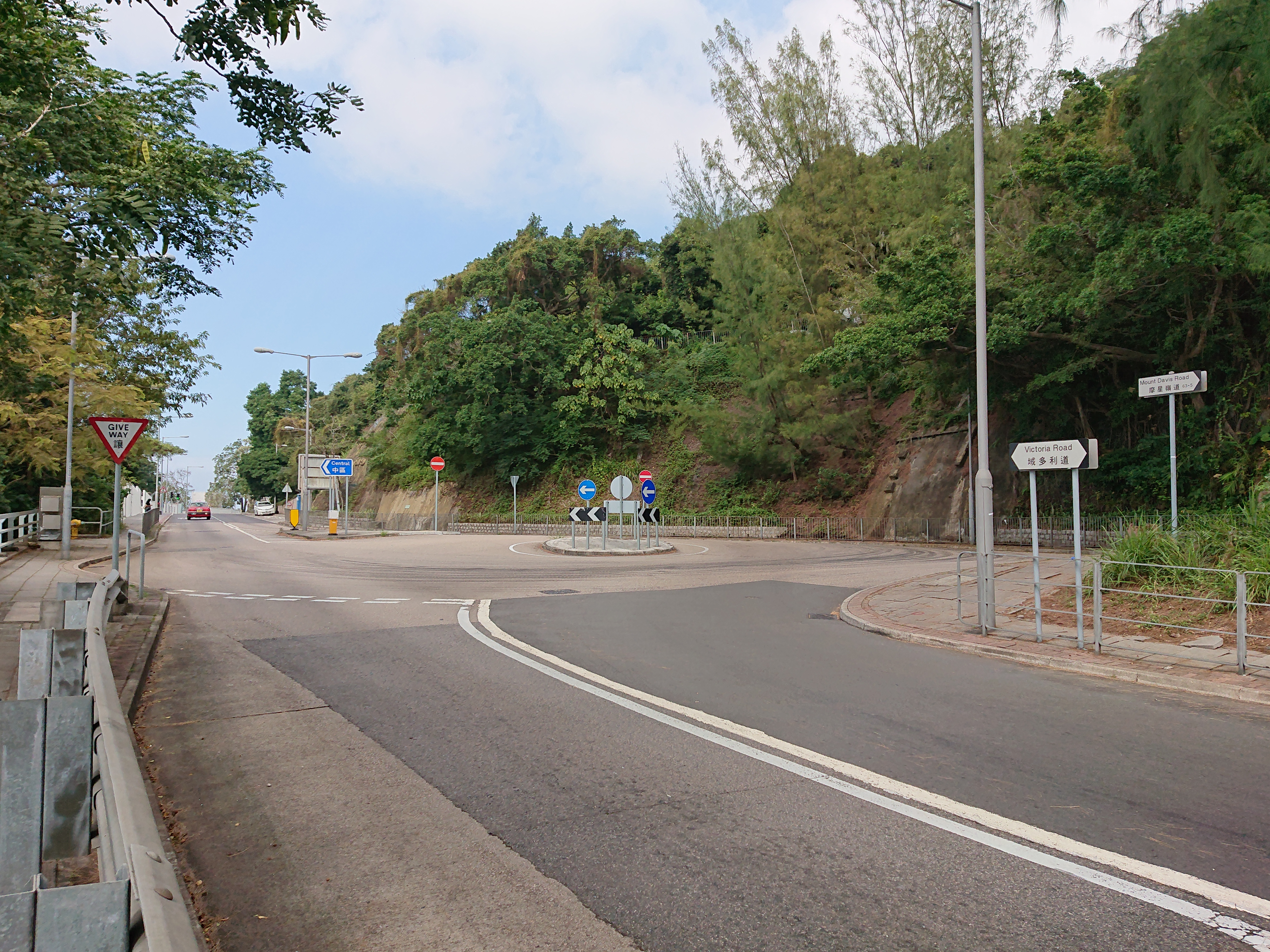
- Victoria Road at an intersection near Mount Davis
- Native name: 域多利道 (Yue Chinese)
- Length: 5.9 kilometres (3.7 mi)
- Location: Hong Kong Island, Hong Kong
- South end: Pok Fu Lam Road
- North end: Belcher's Street / Cadogan Street

Victoria Road, Hong Kong
- Traditional Chinese: 域多利道
Transcriptions
Standard Mandarin
- Hanyu Pinyin: Yù duōlì dào
Yue: Cantonese
- Yale Romanization: Wihk dō leih douh
- Jyutping: Wik6 do1 lei6 dou6

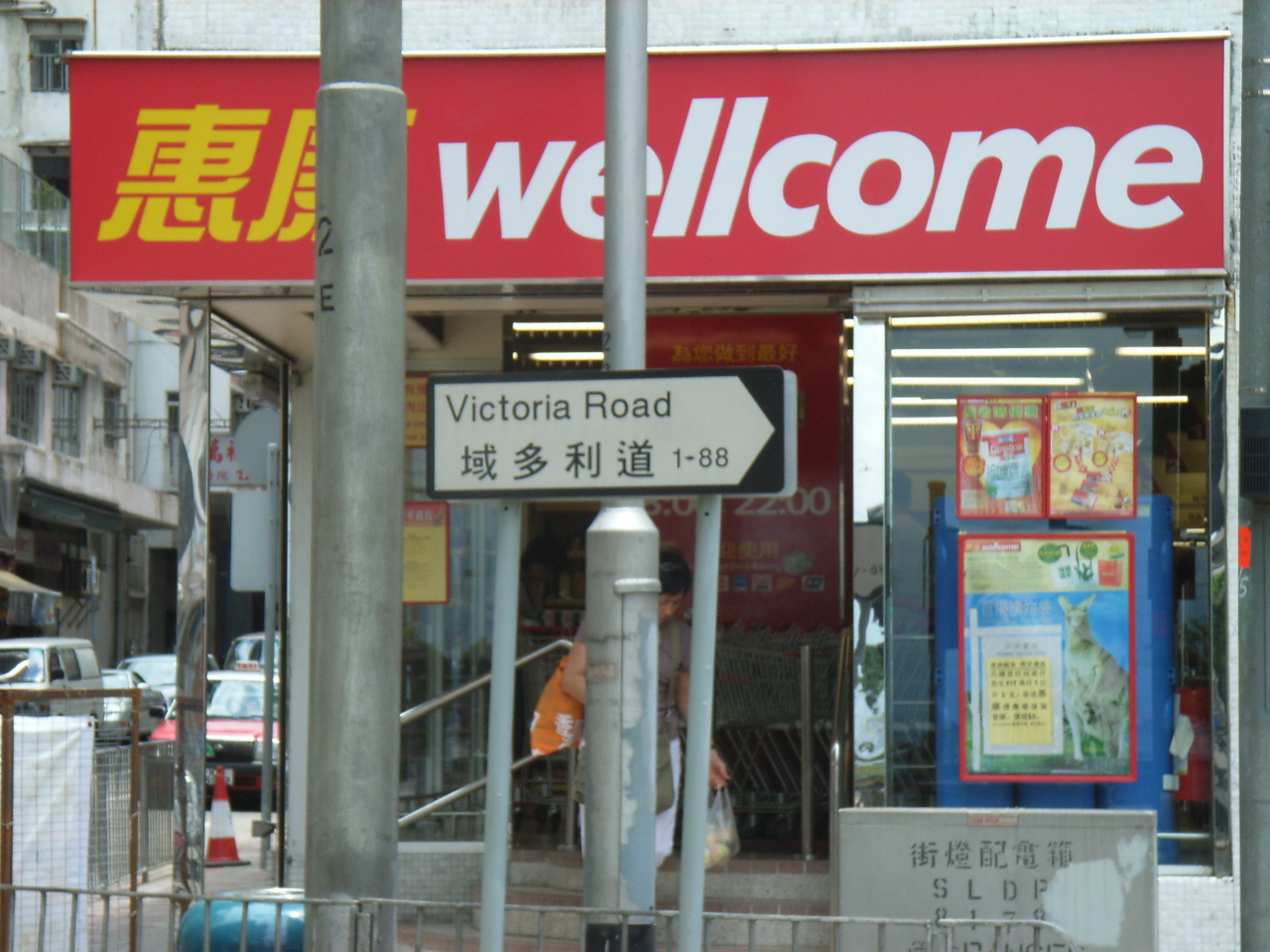
Victoria Road, Hong Kong in June 2006.

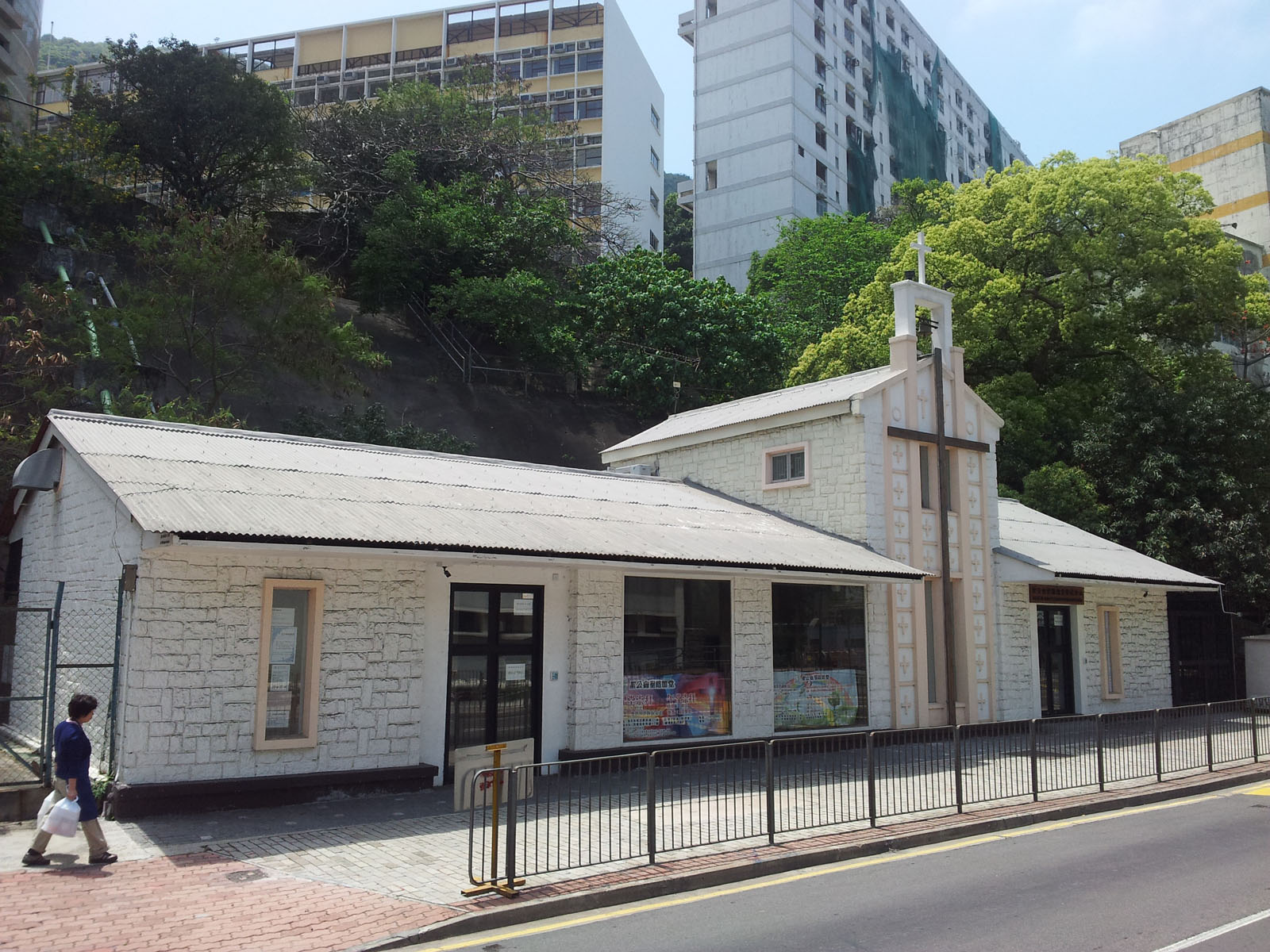
Sheng Kung Hui St. Luke's Church Pastoral Centre, along Victoria Road, in April 2012. The buildings in the background are the former campus of Hong Kong Academy (left) and the former Block B of Kennedy Town Police Quarters (right).

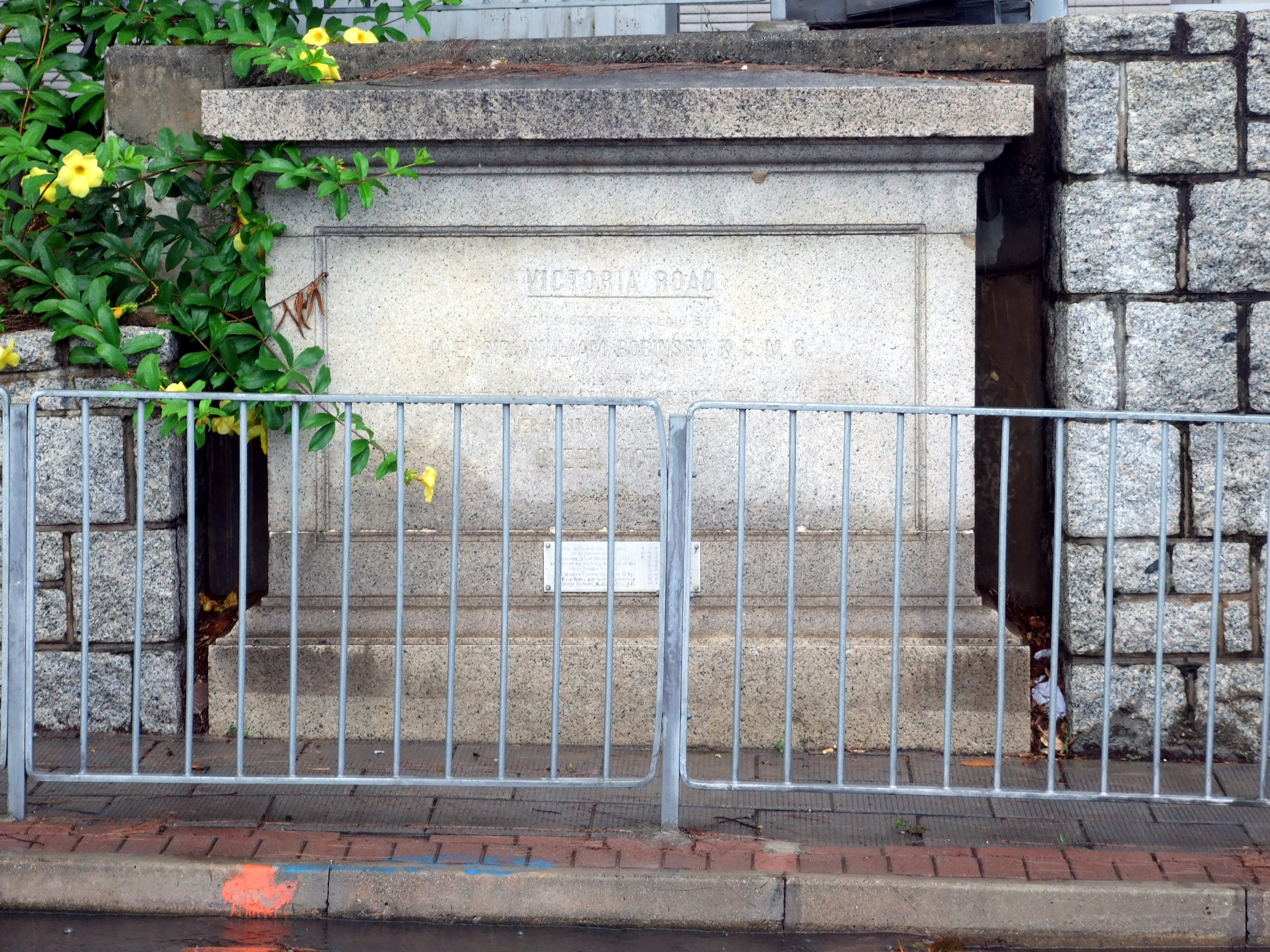
Victoria Jubilee Road foundation stone, next to the intersection with Mount Davis Road in July 2010.

Victoria Road is a main road near the west shore of Hong Kong Island in Hong Kong connecting Kennedy Town and Wah Fu and an alternative connection of Pok Fu Lam Road. It begins north with Belcher's Street in Kennedy Town and goes along Mount Davis, Sandy Bay, Telegraph Bay and Waterfall Bay and reaches in Kellett Bay.

== History ==
The road opened in 1897, the year of Queen Victoria's Diamond Jubilee, celebrating the 60th year of her reign. A stone was laid by Governor Robinson and the road was named Victoria Jubilee Road (域多利慶典道). The road was without any surfacing and only access to Chinese public cemetery in Kellett Bay. In 1903, Hong Kong Government erected a stone at the road in Kennedy Town to mark the boundary of Victoria City.

== Notable buildings ==
- The medical faculty of the University of Hong Kong
- Baguio Villa
- Former Victoria Road Detention Centre aka. Mount Davis Concentration Camp (摩星嶺集中營), which was used by the Special Branch of the Royal Hong Kong Police Force to hold political prisoners during the 1967 Leftist riots. The compound is listed as a Grade III historic building. Currently the building has been renovated and has been integrated into the Hong Kong campus of the University of Chicago.
- Villa Cecil, the residential complex home to billionaire Cecil Chao
- Hong Kong Chinese Christian Churches Union Pok Fu Lam Road Cemetery, a cemetery is managed by The Hong Kong Chinese Christian Churches Union. It was built in 1882.

== See also ==
- List of places named after Queen Victoria
- List of streets and roads in Hong Kong
