= Belcher's Street =

Street in Kennedy Town, Hong Kong

Coordinates: 22.2844°N 114.1294°E

- Chinese: 卑路乍街
Transcriptions
Standard Mandarin
- Hanyu Pinyin: Bēi lù zhà jiē
Yue: Cantonese
- Yale Romanization: Bēi louh ja gāai
- Jyutping: Bei1 lou6 za3 gaai1
- Sidney Lau: Bei^{1}Lou^{6}Ja^{3}Gaai^{1}

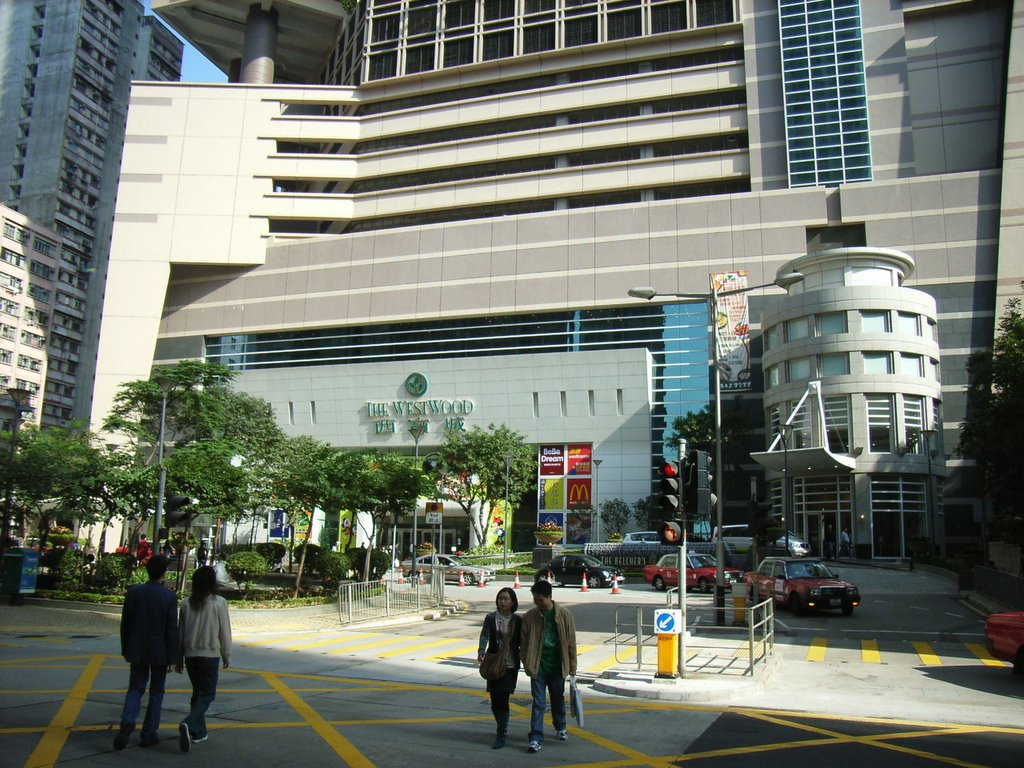
The Westwood mall at the base of The Belcher's, seen from Belcher's Street.

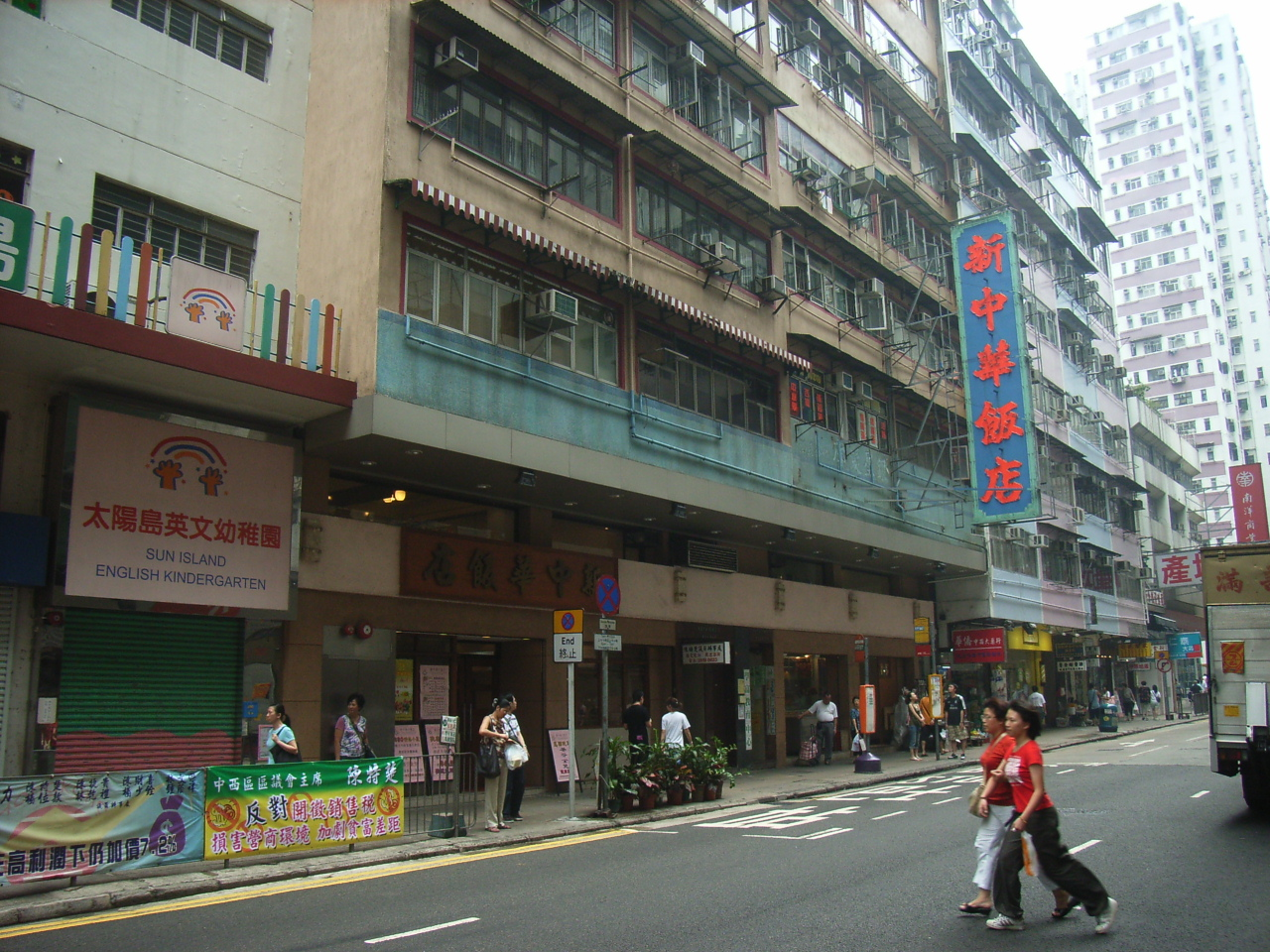
Belcher's Street, Hong Kong.

Belcher's Street (Chinese: 卑路乍街; Jyutping: bei1 lou6 zaa3 gaai1) is a major thoroughfare in Kennedy Town, Hong Kong. It runs from northeast to southwest, connecting Queen's Road West and Victoria Road. The Hong Kong Tramways Kennedy Town Terminus is located at the western end of the street.

The street is named after Edward Belcher, a Canadian-born Royal Navy officer who surveyed the harbour of Hong Kong in 1841.

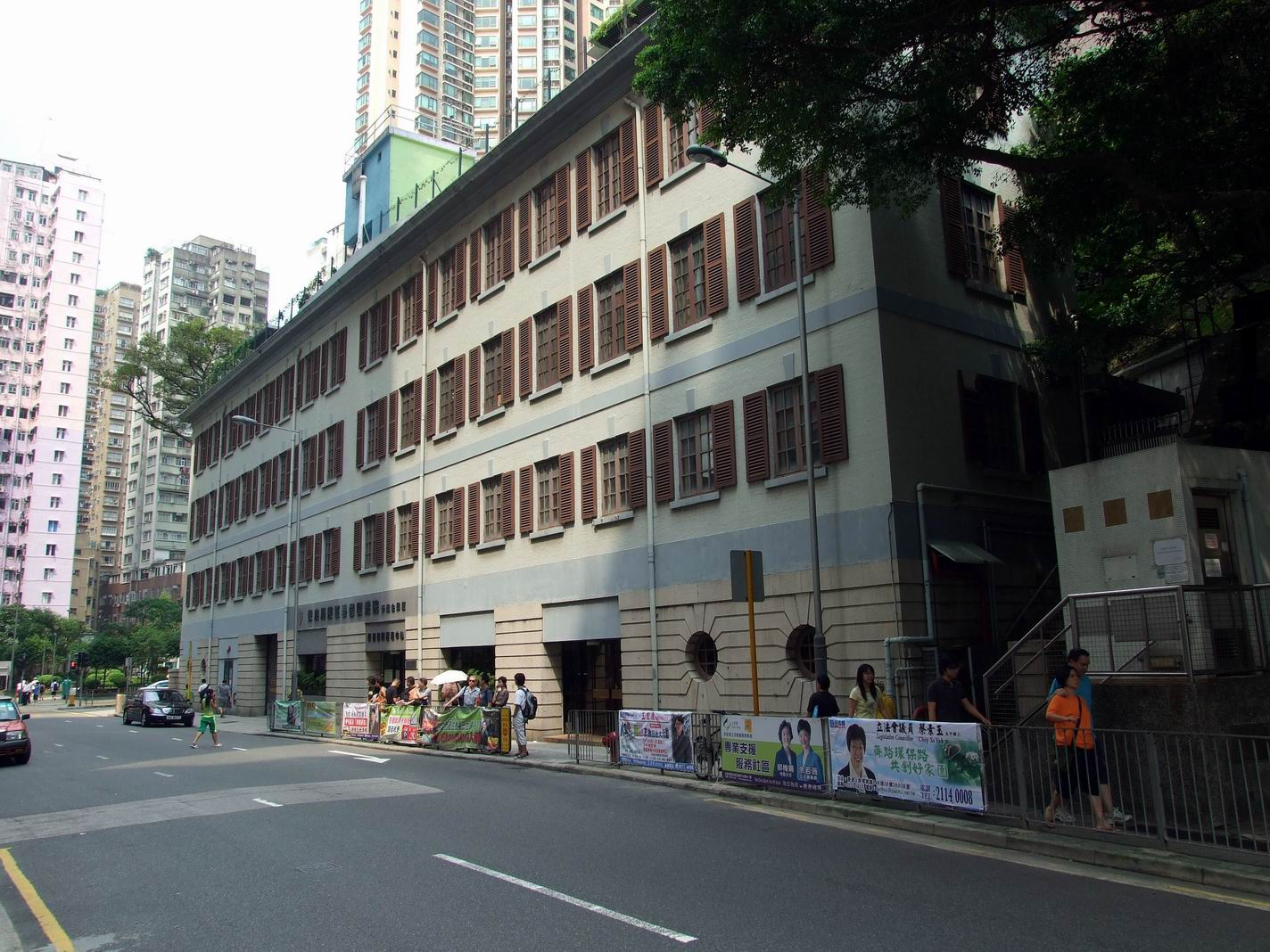
Ex-Western Fire Station, at No. 12 Belcher's Street.

The former Western Fire Station, located at No. 12 Belcher's Street, was converted into the Po Leung Kuk Chan Au Big Yan Home for the Elderly. It is a Grade III historic building and is located along the Central and Western Heritage Trail.

== See also ==
- List of streets and roads in Hong Kong
- Belcher Bay
- The Belcher's
- HKU station a station of the MTR, with one exit in Belcher's Street
