= The Belcher's =

Housing estate in Shek Tong Tsui, Hong Kong

Coordinates: 22°17′08″N 114°08′01″E

- 寶翠園
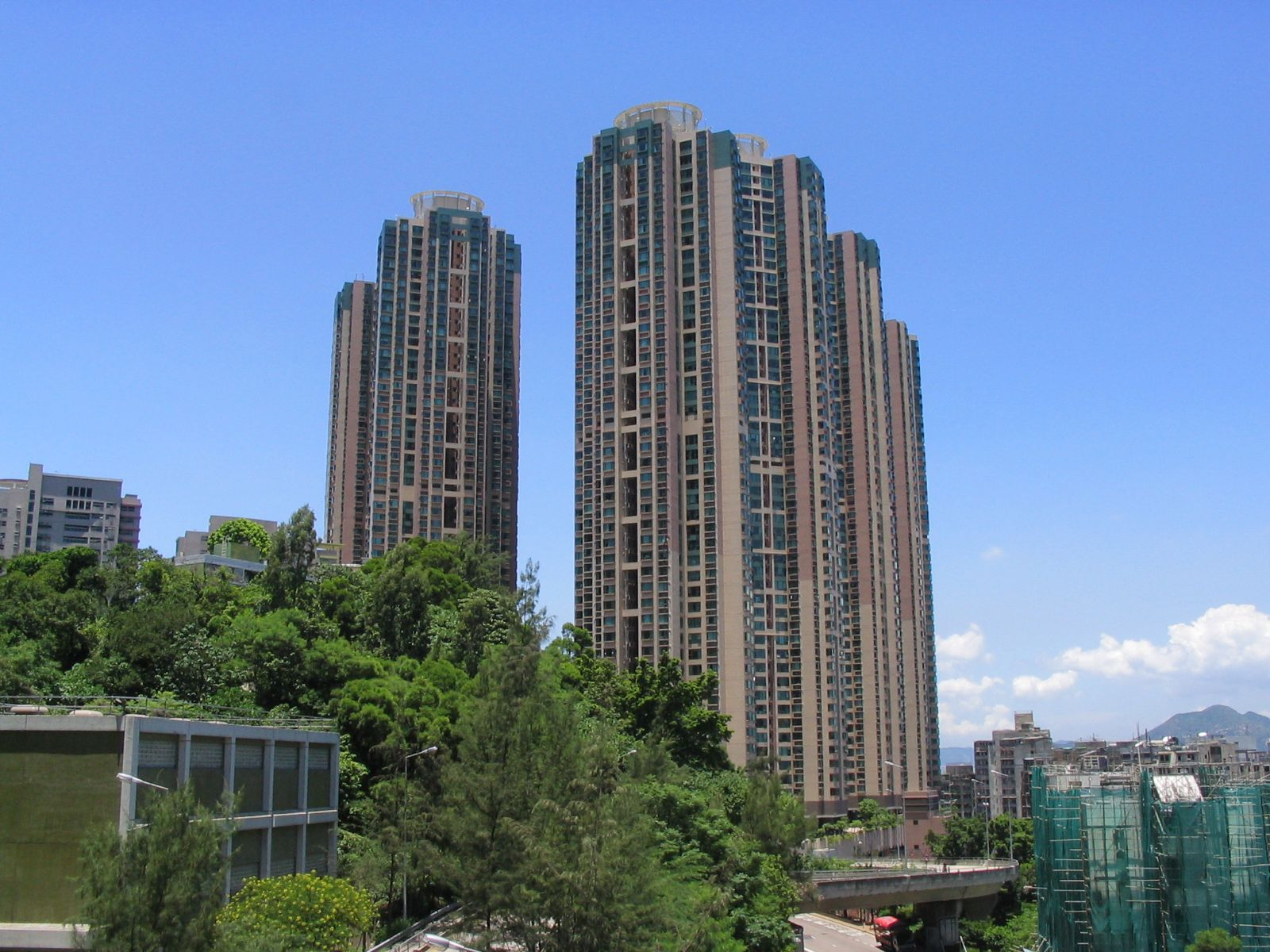
- The Belcher's
- Interactive map of the The Belcher's area

General information
- Type: Residential, retail
- Location: 89 Pok Fu Lam Road, Pok Fu Lam, Hong Kong
- Completed: 2001; 25 years ago

Height
- Roof: Towers 5 and 6: 227.0 metres (744.8 ft); Towers 1 and 2: 221.0 metres (725.1 ft); Towers 3 and 8: 214.0 metres (702.1 ft)

Technical details
- Floor count: Towers 5 and 6: 63; Towers 1 and 2: 61; Towers 3 and 8: 59
- Floor area: 271,453 m^{2} (2,921,900 sq ft)

Design and construction
- Architects: Simon Kwan & Associates Ltd. Steve Leung Designers Ltd.
- Developer: Shun Tak Holdings Ltd. Sun Hung Kai Properties Ltd. New World Development Co. Ltd. Liu Chong Hing Investment Ltd.
- Main contractor: Chun Fai-Hip Hing JV Ltd.

The Belcher's (Chinese: 寶翠園; Jyutping: bou^{2} ceoi^{3} jyun^{4}) is a private residential estate in Shek Tong Tsui, Hong Kong Island. It consists of six residential buildings constructed in two phases; three buildings were constructed in each phase. Construction for the first phase was completed in 2000, and in 2001 for the second phase. The estate was named after the adjacent Belcher's Street, which in turned was named after Sir Edward Belcher, a Canadian-born British naval officer and explorer.

The Belcher's is connected to the Westwood shopping centre.

== Features ==
Towers 5 and 6 have 63 floors; Towers 1 and 2 have 61 floors; and Towers 3 and 8 have 59 floors. The development's facilities include, amongst other things, carparks, swimming pools, and a shopping mall, The Westwood.

It is located at 89 Pok Fu Lam Road and close to a number of schools and the University of Hong Kong. The Belcher's links to a transportation network including the HKU station on the Island line.

As of 11 December 2011, two of the buildings are at 227 metres (745 feet) tall the 28th and 29th tallest buildings in Hong Kong. Another two buildings, at 221 metres (725 feet) tall, rank as the 30th and 31st tallest buildings in Hong Kong. The last two buildings, at 214 metres (702 feet) tall, are the 38th and 39th tallest buildings in Hong Kong.

== Demographics ==
In the 2016 by-census, the population of the estate was recorded as 6,908. The median age of the residents was 39.2.

== In popular culture ==
The Belcher's serves as the Headquarters of The Sharps Clan in Test Drive Unlimited Solar Crown.

== See also ==
- Belcher (constituency), Central and Western District Council constituency based on the area
- List of tallest buildings in Hong Kong
- HKU station a station of the MTR, serving The Belcher's
