= Hill Road, Hong Kong =

Street in Hong Kong

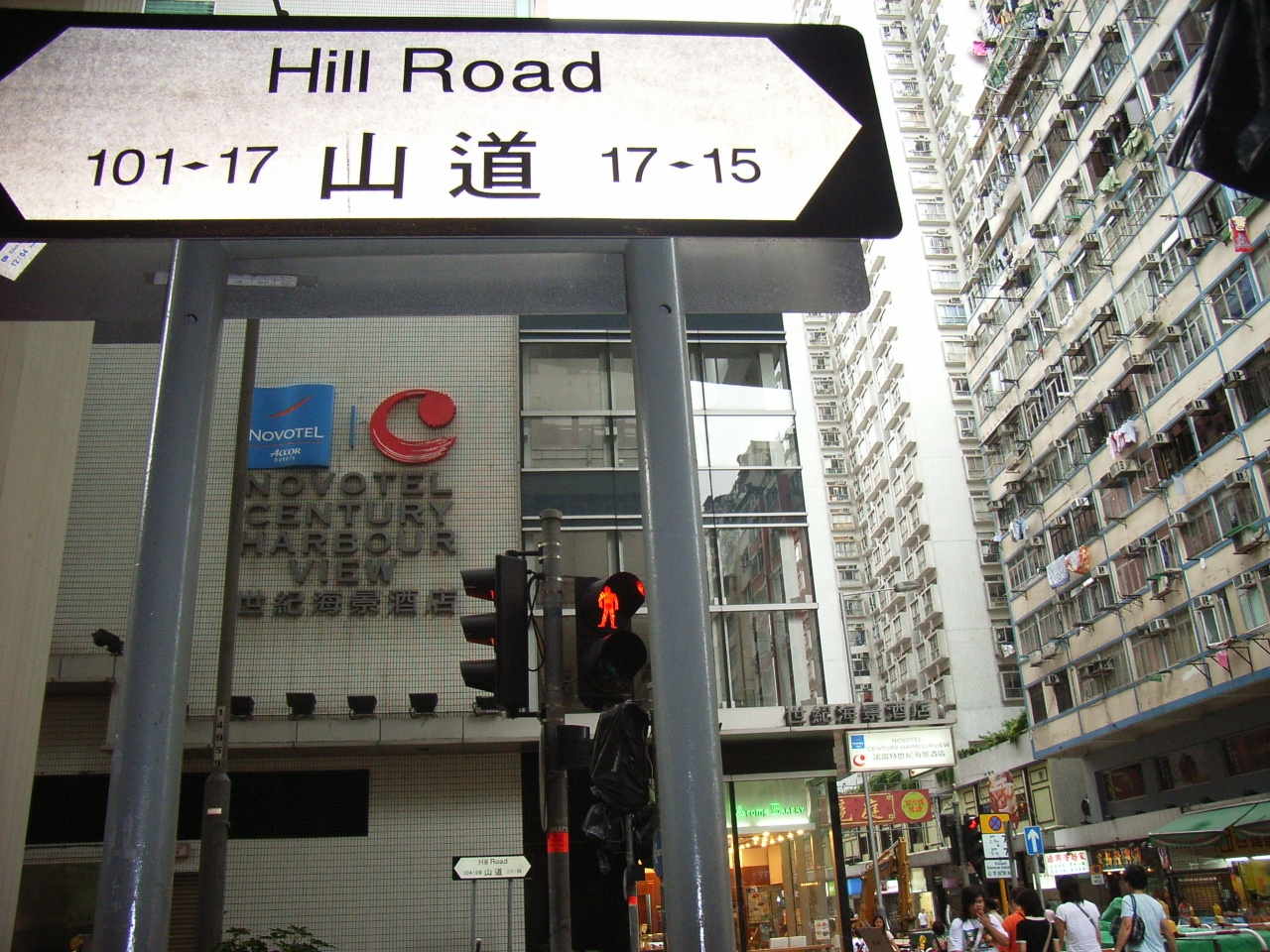
Hill Road

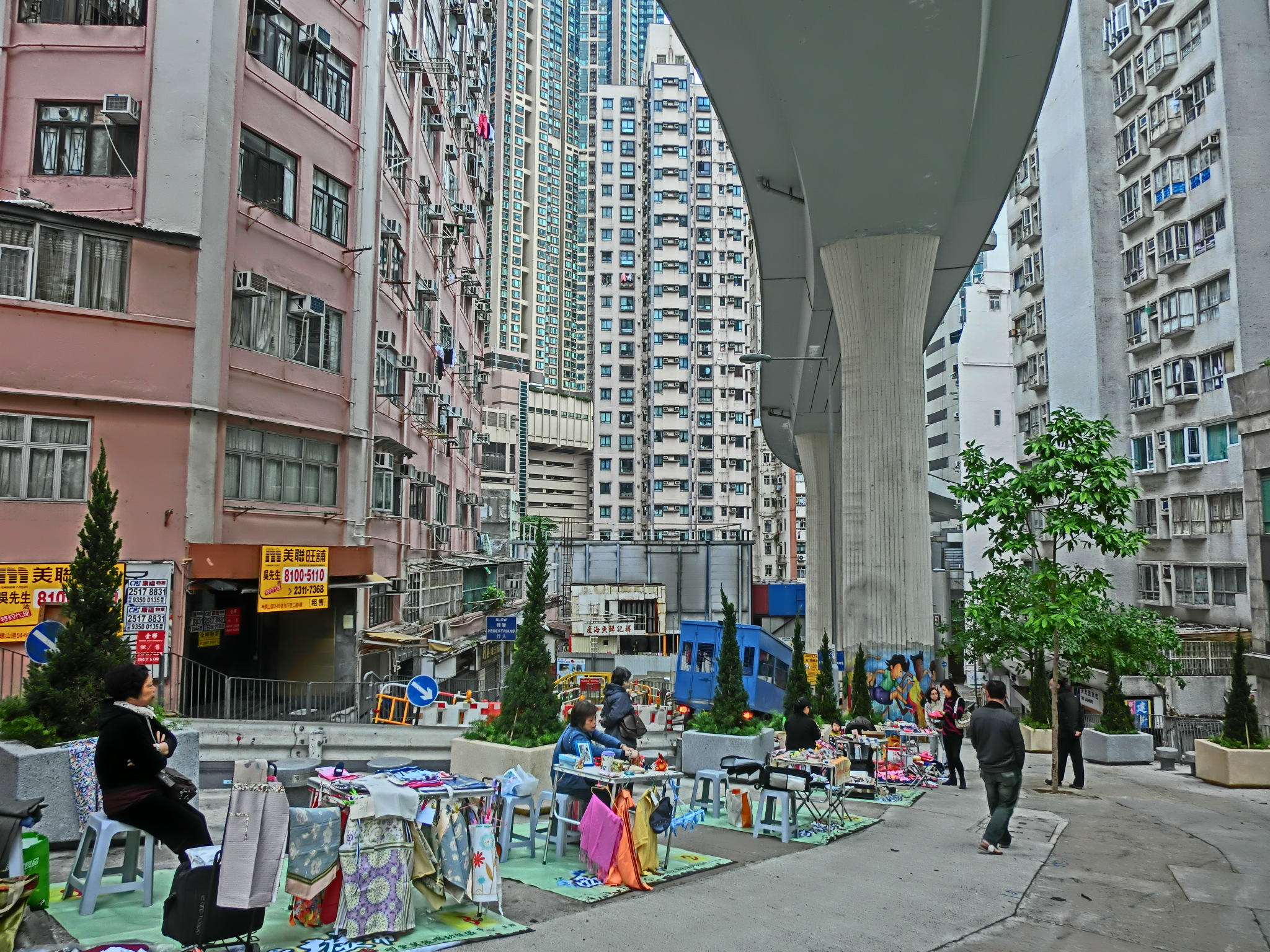
Western Flea Market and Hill Road Flyover

Hill Road (Chinese: 山道) is a road in Shek Tong Tsui, Hong Kong Island, Hong Kong.

Hill Road Flyover, an unusually tall elevated road opened on 18 August 1981, stretches above the large part of Hill Road.

== See also ==
- List of streets and roads in Hong Kong
