= West End path (Hong Kong) =

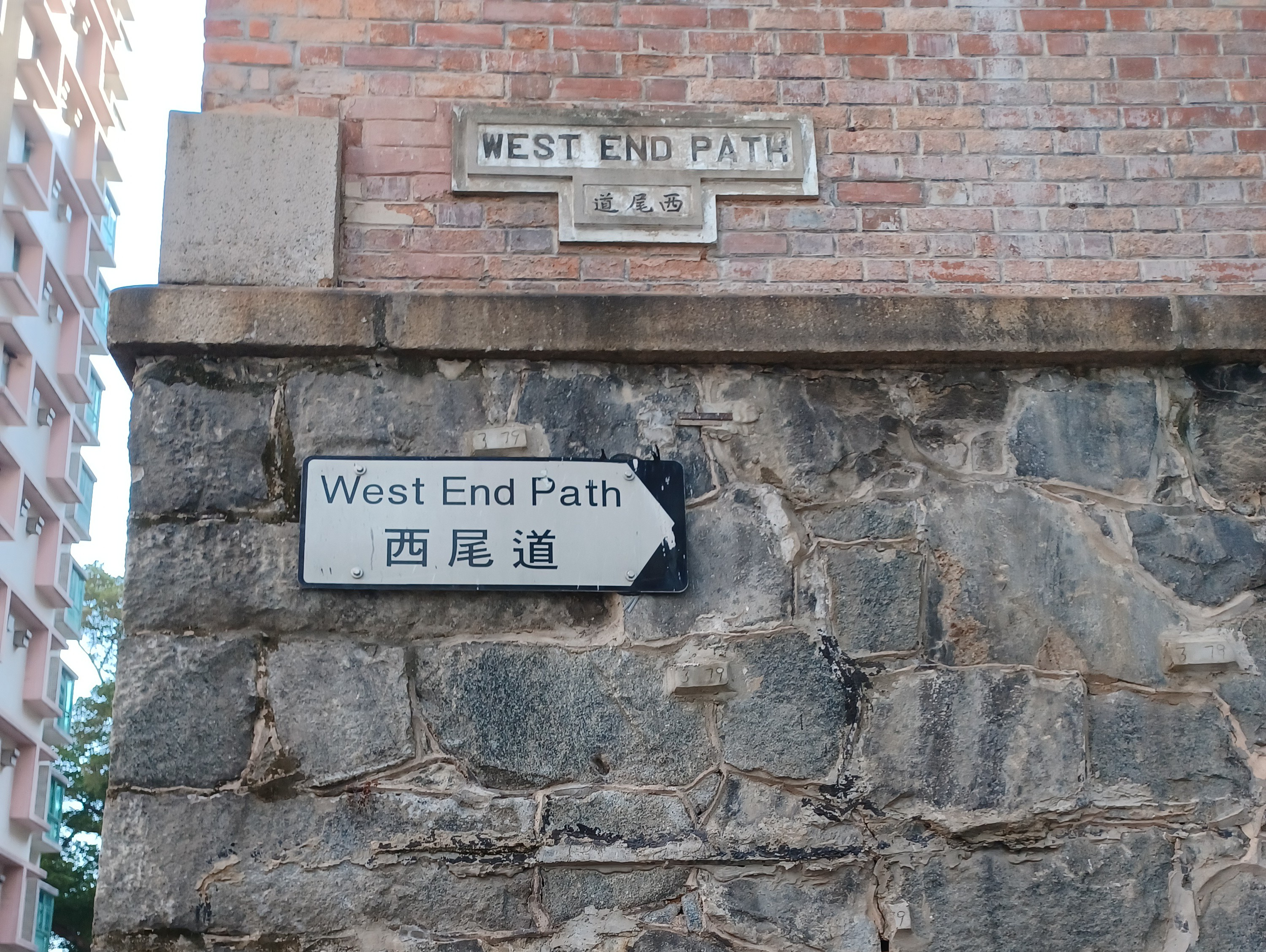
Street Sign of West End Path on the exterior wall of the former Victoria Chinese Psychiatric Hospital

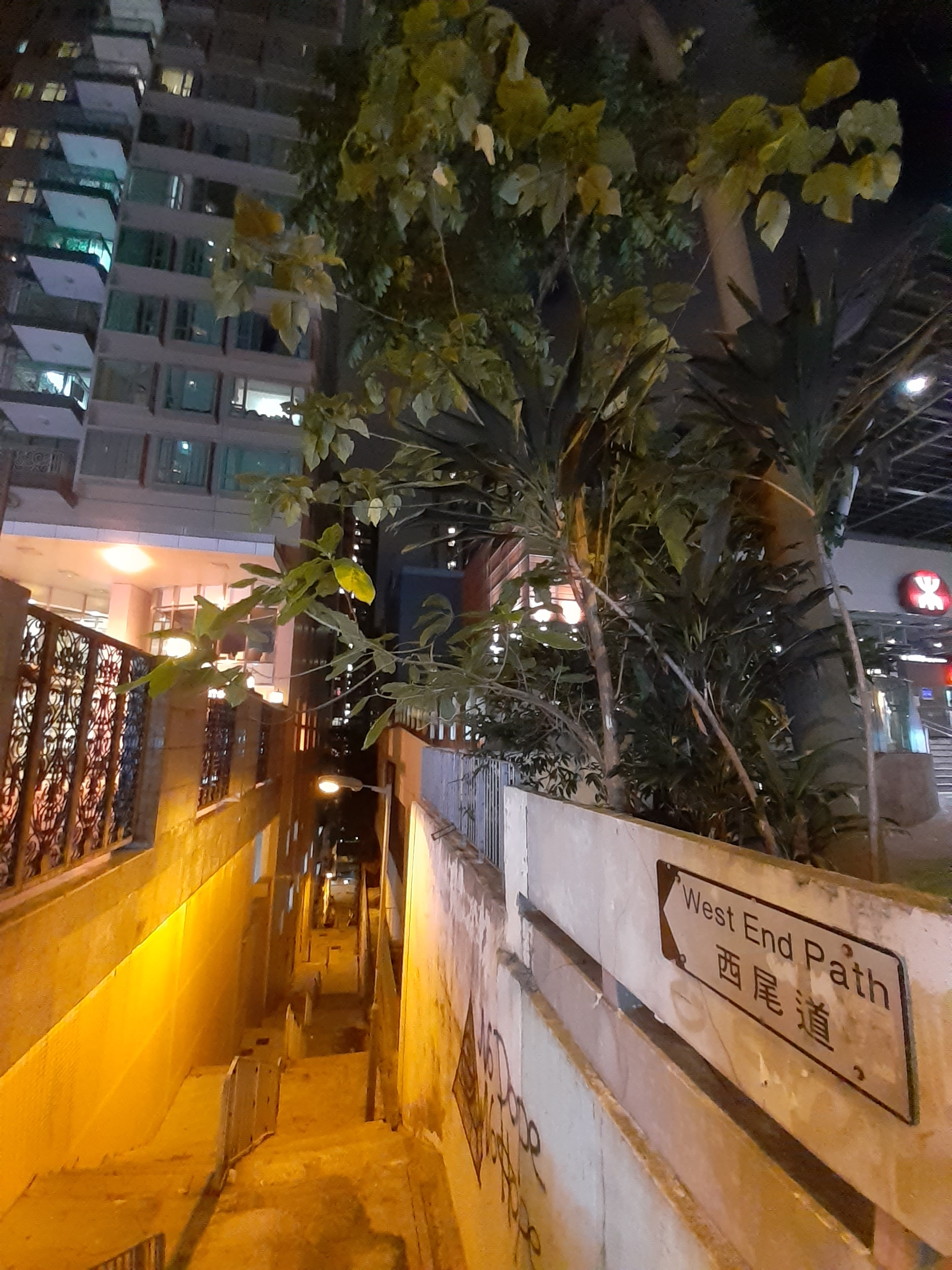
West End Path

West End Path (Chinese: 西尾道; Jyutping: sai1 mei5 dou6) is a footway located in Sai Ying Pun, Central and Western District, Hong Kong Island. It starts from High Street near Eastern Street in the north, and ends between Bon-point (雍慧閣), No. 11 Bonham Road, Sai Ying Pun MTR Station in the south.

== History ==
In the Sai Ying Pun area of Hong Kong Island, the former Chinese settlements were roughly developed on both sides of Centre Street (正街). The east and west ends of the settlement boundary are called East Street and West Street respectively. From the bottom of the mountain to the middle of the mountain, the settlement extended from Queen's Road West, First Street, Second Street, and Third Street to High Street (formerly Fourth Street). These streets roughly outlined the south and north boundaries of the settlement at that time.

Meanwhile, the wealthy westerners' settlement was in the Mid-levels area, stretching from Park Road and Lyttelton Road, mainly centered around the east side of West End Park (城西公園). Bonham Road, which sits between the Chinese and westerners settlements, was a residential area, which used to serve as the boundary between the Chinese and the well-off westerners at the time, it slowly became a settlement for some Chinese as their wealth increased. The West End Path has all along been a footway that connects Bonham Street and High Street with a stairway. There used to be a residential area therein called West End Terrace (西尾臺) with High Street and Bonham Street as its entry. The Terrace was later demolished when it was acquired by a real estate developer for the development of Bon-point on Banham Road.
