= Water Street, Hong Kong =

Street in Sai Ying Pun, Hong Kong

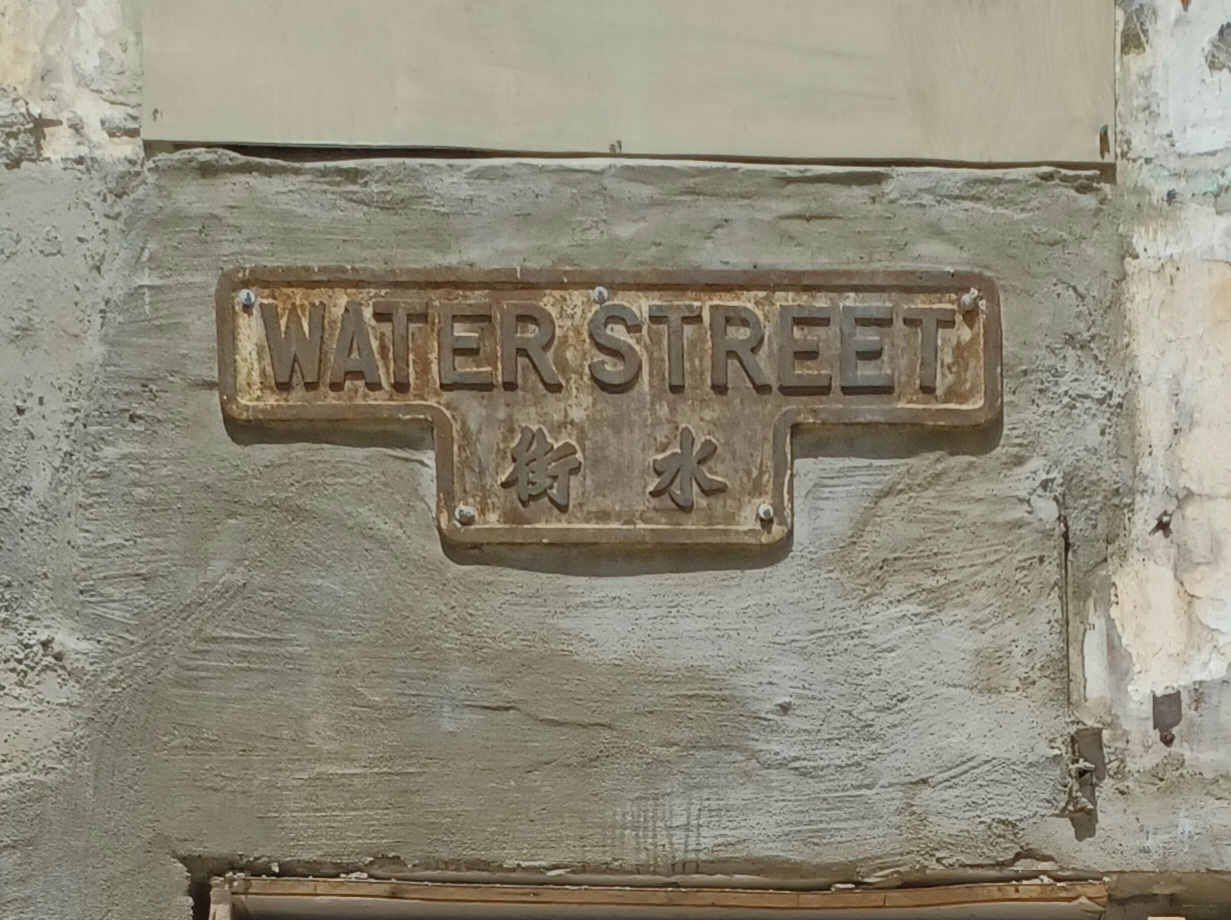
Antique cast-iron street nameplate.

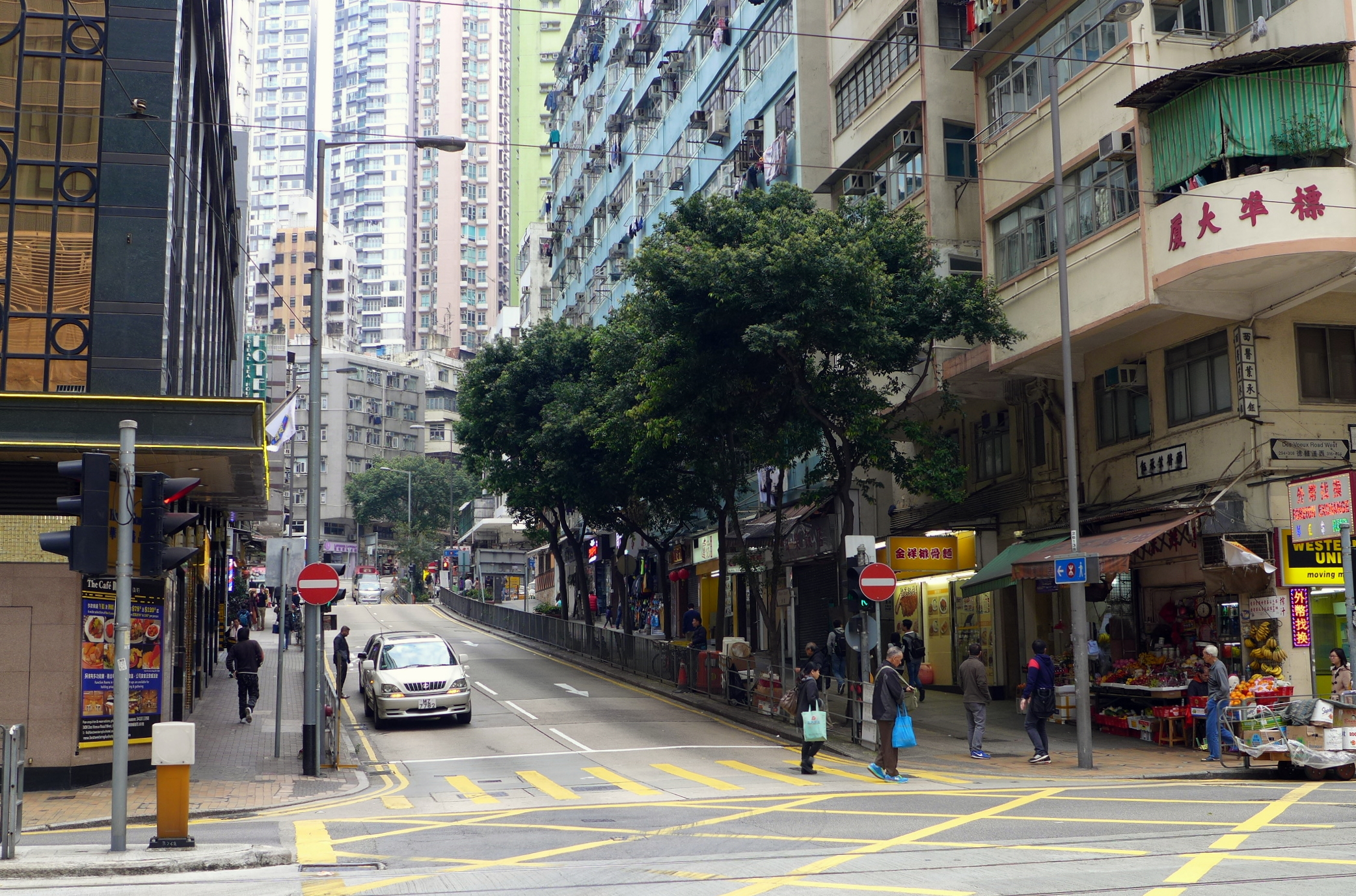
Intersection of Water Street and Des Voeux Road West in Sai Ying Pun.

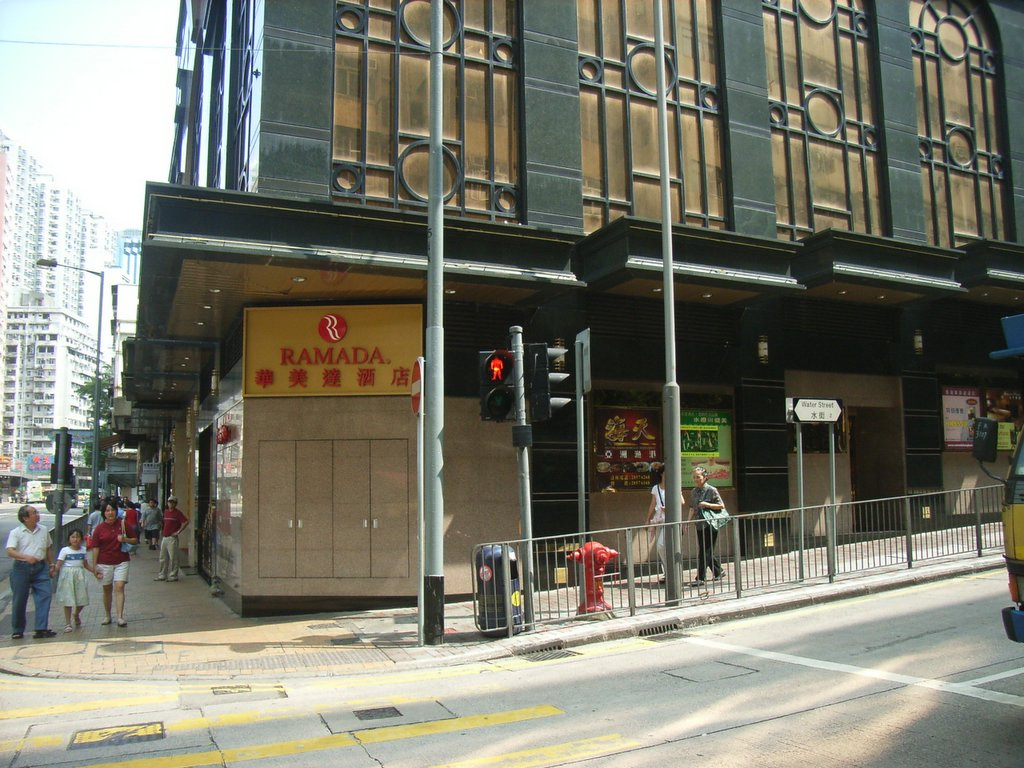
The Ramada Hotel on the corner of Water Street and Des Voeux Road West.

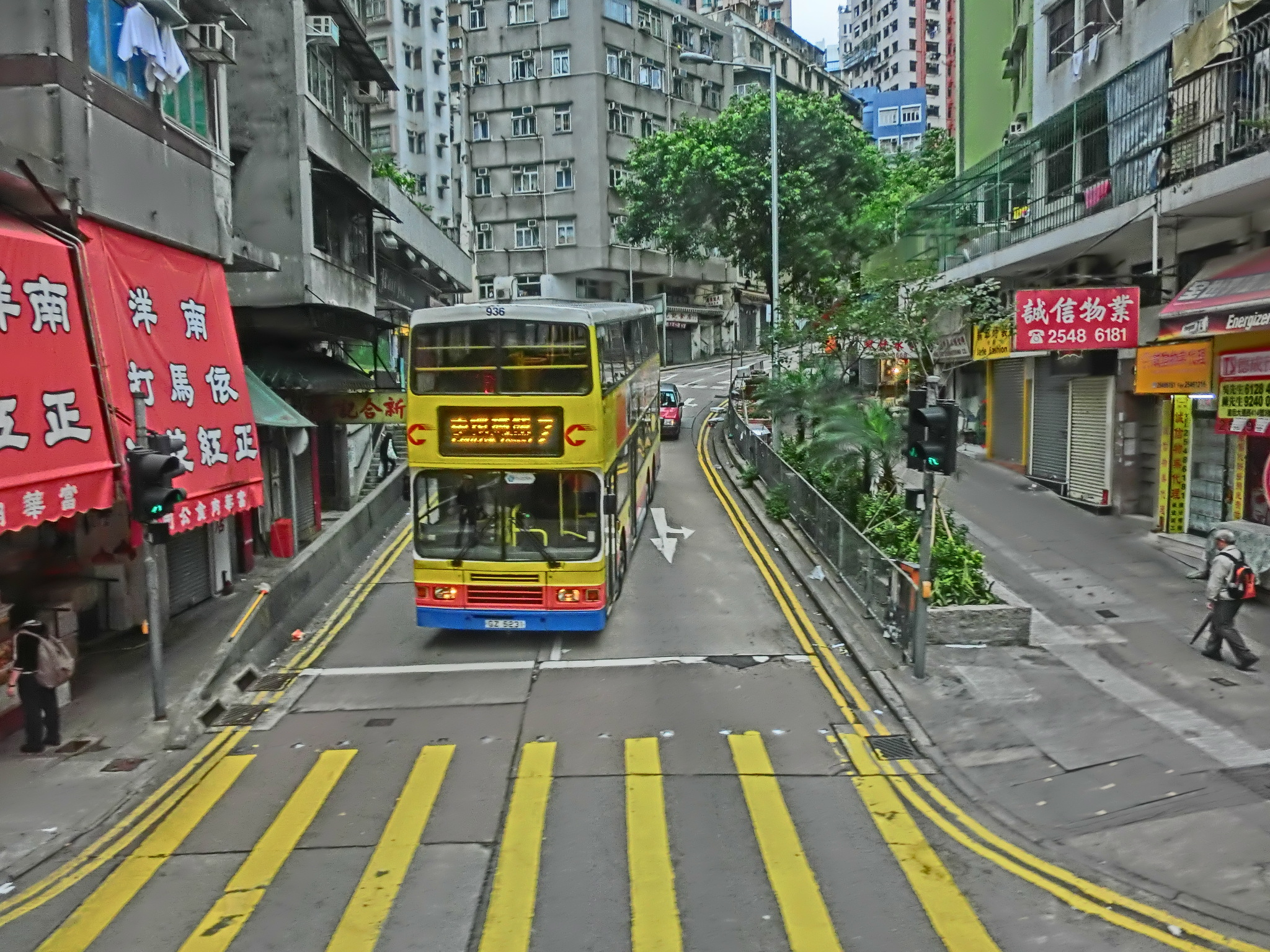
Water Street facing south from the junction with Queen's Road West.

Water Street (Chinese: 水街; Jyutping: seoi2 gaai1) is a street in Sai Ying Pun, Hong Kong. It runs from Connaught Road, crossing Des Voeux Road West and Queen's Road West whereupon it climbs steeply uphill, crossing Second Street and Third Street, before ending as a ladder street at the junction of High Street and Pok Fu Lam Road.

== History ==
Water Street is named for a nullah which originally ran down the middle of the street, carrying spring water from Victoria Peak down to Victoria Harbour. The nullah was later covered, and the road became a pedestrian thoroughfare frequented by hot food hawkers. The hawkers remained a regular fixture even after the street was opened to traffic, but disappeared after the government ceased issuing permits, and initiated a crackdown on unlicensed hawkers.

== Features ==
There are 228 retail units across 8 buildings with addresses in Water Street. Most buildings on the street have their addresses in the intersecting streets.

== Constituency ==
An electoral constituency in the Central and Western District Council is named after Water Street. The boundaries of this constituency follow Bonham Road, Hill Road, Queen's Road West, and Western Street. On 24 November 2003, the constituents elected Tai Cheuk Yin Leslie Spencer. 2,581 valid votes were cast. The estimated population of the constituency was 14,687 on 30 June 2003.

== See also ==
- List of streets and roads in Hong Kong
- Water Street (constituency)
