= Centre Street, Hong Kong =

Street in Sai Ying Pun, Hong Kong

Coordinates: 22.28630°N 114.14225°E

- Traditional Chinese: 正街
Transcriptions
Yue: Cantonese
- Yale Romanization: Ying gāai
- Jyutping: Jing3 gaai1

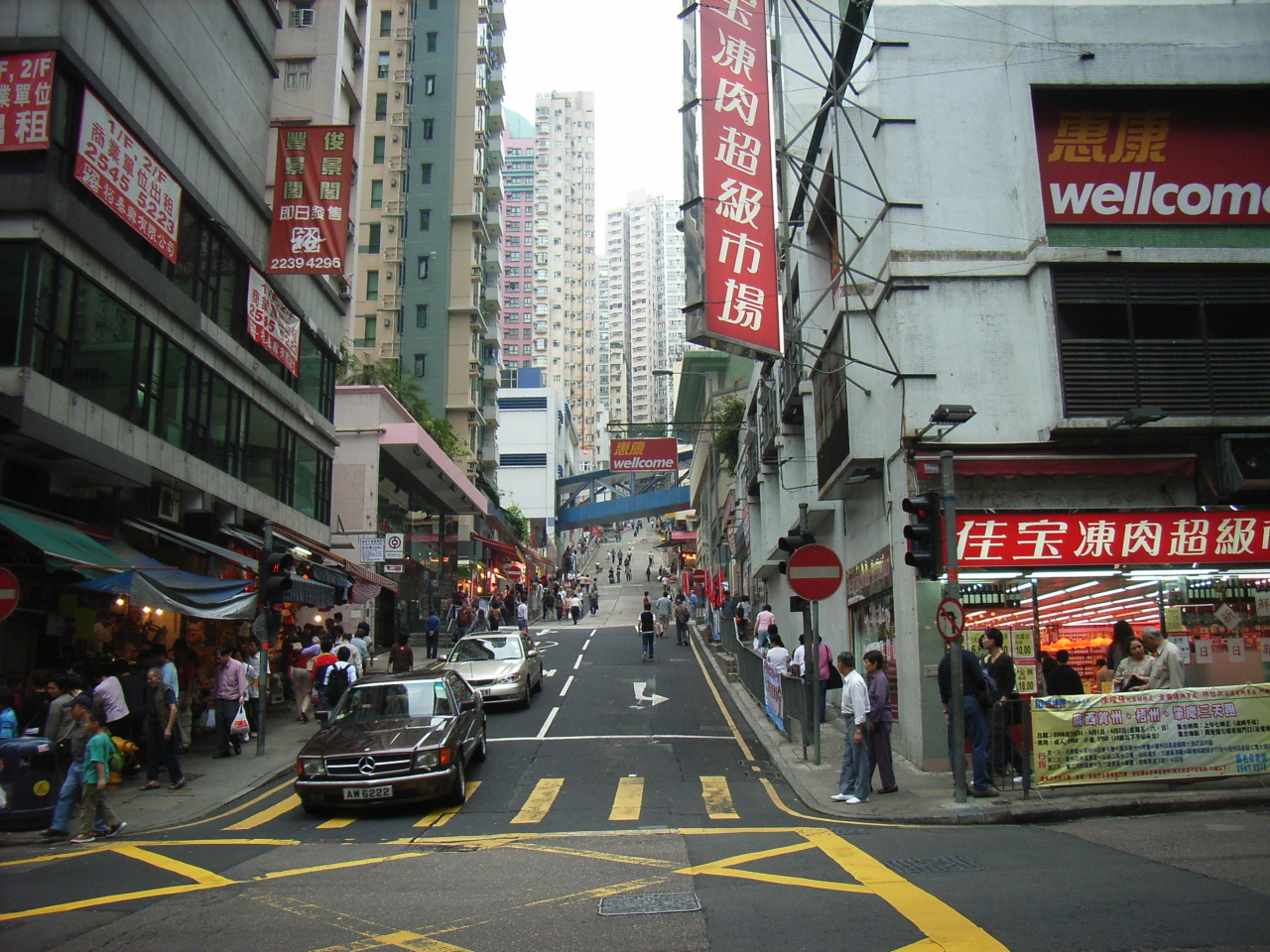
Centre Street, in Sai Ying Pun, Hong Kong, at its intersection with Queen's Road West in April 2006.

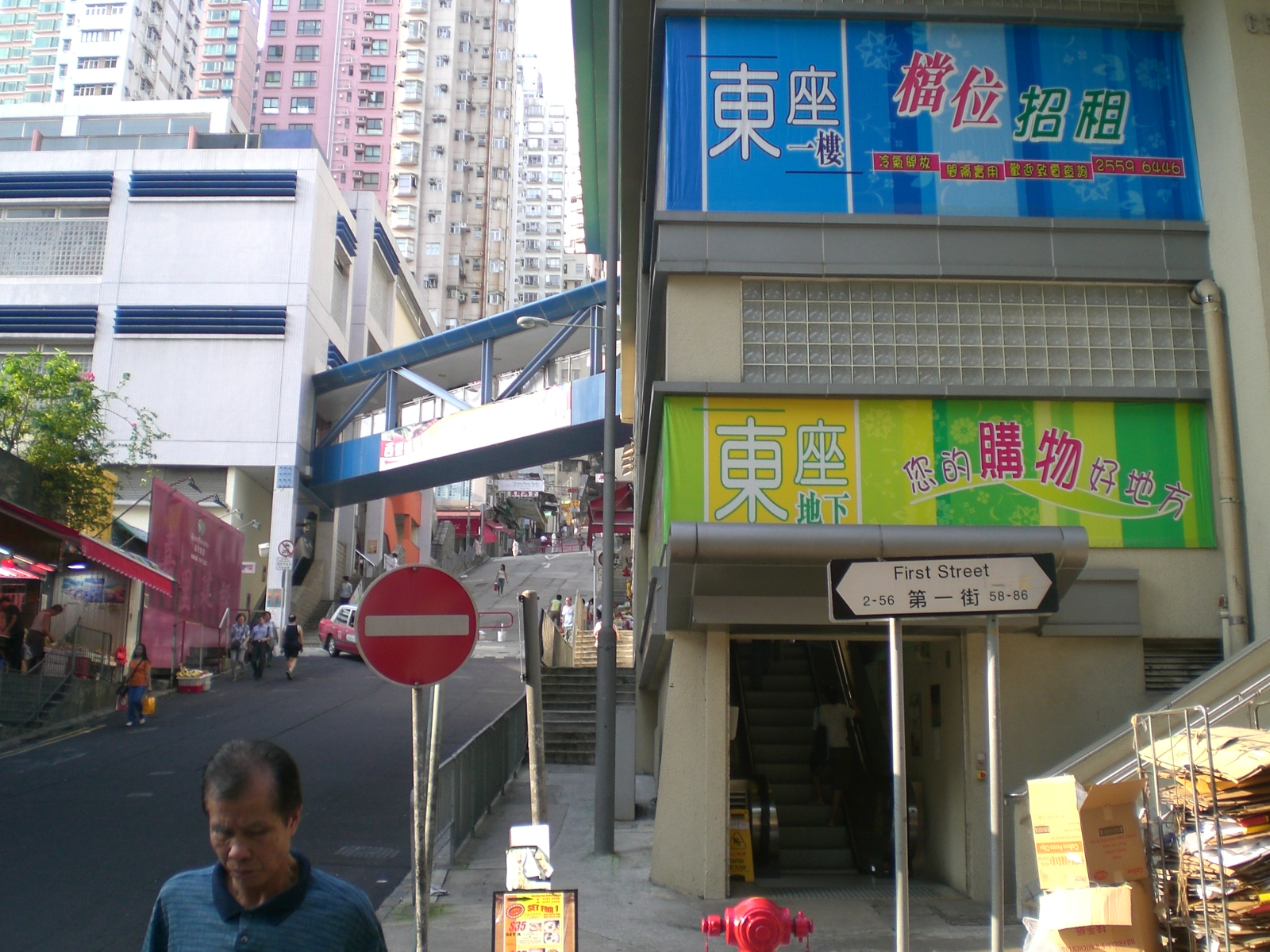
View of Centre Street at its intersection with First Street in August 2007, looking north, with Sai Ying Pun Market (left) and Centre Street Market (right).

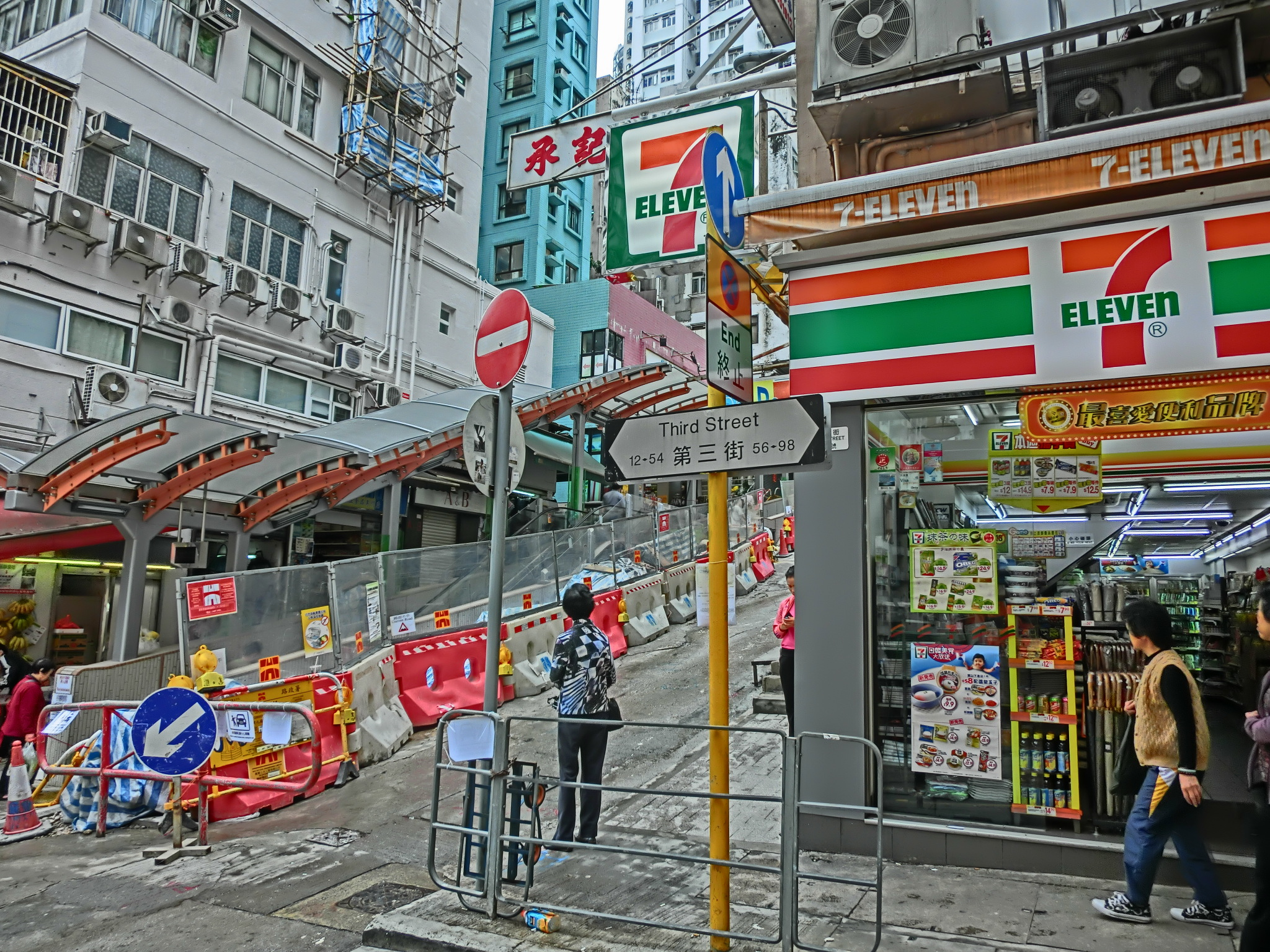
Section of Centre Street Escalator Link, between Third Street and High Street, under construction in March 2013.

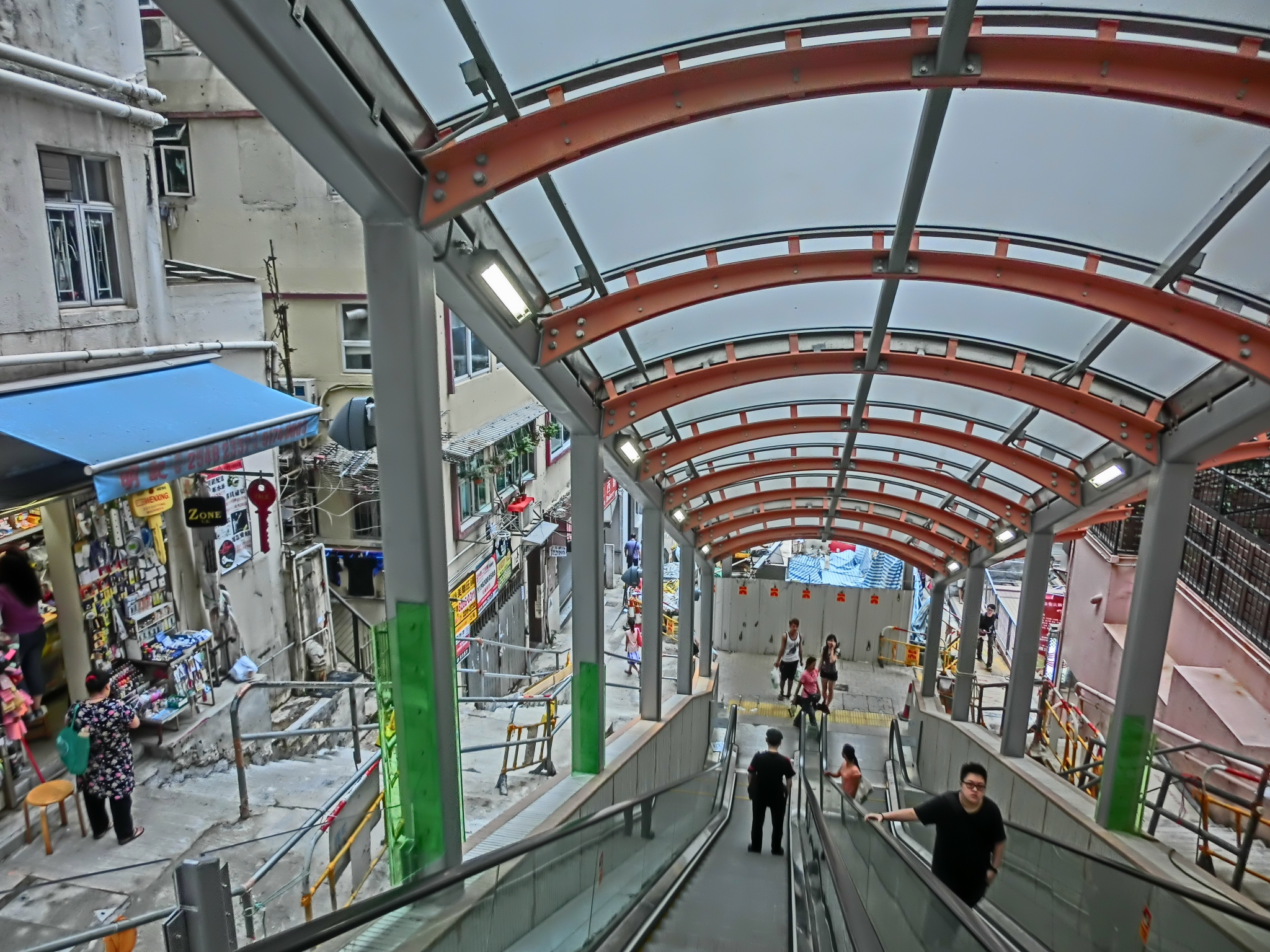
Centre Street Escalator Link, in the upper section of Centre Street, between High Street and Bonham Road, in May 2013.

Centre Street (Chinese: 正街; Jyutping: zing3 gaai1) is a street in the Sai Ying Pun area of Hong Kong. It is the focal point of the most active traditional market in the Western District of Hong Kong Island. The street was amongst the first to have been planned during early development of the area.

With a 1:4 gradient, Centre Street is one of the steepest roads in Hong Kong, earning it the nickname Long Life Slope. It is used by approximately 10,000 pedestrians per day.

The section north of Queen's Road West and south of Victoria Harbour is a flat road that was originally reclaimed from the sea.

== Location ==
Centre Street runs north to south from Connaught Road, crossing Des Voeux Road West and Queen's Road West before climbing steeply up the hill where it crosses First Street, Second Street, Third Street, and High Street. Centre Street terminates at the top of a long escalator which connects it to Bonham Road. Western Street and Eastern Street run parallel to Centre Street.

== Facilities ==
From north to south:

- Centre Street Market, between First Street and Second Street
- Sai Ying Pun Market, between Second Street and Third Street
- A small park with seats is located between Second Street and Third Street
- Centre Street Escalator Link, between Third Street and Bonham Road

== Side lanes ==
Lanes off Centre Street include Ying Wa Terrace, Cheung On Lane, Yu Lok Lane, and David Lane (home of the Yu Kwan Yick chilli sauce factory). These lanes are only accessible to pedestrians, and contain stairs.

== Transport ==
Traffic conditions vary along the length of the street, with the section between High Street and Second Street closed-off to vehicles. The uppermost part is two-way traffic to the stairs, and the lowermost part is one-way to Connaught Road West where vehicles can turn left or right.

Green Public Light Bus route 12 has a terminus on the lower part of the street, whilst bus route 5S has a morning run starting from there.

A series of escalators run uphill in the Centre Street Market and the Sai Ying Pun Market buildings, carrying pedestrians from First to Third Street. The Centre Street Escalator Link then takes pedestrians all the way to the top of the street to Bonham Road. Construction of the escalator cost $60,000,000 HKD and it was officially opened in April 2013.

Sai Ying Pun station opened on 29 March 2015, with a station entrance just behind the Centre Street Market.

== Constituency ==
A former electoral constituency in the Central and Western District Council was named after Centre Street. Its boundaries followed Eastern Street, Queen's Road West, Eastern Street, High Street, and Bonham Road. The polling station was located in the Kau Yan Church and school in High Street. On 11 June 2006, a by-election elected Sidney Lee Chi Hang (李志恆). The boundaries for the 2007 election were extended to include block bounded by Des Voeux Road West, Centre Street, and Eastern Street. In 2006, the constituency had 6,168 registered voters.

== See also ==
- Central–Mid-Levels escalator
- List of streets and roads in Hong Kong
- Transport in Hong Kong
