= First Street, Hong Kong =

Street in Sai Ying Pun, Hong Kong

First Street (Chinese: 第一街; Jyutping: dai6 jat1 gaai1) is a street in Sai Ying Pun, an early suburb of Hong Kong.

The street is part of the planned layout of the early development. High Street, Third Street, Second Street and First Street run east to west horizontally on a slope while Centre Street, Western Street and Eastern Street run north to south steeply.

First Street runs one way from Eastern Street, crossing Centre Street and Western Street to Pok Fu Lam Road in the west. It is about 250 metres long. The northern side of the street has odd numbers and is on the lower side of the slope.

== Transport ==
Vehicles can drive from east to west. Taxis frequent the street. Green mini bus route 45A has its terminus on the south side of the street between Centre and Western Streets. This bus runs up Western Street, Bonham Road, Lyttelton Road, Babington Path, Robinson Road, Kotewall Road to Conduit Road, and then returns the same way and then via Breezy Path, Hospital Road, Second Street and Centre Street. Paid half-hour parking and motorcycle parking is available towards the west end.

== Side lanes ==
Side lanes include Algar Court, going down to Queen's Road West, between Western and Centre Street. There is also an unnamed lane going down to Queen's Road West, between Centre and Eastern Streets. This gives access to a back lane running behind the buildings on First Street. This lane runs from Eastern to Centre Street, and is for foot traffic only. Businesses on these lanes include 2 Philippine products shops, an electrician, a metal folding shop, and a tea shop on the corner with Eastern Street.

== Buildings ==
Most buildings along this street are around 5 or 6 stories, but there are a few high rise apartment blocks of over 20 floors including the Shun Tai Building, Island Crest, Chun King Building, Charming Court, and the rear of Western Garden. Totally, there are 528 units in 60 buildings with First Street addresses.

== Businesses ==
In the First Street are many small businesses. The Western District Junior Police Call clubhouse is under the Western Garden building.

Larger enterprises include the Bank of China branch, a Wellcome supermarket, Government offices (Drainage, Labour and Social Welfare) in the Western Magistracy, the Agency for Volunteer Service Elderly Centre, Centre Street Market, including, the cooked food centre, public toilet, refuse collection point, and an escalator to Sai Ying Pun Market.

== See also ==
- List of streets and roads in Hong Kong
