= Old Tsan Yuk Maternity Hospital =

Former hospital in Hong Kong

Coordinates: 22.28592°N 114.14086°E

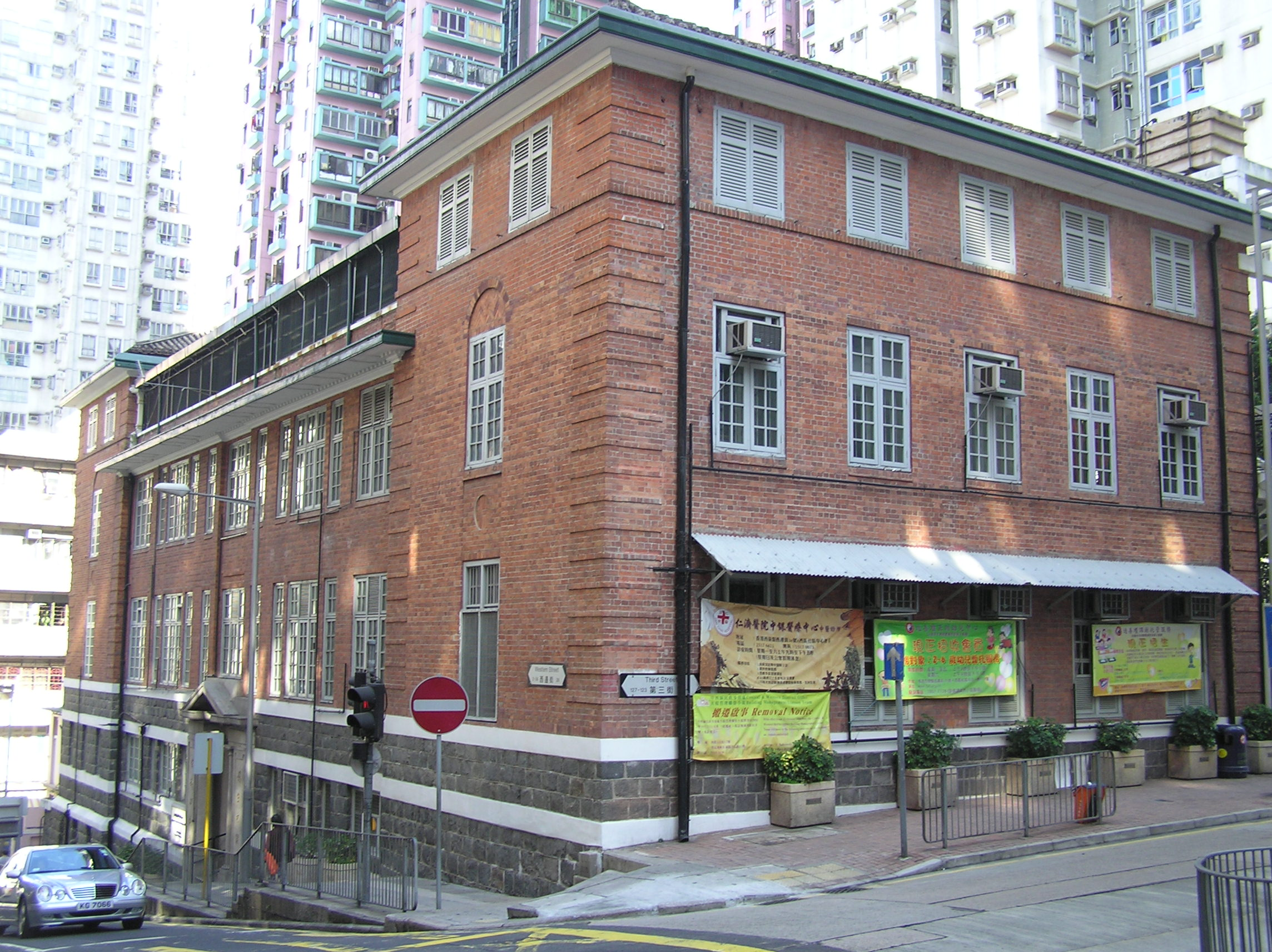
- Old Tsan Yuk Hospital, now Western District Community Centre
- Interactive map of the Old Tsan Yuk Maternity Hospital area
- Former names: Tsan Yuk Maternity Hospital

General information
- Architectural style: Georgian
- Location: 36A Western Street, Sai Ying Pun, Hong Kong Island, Hong Kong
- Current tenants: Western District Community Centre
- Completed: 17 October 1922; 103 years ago
- Cost: HK$ 94,000

Hong Kong Graded Building – Grade III
- Designated: 18 December 2009; 16 years ago
- Reference no.: 132

Old Tsan Yuk Maternity Hospital
- Traditional Chinese: 舊贊育醫院
- Simplified Chinese: 旧赞育医院
- Cantonese Yale: Gauh Jaanyuhk yīyún
Transcriptions
Standard Mandarin
- Hanyu Pinyin: Jiù Zànyù yīyuàn
- Wade–Giles: Chiu^{4} Tsan^{4}-yü^{4} i^{1}-yüen^{4}
- IPA: [tɕjôʊ tsân.ŷ í.ɥɛ̂n]
Yue: Cantonese
- Yale Romanization: Gauh Jaanyuhk yīyún
- Jyutping: gau6 zaan3 juk6 ji1 jyun2
- IPA: [kɐw˨ tsan˧.jʊk̚˨ ji˥.jyn˧˥]

Western District Community Centre
- Traditional Chinese: 西區社區中心
- Simplified Chinese: 西区社区中心
- Cantonese Yale: Sāikēui séhkēui jūngsām
Transcriptions
Standard Mandarin
- Hanyu Pinyin: Xīqū shèqū zhōngxīn
- Wade–Giles: Hsi^{1}-chü^{1} shê^{4}-chü^{1} chung^{1}-hsin^{1}
- IPA: [ɕí.tɕʰý ʂɤ̂.tɕʰý ʈʂʊ́ŋ.ɕín]
Yue: Cantonese
- Yale Romanization: Sāikēui séhkēui jūngsām
- Jyutping: sai1 koei1 se5 koei1 zung1 sam1
- IPA: [sɐj˥.kʰɵɥ˥ sɛ˩˧.kʰɵɥ˥ tsʊŋ˥.sɐm˥]

The Old Tsan Yuk Maternity Hospital is located at No. 36A Western Street, Sai Ying Pun, Hong Kong. It was founded in 1922 under the Chinese Public Dispensary Committee. After the war, Tsan Yuk Hospital has moved to Hospital Road and the site has become a multi-purpose community centre called Western District Community Centre.

Three-storeys high and 1,100 m^{2} (12,000 sq ft) in area, the British-colonial-style building comprises a three-storey hospital block with a basement, a two-storey staff quarters with annex and a one-storey servant quarters, all of which have now been converted into offices and function rooms for the community centre.

== History ==
Tsan Yuk Hospital was originally located at the cross-section of Western Street and Third Street in Hong Kong's Sai Ying Pun district. The land on which the hospital was built was donated by the government and the $94,000 construction fee was donated by Mr. H. M. H Nemazee, Sai Ying Pun Kai Fong Committee (西營盤街坊會) of the Fishmongers' Guild (魚販商會) and Fruit and Vegetable Sellers' Guild (蔬果販商協會). The thirty beds were donated by Tung Wah Hospital, another government hospital located in neighbouring Sheung Wan.

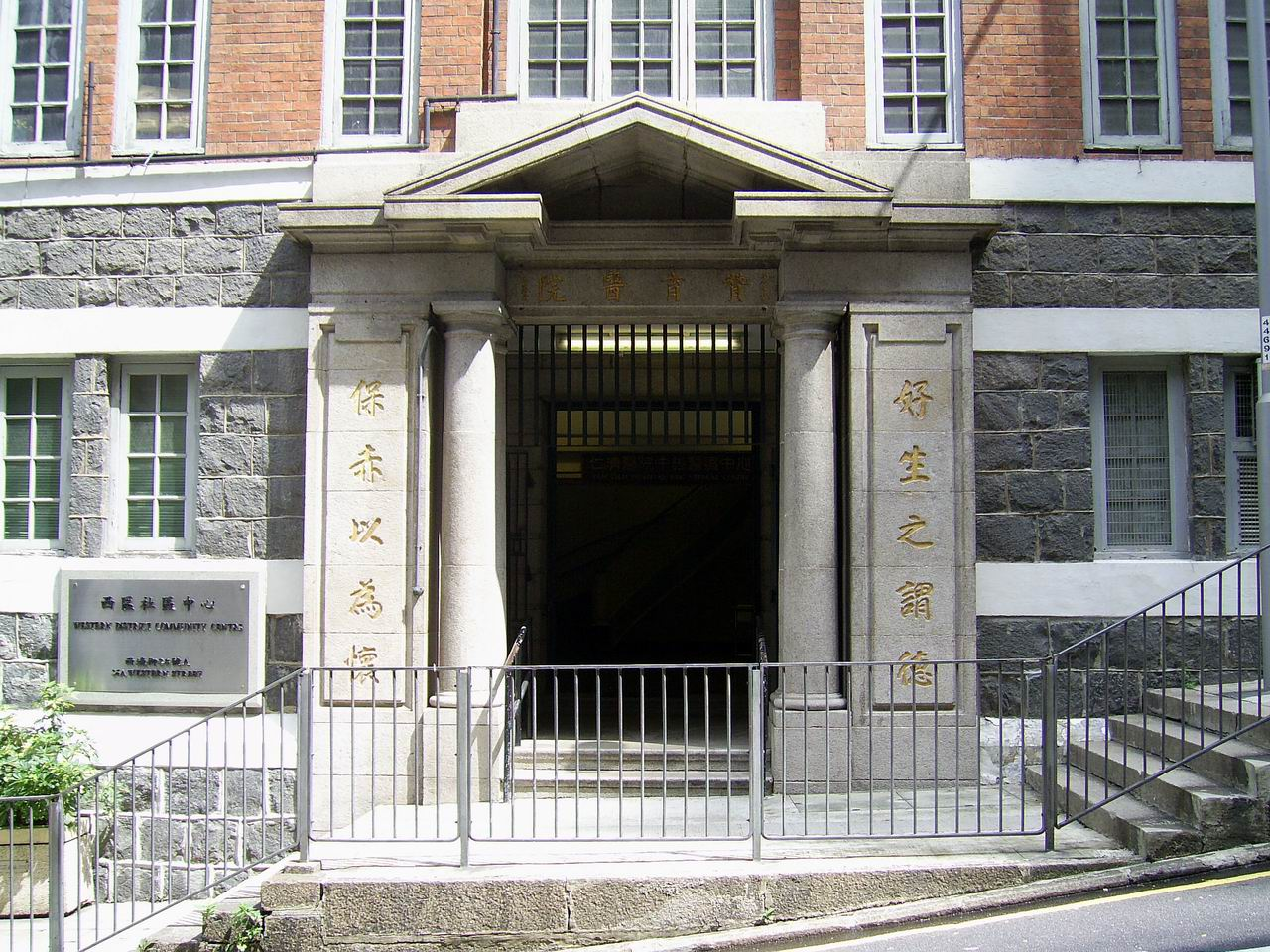
Old Tsan Yuk Hospital, Western District Community Centre's Main Entrance.

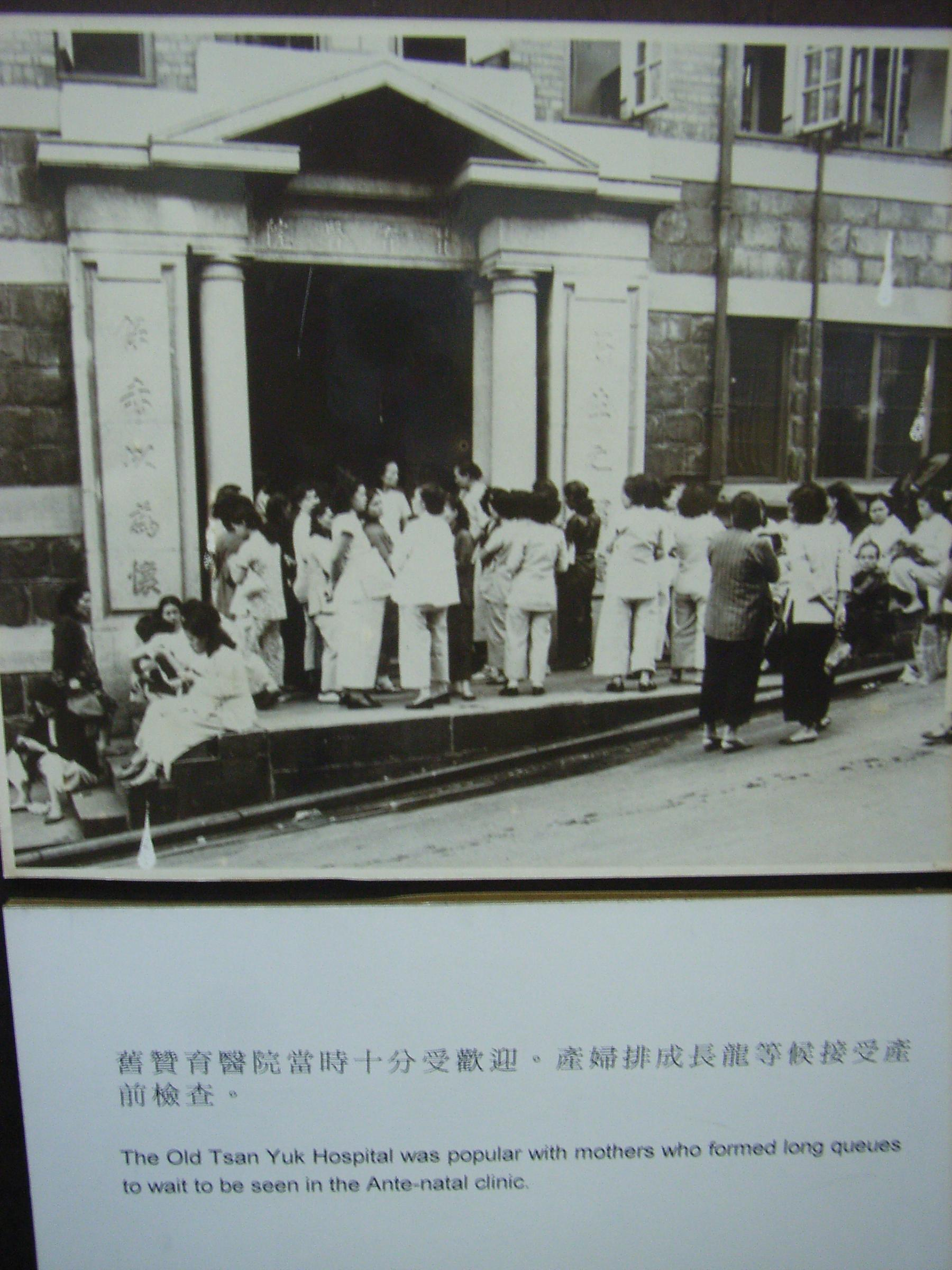
A picture showing people waiting outside Old Tsan Yuk Hospital.

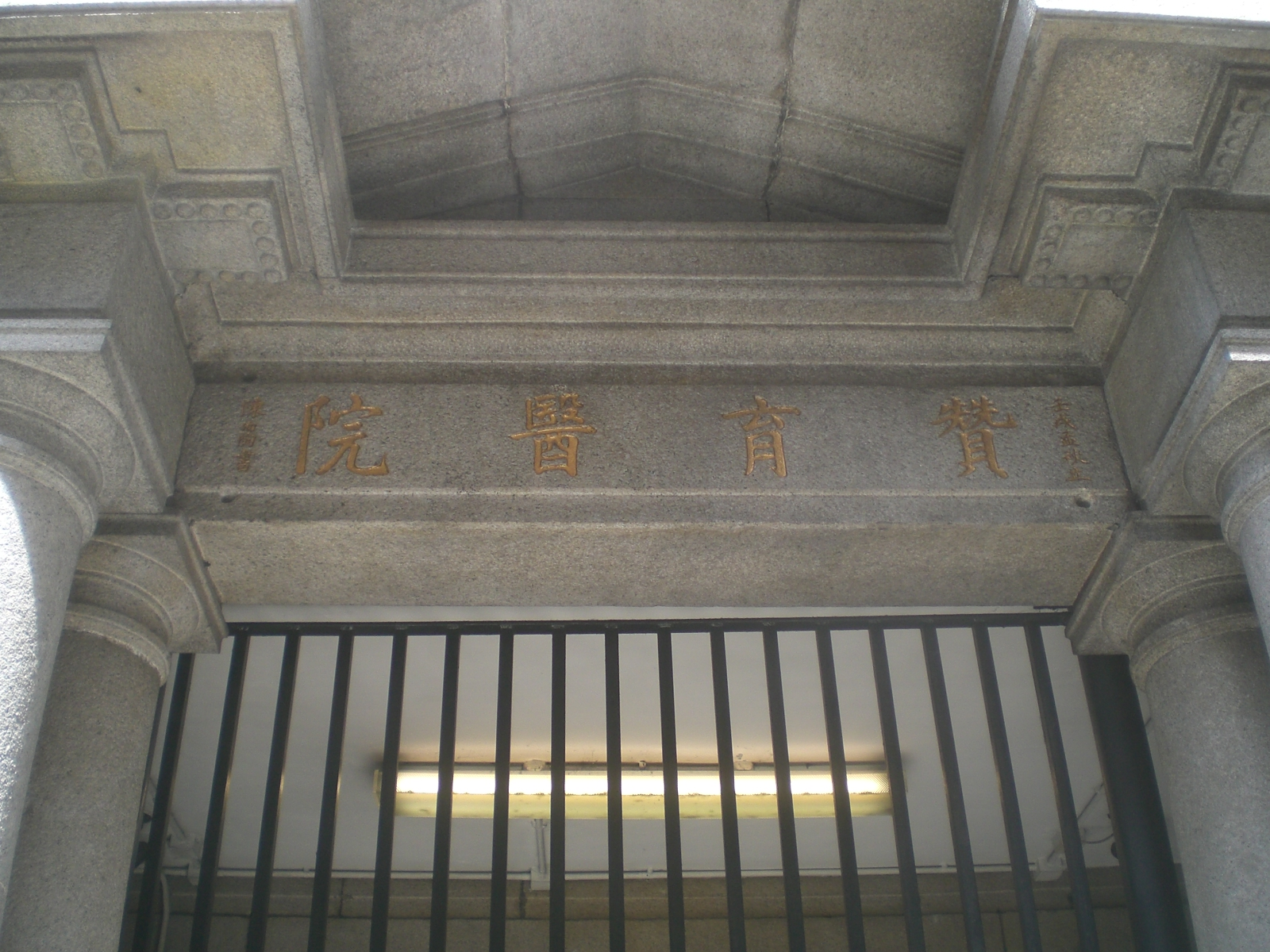
The building was renamed as Western District Community Centre, but the old Tsan Yuk Hospital Sign is still displayed there.

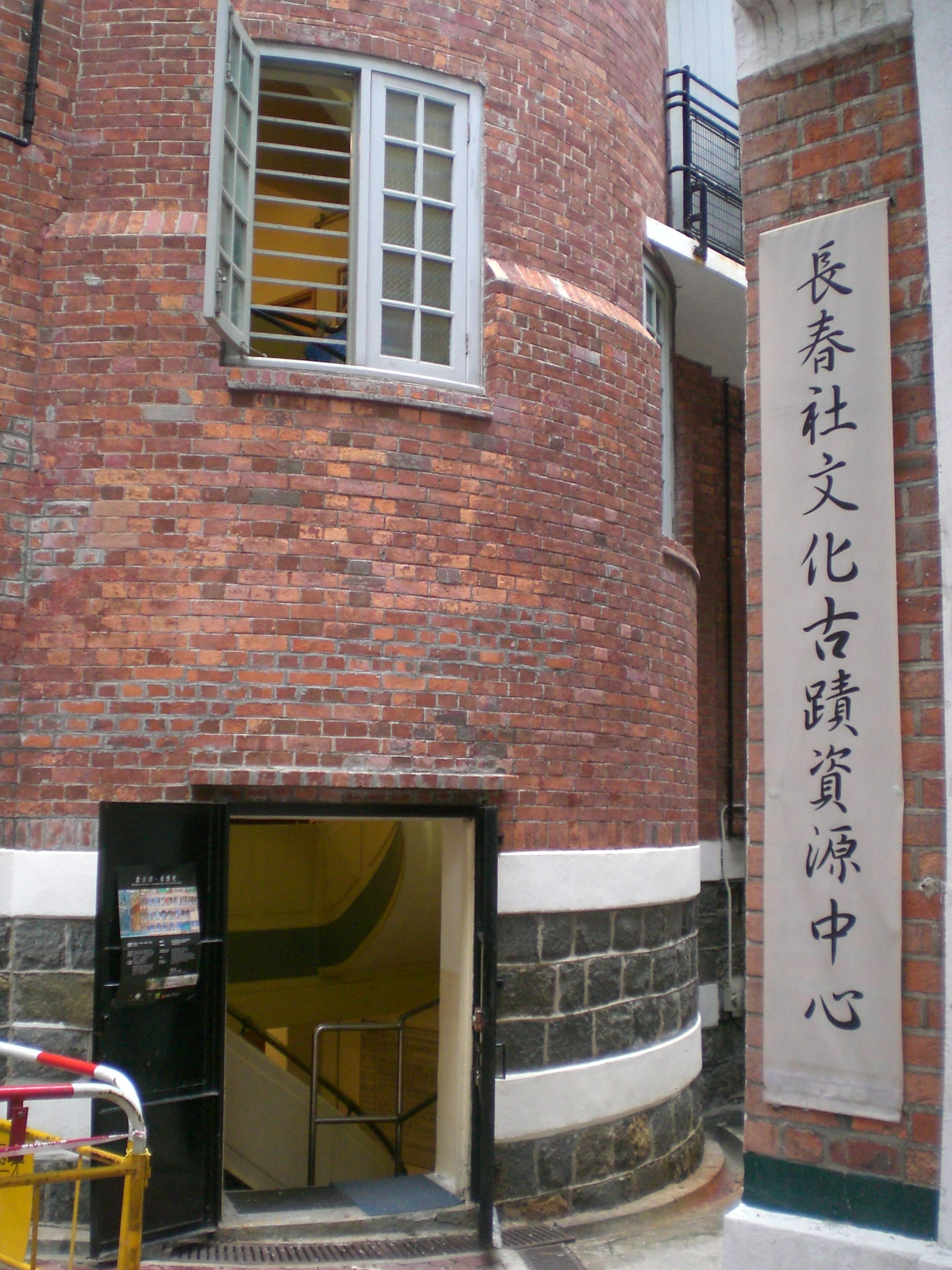
Hong Kong Resource Centre for Heritage, Western District Community Centre.

The hospital was opened by the English missionary group London Missionary Society on 17 October 1922. Initially opened as a maternity hospital to address the growing need for neonatal services and the training of midwives and obstetricians, Tsan Yuk was founded with the aim of meeting these demands. Dr. Alice D. Hickling, recruited by the London Missionary Society as the first foreign female doctor in Hong Kong, was appointed as the hospital's director. Recognizing the strong interest among women in Hong Kong to become professional midwives, she proposed providing training through the hospital. Dr. S.W. Tso (曹善允博士), Chairman of the Chinese Public Dispensary Committee (華人公共診所委員會), supported her idea. Consequently, Tsan Yuk evolved into one of Hong Kong's leading maternity teaching hospitals.

Tsan Yuk Hospital was closed in 1944, during the Japanese occupation of Hong Kong, and most of the furniture and equipment was moved to Pamela Youde Nethersole Eastern Hospital.

By the early 1950s, Tsan Yuk was experiencing bed shortages and limited places for patients. The Hong Kong Jockey Club donated $3,570,000 to build a new hospital on nearby Hospital Road. On 13 June 1955, Sir Alexander William George Herder Grantham held the opening ceremony for the new Tsan Yuk Hospital. Following the move, the premises were then used to house the Western District Community Centre.

== Current use ==
The Community Centre consists of activity rooms, exhibition rooms and lecture theatres. They are commonly used by the following organizations:

- The Hong Kong Committee on Children's Rights
- Sai Ying Pun Kai-fong Welfare Association
- Central & Western District Committee on Promotion of IT
- Hong Kong Breastfeeding Mothers' Association
- The Conservancy Association Centre for Heritage
- Yan Chai hospital Chinese Medicine Clinic
- Scout Association of Hong Kong, Western District, Hong Kong Island Region
- Tung Sin Tan
- Yuen Yuen VLearn Women Centre
- St James' Settlement Urban Renewal Social Service Team

== Conservation ==
On 18 September 2009, the building was classified as a Grade III historic building. This means it has been deemed of some significant merit by the Hong Kong Antiquities and Monuments Office, but does not yet qualify for consideration as a monument. It is also one of the 25 sites along the Section A of the "Western District and the Peak Route" of the Central and Western Heritage Trail.

=== Hong Kong Resource Centre for Heritage ===
In 2007, Hong Kong Resource Centre for Heritage, a Hong Kong-based NGO dedicated to protecting the environment and conserving cultural heritage, received a donation of HK$7.9 million from the Hong Kong Jockey Club. This money was put towards a renovation project at the former Tsan Yuk Hospital, now the Centre for Heritage, as well as for the launching of a three-year community engagement and education programme advocating the importance of cultural heritage conservation in Hong Kong.

The renovation occurred over a three-month period in 2008, and included the construction of a multi-purpose hall for exhibitions and public lectures and two activity rooms for holding functions that aim to raise public awareness on cultural and heritage conservation.

The community outreach component of the programme comprised a wide variety of activities geared towards enhancing recognition and appreciation of local culture amongst the community. Activities included workshops, seminars, exhibitions and guided tours, all of which embodied the theme of sustaining traditional practices in a modern world. Exhibitions in the past covered topics including the Western District community's culture, the architecture in the community and the life in grassroots community. The Centre also collaborates closely with primary and secondary schools and educational institutes to organise activities and design curriculum that promotes an authentic cultural experience for younger generations so they may develop a sense of cultural belongingness.
