= Second Street, Hong Kong =

Road in Hong Kong

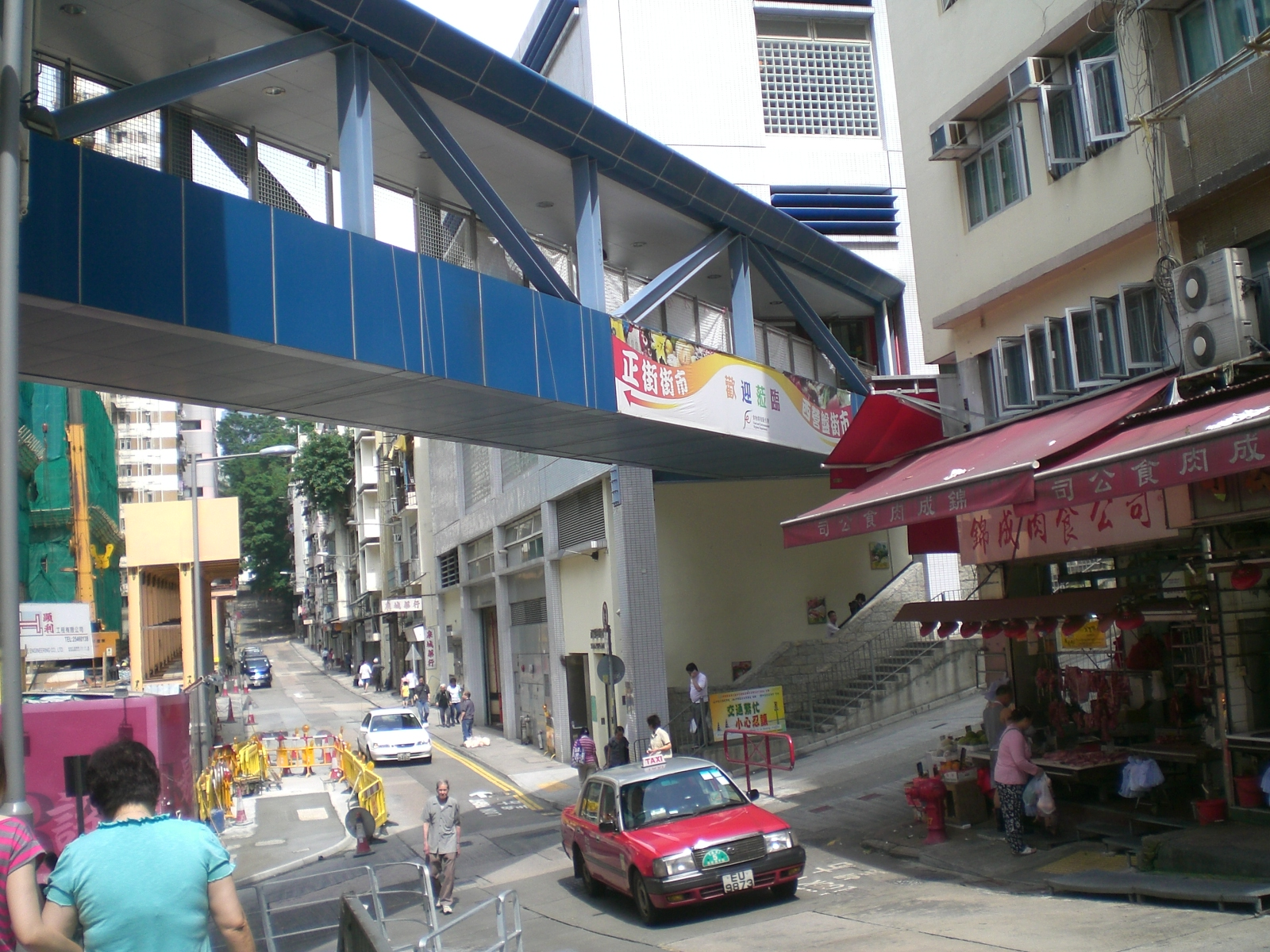
A view of Second Street, Hong Kong

Second Street (Chinese: 第二街; Jyutping: dai6 ji6 gaai1) is a street in the Sai Ying Pun area of the Central and Western District on Hong Kong Island, in Hong Kong.

The street is part of planned streets in the early development. High Street, Third Street, Second Street and First Street run east to west horizontally on a slope while Centre Street, Western Street and Eastern Street run north to south steeply.

Second Street is 450 meters (1,480 ft) long. It has alternating one way sections, running east to west from Pok Fu Lam Road to Water Street, and from Eastern Street to Western Street. Between Pok Fu Lam Road and Western Street traffic is from west to east. On the east side of Eastern Street, it continues into Hospital Road. There are 1507 units in the street.

== Side Lanes ==
Sheung Fung Lane goes up to Third Street and contains a nursing home, a tailor and a curtain shop. Tak Shing Lane goes up hill also. Un Fuk Lane extends up for a length of two cars and is interrupted by the Tong Nam Mansion.

== Transport ==
A foot bridge passes diagonally over the junction with Centre Street, connecting the Sai Ying Pun Market with the Centre Street Market buildings. Bus routes 7, 37B, 71, 973, 71P, and 973 have a bus stop between Pok Fu Lam Road and Water Street. Green Mini Bus routes 12 to Kwun Lung Lau and 45A to First Street use this street.

== Businesses ==
There are many small businesses in this street, with a couple of chain stores. The Sai Ying Pun Market and the Centre Street Market are on the corners with Centre Street.

== See also ==
- List of streets and roads in Hong Kong
