= Western Street, Hong Kong =

Street in Sai Ying Pun, Hong Kong

Coordinates: 22.28548°N 114.14077°E

- Traditional Chinese: 西邊街
Transcriptions
Yue: Cantonese
- Yale Romanization: Sāi bīn gāai
- Jyutping: Sai1 bin1 gaai1

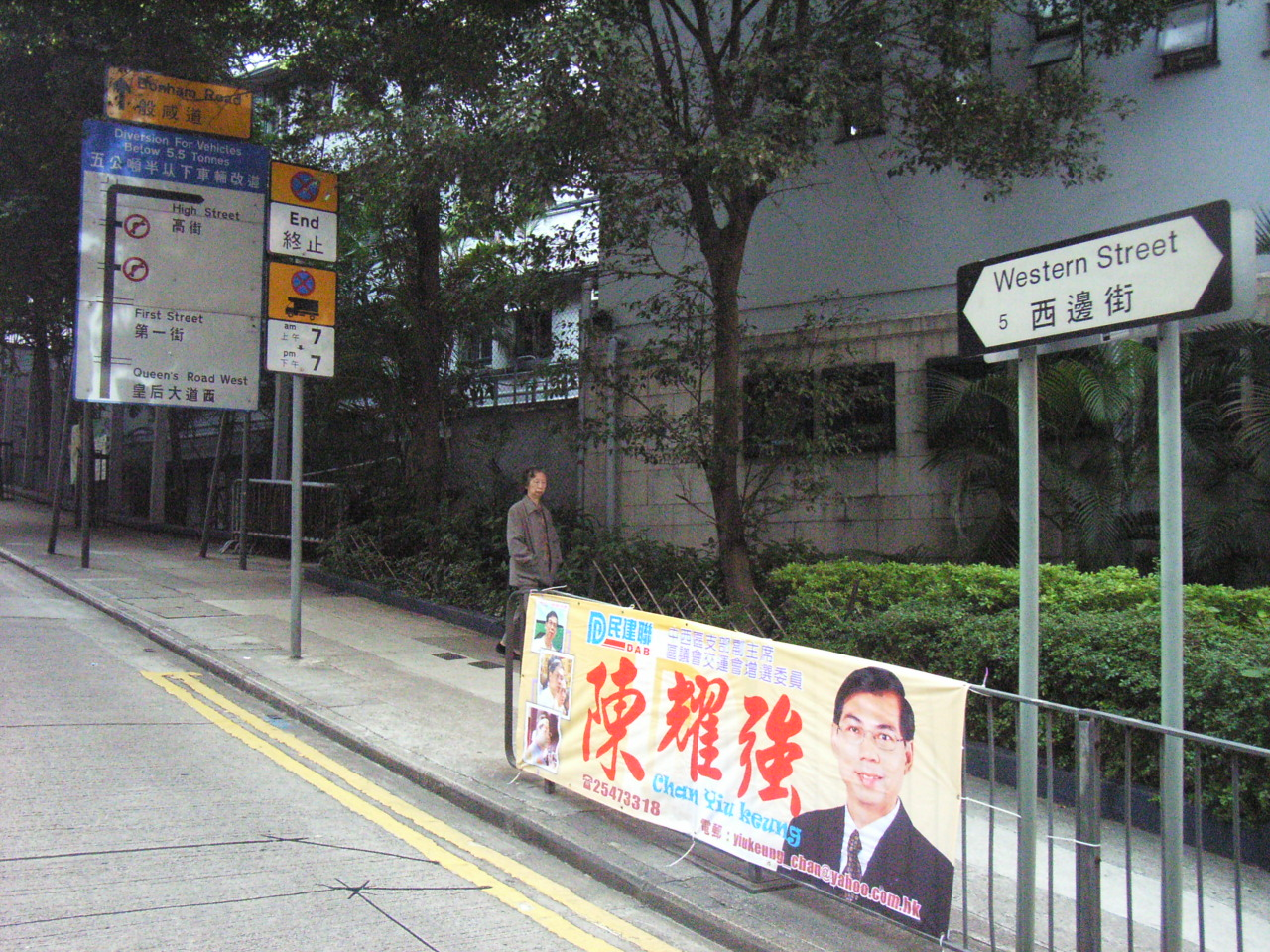
The corner of Western Street with Des Voeux Road West

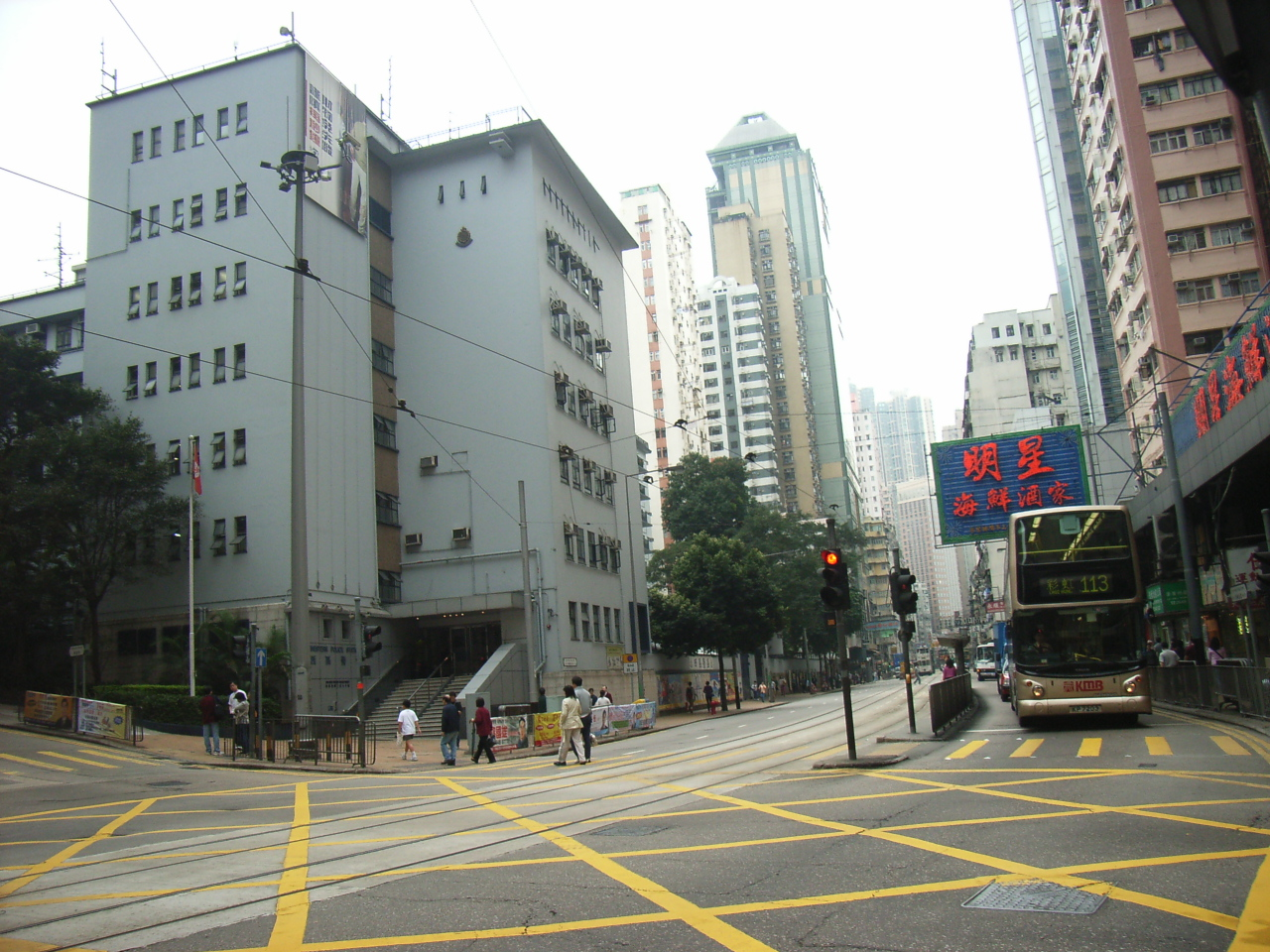
Western Police Station (originally called No. 7 Police Station)

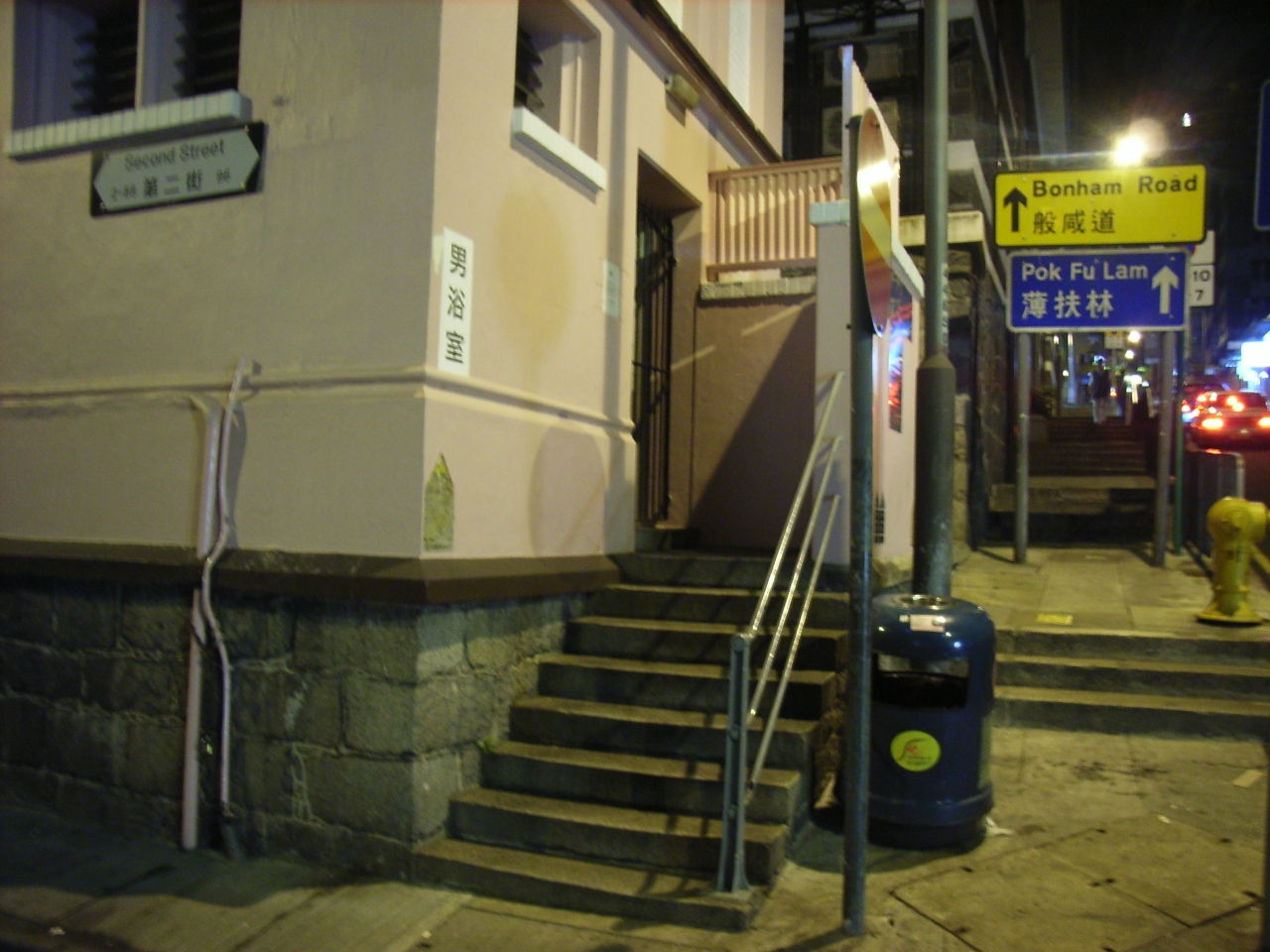
Old style public conveniences on the corner of Western Road and Second Street

Western Street (Chinese: 西邊街; lit. 'West Side Street') is a one-way street which climbs uphill from north to south in Sai Ying Pun, Hong Kong. It connects Honiton Road and Bonham Road in the south with Connaught Road West in the north.

Along with Eastern Street, it is one of the oldest streets in Hong Kong.

Buildings on the west side of the street are allocated odd numbers, whilst those on the east side are mostly even. The newer part of the street (built on reclaimed land north of Queen's Road West) has both odd and even numbered addresses on its east side.

== Landmarks ==
From north to south

- Western Police Station, on the corner of Des Voeux Road West
- Western Magistracy, government offices between Queen's Road West and First Street.
- Western District Community Centre, between Second and Third Streets. The building opened in 1922 as the Tsan Yuk Maternity Hospital, and operated under the aegis of the Chinese Public Dispensary Committee.
- Kau Yan School and Kau Yan Church, below High Street
- King's College, near Bonham Road

== Residential buildings ==
Named residential buildings from north to south

- Wing Cheung Building, contains 90 units spread across 23 floors
- King's Hill, contains 166 units spread across 26 floors

== Intersecting streets ==
From north to south

- Connaught Road West
- Des Voeux Road West
- Pok Fu Lam Road
- Queen's Road West
- First Street
- Second Street
- Third Street
- High Street
- Bonham Road

== See also ==
- List of streets and roads in Hong Kong
