= Third Street, Hong Kong =

Street in Hong Kong

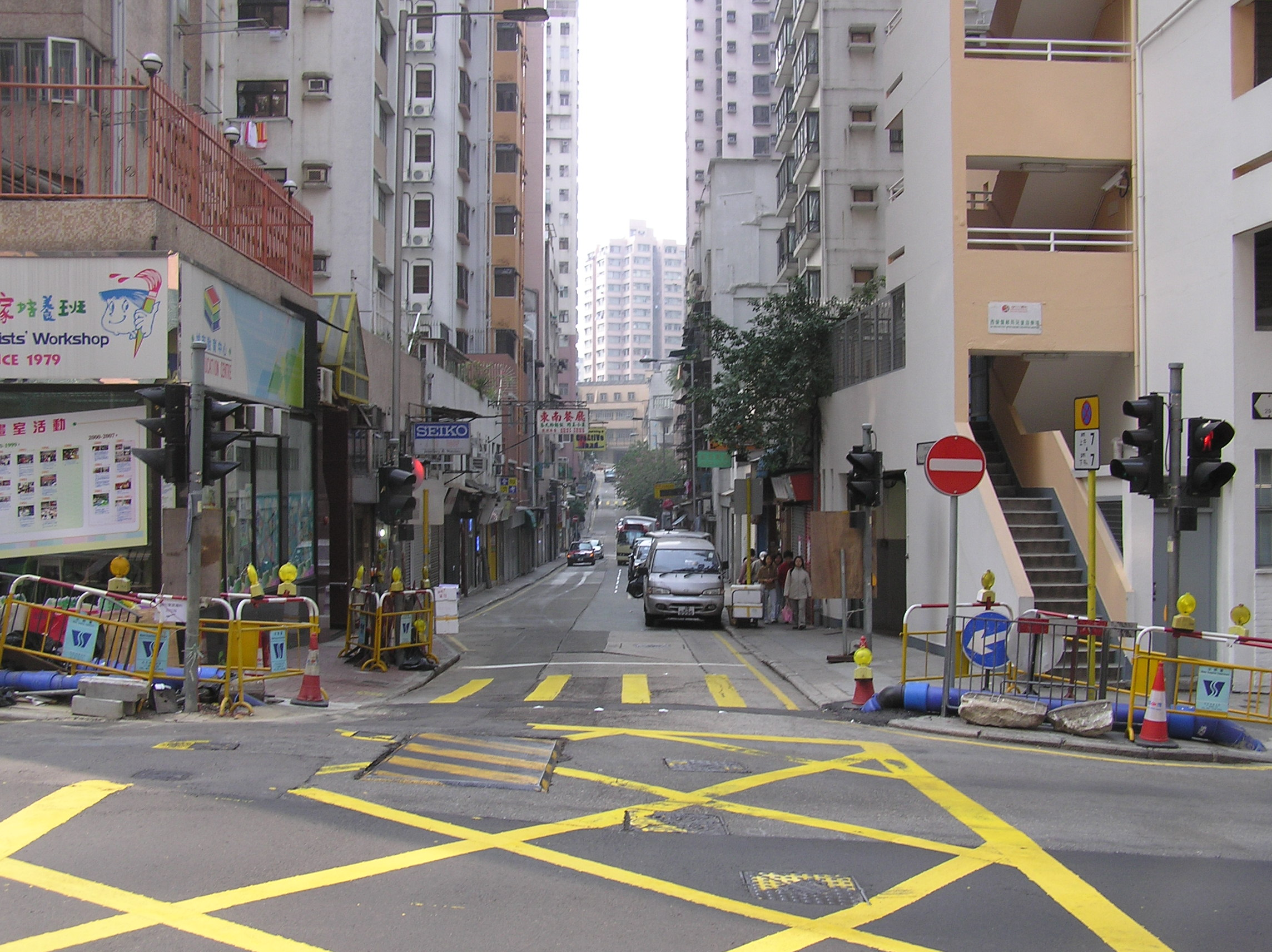
A view of Third Street, looking west from 30 Pok Fu Lam Road.

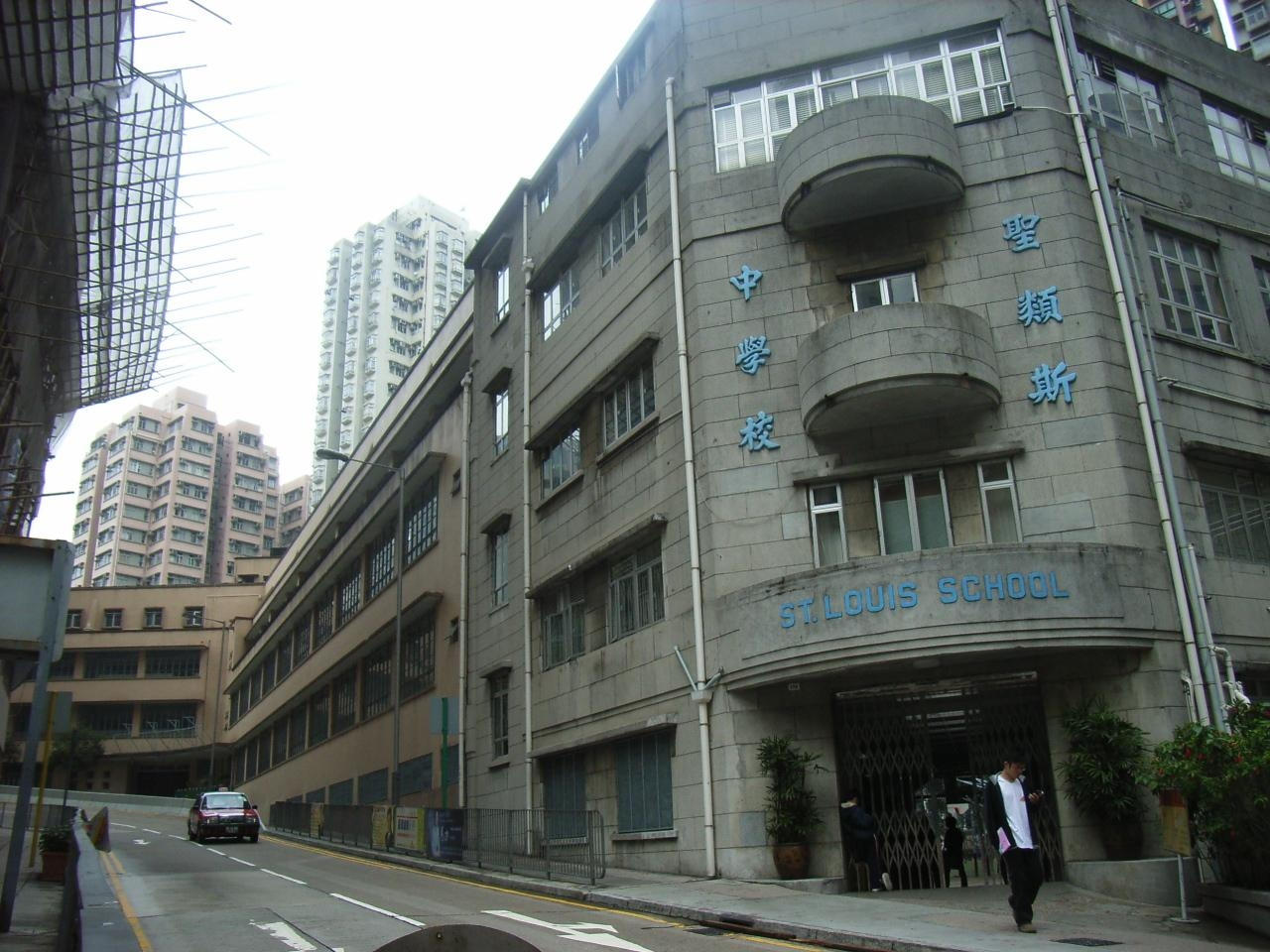
Facade of St. Louis School in Third Street.

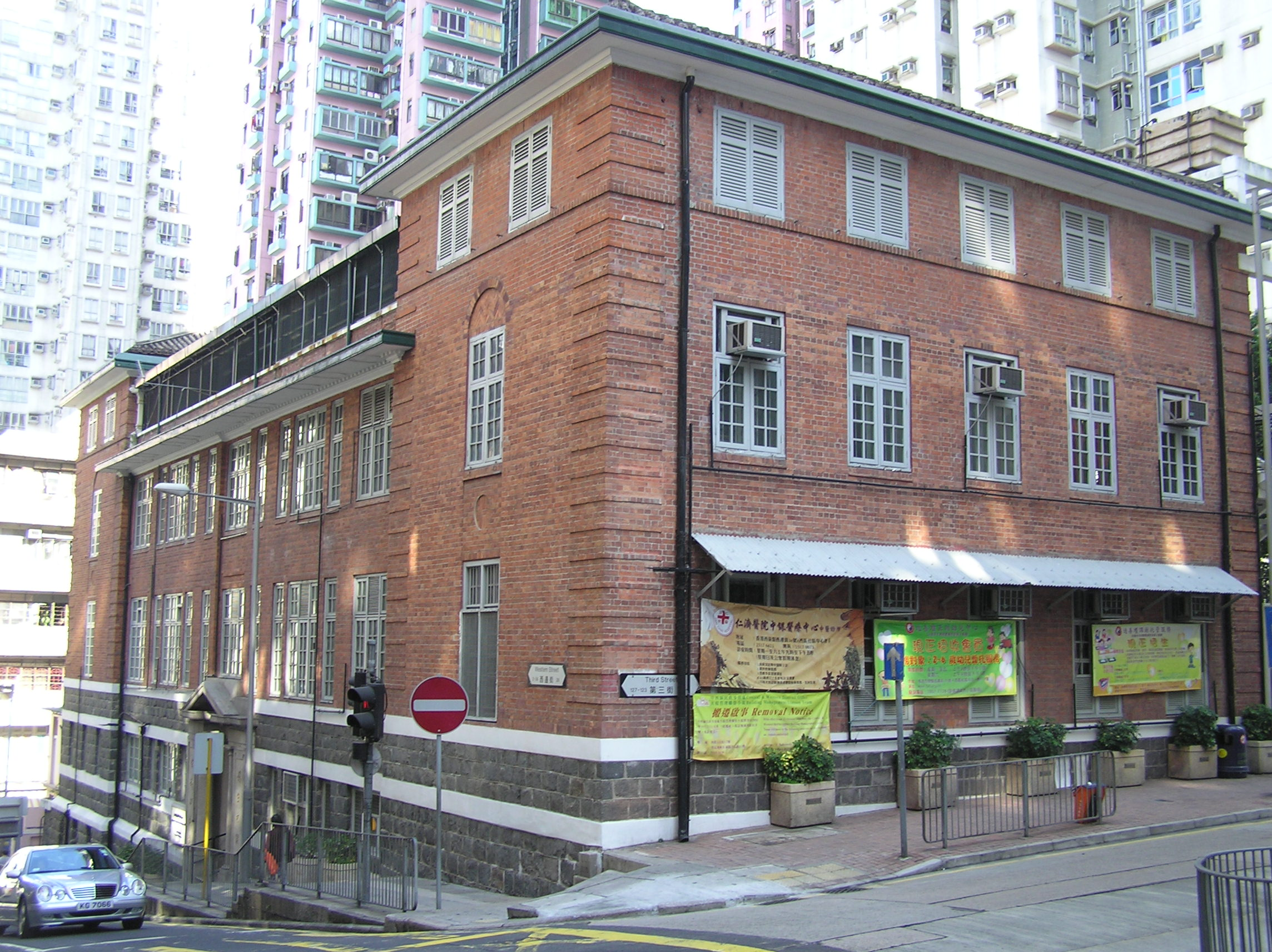
Old Tsan Yuk Maternity Hospital at the corner of Western Street and Third Street.

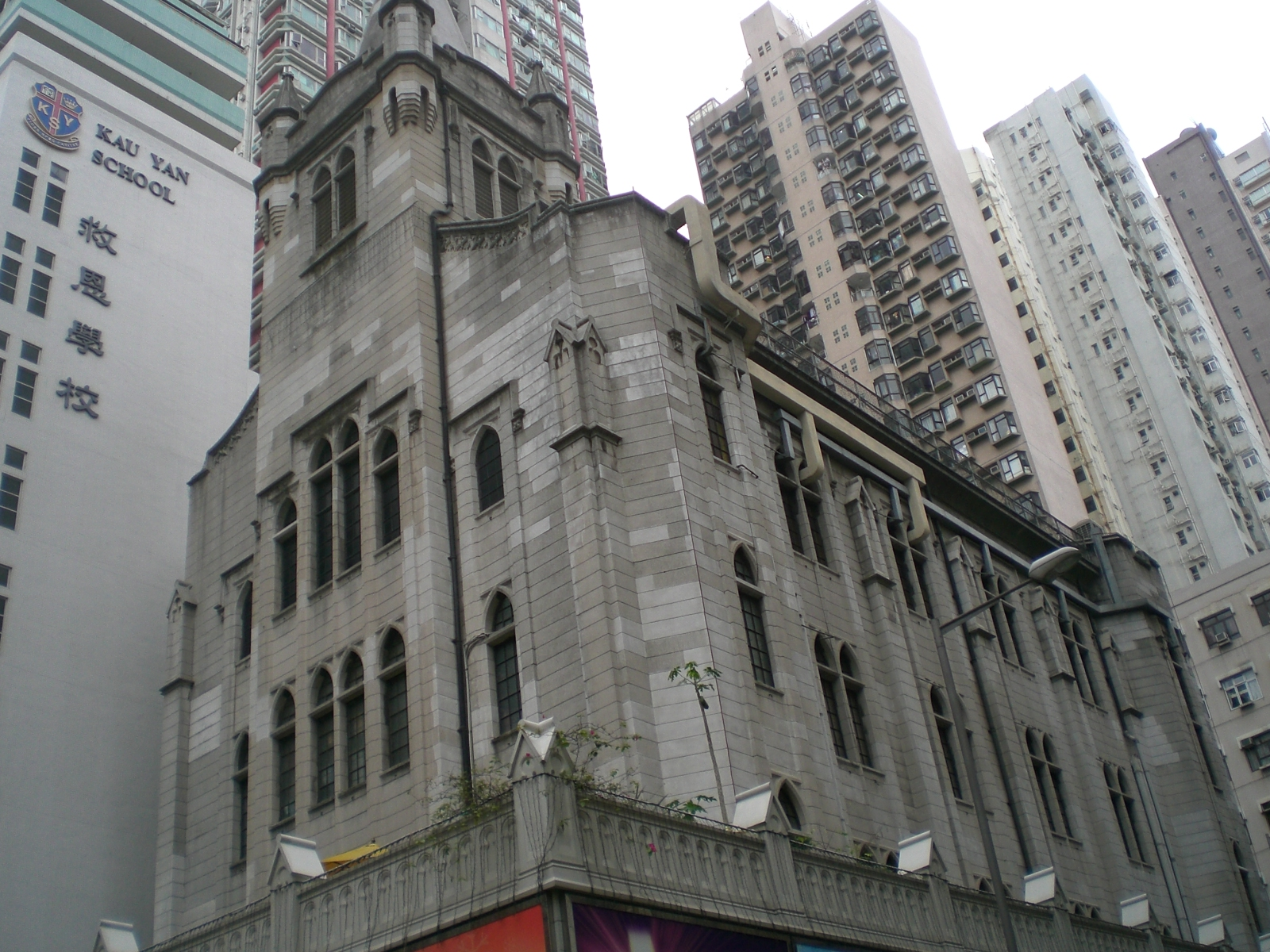
Third Street facade of the Kau Yan Church.

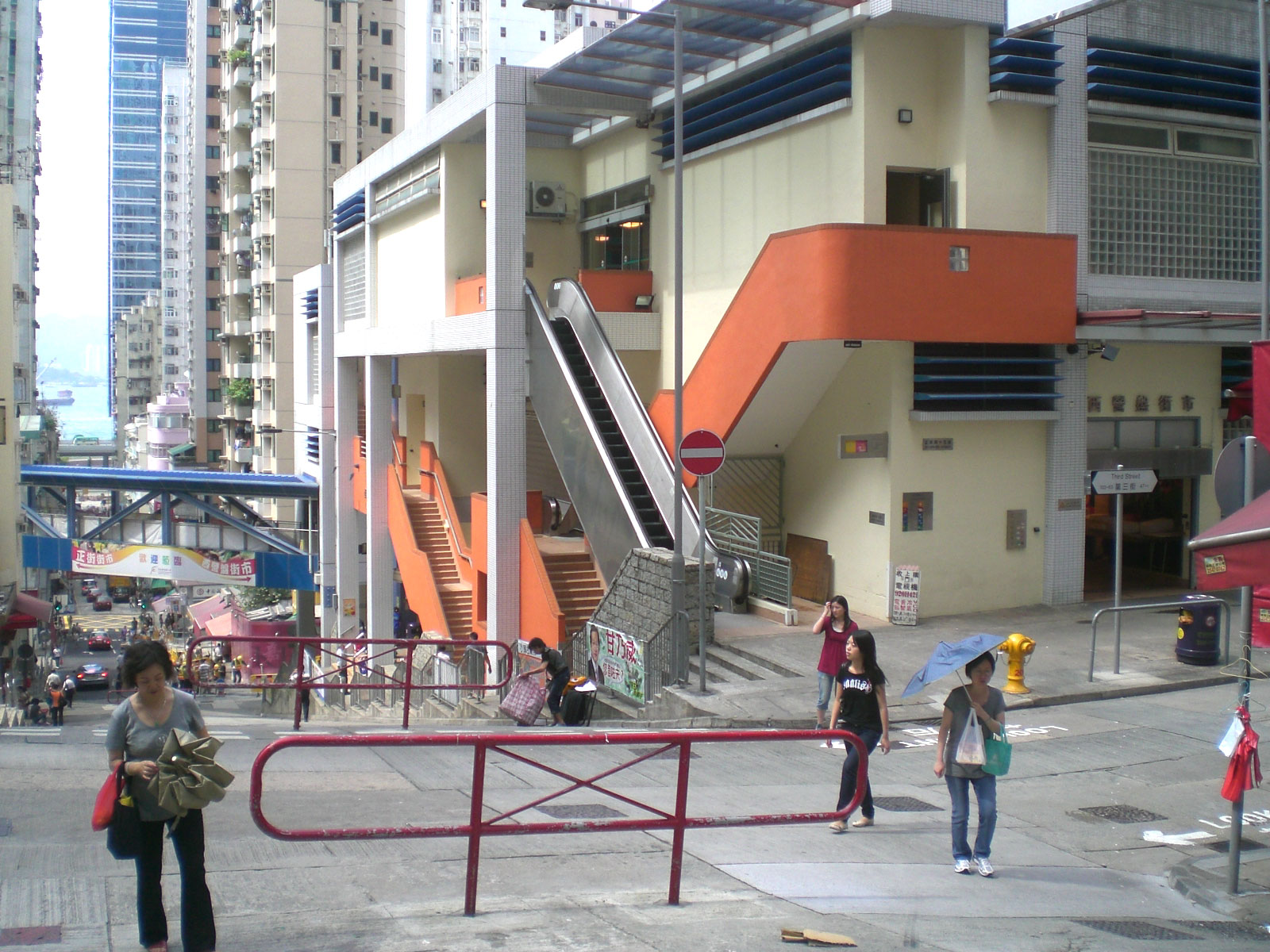
Sai Ying Pun Market, at the corner of Third Street (left-right) and Centre Street (front).

Third Street (Chinese: 第三街), is a street in Sai Ying Pun neighbourhood of Hong Kong. It runs one way from Pok Fu Lam Road, then crosses Water Street, then Pok Fu Lam Road again, then Western Street, Centre Street and terminates at Eastern Street.

The street is part of planned streets in the early development. High Street, Third Street, Second Street and First Street run east to west horizontally on a slope while Centre Street, Western Street and Eastern Street run north to south steeply.

== Side lanes ==
- Kwong Fung Lane is open to vehicle traffic one way down to Queen's Road West.
- Yau Yee Lane extends south to Third Street Playground, and a basketball court.
- Fuk Sau Lane connects through to Second Street.
- Sheung Fung Lane heads down to Second Street.
- There are steps up to Yu Lok Lane, which comes off Centre Street.
- Un Fuk Lane used to connect to Second Street, but has been interrupted by the Tong Nam Mansion.
- Leung I Fong extends up to High Street, and has 14 addresses on it.
- Ui On Lane goes down to Second Street.
- Un Shing Lane is parallel to the street on the south and is connected by steps.
- Kwok Hing Lane goes down on the north.

== Businesses ==
Along Third Street there are many small businesses including ten food retailers (two specialising in bean curd), seven food wholesalers (including a coffee specialist), six cafés, a Chinese liquor factory, the Yu Kwan Yick chili sauce factory outlet, five tutors, five music schools, five electrical shops, two laundries, seven real estate agents, two restaurants, five auto mechanics, four green grocers, three decoration shops, four clothes shops, two beauty salons, three builders, and a drink shop, a florist, cleaning products shop, hair dresser, pet products, vet, art school, carpet shop, a stationer, a paper goods shop, a hardware store, a paper recycler, an Indonesian products shop and a refuse collection depot.

Larger enterprise Uselect supermarket, Government Post office can also be found in the Third Street.

The top of the Sai Ying Pun Market opens on to Third Street with fish mongers and butcher stalls on that level.

== Notable buildings ==
- Sai Ying Pun Market (corner with Centre Street)
- Old Tsan Yuk Maternity Hospital (corner with Western Street)
- Kau Yan Church (corner with Western Street, opposite Old Tsan Yuk Maternity Hospital)
- Tong lau: Nos. 145, 147, 149, 151, 153
- St. Louis School (#179, corner with Kwong Fung Lane)

== Transport ==
An escalator can take pedestrians up from First or Second Street through the market to Third Street. A Red Mini Bus travels to the east of Hong Kong labelled Daimaru. Green Mini Bus 12 also travels along the street.

== Use in fiction ==
The TVB drama A Journey Called Life was supposedly set on Third Street, Sai Ying Pun. A main character, Fat Boss, played by Kent Cheng, was described as the Security Guard of No. 3 Street (第三街保長).

== See also ==
- List of streets and roads in Hong Kong
