= Pok Fu Lam Road =

Road on Hong Kong Island, Hong Kong

Coordinates: 22.25798°N 114.13674°E

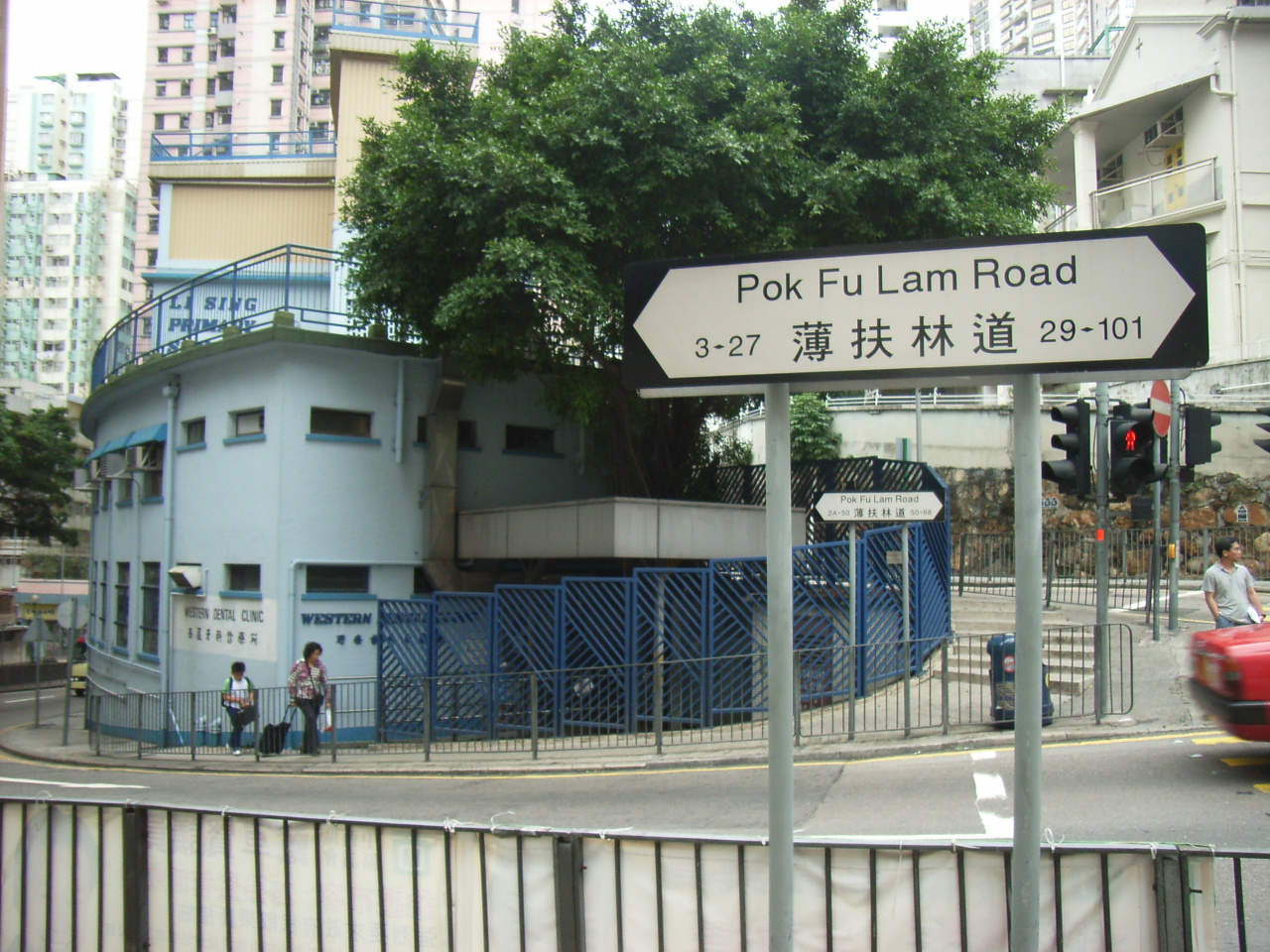
- Pok Fu Lam Road near Li Sing Primary School
- Interactive map of Pok Fu Lam Road
- Length: 5.1 km (3.2 mi); 5.0 km (3.1 mi) two-way, 0.1 km (0.062 mi) one-way
- South end: Shek Pai Wan Road
- North end: Queen's Road West

Pok Fu Lam Road
- Chinese: 薄扶林道
Transcriptions
Standard Mandarin
- Hanyu Pinyin: Bófúlín Dào
Yue: Cantonese
- Yale Romanization: Bok fùh làhm douh
- Jyutping: Bok3 fu6 lam4 dou6

Pok Fu Lam Road (Chinese: 薄扶林道; Jyutping: bok6 fu4 lam4 dou6), or Pokfulam Road, is a four-lane road in Hong Kong. Built on Hong Kong Island, the road runs between Sai Ying Pun and Wah Fu, through Pok Fu Lam.

== Description ==
It runs south from Sai Ying Pun, passing The University of Hong Kong along the Belcher's, with a road junction with Pokfield Road. The vegetation in this area is largely preserved, unlike many roads in the urban built-up areas of Hong Kong. Further south, the Pok Fu Lam playground, a public playground, is located near the junction with Mount Davis Road in Mount Davis. Down the road, Queen Mary Hospital, a large hospital complex, borders the junction with Sassoon Road and Bisney Road. Recently, the junction was renovated into a large intersection with highway loops, to ease traffic congestion. Further down the road, there is a large reservoir, a school for the blind, a vocational education centre and two large housing complexes: Chi Fu Fa Yuen and Pokfulam Gardens. The road ends at the Pokfulam Fire Station.

== Spelling ==
The road name is always spelled as Three words Pok Fu Lam Road (see road sign above), and not Pokfulam Road.

Along Pok Fu Lam Road is a property development, The Belcher's, built in 2000–2001.

== Intersections ==
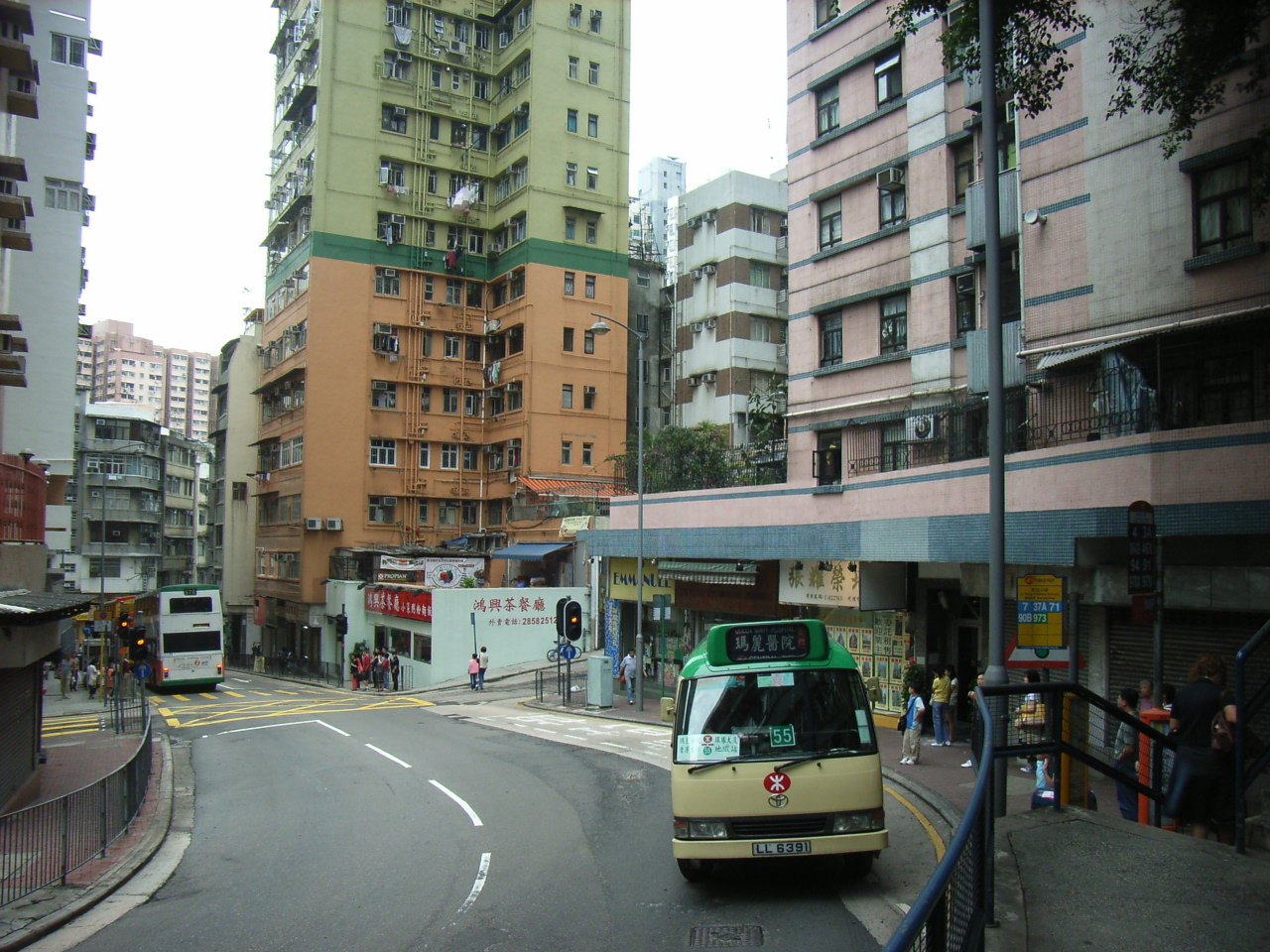
The portion of the road near Sai Ying Pun

Listed from south to north.

District	Location	km	mi	Destinations	Notes
Southern	Waterfall Bay	0.0– 0.2	0.0– 0.12	Wah Fu Road / Shek Pai Wan Road	Trumpet interchange; Southern terminus
Southern	Waterfall Bay	0.3	0.19	Victoria Road	
Southern	Pok Fu Lam	0.5– 0.7	0.31– 0.43	Chi Fu Road	Trumpet interchange
Southern	Pok Fu Lam	1.0– 1.1	0.62– 0.68	Chi Fu Road	Modified trumpet interchange
Southern	Pok Fu Lam	1.4	0.87	Pok Fu Lam Reservoir Road	
Southern	Sandy Bay	2.3– 2.5	1.4– 1.6	Sassoon Road	Partial cloverleaf interchange
Southern	Sandy Bay	2.6	1.6	Bisney Road	Northbound only
Central and Western	Kennedy Town	3.3	2.1	Mount Davis Road / Smithfield	
Central and Western	Kennedy Town	3.8	2.4	Pokfield Road	
Central and Western	Shek Tong Tsui	4.3	2.7	Hill Road Flyover to Route 4 east	Northbound only
Central and Western	Shek Tong Tsui	4.5– 4.6	2.8– 2.9	Hill Road / Bonham Road	No access from southbound to eastbound Bonham Road
Central and Western	Shek Tong Tsui	4.6	2.9	Third Street	Northbound only
Central and Western	Sai Ying Pun	4.8	3.0	Kui Yan Lane	Pedestrianized
Central and Western	Sai Ying Pun	4.8	3.0	Water Street	
Central and Western	Sai Ying Pun	4.8	3.0	High Street	
Central and Western	Sai Ying Pun	4.9	3.0	Rose Lane	Pedestrianized
Central and Western	Sai Ying Pun	4.9	3.0	Third Street	
Central and Western	Sai Ying Pun	5.0	3.1	Second Street	Two-way street ends
1.000 mi = 1.609 km; 1.000 km = 0.621 mi: Closed/former; Incomplete access

=== One-way section ===
Listed from north to south. The entire road is in Sai Ying Pun, Central and Western District.

km	mi	Destinations	Notes
0.00	0.00	Queen's Road West	
0.03	0.019	Sam To Lane	Pedestrianized
0.05	0.031	First Street	
0.08	0.050	Sai Wa Lane	Pedestrianized
0.10	0.062	Second Street	End of one-way street
1.000 mi = 1.609 km; 1.000 km = 0.621 mi: Closed/former

== See also ==
- St. John's College, located at No. 82 Pok Fu Lam Road
- Ricci Hall, located at No. 93 Pok Fu Lam Road
- Hong Kong Chinese Christian Churches Union Pok Fu Lam Road Cemetery, located at No. 125 Pok Fu Lam Road
- Béthanie, located at No. 139 Pok Fu Lam Road
- University Hall, located at No. 144 Pok Fu Lam Road, a student hall of the University of Hong Kong
- List of streets and roads in Hong Kong
