= Kau Yan Church =

Church building in Sai Ying Pun, Hong Kong

Kau Yan Tsung Tsin Church
- 基督教香港崇真會救恩堂
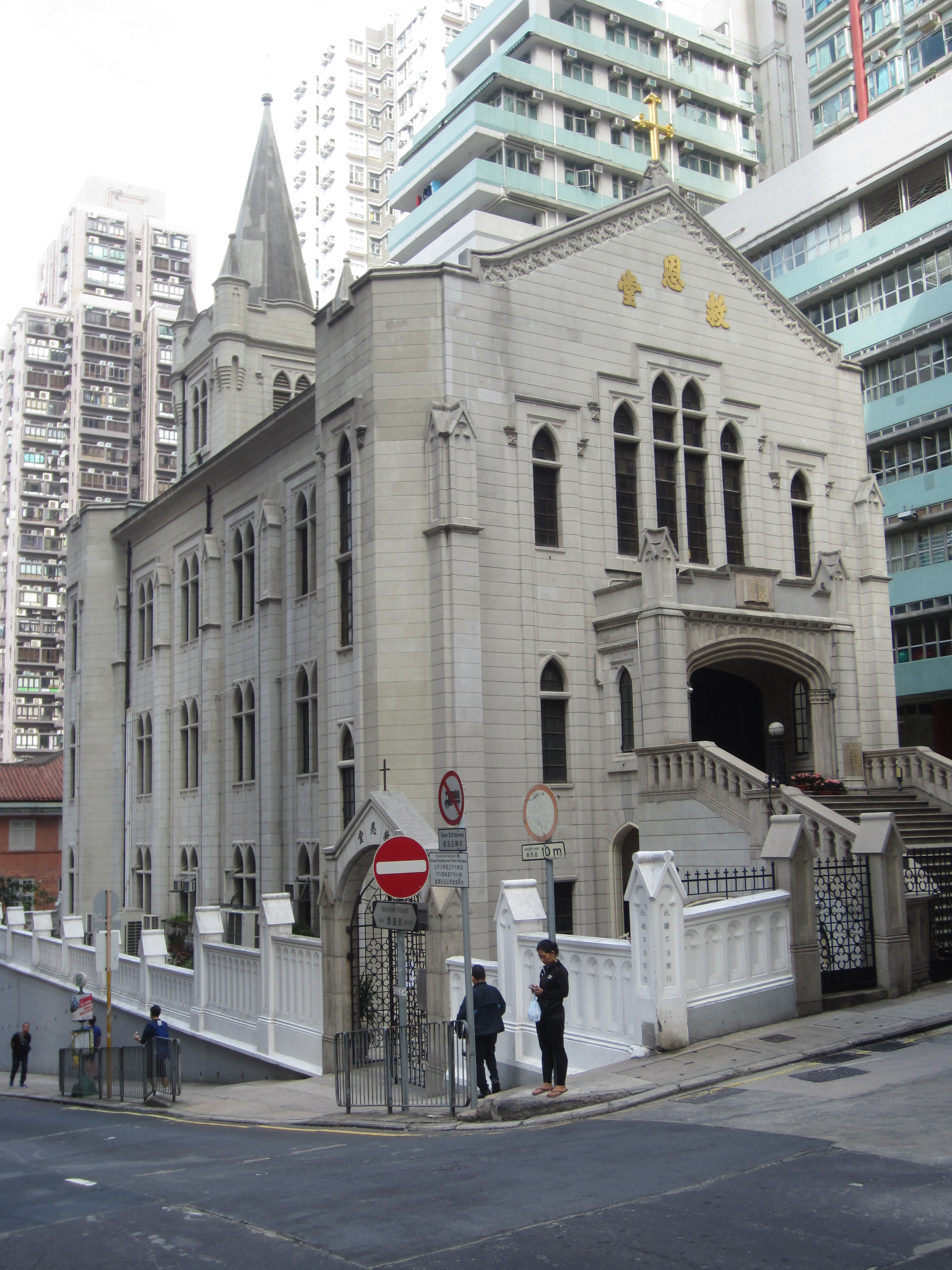
- The church building's exterior, 2017

- Location within Hong Kong

Religion
- Affiliation: Christianity
- Sect: Protestantism
- District: Sai Ying Pun

Location
- Location: 97A High Street
- Country: Hong Kong
- Interactive map of Kau Yan Tsung Tsin Church
- Coordinates: 22.285494°N 114.140864°E

Architecture
- Architects: Palmer and Turner
- Style: External: Neo-Gothic & Tudor; Internal: Romanesque & Neo-Classical
- Founder: Rudolph Lechler of the Society of Basel Mission (巴色傳道會)
- Established: 1852; 174 years ago
- Groundbreaking: 1 June 1931; 95 years ago
- Completed: 24 December 1932; 93 years ago

Kau Yan Church
- Traditional Chinese: 基督教香港崇真會救恩堂
Transcriptions
Yue: Cantonese
- Yale Romanization: Gēi dūk gaau hēung góng sùhng jān wúih gau yān tòhng
- Jyutping: Gei1 duk1 gaau3 hoeng1 gong2 sung4 zan1 wui5 gau3 jan1 tong4

Tsung Tsin Mission of Hong Kong Kau Yan Church is a church in Sai Ying Pun, Hong Kong. The building is located at Western Street, between Third and High Streets. The church was established by the Basel Mission and is now succeeded by the Tsung Tsin Mission of Hong Kong.

The existing Gothic Revival church building was completed in 1932, but the church's history dates back to 1861, when Rev Theodore Hamberg established a Hakka congregation at the site.

== See also ==
- Tsung Tsin Mission of Hong Kong
