= Sai Ying Pun Market =

Market in Hong Kong

Coordinates: 22.285899°N 114.142442°E

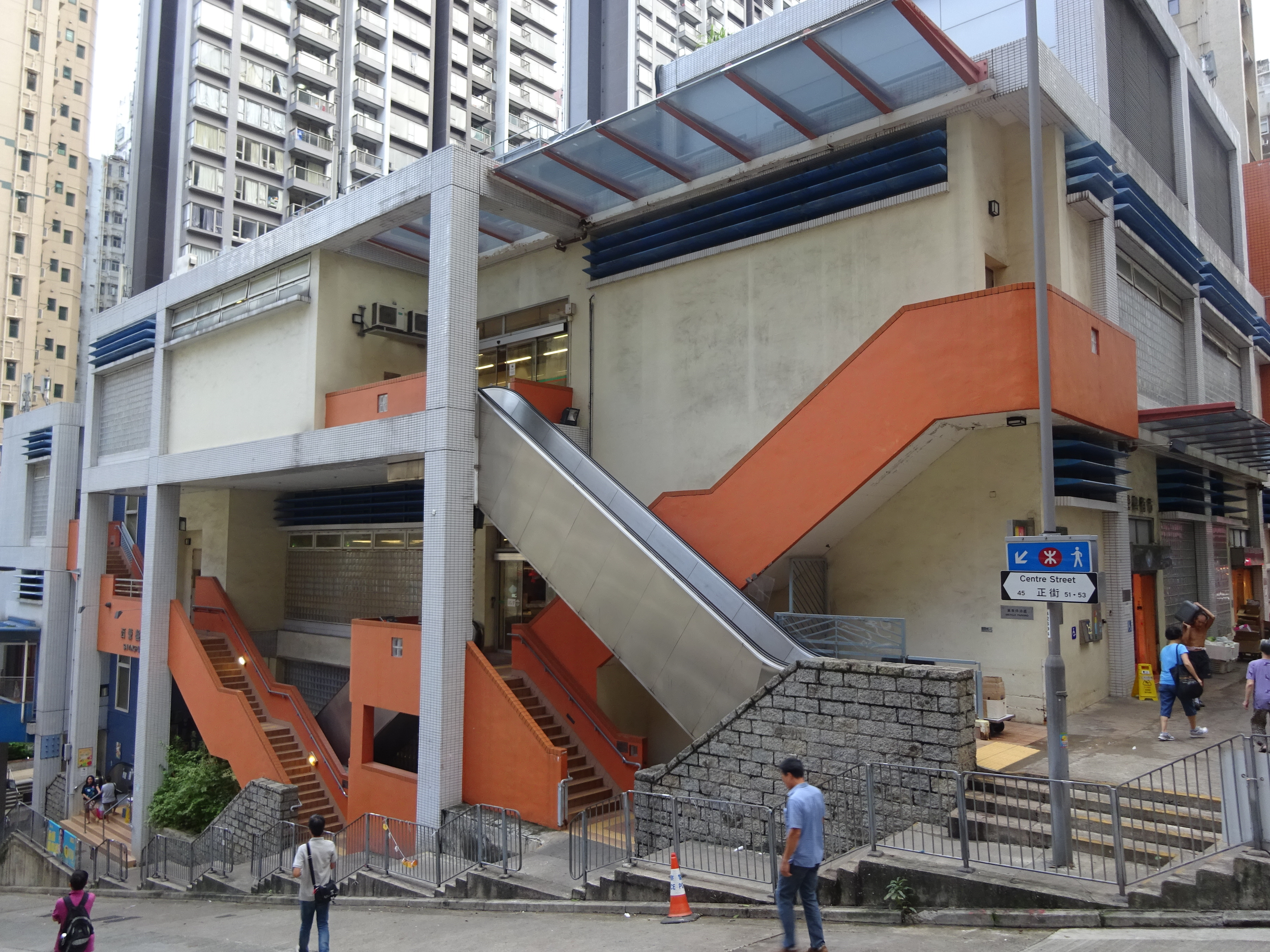
- The market's exterior in August 2016
- Location: 45 Centre Street; Sai Ying Pun, Hong Kong
- Environment: Indoor
- Goods sold: Wet market
- Days normally open: Sunday – Saturday
- Number of tenants: ~100
- Total retail floor area: 1,200 square metres (13,000 sq ft)
- Interactive map of Sai Ying Pun Market

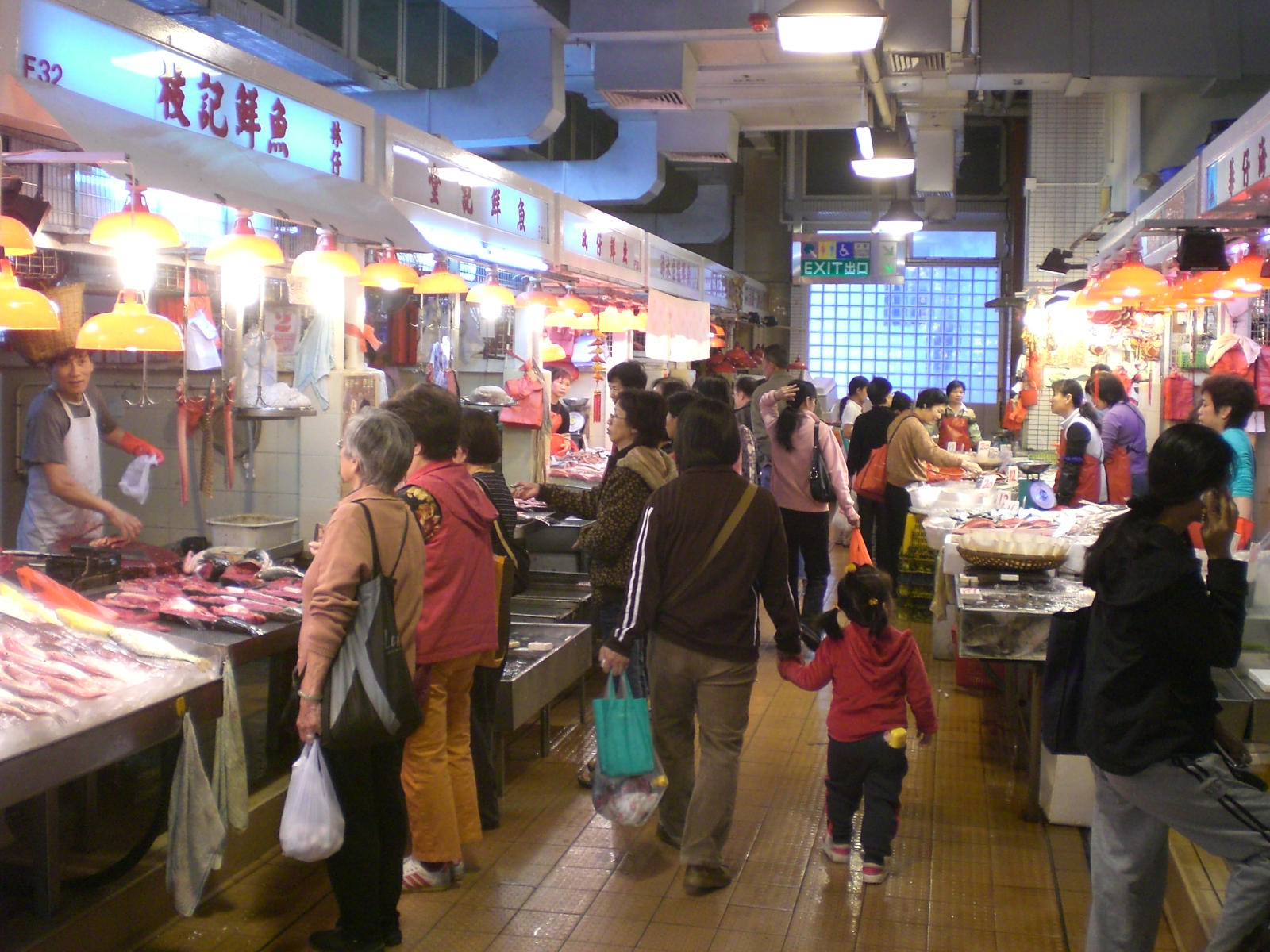
The market's interior in December 2007

Sai Ying Pun Market (Chinese: 西營盤街市) is an indoor market along Centre Street, between Second and Third Streets, in Central and Western District's Sai Ying Pun, in Hong Kong near Sai Ying Pun station.
