= High Street, Hong Kong =

One-way street in Hong Kong

- Traditional Chinese: 高街
Transcriptions
Yue: Cantonese
- Yale Romanization: Gōu gāai
- Jyutping: Gou1 gaai1

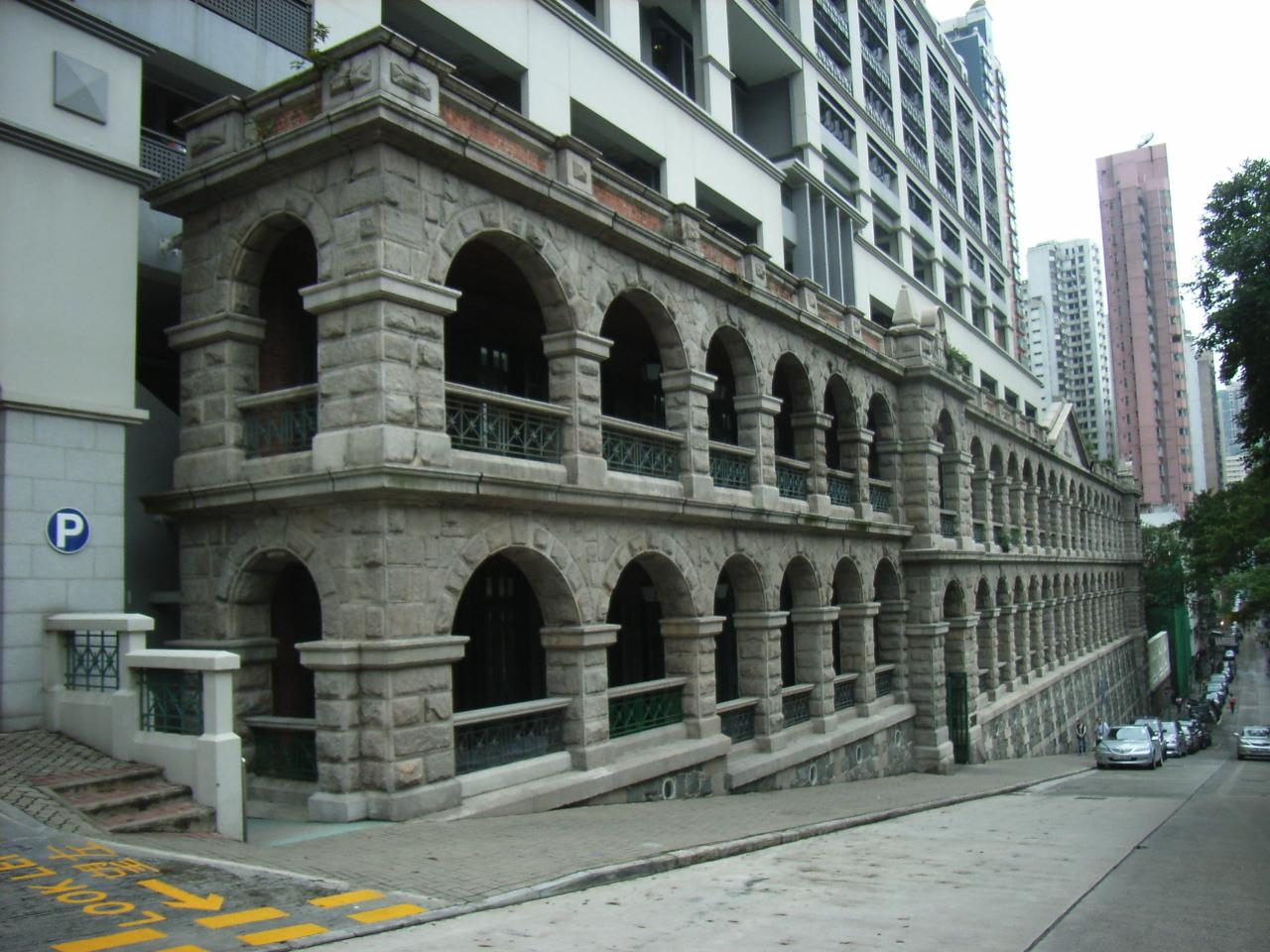
Sai Ying Pun Community Complex

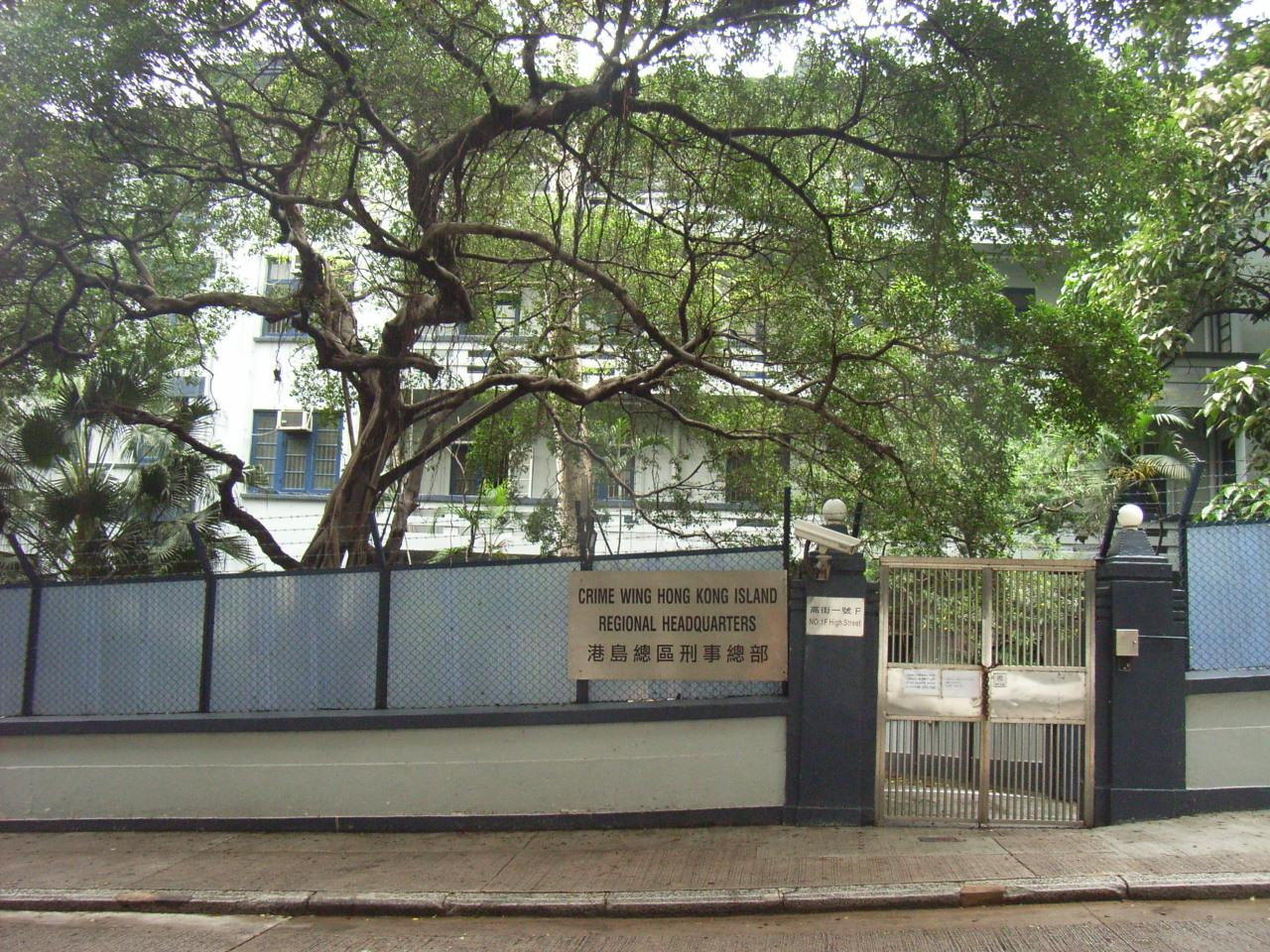
Crime Hong Kong Island Regional Headquarters

High Street (Chinese: 高街) is a one-way street in Sai Ying Pun, Hong Kong, available only to minibuses and private vehicles. It connects Bonham Road in the east and Pok Fu Lam Road in the west. It runs from east to west from Western Street to Pok Fu Lam Road, and from west to east from Western Street to Bonham Road. It was originally named Fourth Street, but because the number four is commonly avoided in Chinese culture, the government changed the name to High Street.

== Landmarks ==
- Bonham Road Government Primary School, formerly the Northcote College of Education, which also had a campus at the junction of Sassoon Road and Northcote Close, Pok Fu Lam. In the early 1990s, it merged with the other colleges of education to form the Hong Kong Institute of Education in Tai Po. The Pok Fu Lam campus was taken over by the University of Hong Kong to become part of its Li Ka Shing Faculty of Medicine.
- Sai Ying Pun Community Complex
- King George V Memorial Park
- Sai Ying Pun Market
- Kau Yan Church and Kau Yan School (in English Kau Yan means Saviour).
- Li Sing Primary School
- Western Dental Clinic
- David Trench Rehabilitation Centre (Former Upper Levels Police Station)
- St. Paul's Secondary School, one of the top secondary school in Hong Kong.

Other large apartment buildings include Hang Sing Mansion, Lai Ying Court, Wealth Building, Aspen Court, Cheong King Building, High House, Ko Chun Court, Ko Nga Court, Jade Court, and No 1 High Street.

== Side roads and lanes ==
In addition to Western Street, High Street also crosses Centre Street, and Eastern Street. Between Centre and Eastern Streets, there are two laneways for pedestrians, Leung I Fong down to Third Street, and West End Path up to Bonham Road.

== Businesses ==
Many small businesses line the central parts of High Street, and the Immanuel Social Service Centre.

== See also ==
- List of streets and roads in Hong Kong
- Third Street
