= Eastern Street, Hong Kong =

Street in Sai Ying Pun, Hong Kong

Coordinates: 22°17′06″N 114°08′37″E

- Traditional Chinese: 東邊街
Transcriptions
Yue: Cantonese
- Yale Romanization: Dūng bīn gāai
- Jyutping: Dung1 bin1 gaai1

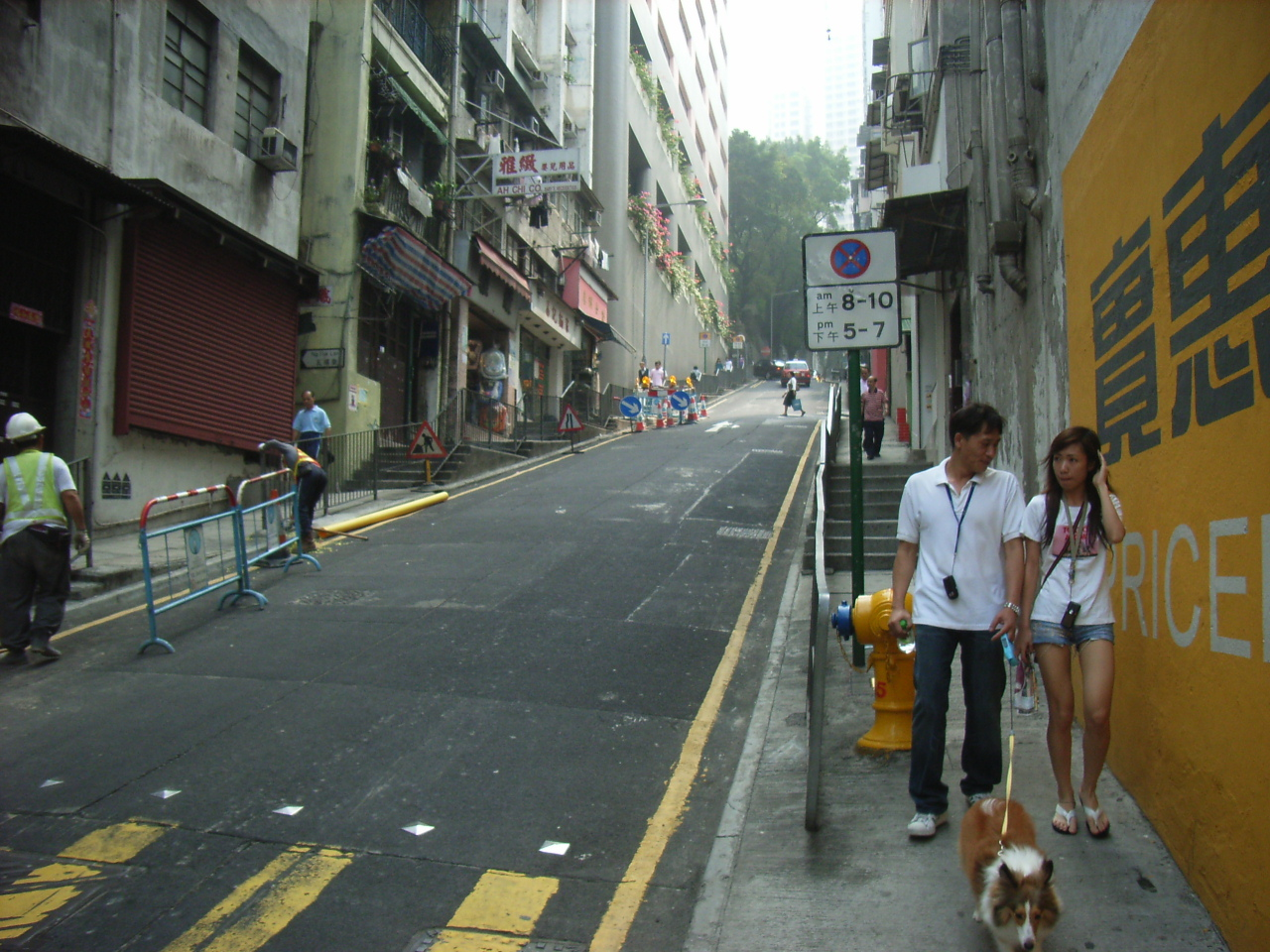
Eastern Street, looking south from the junction with Queen's Road West

Located in the Sai Ying Pun neighbourhood of Hong Kong Island, Eastern Street (Chinese: 東邊街; lit. 'East Side Street') is among the oldest streets in Hong Kong. Eastern Street North (東邊街北) is an extension of the street leading to the seafront, following progressive harbour reclamations.

== Eastern Street ==
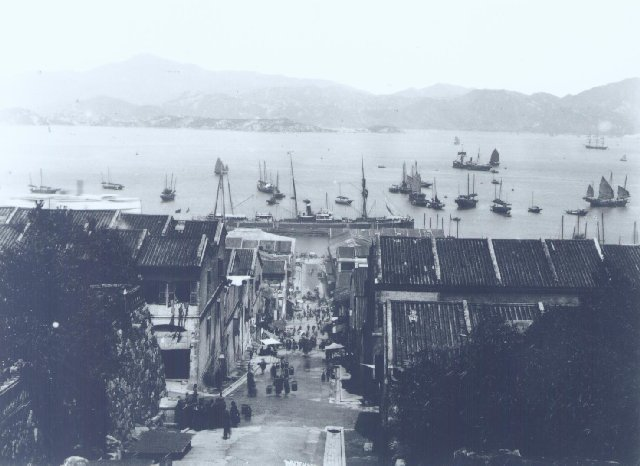
Eastern Street c.1890

The street was one of the first thoroughfares to have been planned during the early development of Victoria City.

The street starts in the Mid-Levels near Bonham Road Government Primary School below Bonham Road, and runs down Connaught Road West, crossing High Street, Third Street, Second Street, First Street, Queen's Road Central, and Des Voeux Road West.

It descends in a steep straight line from the Mid-Levels to the harbour. Its sharp incline, with a gradient of 1:5, has been the cause of several traffic accidents over the decades, wherein large vehicles have lost control, and rolled down the steep hill.

Road signs warning of this danger were installed at various points along the street, following the most recent incident in July 2012 where a truck rolled back almost 30 metres (98 ft).

== Eastern Street North ==
The extension Eastern Street North (東邊街北), from Connaught Road West, is a continuation of Eastern Street to Victoria Harbour and the Sun Yat Sen Memorial Park.

== See also ==
- List of streets and roads in Hong Kong
