= Hing Hon Road =

Street in Hong Kong

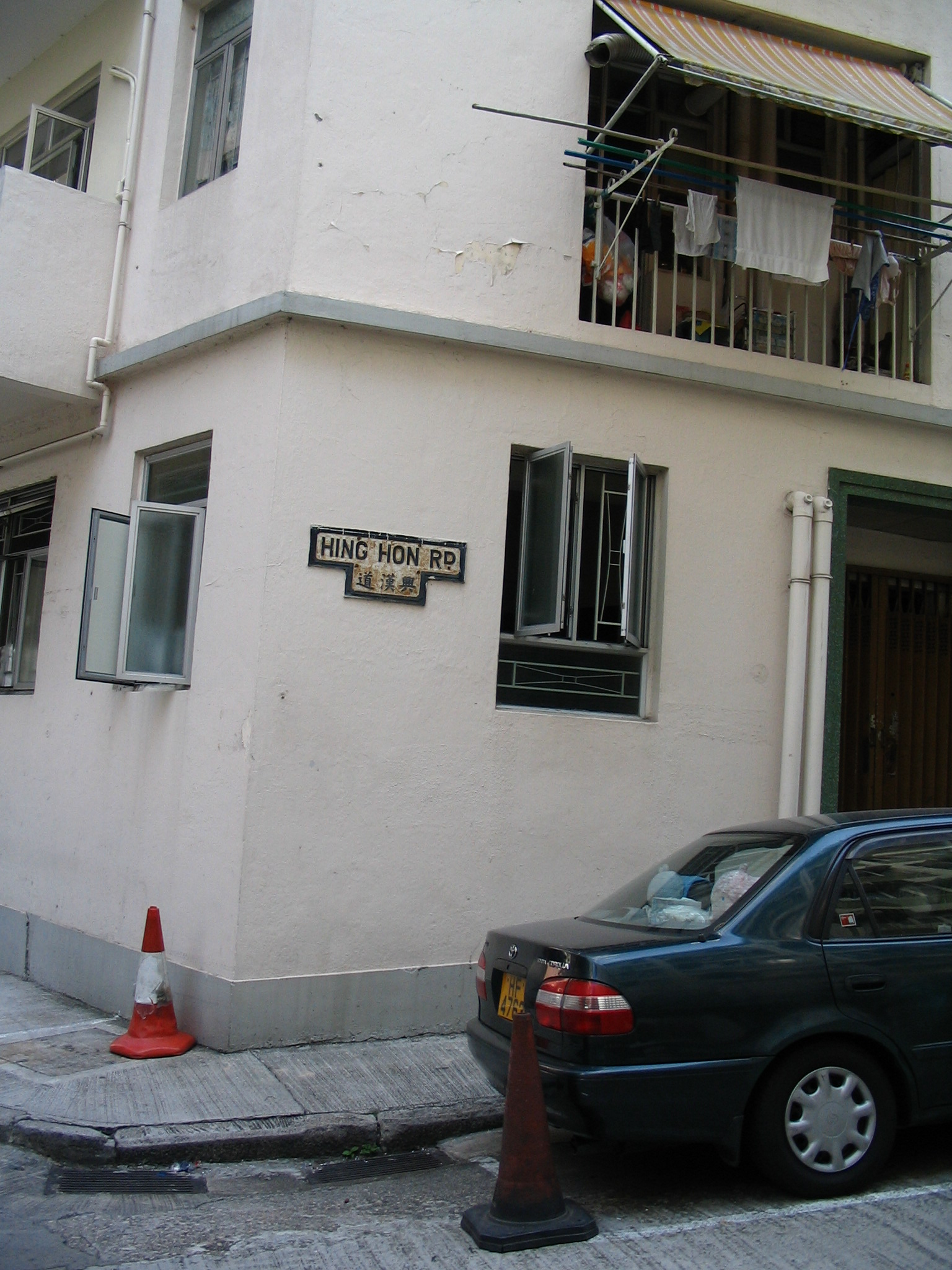
Hing Hon Road

Hing Hon Road (Chinese: 興漢道; Jyutping: hing1 hon3 dou6) is a private road in Sai Ying Pun, Hong Kong Island, branching off from Bonham Road opposite the East Gate of the University of Hong Kong.

== Overview ==
Hing Hon Road is a dead end road. The entrance is located opposite the East Gate of the University of Hong Kong on Bonham Road, at the gate outside the Wong Ming Him Hall (黃鳴謙堂) of St. Paul's College. From there, it goes down the mountain until it turns east opposite the side house at No. 27 (i.e. the Hing Hon Road Management Office). The end of Hing Hon Road is outside No. 18, which is the back entrance of the playground of King's College. There are several designated parking spaces on Hing Han Road.

There is a staircase on the side of the Hing Hon Road Management Office, leading to Pok Fu Lam Road, across from Water Street. The staircase was repaved with stone steps by the Engineering Team of the Home Affairs Department from 2 November to the end of December 2005. An iron gate was installed on the top. It is open to residents and pedestrians from 6 am to midnight every day, providing a shortcut for pedestrians to travel between Bonham Road and the University of Hong Kong, as well as between Sai Ying Pun and Shek Tong Tsui.

In the past, all the ground floor shops on Hing Hon Road were photocopying shops. There were two photocopying shops on the stairs leading to Pok Fu Lam Road. During lunch time on school days, a large number of students from St. Paul's College and the University of Hong Kong came here. As communities rebuild and e-learning becomes more popular, photocopying shops are closing.

== History ==
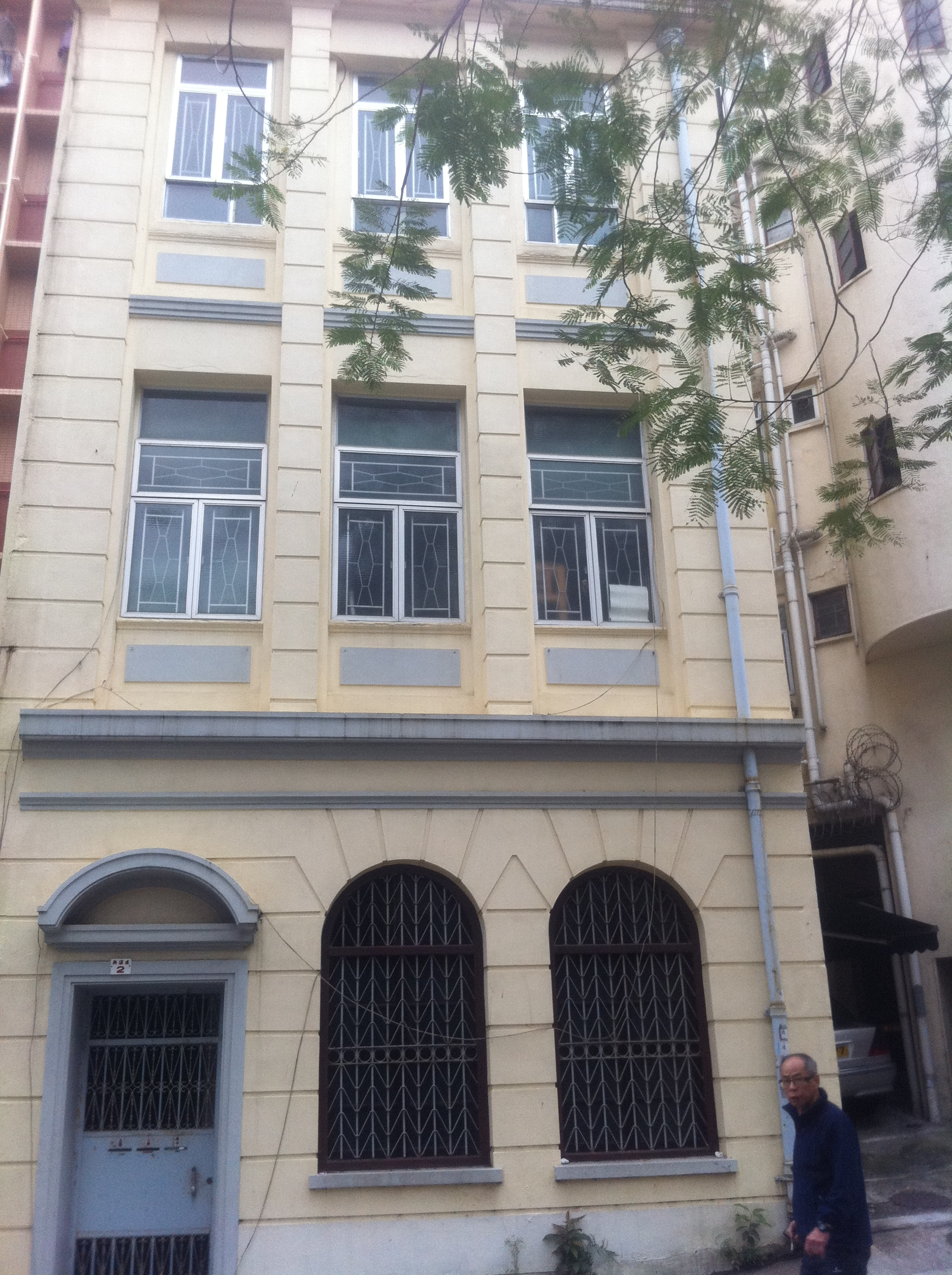
No. 2 Hing Hon Road

The history of Hing Han Road dates back to the 1860s, when a Chinese named Choy Akün purchased a large piece of land (I.L. 757) on 7 January 1862, with a government lease for 999 years, on which Hing Han Road was located.

There were several pre-war tenement buildings on Hing Hon Road. No. 2 and No. 19 were completed in 1916 and 1917 respectively. The former was a typical Chinese tenement house with a European-style façade reflecting Western influence on architecture in Hong Kong during the colonial era. The latter was proposed to be rated as a Grade 3 historic building in 2009. It is an Art Deco design with arches, window grilles and columns in Western classical architectural style.

However, no. 2 Hing Hon Road, which has stood for 98 years, was originally planned to be listed as a Grade II historic building, but it could not escape demolition recently because the owner raised objections to the conservation plan. No. 19 was originally planned to be listed as a Grade III historic building, but no agreement was reached between the owner and the government, the house was rebuilt into the current "The Summa" (高士台) in 2009.
