= Lok Sin Tong Leung Kau Kui College =

Public secondary school in Hong Kong

- 樂善堂梁銶琚書院
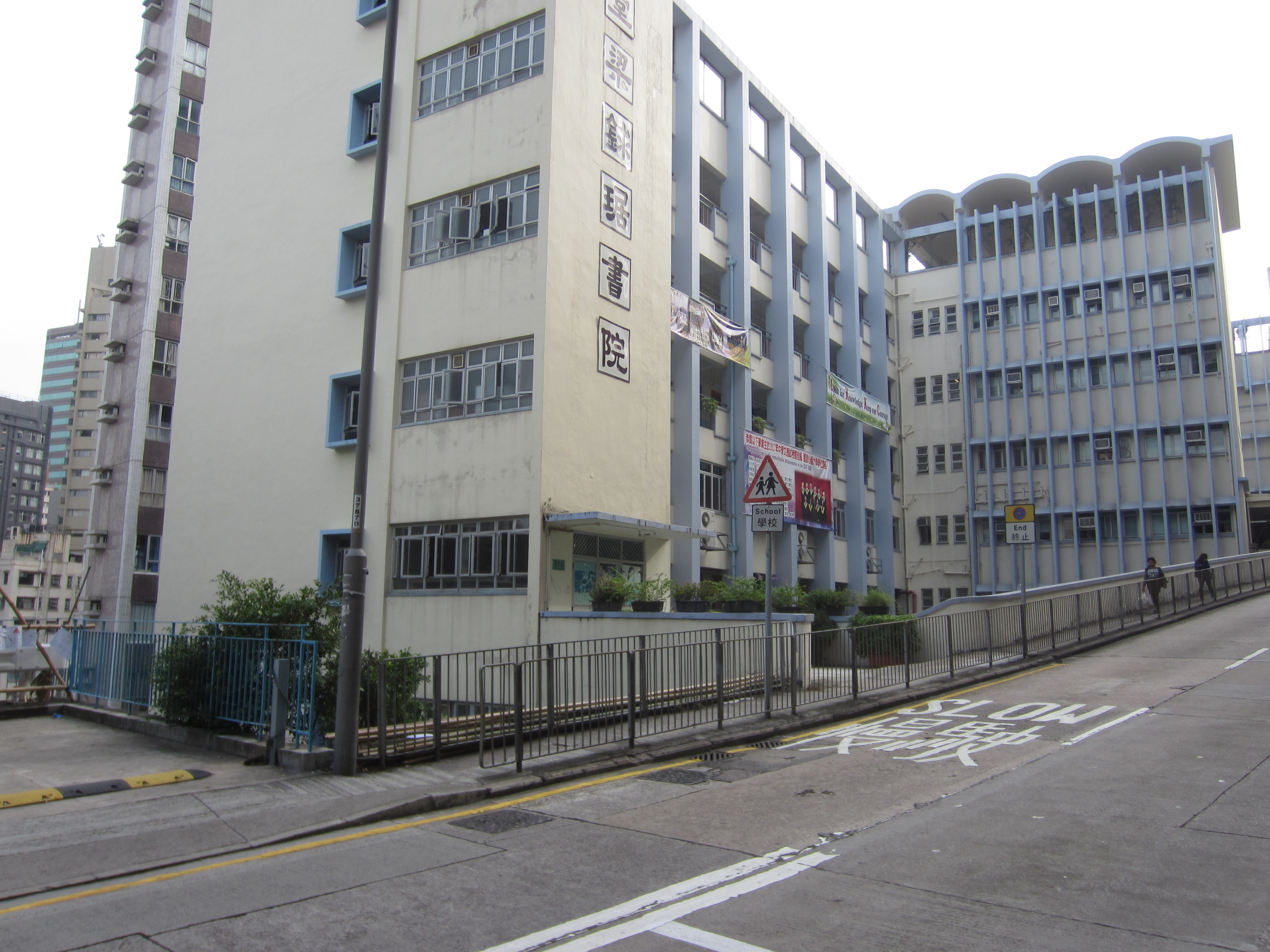

Location
- 26–28 Hospital Road, Sai Ying Pun; Hong Kong
- 22.284628°N 114.146117°E

Information
- Type: subsidised
- Motto: Benevolence, Love, Diligence, Fidelity
- Established: September 1991; 34 years ago
- Principal: Mr Chung Yiu Kee
- Faculty: 65
- Language: Cantonese
- Website: lstlkkc.edu.hk

Lok Sin Tong Leung Kau Kui College
- Traditional Chinese: 樂善堂梁銶琚書院
- Simplified Chinese: 乐善堂梁𨱇琚书院
Transcriptions
Standard Mandarin
- Hanyu Pinyin: Lè Shàn Táng Liáng Qiú Jū Shūyuàn
Yue: Cantonese
- Jyutping: lok6 sin6 tong4 loeng4 kau4 geoi1 syu1 jyun6*2

Lok Sin Tong Leung Kau Kui College (Chinese: 樂善堂梁銶琚書院, abbreviated as LSTLKKC) is a government-subsidised co-educational secondary school in Sai Ying Pun, Hong Kong. It is affiliated with Lok Sin Tong and sponsored by philanthropist Leung Kau-kui.

Chinese serves as the primary medium-of-instruction at Lok Sin Tong Leung Kau Kui College, with the exception of Mathematics and Sciences during the early years of secondary education.

== Development ==
=== Before 2000 ===
Established in September 1991, the school was initially known as Lok Sin Tong College and was situated on Hill Road, Sai Ying Pun. LSTLKKC is situated among traditionally prestigious schools within the Central and Western District. The school faced several difficulties in the early years of its establishment, such as a shortage of school facilities, due to a rapid increase in enrollment numbers. The situation improved in the years after. In 1993, it renamed to Lok Sin Tong Leung Kau Kui College in recognition of the contribution of HK$1.5 million by businessman and philanthropist Dr Leung Kau-kui which funded the school construction. The current premises of the institution at Hospital Road, Sai Ying Pun were previously occupied by several other educational establishments, including Helen Liang Memorial Secondary School, Yu To Sang Memorial Secondary School, and Kennedy Town Government Secondary School.

In 1997, the school underwent a major educational reform with about thirty changes in teaching and administration, leading to a massive increase in the passing rate of Hong Kong Certificate of Education Examination for 148% within three years. In a bid to remain abreast with the standards of the nearby prestigious EMI schools, LSTLKKC continued with the educational reforms in areas such as subject structure, course content, teaching methods, and course preparation.

=== After 2000 ===
From 2000 onward, a LSTLKKC student achieved a triple-A in the Hong Kong Advanced Level Examination. LSTLKKC also allowed students with excellent performance to switch from science stream to business at Form Six, which attracted students from traditionally prestigious schools such as Sacred Heart Canossian College, St. Louis School, and St. Stephen's Girls' College. The interaction between transfer students and elite students from LSTLKKC created a conducive learning environment that improved the school's branding.

As one of the only two CMI (Chinese Medium-of-Instruction) schools in Central and Western District, LSTLKKC took in immigrant students who find it difficult to enter EMI schools. In 2000, LSTLKKC gradually began rising in the banding system, partly due to lower standards in traditionally prestigious schools in the Western District and educational reforms, thereby absorbing more students from other schools. Since 2010, a number of students from the school have been awarded Hong Kong Island Outstanding Students Award. As student enrollment increases, the school has introduced additional programmes in the academic year 2015–2016 with English as a medium of instruction, in order to improve the prospects of their graduates. In 2020, LSTLKKC is currently ranked at banding 3A-2C and is rated 269-303 out of 446 schools in Hong Kong. The university acceptance rate of LSTLKKC graduates is about 13%.

The school intranet was hacked in 2022 by a self-claimed Form One student, who demanded relaxing rules on mobile phones and slammed the political stance of the school management in an email sent to all staff and students through a teacher's account. The hacker apologised after the school reported the hacking to the police.

== Notable alumni ==
- Wong Shun Hei (Owner of Transnational Transportation Company)
- Wut Ka Wa (Hong Kong Outstanding Mechanical Engineer)
- Lee Shiu Hong (Hong Kong Outstanding Manufacturing Engineer)
