= Bonham Road =

Main road in Mid-Levels West, Hong Kong

Coordinates: 22.2842°N 114.1424°E

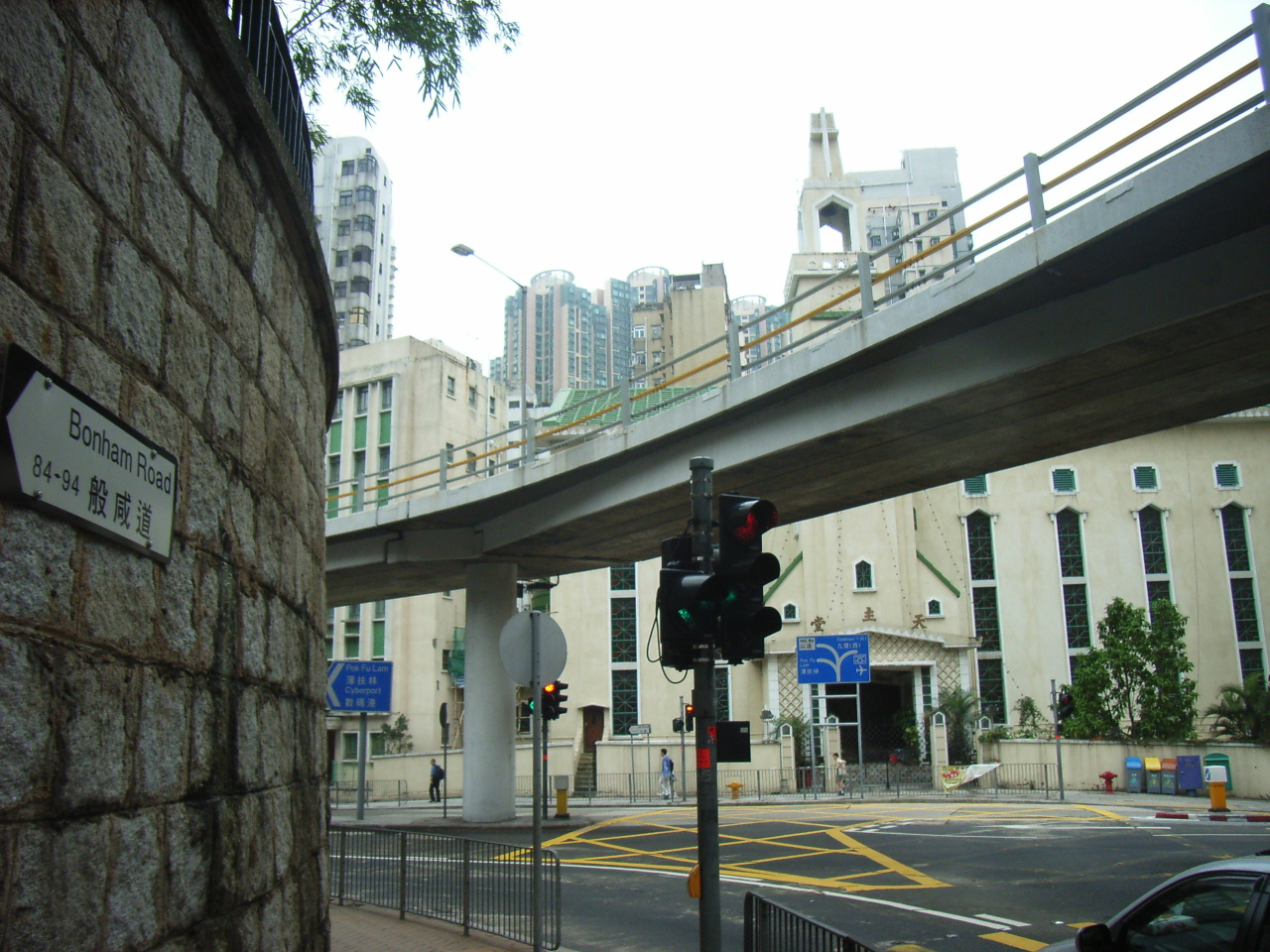
- View of Bonham Road facing St. Anthony's Church
- Interactive map of Bonham Road
- Length: 1.3 km (0.81 mi)
- Area: Sai Ying Pun/Mid-Levels
- West end: Pok Fu Lam Road, Hill Road
- East end: Caine Road

Bonham Road
- Chinese: 般咸道 般含道
Transcriptions
Standard Mandarin
- Hanyu Pinyin: Bānxián Dào
Yue: Cantonese
- Yale Romanization: Būn hàahm douh
- Jyutping: Bun1 haam4 dou6

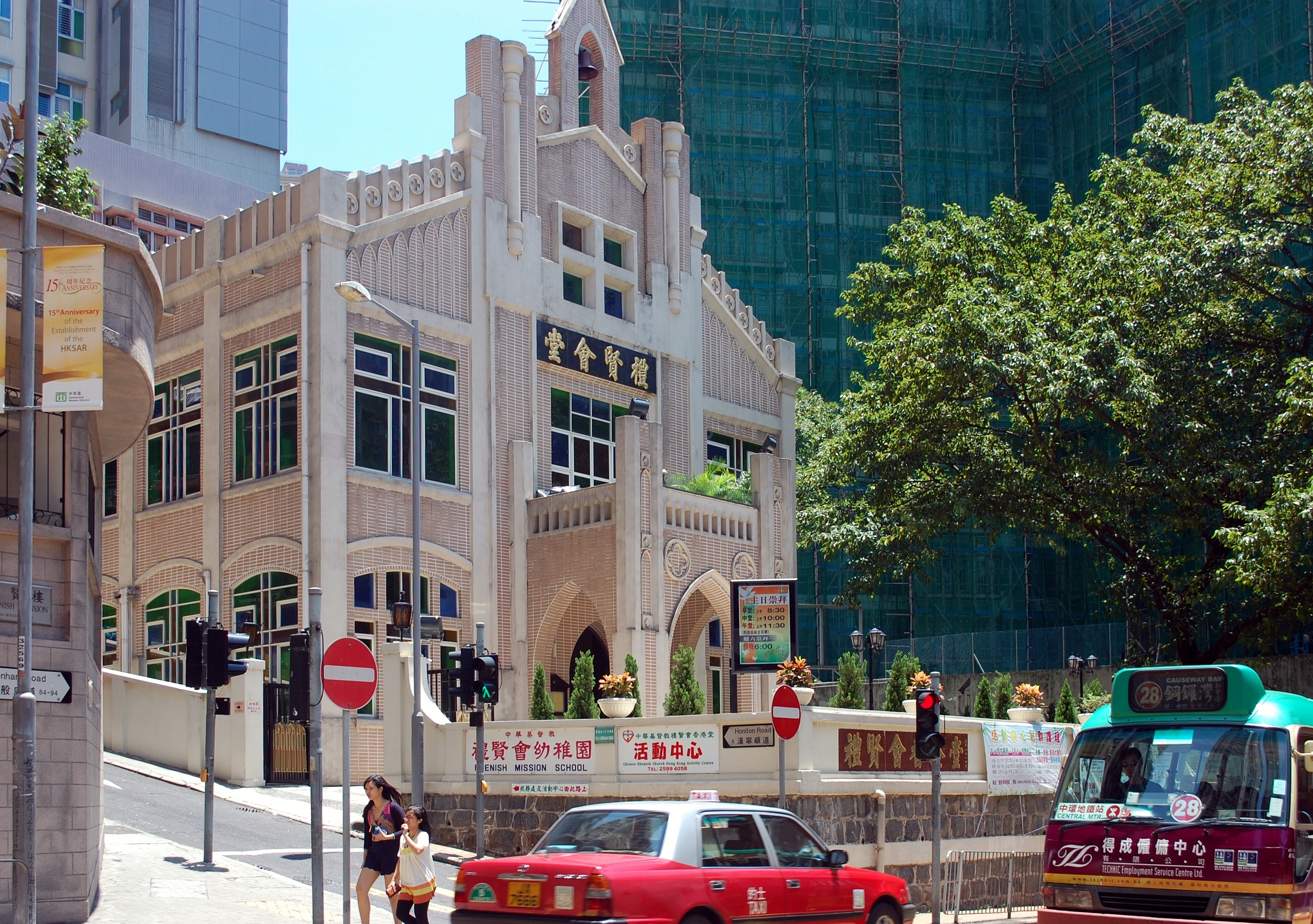
The Chinese Rhenish Church along Bonham Road

Bonham Road (Chinese: 般咸道; Jyutping: bun1 haam4 dou6) is a main road in Mid-Levels West, Hong Kong, running in a mainly east-west direction. The road connects Pok Fu Lam Road in the west, near the University of Hong Kong, and Caine Road in the east, at the junction with Hospital Road and Seymour Road. It is named after Sir George Bonham, the third Governor of Hong Kong. It was renamed Nishi-Taisho Dori (西大正通) during the Japanese occupation of Hong Kong.

== Features ==
Several historical buildings are located on the road, including the Chinese Rhenish Church (established in the 19th century), the Fung Ping Shan Building, the Hung Hing Ying Building, and the Main Building of the University of Hong Kong. There are also a few well known schools located on the road, including: King's College, St. Paul's College, St. Stephen's Girls' College, Bonham Road Government Primary School, and St. Clare's Primary School.

== Bonham Road Flyover ==
Bonham Road Flyover is a one-way, single-lane flyover allowing vehicles travelling north on Pok Fu Lam Road to turn east onto Bonham Road. It was completed in 1973.

== Landmarks ==
=== Community Facilities ===
- Sai Ying Pun Community Complex

=== Transport ===
- MTR Sai Ying Pun station

=== Education ===
- University of Hong Kong
- St. Stephen's Girls' College
- King's College, Hong Kong
- St. Paul's College, Hong Kong
- St. Stephen's Church College
- Bonham Road Government Primary School
- St. Claire's Primary School

=== Religious ===
- Chinese Rehinish Church (Hong Kong)
- Hop Yat Church (Hong Kong)
- St. Anthony's Church (Hong Kong)

=== Nature ===
- Stone wall trees

=== Military ===
- Bonham Tower Barracks – Western Barracks of the Hong Kong Garrison; located at 88 Bonham Road

== Intersecting roads ==
Listed from West to East:

- Pok Fu Lam Road
- Hill Road
- Hing Hon Road (Private Road)
- Western Street
- Honiton Road
- Centre Street (pedestrianised)
- Park Road (Hong Kong)
- Breezy Path
- Hospital Road
- Seymour Road (Hong Kong)
- Caine Road

== See also ==
- List of streets and roads in Hong Kong
- High Street, Hong Kong
- Bonham Strand
