= Stone wall trees in Hong Kong =

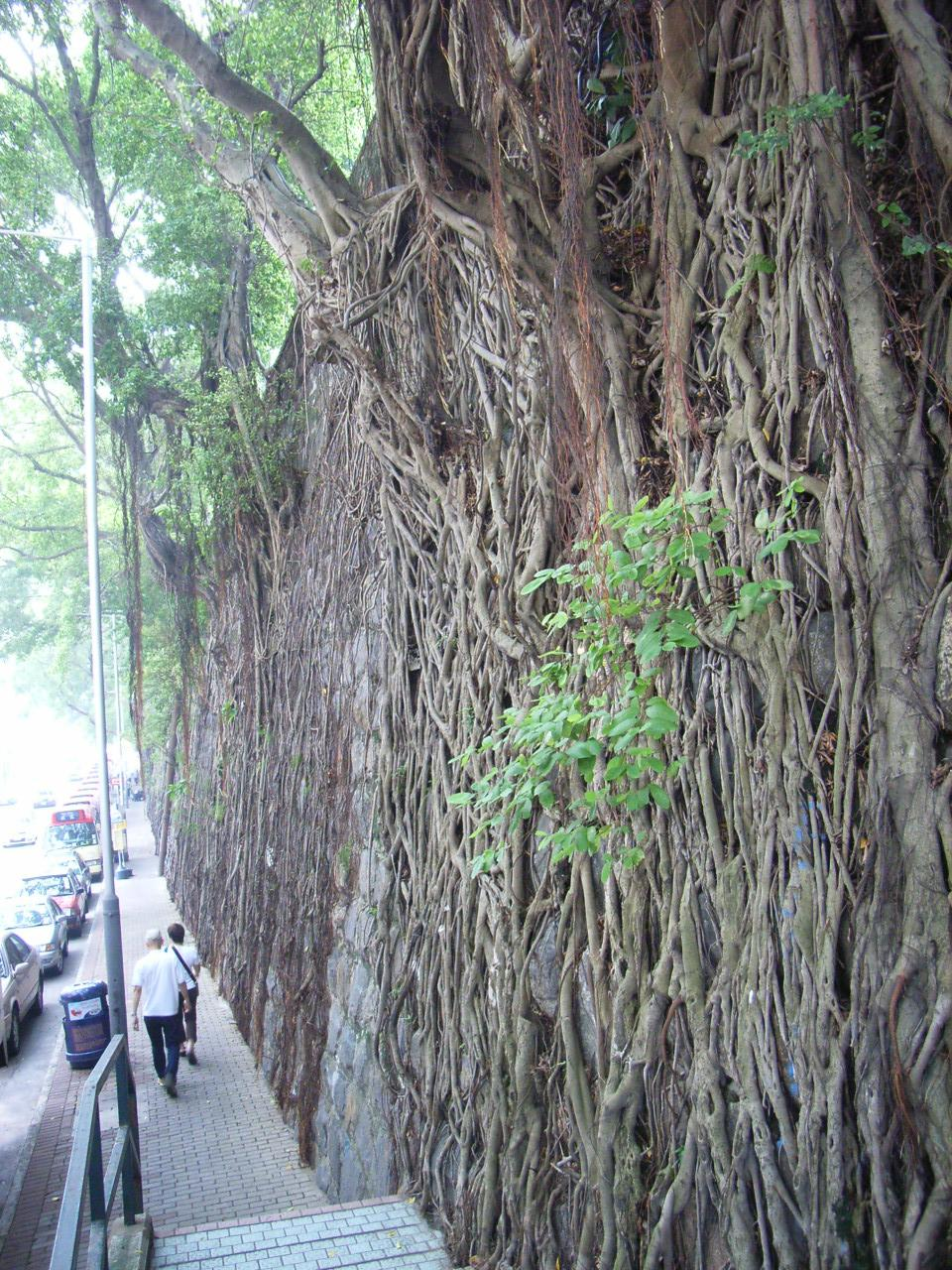
Forbes Street, Kennedy Town, Hong Kong

Masonry wall trees refer to trees grown from openings in masonry stone retaining walls. In alleviating hazards from landslides, many slopes adjacent to main roads and developments on Hong Kong Island in Hong Kong needed to be secured. Between the 19th century and World War II, the Hong Kong Government and other contractors constructed masonry stone walls to prevent these hazards. Not until the last two decades have slopes been stabilised through cementing. In early constructed walls, opened joints between stones allowed strong species like banyans to sprout. Traffic and human activities carry on despite the growth of these plants, which further stabilise the retaining walls they are growing on. As time goes by, sprouts mature into fully developed stone wall trees.

== Distribution ==
As of today, 1275 stone wall trees are situated on 504 masonry stone retaining walls, with 110 walls in the Central and Western District, where most walls remain, with many others in Wan Chai District. A majority of these trees have lived for over a century.

According to the Conservancy Association, some notable trees are located at:

=== Hong Kong Island ===
The largest tree is an over-a-century-old Chinese banyan (Ficus microcarpa), located in Forbes Street, near Forbes Street Playground. Another tree on Bonham Road near Centre Street had a height of around 20 metres, and was the tallest in the city, however it fell on 22 July 2015 in a storm.

==== Central and Western District ====
===== Kennedy Town =====
- Forbes Street

===== Mid-Levels =====
- Hollywood Road (Former police quarters)
- Bonham Road near Centre Street (All trees are now removed by the government in view of Typhoon Soudelor, which actually didn't have any impact to Hong Kong according to its route)
- Rose Lane
- Intersection of Bonham Road and High Street
- Hospital Road near Bonham Road
- Opposite of 84 Robinson Road
- St. Stephen's Lane
- King George V Memorial Park

==== Wan Chai District ====
- Stubbs Road near Kennedy Road
- Ship Street (near Nam Koo Terrace)

=== Kowloon ===
==== Yau Tsim Mong District ====
- Adjacent to aviary pond in Kowloon Park

==== Sham Shui Po District ====
Lung Chu Street Nullah

In Lung Chu Street Nullah, there are about 20 wall trees. More than 12 wall trees exist at the site and most of them are Chinese banyan and common red-stem fig. All of them are mature trees with a height between 3 and 11 metres high. The special one is those common red-stem fig. It is a unique phenomenon for those particular wall trees since the majority of wall trees in Hong Kong are Chinese banyan. It is the only site in Hong Kong, which have a dozen common red-stem fig trees in one location, which its buttress root adapted to the condition of the masonry walls. The nullah, therefore, is a scene with special scientific value for further study.

Comparing the trees planted in the park next to the nullah, the trees in the nullah are rich in biodiversity. Various kinds of birds could be found on those trees along the nullah, for example, yellow wagtail and white wagtail etc.

Besides, the trees around nullah formed a green canopy and functioned as a green lung for the community. For all those years, the trees benefited the community, for example, by minimizing the heat island effect.

Lai Chi Kok Hospital HACare Home There is also a Chinese banyan growing on the masonry wall next to Lai Chi Kok hospital, HACare Home.

== Ecological value ==
In the beginning, greenery of the site was not taken into consideration during road constructions. Roads built at that time were often narrow and had no space for adding canopy by simply planting trees. Trees naturally emerged from the walls taking up no additional space at ground level, and shield the pathways from heat during the summer.

Tall wall trees, especially banyans, also improve air quality by filtering particulates and blocking heat emitted from automobiles and building-wide air conditioning systems, that would otherwise be trapped between skyscrapers, generating air pollution.

Biodiversity is maintained through these trees by providing habitats for birds and various insects.

The integrity of the retaining wall may be enhanced or compromised, depending on the size of the tree that develops, the disposition of its roots and to what extent the roots have been able to penetrate through the wall.

== Cultural value ==
Stone wall trees in Hong Kong have become a part of the landscape in communities, as most of them have existed since before World War II. The artistic shapes and endurance of these trees won appreciation from nearby residents, which transform into an indispensable part of the collective memories of the community.

Some senior residents believe that the trees can improve Feng Shui and bring positive prospects towards the neighbourhood.

Wall trees also create a beneficial environment that enables higher property prices around the trees compared to other premises in the area.

== Additional conservations ==
- Ding Tomb among the Ming Dynasty Tombs, Beijing
- Ming Dynasty walls in Yuexiu Park, Guangzhou

== See also ==
- Conservancy Association
