= St. Stephen's Church College =

Secondary school in Hong Kong

Coordinates: 22°17′06″N 114°08′18″E

St. Stephen's Church College (Chinese: 聖士提反堂中學) is a secondary school attached to the Anglican St Stephen's Church in Hong Kong, located between Bonham Road and Pok Fu Lam Road in Sai Ying Pun. The school's total enrollment in the academic year 2009-2010 was approximately 1,000, in 24 classes of two streams (arts and science), across six forms/grades.

== Notable alumni ==
- Wong, Vincent (王浩信), Hong Kong-based Cantopop singer and actor

== See also ==
- St Stephen's College (Hong Kong) (聖公會聖士提反書院)
- St. Stephen's Girls' College (聖公會聖士提反女子中學)
