= Lok Sin Tong Leung Chik Wai Memorial School =

Coordinates: 22.3504°N 114.0978°E

- 樂善堂梁植偉紀念中學

Location
- Cheung Hong Estate Phase 1 Hong Kong; China

Information
- Type: Aided Coeducational Secondary School
- Established: 8 April 1986; 39 years ago
- School district: Kwai Tsing
- Teaching staff: 66
- Enrollment: 1061

Lok Sin Tong Leung Chik Wai Memorial School (Chinese: 樂善堂梁植偉紀念中學) is a secondary school on Tsing Yi Island in Hong Kong. Situated within the fifth phase of Cheung Hong Estate near Liu To, the school was founded on 8 April 1986 by Lok Sin Tong, a charity based in Kowloon. It was the fourth secondary school on the island.
