= Lok Sin Tong =

- Traditional Chinese: 九龍樂善堂
- Simplified Chinese: 九龙乐善堂
Transcriptions
Standard Mandarin
- Hanyu Pinyin: Jiǔlóng Lèshàn Táng
Yue: Cantonese
- Jyutping: gau2 lung4 lok6 sin6 tong4

The Lok Sin Tong Benevolent Society, Kowloon (Chinese: 九龍樂善堂), or Lok Sin Tong (樂善堂), is charity organisation in Hong Kong since 1880.

== History ==
In the mid-19th century, there was a market outside Kowloon Walled City. To maintain a fair trade, a group of local Chinese set up a common scale and collected service charges from users for charity services such as free medical consultation and burial services. In 1880, the Lok Sin Tong Benevolent Society, Kowloon, was officially registered as a charity organisation.

In the late 19th century, with the outbreak of plague, the society set up a free graveyard at Fei Ngo Shan to bury the poor dead. In 1927, it founded a first free school for girls. Since then its service has expanded into education, social welfare and medical care. It is a diversified social organization.

In 2016, Lok Sin Tong invited Julian Chan and Schumann to write a song called "Benevolence" to celebrate the 136th anniversary.

== Executive Committee Members ==
1. Ms. Lee Pui Ah (Chairlady)

=== Vice-chairpersons ===
1. Ms. Wan Man Wai
2. Mr. Tung Fong Ngai
3. Ms. Wong Ying Ying
4. Mr. Tung Chi Fung

== Contribution ==
The table shows the public facilities which are founded by Lok Sin Tong.

=== Schools ===
Name	Category	Other information
Lok Sin Tong Lee Yin Yee Kindergarten	Kindergarten	
Lok Sin Tong Cheung Yip Mou Ching Kindergarten	Kindergarten	
Lok Sin Tong Tang Tak Lim Kindergarten	Kindergarten	
Lok Sin Tong Ku Lee Kwok Sin Kindergarten	Kindergarten	
Lok Sin Tong Man Ng Wing Yee Kindergarten	Kindergarten	
Lok Sin Tong Stephen Leung Kindergarten	Kindergarten	
Lok Sin Tong Leung Kau Kui Primary School	Primary	
Lok Sin Tong Leung Kau Kui Primary School (Branch)	Primary	
Lok Sin Tong Leung Wong Wai Fong Memorial School	Primary	
Lok Sin Tong Lau Tak Primary School	Primary	
Lok Sin Tong Yeung Chung Ming Primary School	Primary	
Lok Sin Tong Leung Kau Kui College	Secondary	
Lok Sin Tong Leung Chik Wai Memorial School	Secondary	
Lok Sin Tong Young Ko Hsiao Lin Secondary School	Secondary	
Lok Sin Tong Wong Chung Ming Secondary School	Secondary	
Lok Sin Tong Yu Kan Hing Secondary School	Secondary	
Lok Sin Tong Leung Kau Kui College	Secondary	

==== Former ====
Name	Location	Date of closure	Current status	Ref.
Lok Sin Tong Primary School	Lung Kong Road, Kowloon City	c. August 2019	It is a part of Transitional Housing Project at "LST Housing". Date of commencement of works is January 2020 and it was completed in August 2020.	

=== Medical service ===
Name	Co-founder	Ref.
Respite centre for recovering elderly COVID-19 patients	St. Paul's Hospital	
Lok Sin Tong Chan Kwong Hing Memorial Primary Health Centre		
Lok Sin Tong Mr. & Mrs. Lee Yin Yee Medical Centre
Lok Sin Tong EnGenius Dental Clinic
Lok Sin Tong Lee Sy Ang Long Chinese Medicine Clinic
