= Sai Ying Pun =

Area of Western District, Hong Kong

Sai Ying Pun 西營盤
- Neighbourhood
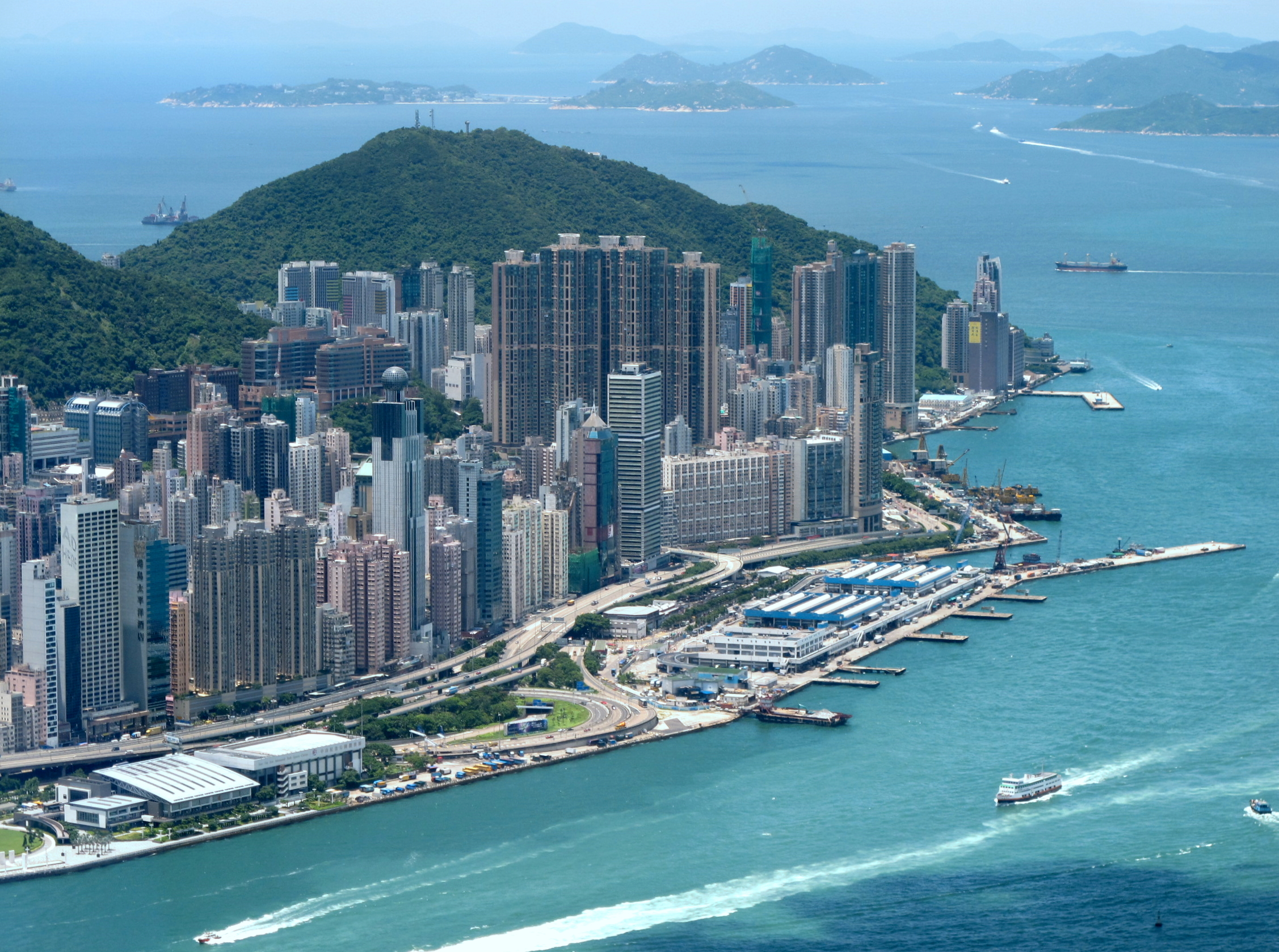
- Sai Ying Pun (on the left hand side of the image)
- Interactive map of Sai Ying Pun
- Coordinates: 22.28591°N 114.14283°E
- SAR: Hong Kong
- Area: Hong Kong Island
- District: Western District

Sai Ying Pun
- Traditional Chinese: 西營盤
- Simplified Chinese: 西营盘
- Literal meaning: Western barracks
Transcriptions
Standard Mandarin
- Hanyu Pinyin: Xīyíngpán
Yue: Cantonese
- Yale Romanization: Sāi yìhng pùhn
- Jyutping: Sai1 jing4 pun4
- IPA: [sɐ́i jɪ̏ŋ pʰȕːn]

Sai Ying Pun is an area in Sai Wan, on Hong Kong Island, in Hong Kong. It is administratively part of the Central and Western District.

== Location ==
Sai Ying Pun is built on the steeply sloping lower slopes of Victoria Peak and also on the western reclamation. The areas of Shek Tong Tsui and Kennedy Town are located to the west, Sheung Wan and Tai Ping Shan are to the east, and the Mid-Levels is higher up the hill to the south. Victoria Harbour is to the north.

While the boundaries are not de jure drawn, they are nevertheless de facto defined by Whitty Street in the west and Tung Wah Hospital in the east. The HKU MTR station exit B1 straddles the boundary between Shek Tong Tsui and Sai Ying Pun. Good Luck Mansion and The Kadoorie Biological Sciences Building are in Shek Tong Tsui, while Saint Anthony's Church, Pao Siu Loong Building, and the Main Building are in Sai Ying Pun.

The eastern boundary is blurry. Lok Sin Tong Leung Kau Kui College is in Sai Ying Pun while Tung Wah Hospital is in Sheung Wan. The section of Queens Road West from Medal Court to Hollywood Road marks part of the boundary. Elsewhere, the location of the border is unknown. On a map, Sai Ying Pun can be distinguished from Sheung Wan because it is left of the street grid of the Tai Ping Shan neighbourhood.

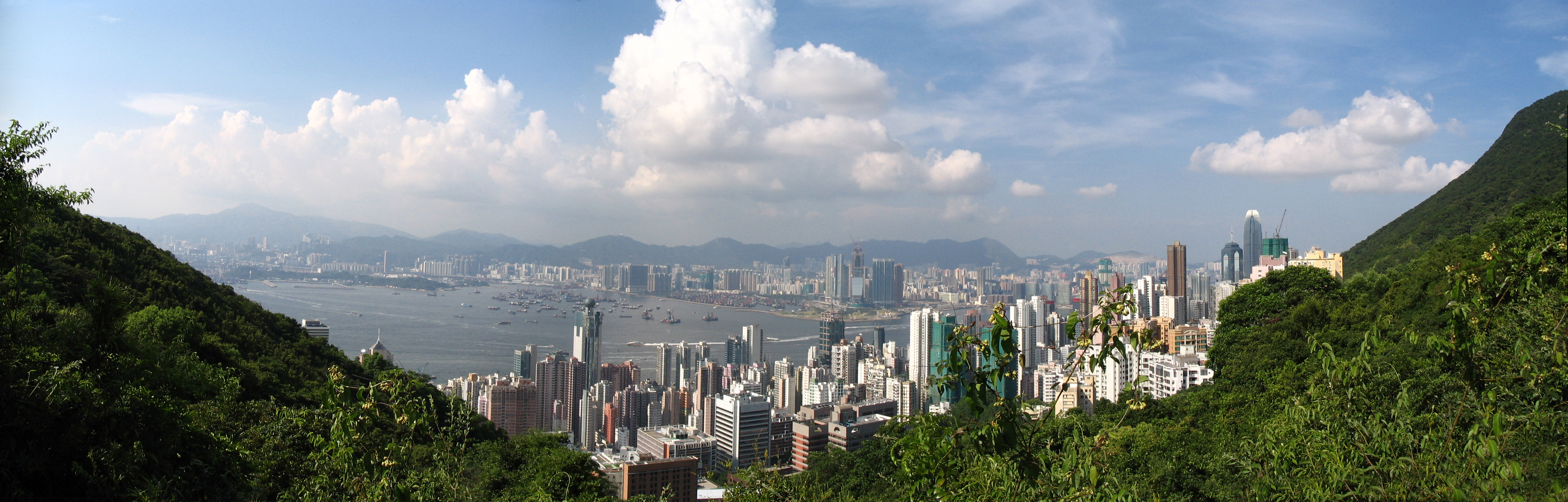
Sai Ying Pun, viewed from Hatton Road, Lung Fu Shan Country Park. West Kowloon (across Victoria Harbour), Sheung Wan and Central can also be seen. The two slopes on the both sides belongs to Lung Fu Shan and Victoria Peak respectively.

=== Geology ===
Sai Ying Pun is built on top of Hong Kong granite. The granite was formed in the Upper Jurassic Period and is from the last phase of intrusions in the Hong Kong area. The granite is found over most of the north and centre of Hong Kong Island, and also Kowloon. The flat parts of Sai Ying Pun near the harbour are reclaimed land, built from landfill.

== History ==
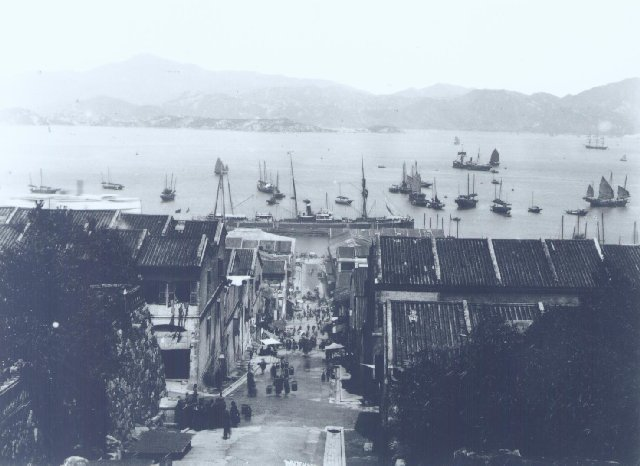
1890 Eastern Street

On 26 January 1841 (the 21st year of Emperor Daoguang's reign), the British army landed in Sai Ying Pun, which is now Possession Street (水坑口街), and Sai Ying Pun was not as prosperous as it is today. In May of that year, according to the population census published in the Hong Kong Gazette, there were approximately 7,450 people in Sai Ying Pun.

Sai Ying Pun, which developed in the 1850s, is a microcosm of Hong Kong history. Due to its location by the sea and steep mountains, the Hong Kong government chose Sai Ying Pun as the British military camp for the Bengal Volunteers from India, which had 800 Indian soldiers. The camp was located on the hillside of present-day Water Street.

In 1842, Canton Press (廣州周報) reported on the construction plan of Hong Kong: "About four miles from west to east along the northern bay, to the east is the peninsula where the Jardine Matheson Company's buildings are located, to the west is the military camp where the Bengal Volunteers are stationed, and a road connects the two east and west outposts." The Bengal Volunteers military camp referred to here is Sai Ying Pun (lit. the Western Military camp).

Queen's Road was the first road built in the area. It meandered around the camp structures and extended along the north coast of Hong Kong Island.

Sai Ying Pun was settled as Chinese immigrants moved into Hong Kong and built to the west of Tai Ping Shan. Europeans were assigned areas above High Street where Chinese were excluded from living.

In the early 1880s, sewerage was installed into the area, with the main flow coming down Centre Street. Streets were also macadamised or concreted at this time.

Around 1882, Battery Road was renamed Bonham Road.

From 1884 to 1887, many brothels were declared by the Government to be unlicensed and closed down. These were mainly in First, Second and Third Street, but also in Sheung Fung Lane, Ui On Lane and Centre Street.

In 1894, an epidemic of bubonic plague struck and afflicted Sai Ying Pun residents. It was not initially as bad as in neighbouring Tai Ping Shan, which was abandoned and demolished to improve hygiene. However, Sheung Fung Lane residents were almost wiped out. Government reports called this area the number IX health district and went into great detail about the buildings where the disease occurred. In 1896, there were 115 cases, in 1898, 153 cases, in 1899, 263 cases, in 1900 98 cases, in 1904 there were 149 cases with 144 dying, and 55 cases in 1905. The great majority of infections in this district resulted in death.

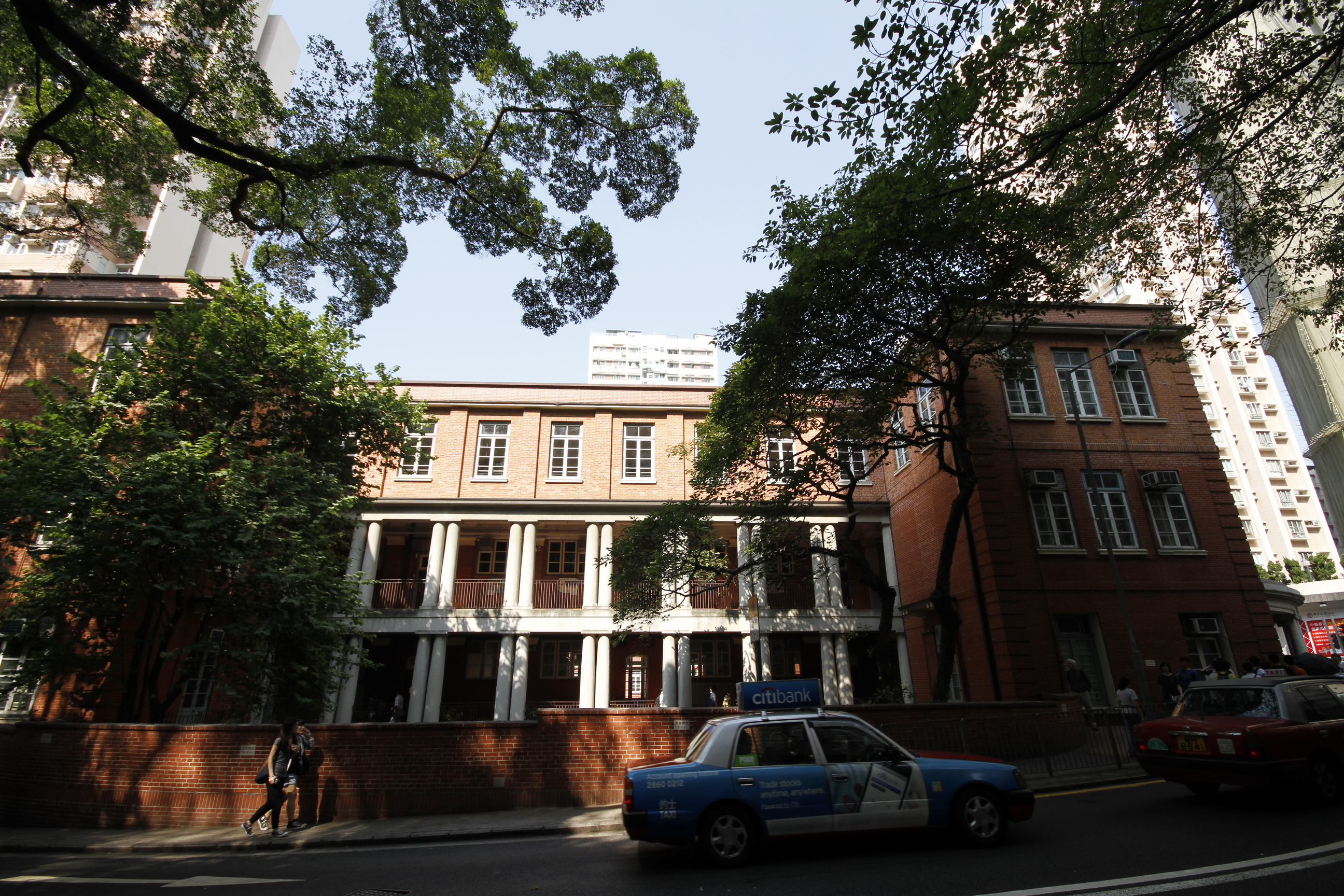
King's College, Hong Kong, built in 1926

In 1902, number 10 and 12 Second Street partially collapsed killing four people and injuring six. An additional storey had been added to number 10 at the beginning of 1901. It fell on number 12 and caused it to collapse as well. The extension had been designed by architects Denison and Ram. Also in 1902, a cookhouse at 56 First Street collapsed, one person was killed.

In 1899, there were 1017 houses and a population estimate of 24,800. Most houses in Des Voeux Road and First Street were three stories, and in Second and Third Street they were two stories. In 1904 population was 24,900 and average occupancy per floor of each house was 8.9. In 1905, the population was 25083.

In 1903, most houses were made from soft blue bricks, they had basements, and retaining walls at the front and back due to the steep slope.

In the early 1900s, there was a Berlin Foundling House in High Street, a Sailors Home, and a Lunatic Asylum.

== Main streets ==
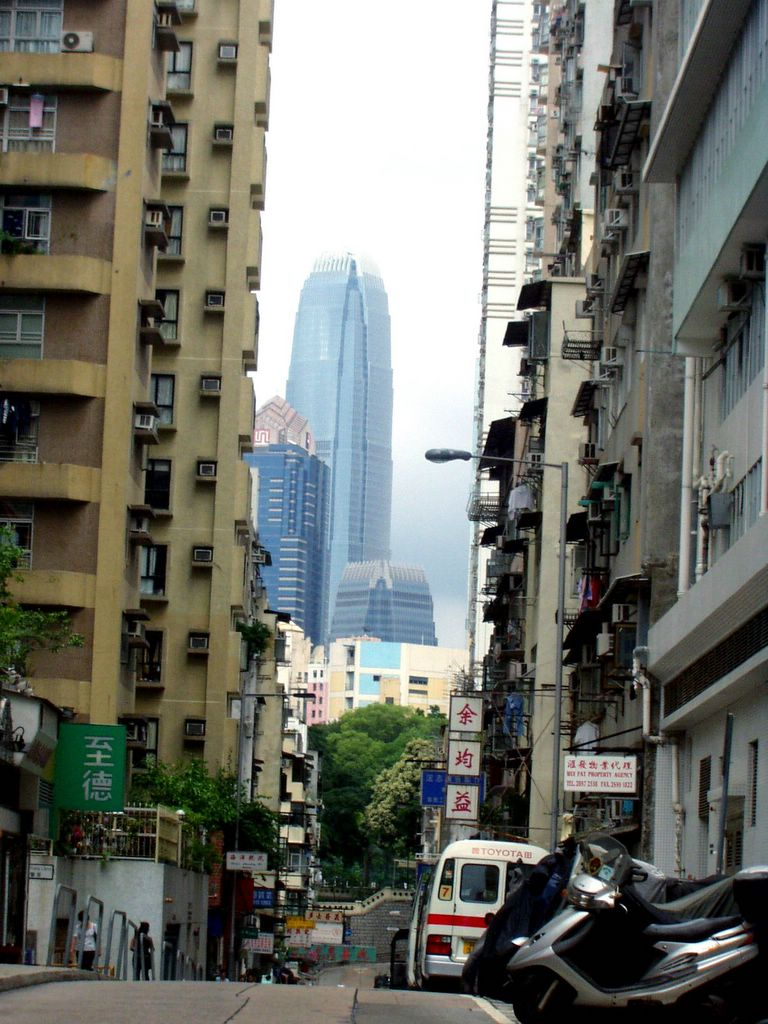
Third Street, in Sai Ying Pun, viewing IFC2 in Central

- Bonham Road
- Centre Street
- Connaught Road West
- Des Voeux Road West
- Eastern Street
- First Street
- High Street
- Pok Fu Lam Road
- Queen's Road West
- Second Street
- Third Street
- Western Street
- Whitty Street

== Public facilities ==
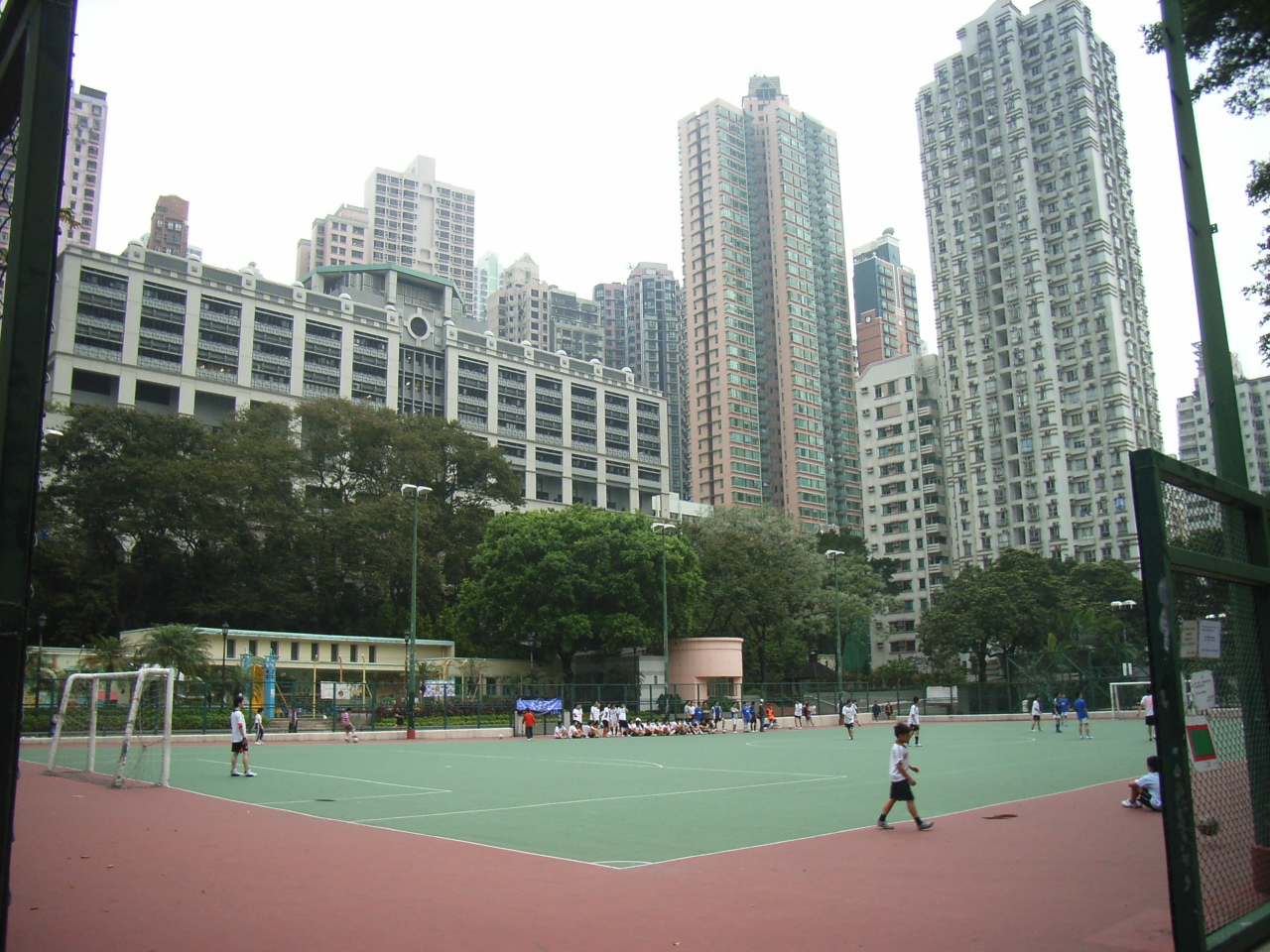
King George V Memorial Park, Sai Ying Pun

- Western District Community Centre (built 1922 as Tsan Yuk Hospital)
- King George V Memorial Park, Hong Kong
- Prince Philip Dental Hospital
- Sun Yat Sen Memorial Park
- Sai Ying Pun Community Complex
- Sai Ying Pun Market

== Education ==
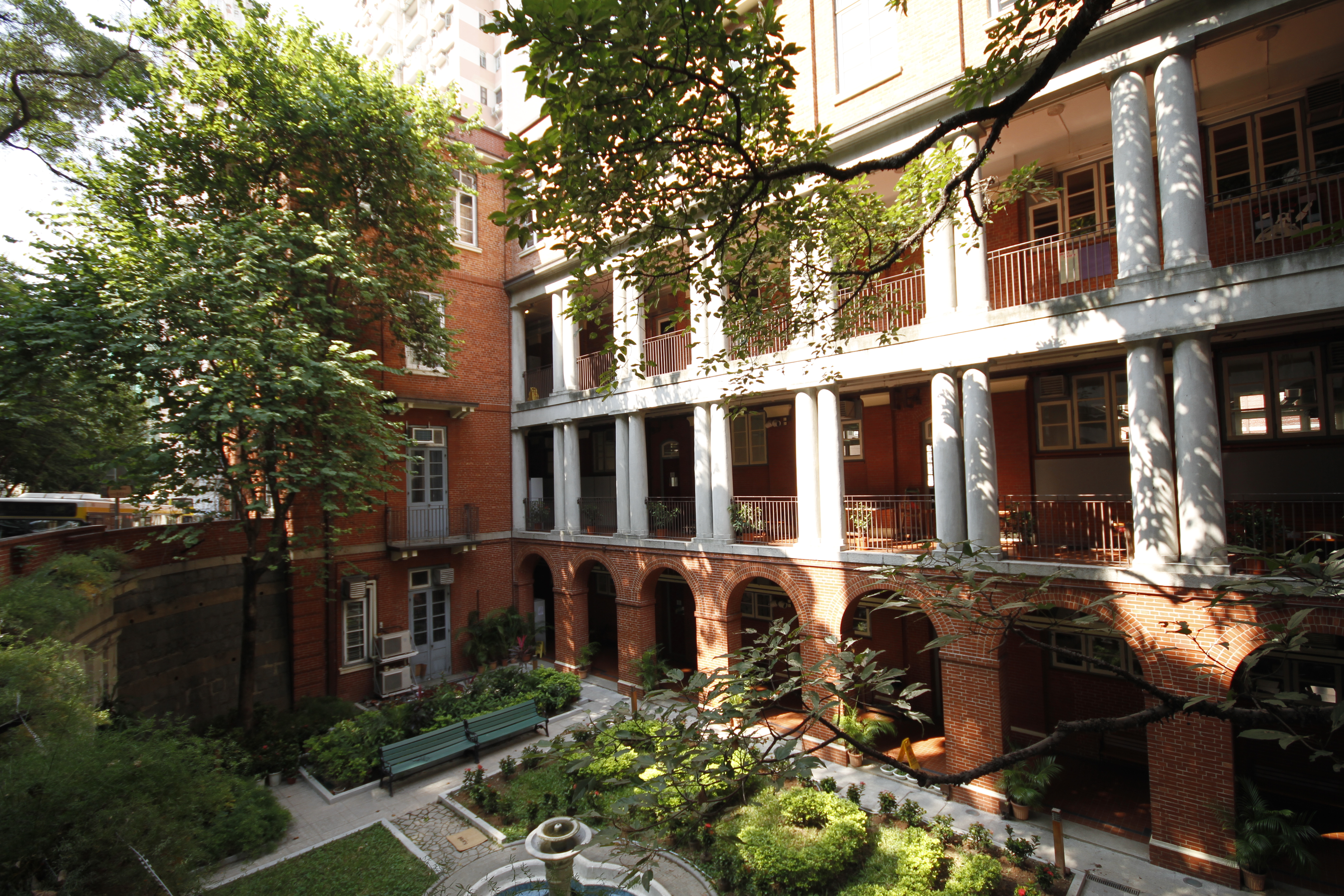
King's College, Hong Kong

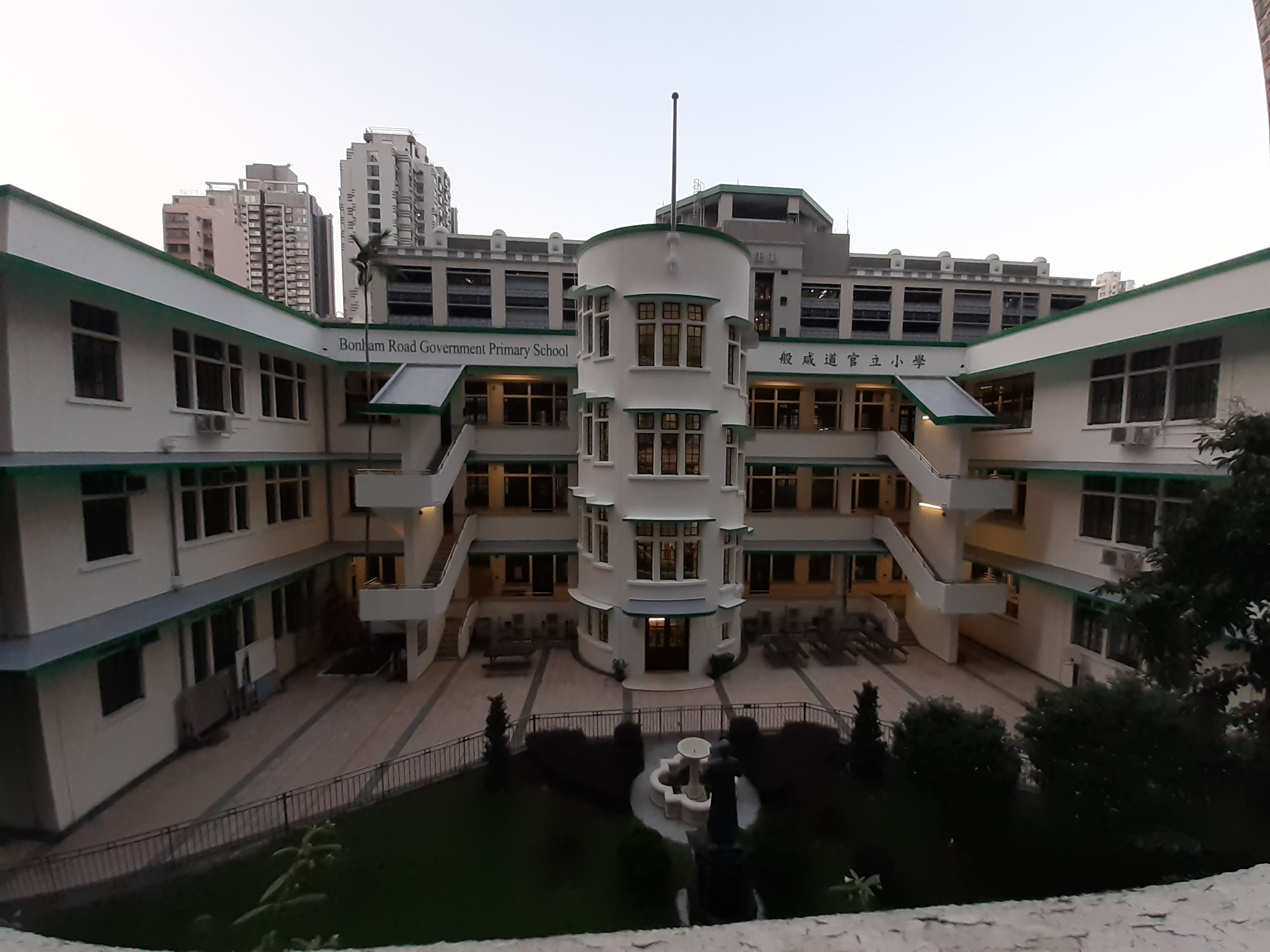
Bonham Road Government Primary School

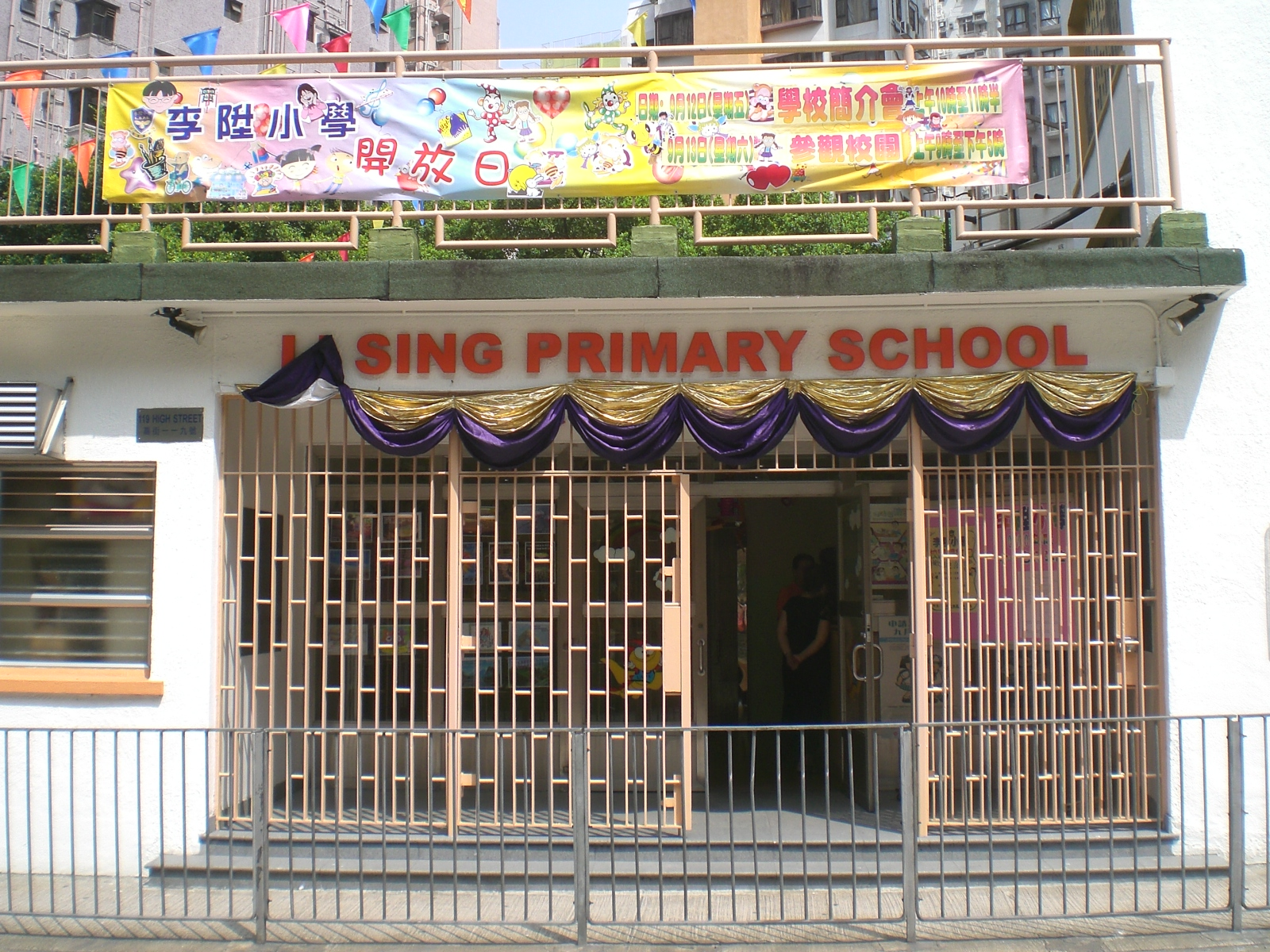
Li Sing Primary School (zh)

Primary schools

- Bonham Road Government Primary School
- Li Sing Primary School (李陞小學)

Kennedy Town is in Primary One Admission (POA) School Net 11. Within the school net are multiple aided schools (operated independently but funded with government money) and Bonham Road and Li Sing government primary schools.

Li Sing Primary originated from the attached primary school of Northcote College of Education. Li Sing Primary is named after Li Sing, one of the co-founders of Tung Wah Group of Hospitals, and the father of Li Po-chun (李寶椿), who decided to fund the school because it carried his father's name. Li Po-chun gave $250,000 Hong Kong dollars towards the school's construction. Leigh & Orange built the school, which opened in February 1955. The Governor of Hong Kong formally opening the facility. Originally the school had 12 schools and special vocational facilities. It became a site for adult education in the evenings, catering to adults with no secondary education diplomas, on 18 October 1955. This was the first such adult education centre in Hong Kong. It is on the Sai Ying Pun Heritage Trail (西營盤歷史文化徑).

Secondary schools

- King's College
- Lok Sin Tong Leung Kau Kui College
- St. Louis School, Hong Kong
- St. Paul's College, Hong Kong
- St. Stephen's Church College
- St. Stephen's Girls' College

University

- University of Hong Kong

== Historical buildings ==
Grade 1

- Façade of Old Mental Hospital (Sai Ying Pun Community Complex)
- Old Tsan Yuk Maternity Hospital – Main Building
- Tsung Tsin Mission of Hong Kong Kau Yan Church
- King's College

Grade 2

- No. 207 Des Voeux Road West – a four-storey shop house
- Old Lunatic Asylum Chinese Block – Main Building & Staff Quarters
- Old Tsan Yuk Maternity Hospital – Annex Block
- St. Louis School, Hong Kong – East Wing

Grade 3

- Tsung Tsin Mission of Hong Kong Kau Yan Church
- No. 19 Hing Hon Road
- Old Upper Levels Police Station
- Nos. 9 and 10 Yu Lok Lane
