= Hospital Road =

Street in Hong Kong

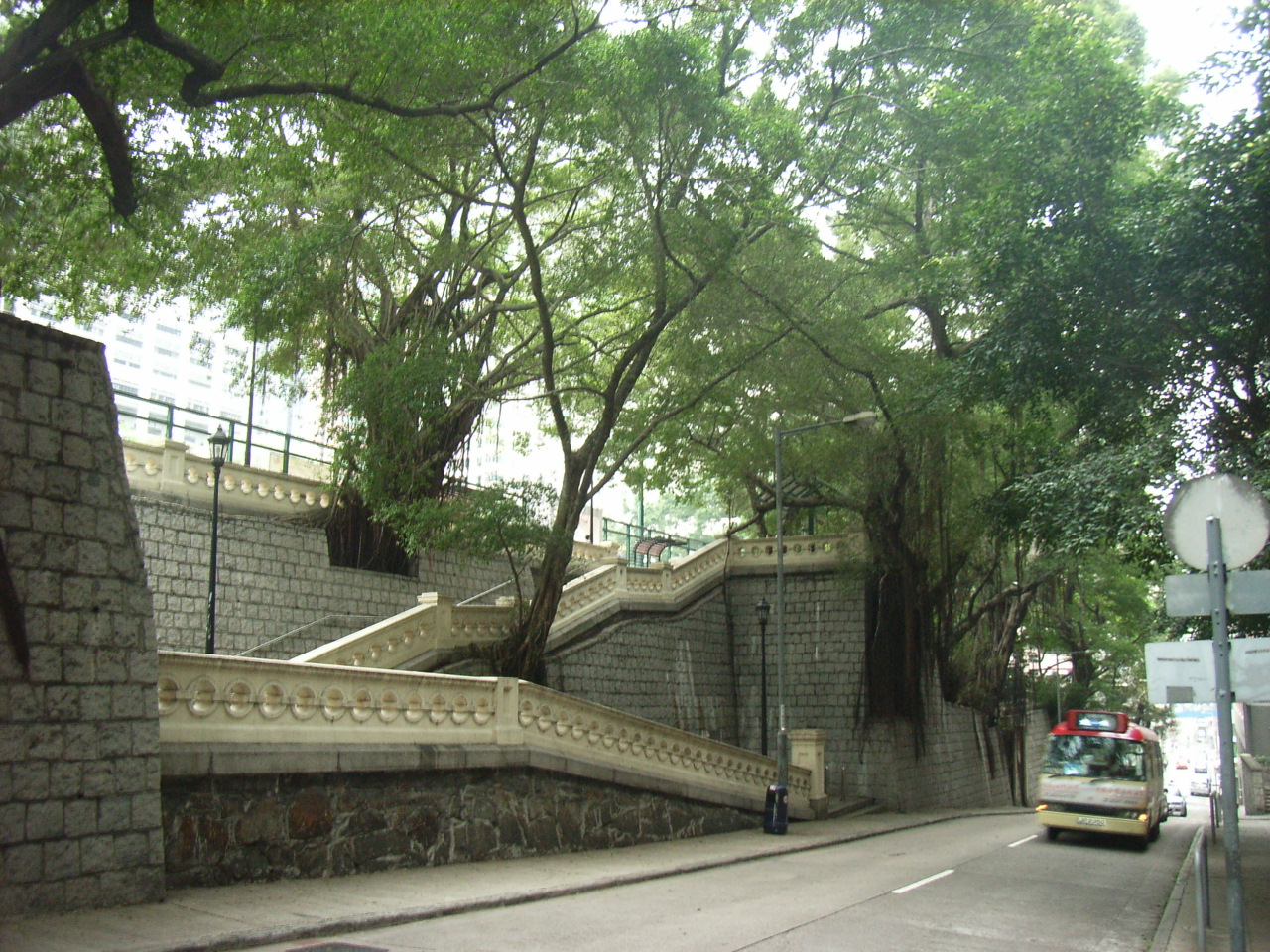
- An entrance to King George V Memorial Park along Hospital Road, 2006
- Interactive map of Hospital Road
- Native name: 醫院道 (Chinese)
- Location: Sai Ying Pun, Hong Kong

Hospital Road (Chinese: 醫院道) is a street in Sai Ying Pun, Hong Kong.

== Features ==
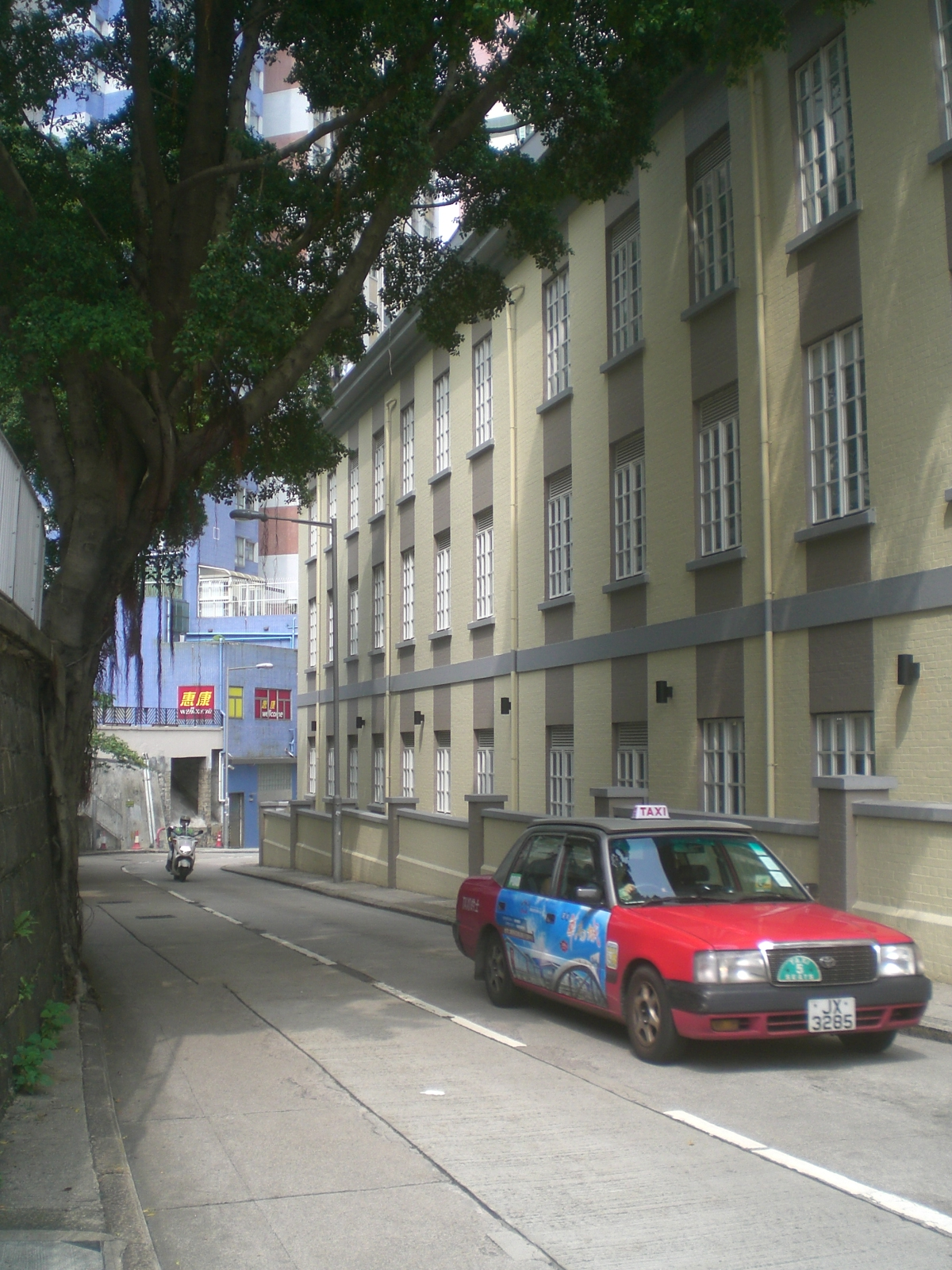
Part of the road in 2009. The building on the right is No. 4 Hospital Road, a Grade II historic building.

- King George V Memorial Park
- Prince Philip Dental Hospital
- Tsan Yuk Hospital

== Intersections ==
- Bonham Road
- Pound Lane
- Second Street
- Eastern Street

== See also ==
- List of streets and roads in Hong Kong
