= Sai Ying Pun Community Complex =

Building in Hong Kong

Coordinates: 22.284892°N 114.144081°E

- 西營盤社區綜合大樓
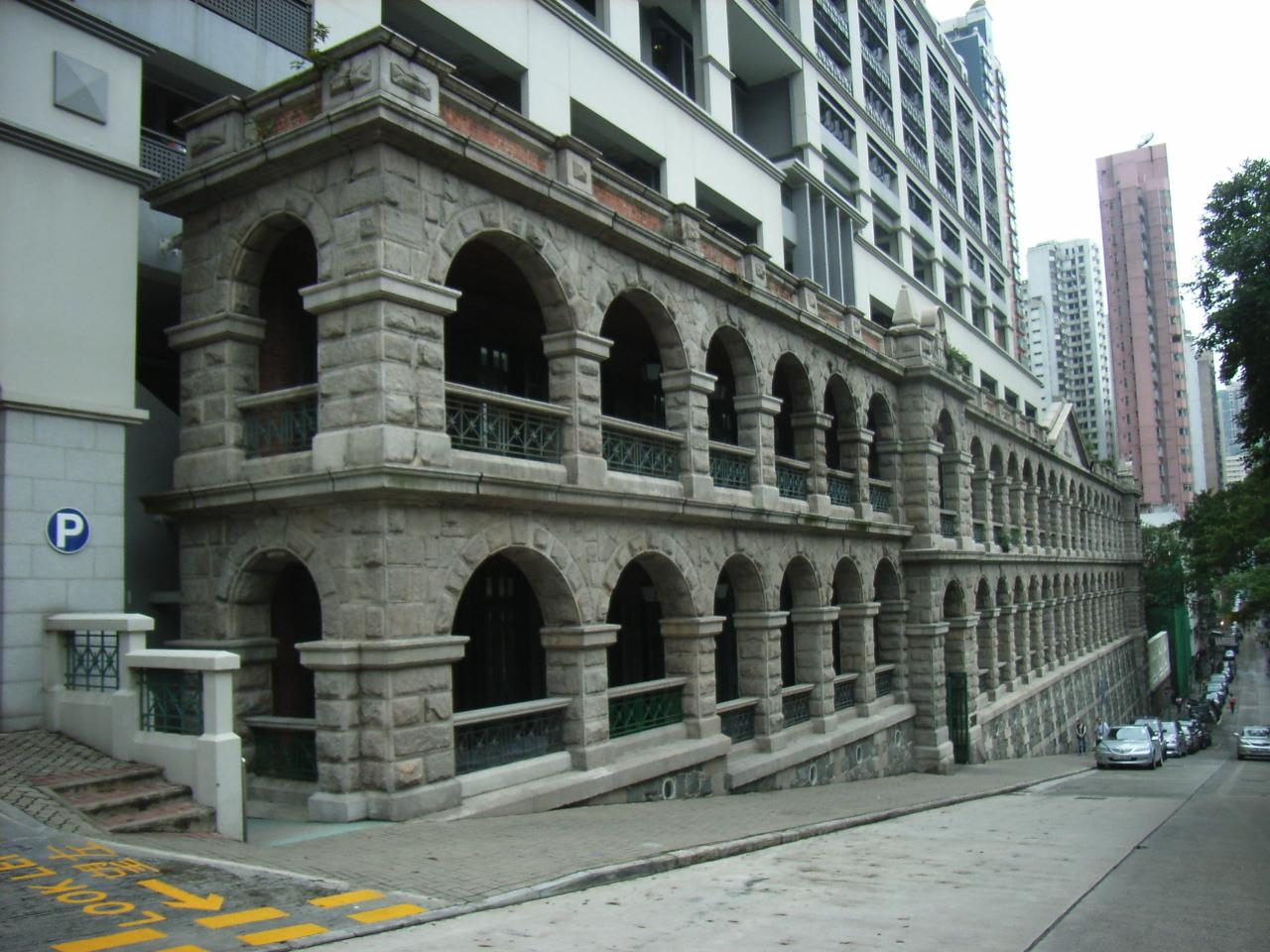
- Sai Ying Pun Community Complex has a Victorian facade with a modern building superimposed on it.
- Interactive map of the Sai Ying Pun Community Complex area
- Former names: Old Mental Hospital

General information
- Classification: Grade I declared monument
- Location: Sai Ying Pun, Hong Kong, 2 High Street, Hong Kong (special administrative region of the PRC)
- Completed: 1892; 134 years ago

Height
- Top floor: 9

Technical details
- Material: Granite

Design and construction
- Architect: Danby & Leigh

Sai Ying Pun Community Complex
- Traditional Chinese: 西營盤社區綜合大樓
- Simplified Chinese: 西营盘社区综合大楼
Transcriptions
Standard Mandarin
- Hanyu Pinyin: Xī Yíngpán Shèqū Zōnghé Dàlóu
Yue: Cantonese
- Yale Romanization: Sāi yìhng pùhn séh kēui jung hahp daaih làuh
- Jyutping: Sai1 jing4 pun4 se5 koei1 zung3 hap6 daai6 lau4

Old Mental Hospital
- Traditional Chinese: 舊精神病院
- Simplified Chinese: 旧精神病院
Transcriptions
Standard Mandarin
- Hanyu Pinyin: Jiù Jīngshén Bìngyuàn
Yue: Cantonese
- Yale Romanization: Gauh jīng sàhn behng yún
- Jyutping: Gau6 zing1 san4 beng6 jyun2

Sai Ying Pun Community Complex is located at 2 High Street, Sai Ying Pun, Hong Kong. It is a nine-storey building built on the site of the Old Mental Hospital, of which only the granite façade and arched verandah were preserved.

== History ==
The Old Mental Hospital was built in 1892. It was designed by Danby & Leigh (now Leigh & Orange). It was used as a quarters for the European nursing staff of the Civil Hospital (1846-1937) until the World War II. Originally, it contained only 10 bedrooms for the nurses, a matron's office, a chemical laboratory, 12 servants' quarters and other living, dining, kitchen, office and storage facilities. In the 1940s, the east wing was extended and six more arches were added to the original north facade, containing 18 arches with a pediment marking the middle and turrets at the ends to form a classically proportioned structure, during an extension uphill. The building was used to accommodate staff in 1941.

=== Mental hospital ===
It was turned into a mental hospital after the war. In 1947, this mental hospital was the only one of its type in the city when the population in Hong Kong was one and a half million.

The building was a female block of the mental hospital in the 1940s.

It continued to function as such until the Castle Peak Mental Hospital opened in 1961, and switched back as a day treatment centre for psychiatric out-patients until 1971.

=== High Street ghost house ===
Tales of ghostly sightings were spread since it was abandoned in the 1970s. Therefore, it is popularly known as "High Street Ghost House" or Haunted House in High Street. This building became the haunt of curious teenagers and drug addicts who used the methadone clinic nearby before the reconstruction, because the building remained unoccupied for 20 years from 1970s.

It fell into disrepair and was badly ruined by two fires, which were believed to be inadvertently started by trespassers. The Hong Kong Government decided in 1990s to keep the façade and rebuild a community centre within. In 2001, work was finally completed.

Therefore, only the north façade of the historic building is restored and preserved during the construction of Sai Ying Pun Community Complex as the historic building is the only specimen of its kind in Hong Kong.

The remains of the historic building is a Grade I Historic Building. It is part of the Central and Western Heritage Trail.

== Facilities ==
There is a community hall in the Sai Ying Pun Community Complex. It now houses several charity organizations, which provide services to the local community.

== Gallery ==
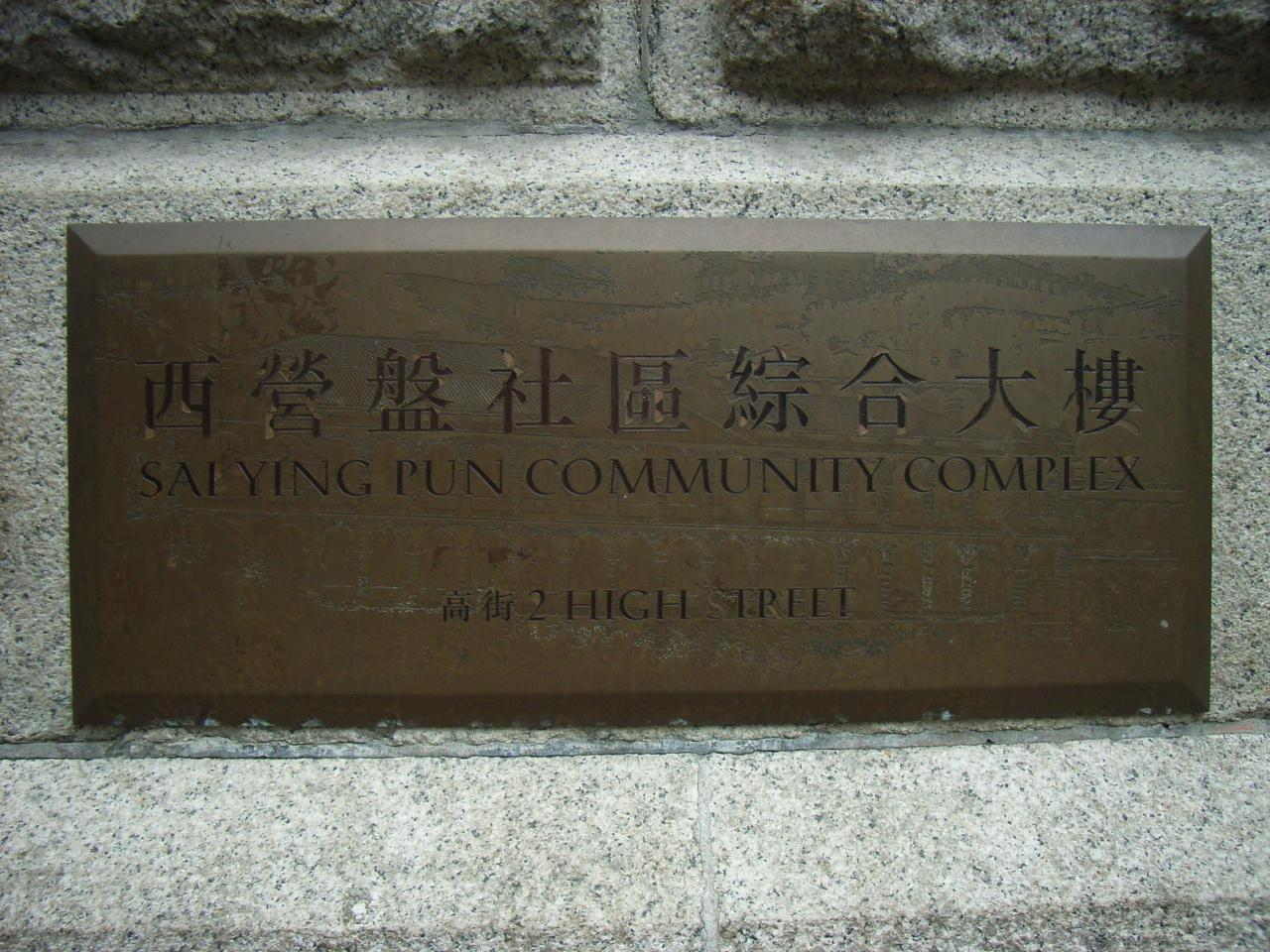

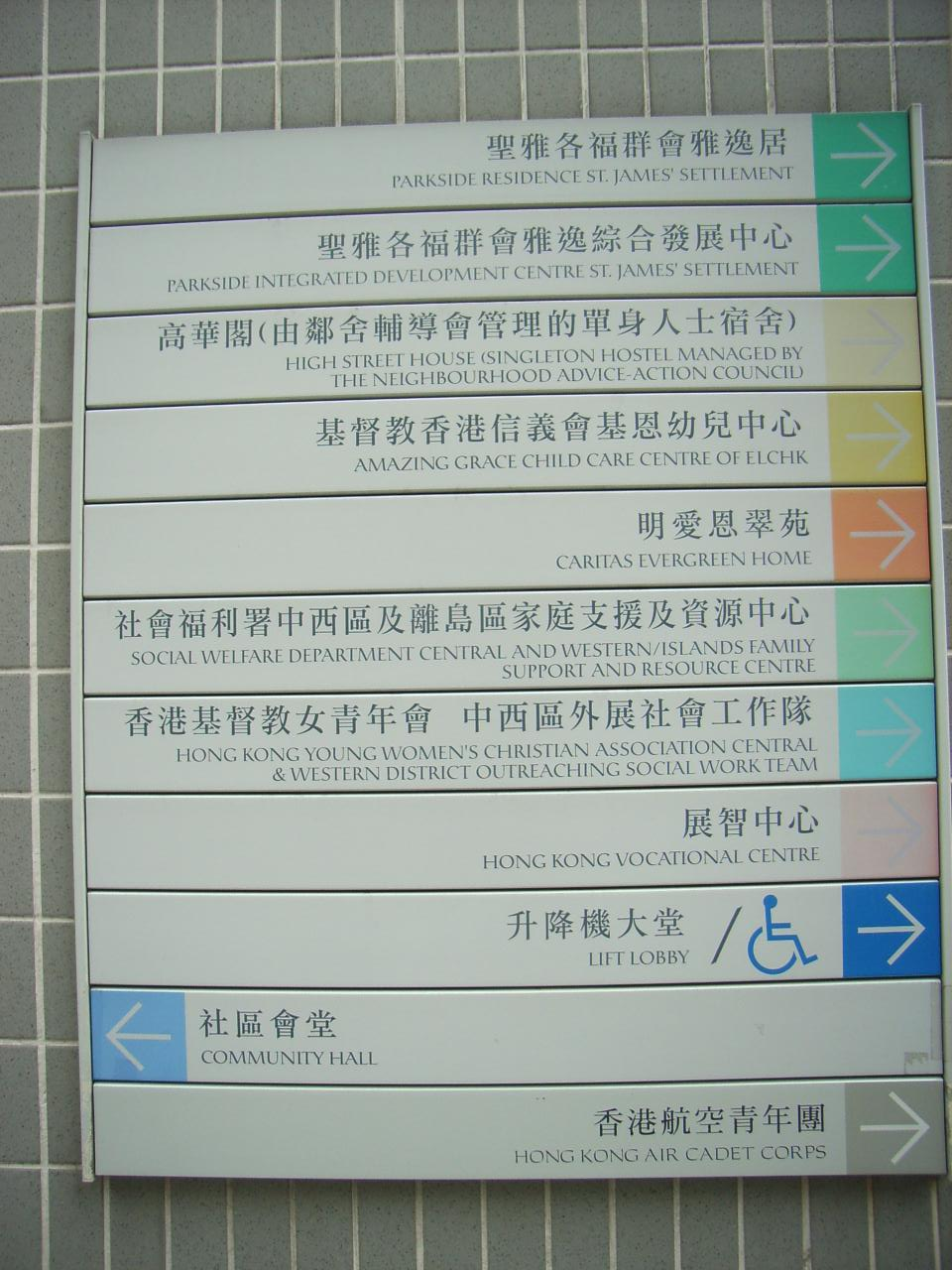
The directory of the Complex

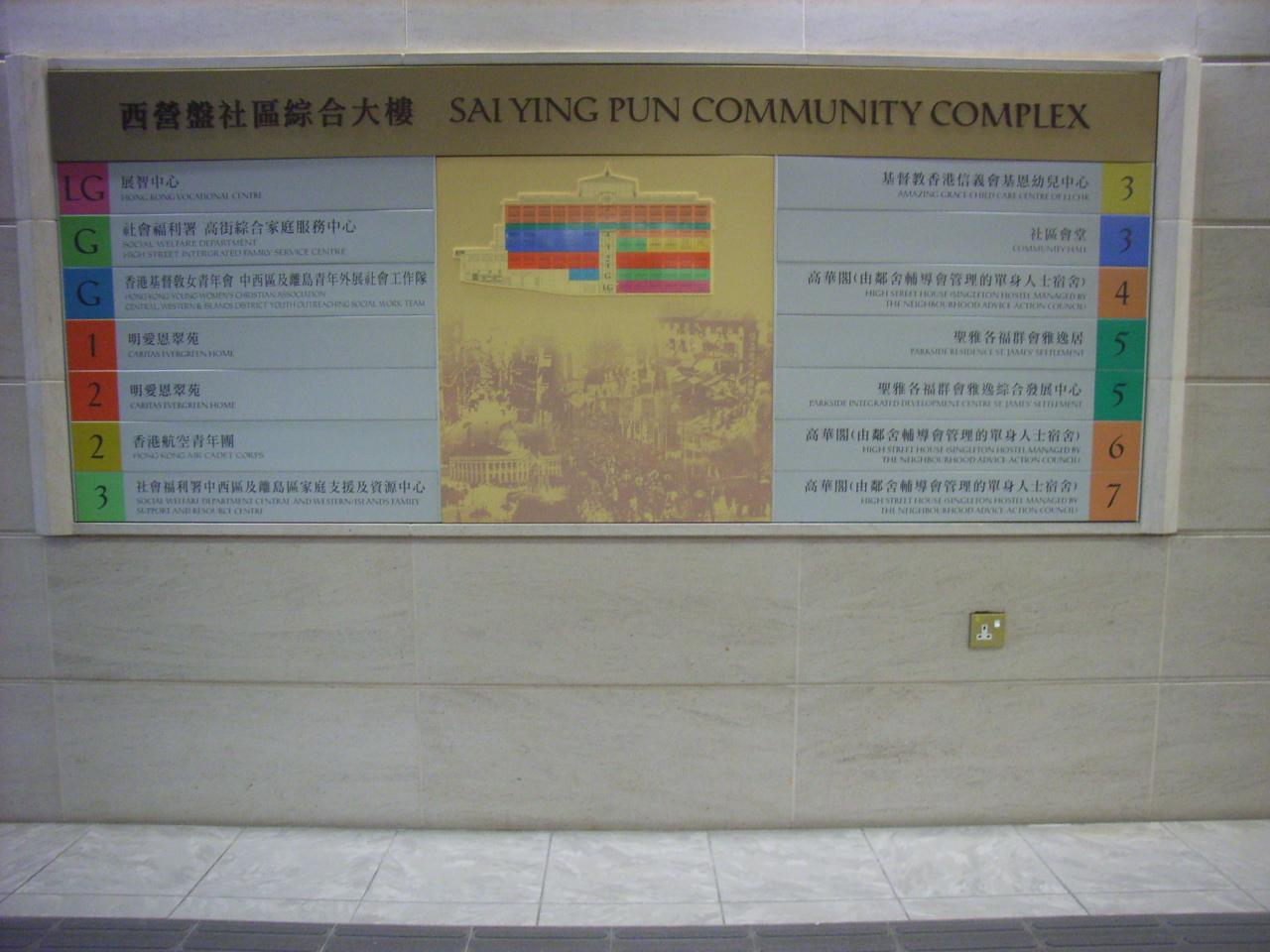
The floor plan of the Complex

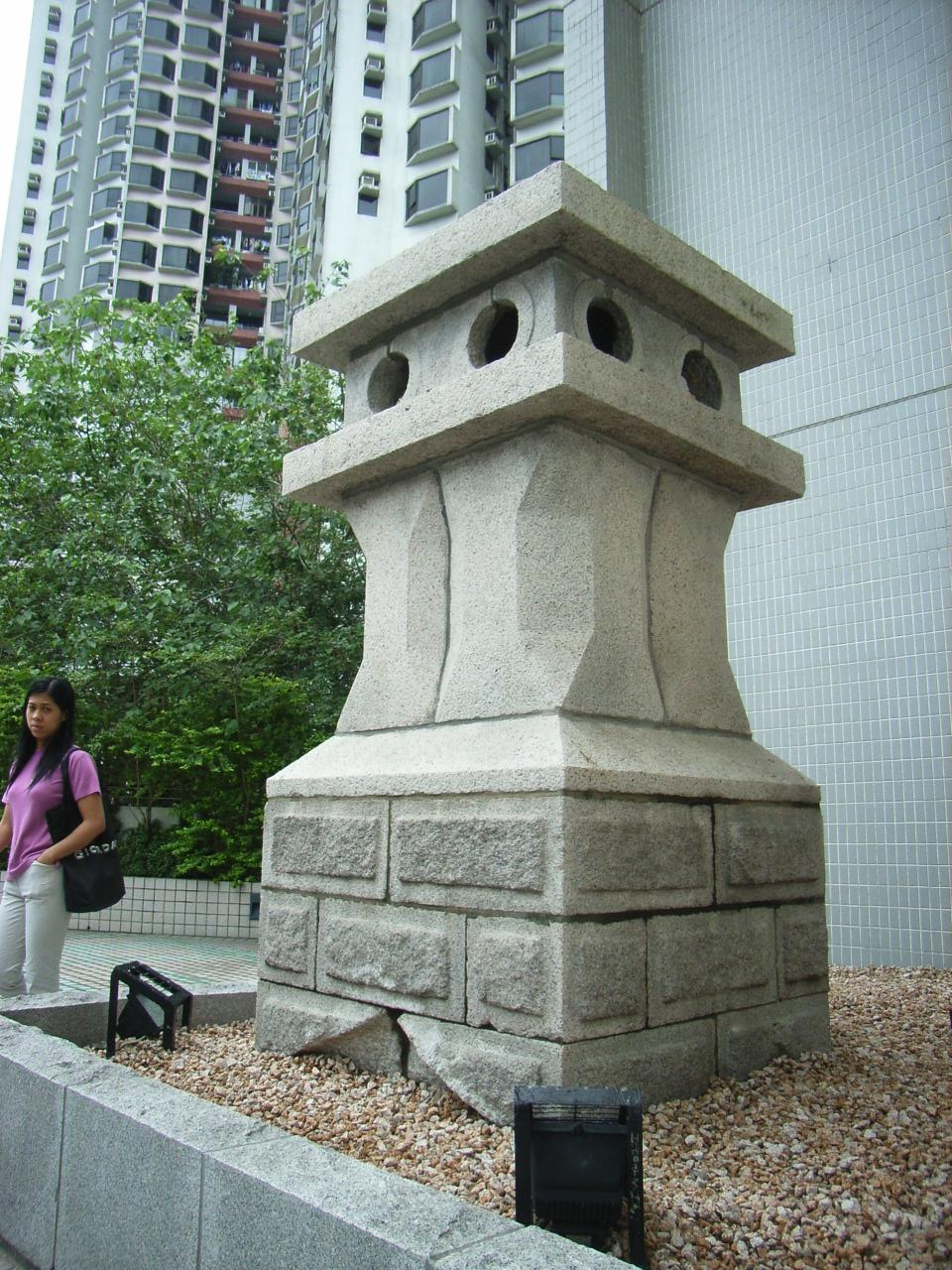

== See also ==
- Facadism
- King George V Memorial Park, Hong Kong
