= King's College, Hong Kong =

Government-operated school in Hong Kong, China

King's College
- Chinese: 英皇書院
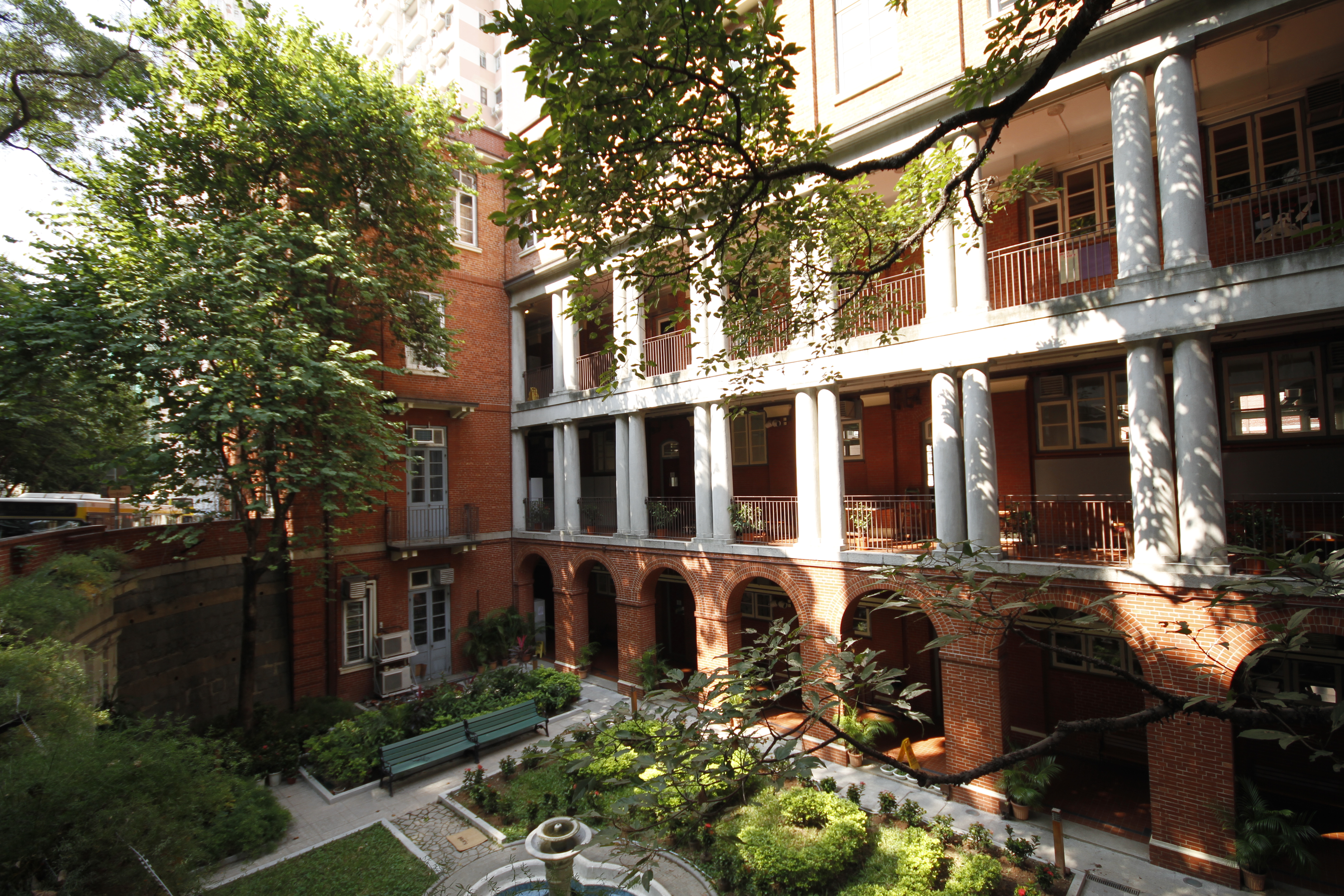
- 63A Bonham Road; Mid-Levels, Hong Kong

Information
- Type: Public, single-sex
- Motto: Meticulous thoughts, Diligent actions Chinese: 慎思篤行
- Established: 1857 (West Point School); 1879 (Saiyingpun School); 1926 (King's college)
- Founders: Reginald Edward Stubbs; Mr. Alfred Morris
- Principal: Ms. WONG Chau-ling, Fiona
- Staff: ~60
- Grades: Form 1(G7) – Form 6(G12)
- Color: King's crimson
- Newspaper: The Bridge
- Yearbook: The Fig Tree
- Website: kings.edu.hk

King's College, Hong Kong
- Traditional Chinese: 英皇書院
- Simplified Chinese: 英皇书院
- Literal meaning: British King Academy
Transcriptions
Standard Mandarin
- Hanyu Pinyin: Yīnghuáng Shūyuàn
Yue: Cantonese
- Yale Romanization: Ying wòhng syū yún
- Jyutping: Jing^{1} wong^{4} syu^{1} jyun^{2}

King's College (Chinese: 英皇書院), often referred to simply as King's or K.C., is a boys' government-operated secondary school located at 63A Bonham Road, Mid-levels, Hong Kong. It serves as a secondary education institution for pupils from forms 1–6. The school building has been a declared monument of Hong Kong since 2 December 2011.

== School history ==
=== West Point School (1857–1879) ===
In 1857, West Point School was established at West Point next to the West Point Police Station. The boys' school was a free village school supported by the Government stand and one of the second batches of the earliest government schools in Hong Kong.

In 1878, Governor Hennessy advocated the enhancement of the English Language and English speaking among the natives of Hong Kong, leading to the introduction of English teaching in Saiyingpun School and English training for the Chinese teachers. The Acting Inspector of Schools stated that he felt confident that it would sooner or later be found necessary to enlarge the teaching staff in order to meet the demand for English teaching.

The first Principal in 1859 was Li King-chau, who died in 1870. Cha Lun-kok and Chu Atuk were the teachers. The latter was appointed to teach English in the school and also taught in Taipingshan Government School. Although their geography and composition results were weak compared with other schools, all other aspects were very satisfactory. The Saiyingpun Punti School ranked as good in 1877.

The number of boys was 62 in 1859, separated into four classes. Girl students were admitted since 1868 in Punti whereas 1872 in Hakka section. In Punti section, the number increased a lot from the year of 1876 to 1878. The number of students in Punti section reached 100 in the year of 1876. According to the statistics recorded in the Hong Kong Government Gazettes and Blue Books from 1857 to 1879, the total number of students in the school increased steadily to 200 students approximately in the last few years.

The hours of tuition were from 6 to 8 am, 9 am to 12 pm and 1 to 4:30 pm. Hakka section was established in 1866 while the original one renamed as Punti section, the school divided into two sections respectively since then.

The Chinese Elementary Books, their Classics, Geography and the English Language are taught by competent native teachers. Moreover, several kinds of books are required to study in the government schools are as follows. Native books including Yau Hok, Trimetrical Classic, Thousand Character Book, Four Books, Five Classics and Chinese Grammar. Foreign books for instance New Testament, Muirhead's Geography, Do. History of England, Sacred History, Trimetrical Classic as well as Ten Commandments. English books for example Serious of Lessons, Morrison's Chinese-English Grammar, Circle of Knowledge and Geography. The Punti section increased from the fifth in 1868 to the second two years after in the order of efficiency between the government schools. The Hakka section was improving during the first several years of establishment.

=== Saiyingpun School (1879–1926) ===
In 1872, the school was renamed from West Point School to Saiyingpun School. Following the 1878 Central School dispute over English instruction, Governor John Pope Hennessy enacted reforms expanding English teaching in district schools, including an 1880 scheme for national free schools. It was relocated to 35–41 Third Street in 1879. It was one of the first batches of boys' government schools that provided junior Chinese and English education in various subjects. The first Principal (formally entitled "Master"), Mr. Fung Fu, received education in the US and was deeply influenced by the development of democracy in the West. During 1905, Mr. Fung held the post of a translator at the China Daily, a newspaper founded by local intellect Chen Shao-bai, Dr. Sun Yat Sen's dearest friend in his juvenile years.

Upon establishment, Saiyingpun School provided education from the eighth grade to the fourth grade (equivalent to primary five to secondary three nowadays). The then-Inspector of Schools, Dr. Eitel, allowed parents to choose between letting their children be taught both English and Chinese or exclusively English. Among 61 students in 1879, 46 chose the latter. After a few months, with the exception of one student, all students came under an English-medium education.

According to the Government Notification in 1880, the appraisal of the Education Bureau reported that Saiyingpun School had an outstanding performance, and thus was classified as "Rank 1". In 1880, Saiyingpun School operated with 74 students; by 1891 the total number of students amounted to 146. The campus in Third Street was no longer able to accommodate the increasing number of students. The school was relocated to 119 High Street.

According to "College Years of the Father of the Republic" written by Professor Lo Heung-lam, Kong Wing-wen and Lau Sz Fuk, enrolled in the Hong Kong College of Medicine for Chinese in 1887, the same year as Dr. Sun Yat Sen started his college life there. According to an article published in the 2002nd issue of the Christian Weekly, it stated that Kong and Lau used to be students in "Saiyingpun Fung Fu School". Lau graduated in 1895 with a degree in western medicine. The Master of Saiyingpun School between 1879 and 1903 was Mr. Fung Fu. With reference to his term of office, it is believed that the "Saiyingpun Fung Fu School" mentioned in the essay refers exactly to Saiyingpun School, that is currently King's College. If this assumption is correct, it is convinced to say that Lau Sz Fuk is among the earliest Kingsians ever to study western medicine.

In 1902, Mr. W. H. Williams took over as the Master of Saiyingpun School. In June 1905, Mr. Alfred Morris replaced Mr. W. H. Williams as the Master, the latter was transferred to Victoria British School earlier in January that year. When Master Morris took charge in mid-1905 following a months-long vacancy, attendance initially dropped, with the 1906 report recording a monthly average of 44 pupils (ranging from 35 to 49), before gradually expanding in subsequent years. In the Report of the Inspector of Schools published in 1905, Saiyingpun School students were rated "excellent" in English writing. According to the 1905 Report of the Inspector of Schools, after Master Morris took office, he immediately made the school start early even during the winter time to ensure students had enough time for extra-curricular activities like visits and swimming in the afternoon.

There are only fragments about the subject curriculum of Saiyingpun School from the Hong Kong Government Administrative Reports. For instance, in the 1922 Report, it was stated that students in Saiyingpun School excelled in map reading, handwriting, English conversation and composition. For extra-curricular activities, apart from volleyball, football, swimming and picnic activities, the 1922 Report stated that students were charity enthusiasts as well. Students raised a total of $800 for the Swatow Relief Fund. The scout team also helped Charitable Association to raise a total of $11,000. Students also received recognition in their extra-curriculum activities, for example, the Ambulance Division got Distinction of Winning Ralph Shield(Report of Director of Education).

In January 1903, British educator W. H. Williams (transliterated in Chinese as 韋霖士) succeeded Fung Fu as headmaster of Saiyingpun School. On 15 May 1903, Williams placed an admission advertisement in the Hong Kong Wah Tsz Yat Po under the Chinese title "Headmaster Wei Linshi of the Government Anglo-Chinese College, Saiyingpun" (Chinese: 西營盤國家華英書院掌院韋霖士), announcing an expansion of 30 student places at a monthly tuition fee of $2 for instruction in Western languages, liberal arts, and Chinese–English translation, with candidates interviewed in person at the Pok Fu Lam Road premises.

In 1921, the government reserved $50,000 for the construction of a new school at the chosen location at 63A Bonham Road. According to the Heritage Appraisal of King's College on the AMO's webpage, the new school was given an honourable name, "King's College", named after reigning King George V of the United Kingdom. When the construction was completed in March 1926, the seventh and the eighth classes of Saiyingpun School were moved into the new school. Then in September, the remaining classes were relocated. At the same time, the new school started to admit new students into newly established first, second and third classes. From then on, students completed the fourth class and obtained a qualification from the Junior Graduation Examination, they could be promoted to the third class in King's College instead of having to be transferred to the senior levels at Central School.

=== King's College (1926–) ===
==== Background and origins ====
King's College was founded on its present site in 1926. The school premises now stands on what was once the site of a Roman Catholic church called St. Anthony's built in 1892 'ex voto'. (Note: that is to say, its construction was funded by the contributions of the faithful) St. Anthony's was later demolished and replaced by an eponymous church in Pokfulam Road, which still stands today. Beside St Anthony's stood the Sacred Heart Chapel (1864–1892). This was built a few years before St Anthony's was built by the architect Mr. M.A. D'Aquino, and blessed in March 1879. (Note: according to the report in Catholic Register of that year) The land jointly occupied by the church and the chapel was named Inland Lot 755, and was the property of the Roman Catholic Church. Sometime after the construction of St Anthony's, probably because having two churches in such close proximity was seen as an inefficient use of holy land, the Sacred Heart Chapel was converted into an orphanage and school under the care of the Canossian Sisters – the Ling Yuet Sin Kindergarten of the present day. In 1920, there was a requisition order by government authorities for a portion of Inland Lot 755, the section where the Church of St Anthony stood.

==== Establishment and Pre-war era ====
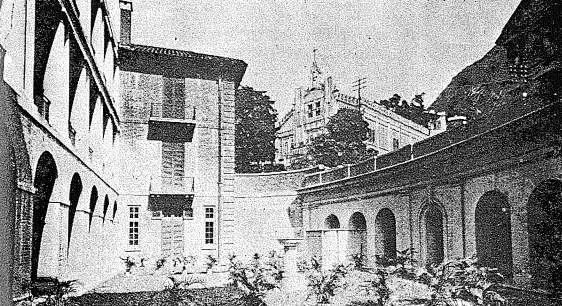
School Garden.(Before war)

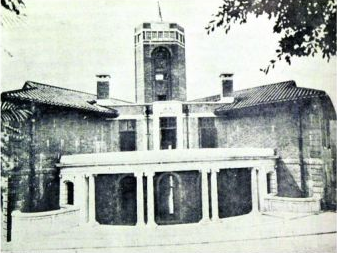
The Grand Entrance(before war). The destroyed bell tower and oriental glazed tiles roof can be seen.

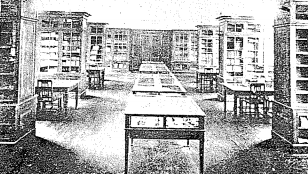
School Library with its associated museum.(Before war)

In 1923, foundations were laid and construction work began. Site formation, the foundation works and construction of retaining walls were undertaken by Messrs. Foo Loong & Co. in the same year and the superstructure was erected by Messrs. Kin Lee & Co. in 1924. After three years of construction, the works were completed in 1926. The Saiyingpun School moved to the new campus in the same year and was upgraded to King's College and accepted. In September, the qualified pupils from Saiyingpun School transferred to the new college. The college was named in honour of King George V. A portrait of the king is exhibited in the college's building. The governor reported king's college as one of the chief schools. Governor Cecil Clementi had personally chosen the name "King's College" during an inspection of the new campus in March 1926.

The Hong Kong Administrative Report of 1926 described King's College as "one of the finest and most modern of school buildings with 29 classrooms, staff and common rooms, the latest sanitary arrangements, hat and cloak rooms, a museum and library, an art room, physics and chemistry laboratories, a workshop, swimming pool and dressing rooms, gymnasium, covered playground, fire fighting appliances and the usual complement of storerooms and offices".

Four months later, from February to December, the building was commandeered for use as a military camp-cum-hospital for the British Shanghai Defence Force dispatched to protect British subjects in the British Section of the Shanghai Treaty Port. During the military occupation, King's College classes were temporarily accommodated at Ellis Kadoorie School and Queen's College. In 1928, the building was returned to King's College, which was officially opened by the Governor, Cecil Clementi, on 5 March.

There was a museum housed in the library and the layout of classrooms was somewhat different from now. There were 29 classrooms, accommodating 30 students each, a playground and a swimming pool. Each floor had a cloakroom with enough space for hats, umbrellas, and baskets. The laboratories were then on the top floor of the north wing, above the gymnasium. On the middle floor of the same wing was the art room and library. The swimming pool was filled with filtered water. The playground consisted of a jumping pit and one court each for basketball, volleyball and tennis.

Each pupil was allotted a numbered desk and the total capacity was 720 students. The school year began on 1 November and ended on 31 July. School fee for Classes 8, 7, 6, 5 and 4 was $60 per annum, payable in 12 instalments of $5 each, and $120 per annum, $10 for each instalment, for Classes 3,2 and 1. In addition, each pupil was charged a medical fee for $3 per year. From 1926 to 1930, it was a full-day school but thereafter changed to a half-day one, with activities in the afternoon. The first issue of the college magazine appeared in 1935, shortly after William Kay became Headmaster.

During the first fifteen years, the school followed the old system of class organisation with 8 classes. Classes 8 and 7 (primary 5 & 6 respectively today) were primary ones, Class 6 equivalent to the present Secondary 1, and Class 2 the present Secondary 5. The enrolment stood at 840 boys. Above eighty percentages of staff came from Britain. Most of the teachers graduated from the two leading ancient universities in England – University of Cambridge and University of Oxford. King's College was one of the few well-developed English colleges.

==== The Pacific War ====
While the school was enjoying its prosperous days, the Pacific War broke out after the Pearl Harbor Incident in December 1941. King's College was used as a first aid station, having been fully equipped as such by the first principal, A. Morris St. John's Ambulance. When Hong Kong was occupied by the Japanese on Christmas Day, King's College was used as a military mule and horse stable for the Japanese Army. Teachers like Messrs, Coxhead and Ferguson were taken war prisoners, while the principal, Mr. Wallington, was sent to the prison in Stanley. Mr. Coxhead was later sent to a labour camp in Japan.

The war caused immense damage to Hong Kong and King's College was not spared from this damage. All normal activities of the school came to a halt. The school building was virtually destroyed by looters during the last two weeks immediately after the withdrawal of the Japanese Army, and only an empty red brick skeleton of the building remained.

==== Post-war era ====
In 1945, some former teachers led by J.J. Ferguson and some old boys of King's College revived the school's operations. Subsequently, it returned to Hollywood Road as Hollywood Road A.M. School.

Prior to the Japanese Occupation, King's College was a joint primary and secondary school. After the Second World War was over, the school campus had to be rebuilt due to the wartime destruction. On 18 September 1950, it was reopened with a new first floor and operated as a two-sessional primary school, namely King's College Primary School (KCPS) for a year. It had to share its premises with Northcote Training College Attached School. Mr. H. T. Woo was Headmaster. In 1951, the government gave a green light on additional buildings for King's College and decided to restore its status as a secondary school.

==== After rehabilitation ====
In September 1951, King's College was rehabilitated with C. W. Sargison as principal. Then for the first time in the school's history, girls were admitted, most of whom were promoted from the Primary School. Total enrolment of pupils was 640.

The building was shattered and destroyed in the war, and was later restored with additional portions. The first phase of re-development of the school buildings was completed by 1953 with the addition of two laboratories, a Preparation Room, a lecture Room, an art Room and five classrooms in the South and East Wings. The enrolment figure soared to 750. However, during the next five years, owing to slow pace of construction after the war of school buildings, King's College had again to share the premises successively with Grantham Training College and Queen Elizabeth School and operated only on a bi-sessional basis. It was not until 1960 that King's College started to be the sole user of the premises.

In 1954, Mr. C. W. Sargison was transferred to King George V School. He was succeeded by Mr. F.K. Leung MBE, an old boy of Saiyingpun School and a pupil of A. Morris. Leung was the first Chinese principal of a government secondary school in Hong Kong. The school had restored the house system of prewar days. Instead of calling them North, South, East, and West, they are named after four former principals – Morris, Kay, Wallington, and Ferguson.

In the same year, an extra Secondary Upper Six was operated to make places available for students who planned to sit for the revised Hong Kong University Matriculation Examination. There were nineteen classes ranging from Form 2 to Upper 6 in total. Facilities of the school provided for the training of students doing the Hong Kong University Diploma of Education and of students from the Northcote Training College. The subjects taught are English, Chinese, Mathematics, Physics, Chemistry, Biology, Geography, History, Civics, Art, Music and Physical Training. In 1955, witnessed the first group of King's graduates, entering University after the war.

The pressing need for further expansion of the school finally received a positive response from the government. An additional floor was added to the South Wing and the two floors above the gymnasium were restored. Additionally, an extra floor was added on top of the East Wing in the front of the Hall gallery, which later became the library. The final stage of construction work was completed by December 1959 and fitting out of the new premises followed in the next few months.

It was during Coxhead's tenure of office (1960–1967) that King's College entered a new stage of alteration and progress. In 1963 Secondary Lower Six Arts classes were opened after a hiatus of several years. This restored the balance between Science and Arts classes though the demand for entrance to Science or Medicine classes was still greater. From 1966 onwards, girls were admitted only in Secondary 6.

In 1967 H.W. Clarke succeeded Coxhead as principal and it was during the next three years that King's witnessed a climax of academic attainment. In 1968 64 distinctions were obtained by King's College students in the Hong Kong University Matriculation Examination, an unprecedented achievement. By 1971, D.R. Madan was appointed principal and King's students continued to achieve magnificent feats in both academic and extracurricular fields.

In October 1977 K.F. Chu, an old boy who had graduated in 1938, became principal.

The fountain of the school garden was repaired and its pedestal was turned into a pond for the breeding of goldfish and various other species of carp. A Bauhinia tree was planted in the northern corner of the school garden while the palm tree planted in 1971 had grown to 3 storeys tall. In April 1986, a time capsule was buried in the school garden.

==== Late 20th century–present ====
In September 1986, W.T. Poon succeeded Chu Ka Fai as principal and the entire enrolment soared to 1200. Poon was famed throughout the Education Department for being his lively and enthusiastic personality. A public address system was installed in the playground, which proved to be effective in developing a greater sense of unity in students. Under Poon's leadership, the students won the International Mathematics Olympiad Championship.

For the first time in the history of the school, study tours to Singapore and Malaysia were organised with part of the funds sponsored by the King's College Old Boy Association. In March 1992 the first K.C. Student Union was formed after a democratic election.

In the transition year of 1997 in which the Handover took place, King's College was provided a chance to renew its oath to play a major role in the community of Hong Kong and China. Dr. Simon Li Fook Sean, and old boy of King's College, received the Grand Bauhinia Medal (GMB) from the HKSAR Government in acknowledgement of his stupendous contributions to Hong Kong and China. Dr. Li was among the first recipients of this award.

Following the appointment of a new principal, Mr. Ho Yue Shun, in 1998, King's College has undergone massive changes, especially on the information technology front. King's was enlisted as one of the few secondary school participants in a pilot scheme for the application of IT in education. A sum of HK$6M was granted for the acquisition of hardware and the installation of King's College's own intranet. An Information Technology Open Day was launched, which was followed by the launch of the school website, school intranet and a renovated IT room complete with modern computer facilities. Professor Robert F. Curl, 1996 Nobel Laureate in Chemistry, visited King's College and met the senior students on 9 May 2002. On 29 October 2003, Professor Jean-Marie Lehn, Nobel Laureate in Chemistry, visited King's College and met the senior students. In 2010, Mr. Ho Yue Shun was succeeded by Mrs. Chan Woo Mei-hou. King's College is one of the few surviving pre-war government school buildings in Hong Kong.

In January 2023, the school said that it would terminate contracts with external service providers if any of their activities were "found to promote political messages, express a political stance or views, endanger national security or violate the law."

== School campus ==
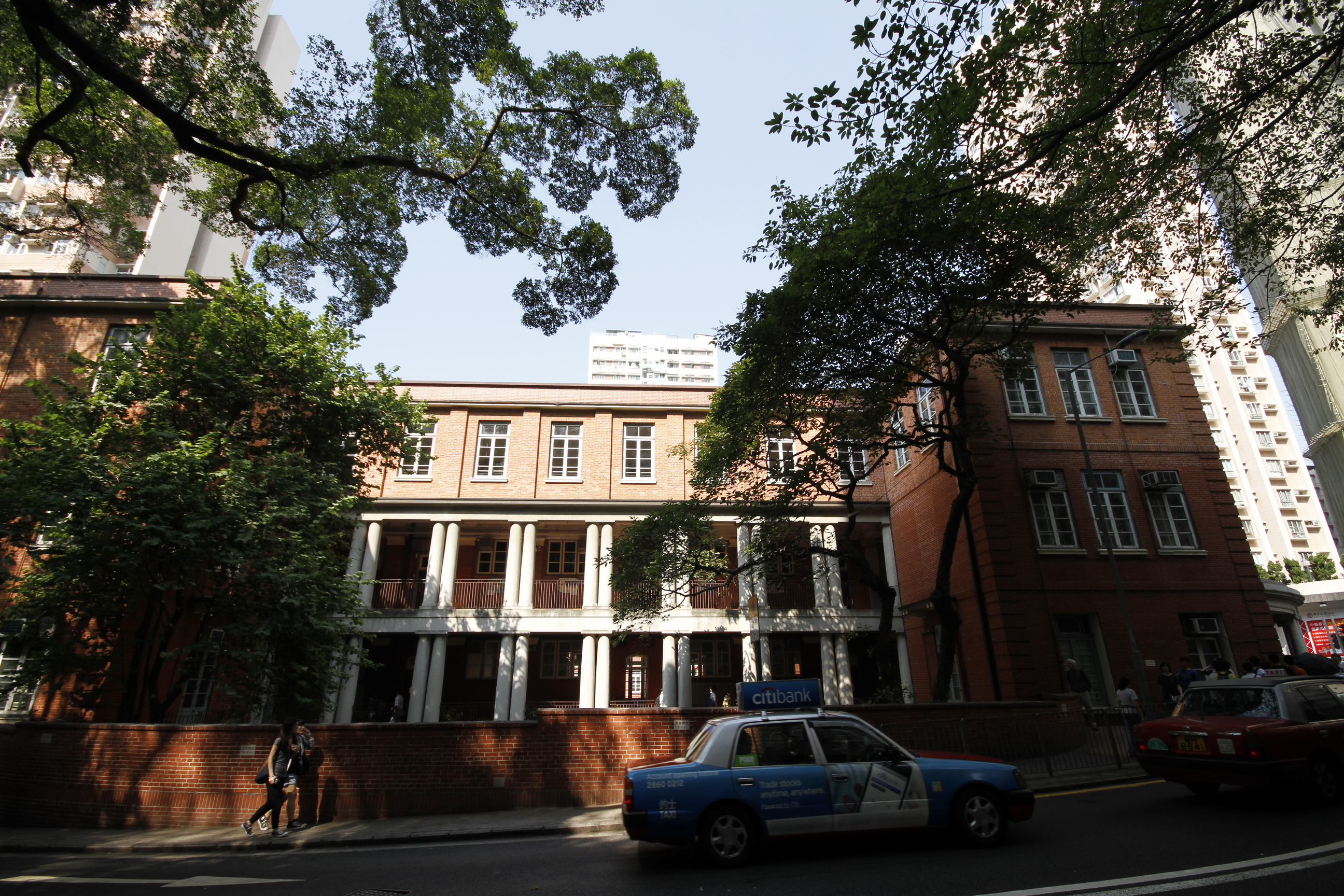
Traffic on Bonham Road spiraling around the South Wing.

King's College Bonham Campus Hong Kong Declared Monument M00101
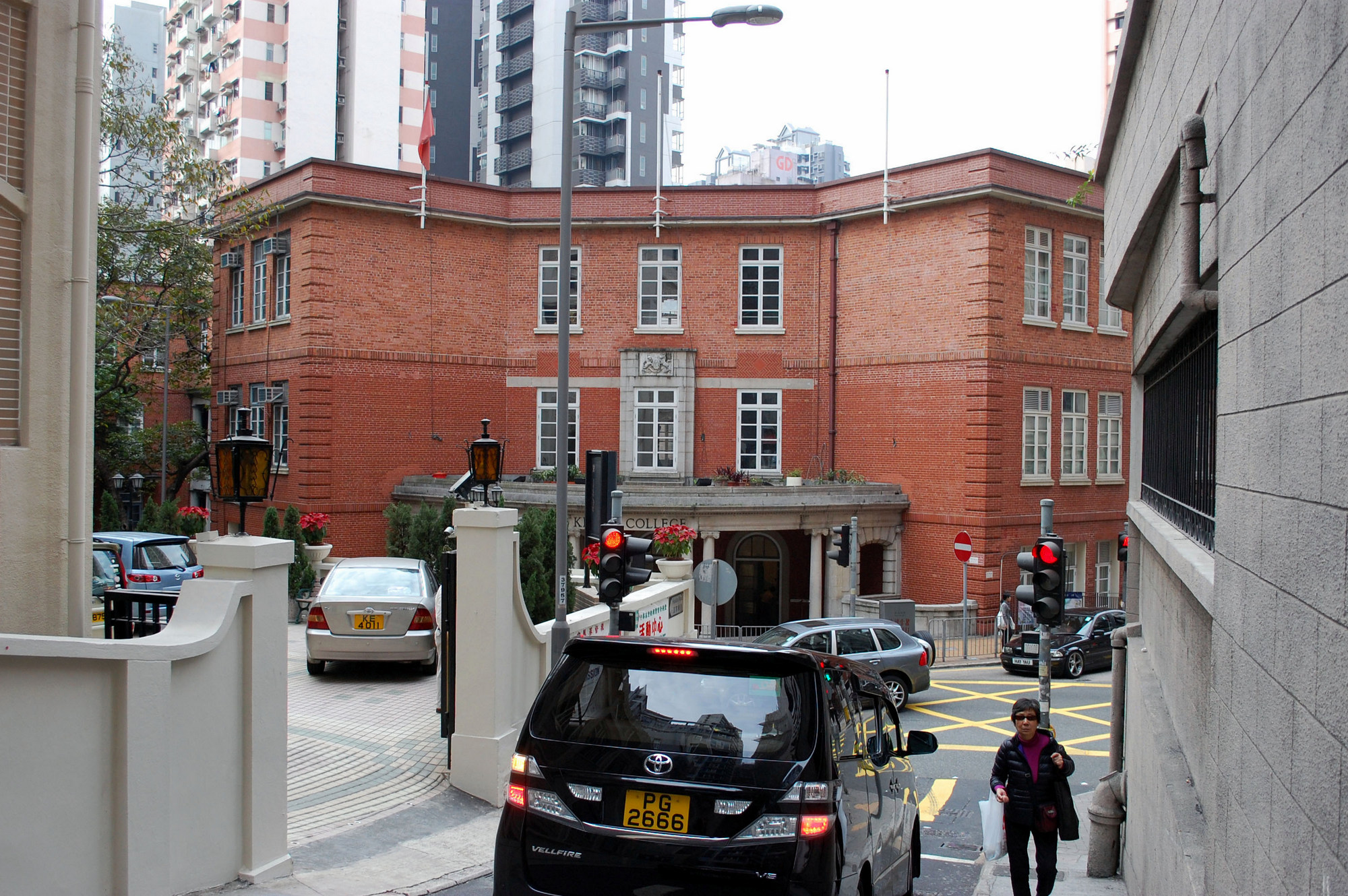
- View of the Entrance from Honiton Road

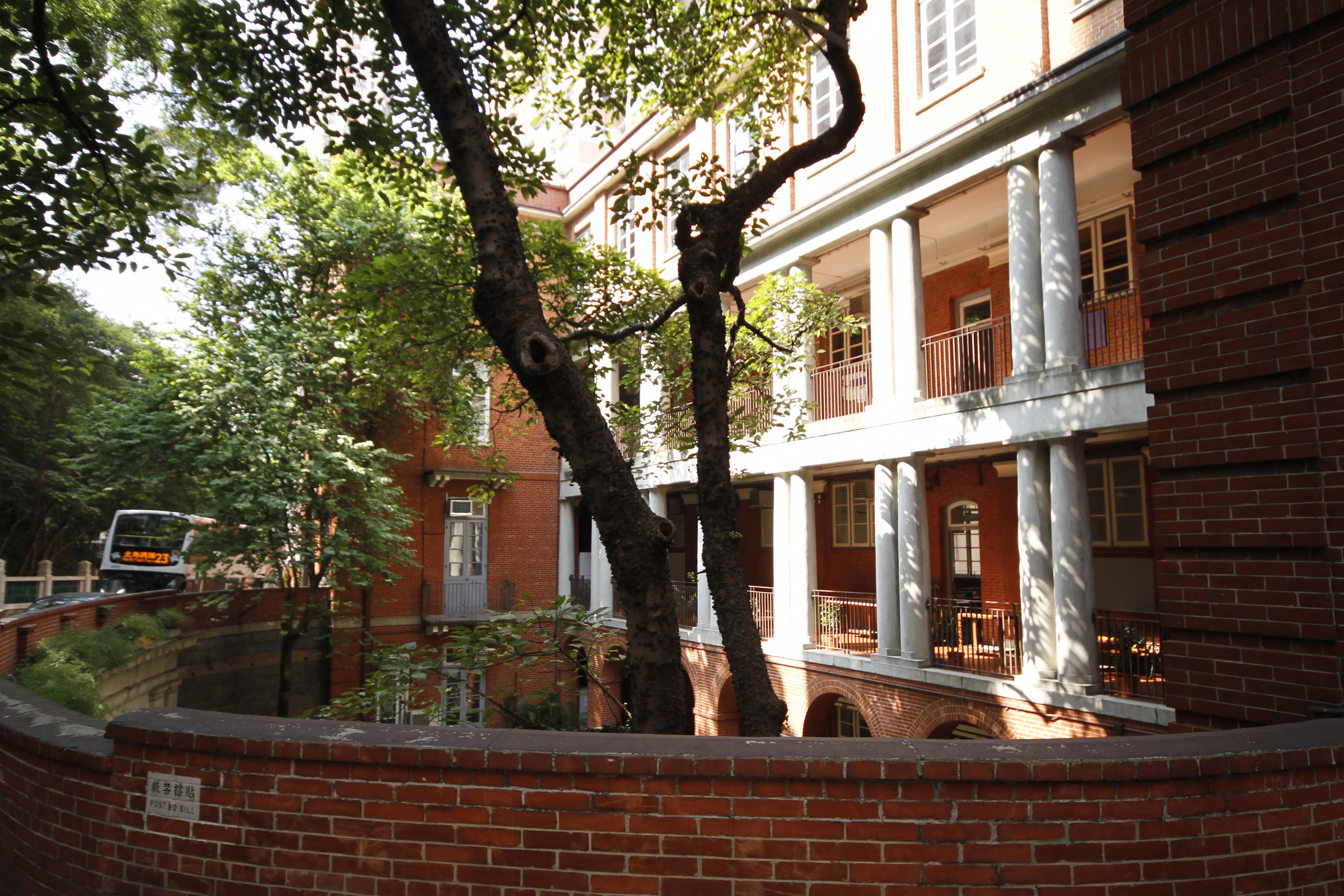
- Campus' south wing teaching block beside Bonham Road

- Location within Hong Kong

General information
- Type: School building
- Architectural style: Neo-classicism
- Location: 63A Bonham Road, Hong Kong, HKSAR
- Coordinates: 22°17′04.14″N 114°8′24.94″E
- Construction started: 1923^{1}
- Completed: 1925^{1}
- Inaugurated: 5 March 1928; 98 years ago
- Renovated: 1950–1959
- Cost: Lack of info
- Client: Hong Kong Government
- Owner: Hong Kong Government

Height
- Height: 135 feet (41 m)

Design and construction
- Architect: Lack of info
- Architecture firm: Messrs. Foo Loong & Co. Messrs. Kin Lee & Co.
- Main contractor: Messrs. Foo Loong & Co. Messrs. Kin Lee & Co.

Website
- http://www.kings.edu.hk

References
- ^{1} – http://www.amo.gov.hk

Built in 1926, the Bonham Road Campus is one of the oldest surviving pre-war government school buildings in Hong Kong. The red-brick school building in neo-classical style was originally built around the three sides of a square in 1926 and the whole building comprised a North Wing, a South Wing and an East Wing with a bell tower (now removed) above the colonnaded curved entrance porch at the junction of Bonham Road and Western Street. The three wings of the school building are arranged in collegiate style around a central courtyard which serves as the school playground to form a quadrangle.

Red-brick Roman arched colonnades are applied along the facade and corridor on the ground floor of the South Wing and coupled columns form loggias on the first and second floors. Roman arched colonnades are also found on the front elevations of the East and North Wings.

Clerestory windows are found on the upper part of the bricked-up arches of the North Wing. Some doorways have Roman arches or flattened arches with fanlight glazing. The red-brick wall angles are emphasised with quoins.

A notable aspect of the school building is its circular entrance porch at the junction of Bonham Road and Western Street. The porch is supported by granite coupled columns with Ionic Order capitals featuring volute brackets and Italian Renaissance style side openings. A groin vault can be seen on the top floor of the entrance block which is rarely found in other school buildings.

The building which houses the college has evolved over the years since its establishment in 1926. It was once damaged in World War II and rebuilt and refurbished after the war. Since then the orthodox structure has reserved its current façades of grey granite columns against a background of crimson bricks, arched corridors and cavernous garden, an image widely held by its students and the public as an epitome of the college.

On 2 December 2011, the school building was declared as a monument by the Antiquities and Monuments Office.

== Academics ==
=== HKDSE ===
Excellent rate
	No. of candidates	Level 4 or above (per candidate)	Pass rate
2016	159	4.58	97%
2015	171	4.44	97%
2014	166	4.57	96%
2013	179	4.81	90%
2012	n/a	n/a	n/a

King's College has produced 3 perfect scorers "10As" in the history of Hong Kong Certificate of Education Examination (HKCEE) and 3 "Top Scorers" and "Super Top Scorers" in Hong Kong Diploma of Secondary Education Examination (HKDSE).

7 x 5** "Top Scorers" are candidates who obtained perfect scores of 5** in each of the four core subjects and three electives.

8 x 5** "Super Top Scorers" are candidates who obtained seven Level 5** in four core subjects and three electives, and an additional Level 5** in the Mathematics Extended (M1/M2) module.

== Admission ==
=== EDB Pre-S1 ===
EDB Pre-S1
	King's College			Queen's College			Territory-wide average		
	Chi	Eng	Math	Chi	Eng	Math	Chi	Eng	Math
2015 ~2016	92.90	80.20	86.90	89.90	90.37	86.90	52.99	49.67	57.64
2014 ~2015	85.90	80.60	88.20	83.50	87.70	88.20	52.99	49.67	57.64
2013 ~2014	83.50	80.60	85.50	91.30	90.30	88.90	49.63	49.43	59.98
2012 ~2013	82.80	78.40	78.40	88.90	88.60	88.10	49.63	49.43	59.98

== List of notable alumni ==
King's College's alumni include the "father of OLED" Ching W. Tang; the "father of rehabilitation" in Asia Sir Harry Fang; Hong Kong senior judge and politician Simon Li; Chief Executive Leung Chun Ying; Hong Kong media mogul George Ho; the first Chinese Commissioner of the Royal Hong Kong Police, Li Kwan Ha; the last Commissioner of the Royal Hong Kong Police Hui Ki On; industrialist and politician Sir Sze-yuen Chung; and the creator of Hang Seng Index Stanley Kwan.

Alumni noted for their work in academia include "father of OLED" Ching W. Tang; the former Vice-Chancellor of the Chinese University of Hong Kong Ma Lin; and American scientist and author Deborah Chung.

== Administration ==
=== School Management Committee (SMC) ===
The current governing body of King's College is the Hong Kong Education Bureau, which classifies it as a government school. The school's management was previously under the control of the Education Bureau. In 2004, the Hong Kong Legislative Council passed the "School-Based Management Policy," which stipulated the establishment of incorporated management committees for aided schools. Government schools also adopted the management framework of incorporated management committees, following the model of aided schools, during the 2005/06 school year. The Education Bureau's implementation of school-based management aimed to decentralize decision-making powers such as student learning and resource allocation to schools. As a result, King's College established the School Management Committee (SMC), which functions similarly to the incorporated management committees of aided schools or the sponsoring bodies of direct subsidy schools. The SMC includes teachers, alumni, and parents as members, in accordance with government regulations.

In theory, SMC members have the authority to convene SMC meetings and make decisions on various development issues of the school without following government policies. However, the position of the Chairman of the SMC at King's College is held by a senior official from the Education Bureau, and the Chairman has the power of veto in voting. Therefore, decision-making at meetings still closely follows the government's education policies.

=== List of Principals ===
As a government school, the principal of King's College is appointed by the Education Bureau and is part of the civil service system. The selection of principals is not the responsibility of the SMC. On the other hand, the school sponsoring bodies/incorporated management committees of subsidized schools have the authority to appoint a Principal Selection Committee to select the principal of their respective schools. In the past, it was customary for the education department to appoint former teachers or alumni of King's College as the principal of the school. Some examples include Fu Ka-sun, Leung Fung-ki, Kwok Sze-hei, Chu Ka-fai, and Leung Cheuk-wing. This practice was an unwritten rule.

List of principals

	English name	Chinese name	Portrait	Term of office
West Point School
1.	Mr. Li King-chau	李鏡州先生		1857–1870
2.	Mr. Lau Hiu Tung			1871–1878
2.	Mr. Ip Cheung Shin			1871–1879
3.	Mr. Chan Fong			1878–1879
4.	Mr. Fung Fu	馮扶先生		1879
Saiyingpun School
1.	Mr. Fung Fu	馮扶先生		1879–1903
2.	Mr. W. H. Williams	威廉士先生		1903–1905
3.	Mr. Alfred Morris	莫理士先生		1905–1926
King's College(Before War)
1.	Mr. Alfred Morris	莫理士先生		March 1926 – June 1934
2.	Mr. William Kay	祈惠霖先生		June 1934 – March 1939
Acting principal	Mr. W. L. Handyside	韓德璽先生		March 1935 – November 1935
Acting principal	Mr. Herbert Howell Beddow	畢道先生		January 1936 – July 1937
Acting principal	Rev. George E. S. Upsdell	安士棣牧師		March 1937 – December 1937
3.	Mr. H. G. Wallington	威靈頓先生		March 1939 – December 1941
After War
4.	Mr. J. J. Ferguson	富嘉新先生		October 1946 – July 1947
5.	Mr. J. W. Wilson	威爾遜先生		August 1947 – September 1951
King's College Primary School
1.	Mr. Woo Hing-tak	胡興德先生		August 1950 – September 1951
King's College
6.	Mr. C. W. Sargison	沙治臣先生		September 1951 – July 1954
7.	Mr. Leung Fung-ki	梁鳯岐先生		July 1954 – January 1957
8.	Mr. C. W. Sargison	沙治臣先生		September 1957 – July 1960
Acting principal	Mr. Geoffrey Serville Coxhead	郭士熙先生		July 1958 – March 1959
9.	Mr. G. S. Coxhead	郭士熙先生		September 1960 – June 1967
Acting principal	Mr. P. R. Halliwell	夏理威先生		January 1963 – August 1963
10.	Mr. H. W. Clarke	祈立德先生		June 1967 – June 1971
Acting principal	Mr. H. N. Mcneill	麥尼路先生		April 1969 – January 1970
11.	Mr. D. R. Madan	馬丹先生		June 1971 – September 1977
12.	Mr. Chu Ka-fai	朱家輝先生		October 1977 – August 1986
13.	Mr. Poon Wai-tong	潘煒棠先生		September 1986 – December 1996
Acting principal	Mr. Leung Chik-wing	梁植穎先生	July 1992 – August 1992; July 1994 – August 1994; July 1995 – August 1995; July 1996 – August 1996; December 1996 – August 1997	
14.	Mr. Ho Yue-Shun	何汝淳先生		September 1997 – August 2010
15.	Mrs. Chan Woo Mei-hou, Nancy	陳胡美好女士		September 2010 – August 2016
16.	Mr. TANG Kai-chak	鄧啟澤先生		September 2016–

== See also ==
- King's College Harmonica Band
- Education in Hong Kong
- List of buildings and structures in Hong Kong
- list of schools in Hong Kong
