= King George V Memorial Park =

King George V Memorial Park may refer to:

- King George V Memorial Park, Hong Kong
- King George V Memorial Park, Kowloon

== See also ==
- King George V Park, St. John's, Newfoundland, Canada
