= Sai Ying Pun (novel) =

2016 novel written by Echo of Heart

- Book cover of the paperback version
- Author: Echo of Heart
- Language: Cantonese
- Genre: horror, fantasy
- Publisher: Idea Publication
- Publication date: 1 July 2016
- Publication place: Hong Kong
- Media type: Print (paperback), e-book
- Pages: 328
- ISBN: 978-9-881-47023-2

Sai Ying Pun
- Traditional Chinese: 西營盤
- Simplified Chinese: 西营盘
- Literal meaning: Sai Ying Pun
Transcriptions
Standard Mandarin
- Hanyu Pinyin: Xīyíngpán
Yue: Cantonese
- Jyutping: sai^{1} jing^{4} pun^{4}
- IPA: [sɐj˥ jɪŋ˩ pʰun˩]

Sai Ying Pun (Chinese: 西營盤) is a Hong Kong horror fantasy novel written by web novelist Echo of Heart in 2016. The novel was inspired by the postponement in service of the newly built MTR Sai Ying Pun Station and urban legends of the neighboring Whitty Station and Rumsey Station. The novel received widespread acclaim and won the annual Hong Kong Book Awards in humanities category.

A film adaptation was announced in 2016, but the project was cancelled in 2020.

== Synopsis ==
Ah Wang is a railway security guard stationed at the newly built Sai Ying Pun Station. Shortly after the station's opening, Wang is attacked and knocked out by a mysterious beast while he is on patrol. He wakes up in a hospital, with a man named Ga Yin warns him not to return to the Station in the meantime. However, two weeks later, Wang is forced to take the Island line and mysteriously blacks out on the train. He regains consciousness and finds himself trapped on the train with four others. The train ultimately stops at the Sai Ying Pun Station after a ridiculously lengthy ride. The group tries to leave the station, only to be attacked at the exit with Ga Leung killed and the gang is forced to split up. Wang later meets his colleague, Uncle Tat, in the dungeons and Tat informs him about the subterrane, a group of living creatures inhabited underground and would "harvest" skins of humans to hijack their bodies. Before Tat can finish, they are attacked by the subterranes again and Wang is knocked out again in the chase.

Wang wakes up and finds himself being saved by a young girl called "April". "April" admits that she is a subterrane who wants both races to live separately and peacefully. She was one of the representatives who tried to establish a diplomatic relationship with the United Kingdom and Soviet Union and the two races built the Whitty Station as a connection hub, before a war that caused the subsidence of Whitty Station broke out. "April" and her human friend April were both severely injured in the battle and April sacrificed herself by allowing "April" to harvest and live in her body. Wang decides to trust "April". The duo thus head to the lair of the subterranes and try to save Pak Gor and Tracy, but Pak Gor is already transformed and Wang puts him out of mercy.

Naning, the leader of the subterranes who took over Ga Leung's body, phones "April" and tells her that his subterrane squad had already captured Ah Yan. But Yan is not "ripe" and cannot be "harvested". He then proposes an exchange of Yan's life with another "ripe" human. The trio decide to falsely compromise and save Yan while distracting Naning. They also meet an injured and lost Tat on the journey and Tat joins their operation. They break into the control room of the Sai Ying Pun Station, which is in fact a fortress built to defend the subterranes. "April" calls the K.L.D., the human organization that specifically handles subterranean affairs, for help and switches on the curses on the murals which can paralyze subterranes. However, Tat attacks the trio and reveals to be a planted mole of the K.L.D. who is working for the subterranes, and Tracy is killed in the process. Before Naning can harvest Wang, the K.L.D. blackops squad led by Ga Yin arrives and saves the protagonists. Yet the subterranes are too strong and firearms aren't effective to them, "April" decides to sacrifice herself and saves the humans with a suicidal explosion.

At last, Wang is visited by Ga Yin in the hospital, and is recruited to be part of the K.L.D. Wang hesitates at first, but ultimately accepts the offer in order to carry out "April"'s behest.

== Characters ==
- Leung Mo Wang (梁慕弘): nicknamed "Ah Wang" (阿弘), the protagonist of the story. A security guard of the Sai Ying Pun Station who is unexpectedly involved in the battle between humans and subterranes.
- "April": a subterrane who is looking for peace between the two races and secretly supported the K.L.D.'s activities.
- Uncle Tat (達叔): a senior staff of the Sai Ying Pun Station and the colleague of Ah Wang, who is secretly a planted mole in the K.L.D. and a spy of the subterrane.
- Naning (拿靈): the military leader of the subterrane who wants to attack the humans and takes over the Earth surface. Killed in the final explosion.
- Ah Yan (阿Yan): a high-school student and one of the five victims trapped in the Sai Ying Pun Station.
- Ga Yin (賈彥): a high-ranking member of the K.L.D.
- Ga Leung (賈亮): a NEET, the twin brother of Ga Yin and one of the five victims trapped in the Sai Ying Pun Station. Killed by Naning near the C2 Exit.
- Tracy: a flight attendant and one of the five victims trapped in the Sai Ying Pun Station. Killed and body taken over by "Tracy" in the fake Sai Ying Pun Station.
- Pak Gor (柏哥): a surgeon and one of the five victims trapped in the Sai Ying Pun Station. Killed by Ah Wang after he was transformed into a subterrane.
- "Tracy": a subterrane and the right-hand woman of Naning. Killed in the final explosion.
- Cheuk Ning (卓靈): the fiancée of Ah Wang.

== Concept and creation ==
In 2014, the construction of Sai Ying Pun Station was unexpectedly delayed after the two other new stations of the Extension of Island line to Western District went into service. At that time, Echo of Heart took a train ride to Sheung Wan, but overslept and found himself on the extension line. He was confused and curious about what led to the postponement as the station was seemingly operational. Inspired by the incident, he began to read about the history and urban legends related to Sai Ying Pun. However, as he was writing another story at that time, he did not start writing Sai Ying Pun until 2016. Echo of Heart wrote Sai Ying Pun in Cantonese, in order to raise awareness for preserving the language.

In 2016, Echo of Heart published the novel on Facebook and HKGolden and allowed the readers to vote for the next step of the protagonist in the posts with emoticons. The novel became viral on the internet with millions of hit rate and a total of 80,000 users were recorded reading the final chapter simultaneously when it was first released on HKGolden Forum. A paperback version was released in the same year, published by Idea Publication, and it became the bestselling book of several local bookstores, including The Commercial Press and Eslite Bookstore.

== Reception ==
Sai Ying Pun had a positive critical reception and was generally perceived as one of the most notable HKGolden web novels. The novel also received widespread acclaim on social media and book critic websites, winning in the humanities category at the 2016 Hong Kong Book Awards.

== Film adaptation ==
In 2016, a film adaptation was announced by Echo of Heart and pre-production had begun in the same year, which originally would make Sai Ying Pun the fifth HKGolden web novel to be adapted into film. Echo of Heart also announced that the casting of the lead actor would be a public vote on Facebook instead of an audition and popular nominations included Nicholas Tse, Louis Cheung, Babyjohn Choi and Neo Yau. However, the project was cancelled in 2020.
