= King George V Memorial Gardens =

King George V Memorial Gardens may refer to:

- King George V Memorial Gardens, Reading, England
- King George V Memorial Park, Hong Kong, Sai Ying Pun, Hong Kong
- King George V Memorial Park, Kowloon, Hong Kong
