= Sai Ying Pun station =

MTR station on Hong Kong Island

Sai Ying Pun 西營盤
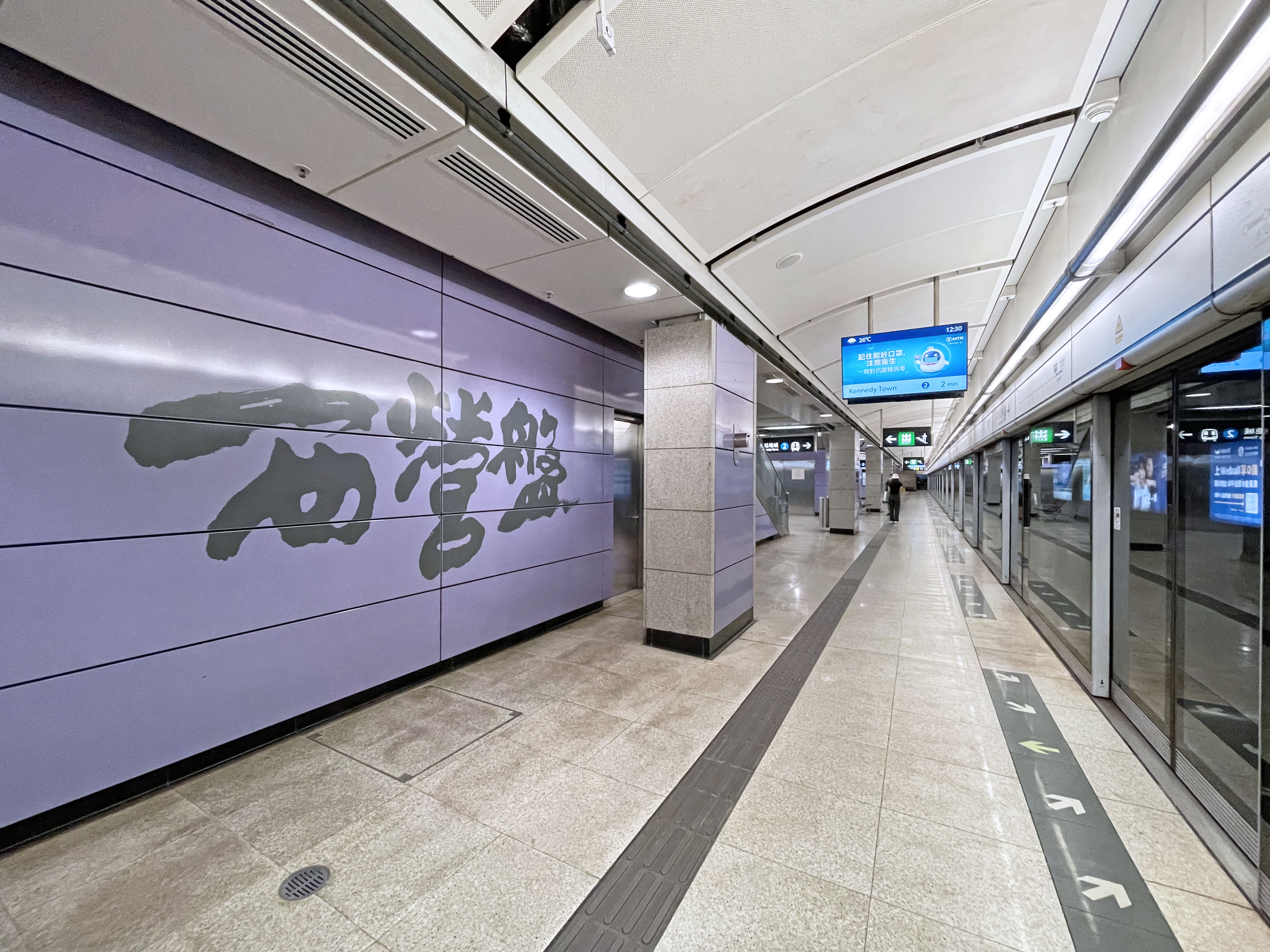
- Platform 2

Chinese name
- Traditional Chinese: 西營盤
- Simplified Chinese: 西营盘
- Hanyu Pinyin: Xīyíngpán
- Cantonese Yale: sai1 ying4 pun4
- Literal meaning: Western Barracks
Transcriptions
Standard Mandarin
- Hanyu Pinyin: Xīyíngpán
Yue: Cantonese
- Yale Romanization: sai1 ying4 pun4
- Jyutping: sai1 jing4 pun4

General information
- Location: Intersections between High Street, Centre Street, and Third Street, Sai Ying Pun; Central and Western District, Hong Kong
- Coordinates: 22°17′08″N 114°08′34″E
- System: MTR rapid transit station
- Owner: MTR Corporation
- Operator: MTR Corporation
- Line: Island line
- Platforms: 2 (1 island platform)
- Tracks: 2
- Connections: Tram; Bus, minibus

Construction
- Structure type: Underground
- Depth: 50 m (160 ft)
- Platform levels: 1
- Accessible: Yes
- Architect: Aedas

Other information
- Station code: SYP

History
- Opened: 29 March 2015; 11 years ago

Services
| Preceding station | MTR | Following station |
|---|---|---|
| HKU towards Kennedy Town | Island line | Sheung Wan towards Chai Wan |
Track layout
Location
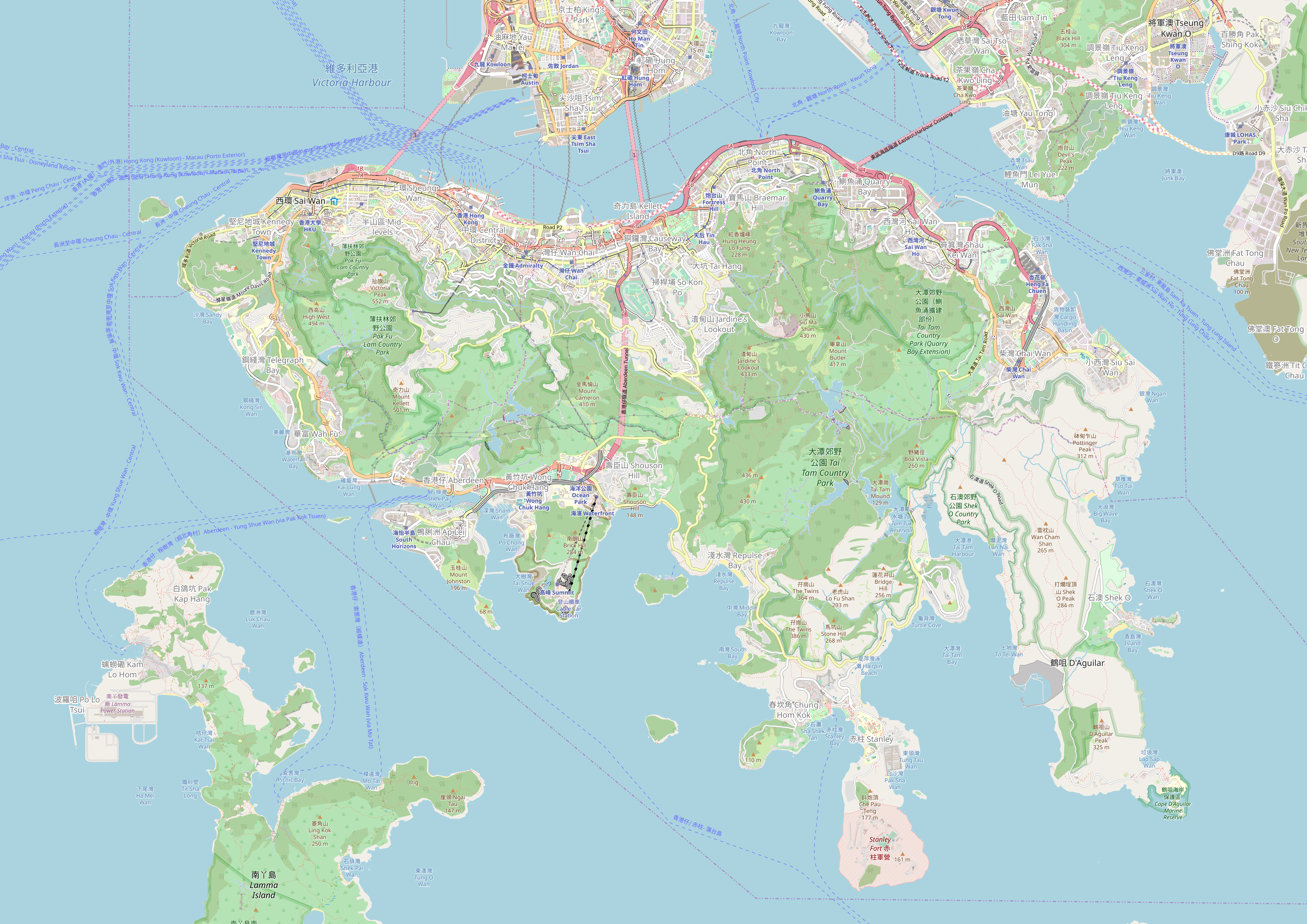
- Location within MTR Location within Hong Kong Island

Sai Ying Pun is a station on the MTR network. The station is located between HKU and Sheung Wan on the Island line. It serves the neighbourhood of Sai Ying Pun and the western part of Mid-Levels in northwestern Hong Kong Island, Hong Kong. Sai Ying Pun station was opened on 29 March 2015, completing the West Island line extension of the Island line.

== History ==
Plans for the station first appeared in Hong Kong Mass Transit: Further Studies in 1970. However, the Island line, built in the mid-1980s, did not include any stations west of Sheung Wan.

=== Proposed locations ===
In Outline Zoning Plan No. S/H3/20, the Planning Department of the government indicated one possible location under Des Voeux Road West at Ko Shing Street as of December 2003. A ventilation shaft marked with MTR notices can be found at the intersection. A large void facing Des Voeux Road West, sealed, can also be found at a nearby medical centre, which some have speculated that it was reserved for a to-be-built exit. These findings suggest that this was original proposed location.

However, in proposals submitted to the government by the MTR in May 2002, the proposed station was shifted further west to the intersection of Des Voeux Road West and Water Street.

In March 2004, the MTR moved the station back east but south of the initial alignment under King George V Memorial Park. A source from the MTR Corporation (MTRC) revealed to the local newspaper Ming Pao that this location was chosen to avoid any nuisance during works under major roads. The location would also better suit the needs of Mid-Levels residents, the source said.

=== Design and construction ===
The MTR Corporation let out a tender for the construction of the Sai Ying Pun and HKU stations and 2.2 km (1.4 mi) of tunnel. In 2009 the design and architecture work was awarded to Aedas in a joint venture with AECOM. In March 2010, it was awarded to a joint venture of Gammon Construction and Nishimatsu Construction (西松建設) for HK$4.7 billion. Construction commenced in 2010 and was completed in 2015. The station opened later than the other two on the West Island line due to construction delays resulting from soft ground conditions. Exit B3 construction was delayed for the same reason. Other elements of the construction included demolition of the Centre Street cooked food centre, the Ki Ling Lane children's playground, and the Whitty Street public toilet.

The station is home to a work of art entitled "Street Scenes of Sai Ying Pun", a collage of monochrome photos by artist Tse Ming-chong and the Hong Kong Youth Arts Foundation. It is located between the concourse and Exit B1/B2.

The pedestrian passage between Exit A and the concourse is very long, and has drawn complaints from some residents.

Island line western extension opened on 28 December 2014, but Sai Ying Pun station did not open until 29 March 2015.

== Station layout ==
| G | Ground level | Exits/Entrances |
| C | Concourse | Customer Service, MTRShops |
| P Platforms | Platform 1 | Island line towards Chai Wan (Sheung Wan) → |
| P Platforms | Island platform, doors will open on the right |
| P Platforms | Platform 2 | ← Island line towards Kennedy Town (HKU) |

=== Entrances and exits ===
Sai Ying Pun station has a total of 6 entrances/exits. Like its neighbouring HKU station, the station is characterised by the long corridors linking the concourse with the exits, due to the fact that the station box is located underneath the Mid-Levels.

- A1: Queen' Road West (near Sai Woo Lane), Ramada Hong Kong Harbour View, Tung Wah Hospital
- A2: Des Voeux Road West, Eco Tree Hotel, Sun Yat Sen Memorial Park, Sun Yat Sen Memorial Park Spotrs Centre, Sun Yat Sen Memorial Park Swimming Pool
- B1: First Street, Centre Street Market
- B2: Second Street, Sai Ying Pun Market, 1/F Centre Street Market, Island Crest
- B3: Ki Ling Lane (ArtLane), Andes Plaza, Third Street, Western District Headquarters and Police Station
- C: Bonham Road, David Trench Rehabilitation Centre, Sai Ying Pun Community Complex

Exit B3 (Ki Ling Lane) opened on 27 March 2016; its construction was delayed by difficult ground conditions. Lifts were opened for public use on 25 June 2016.

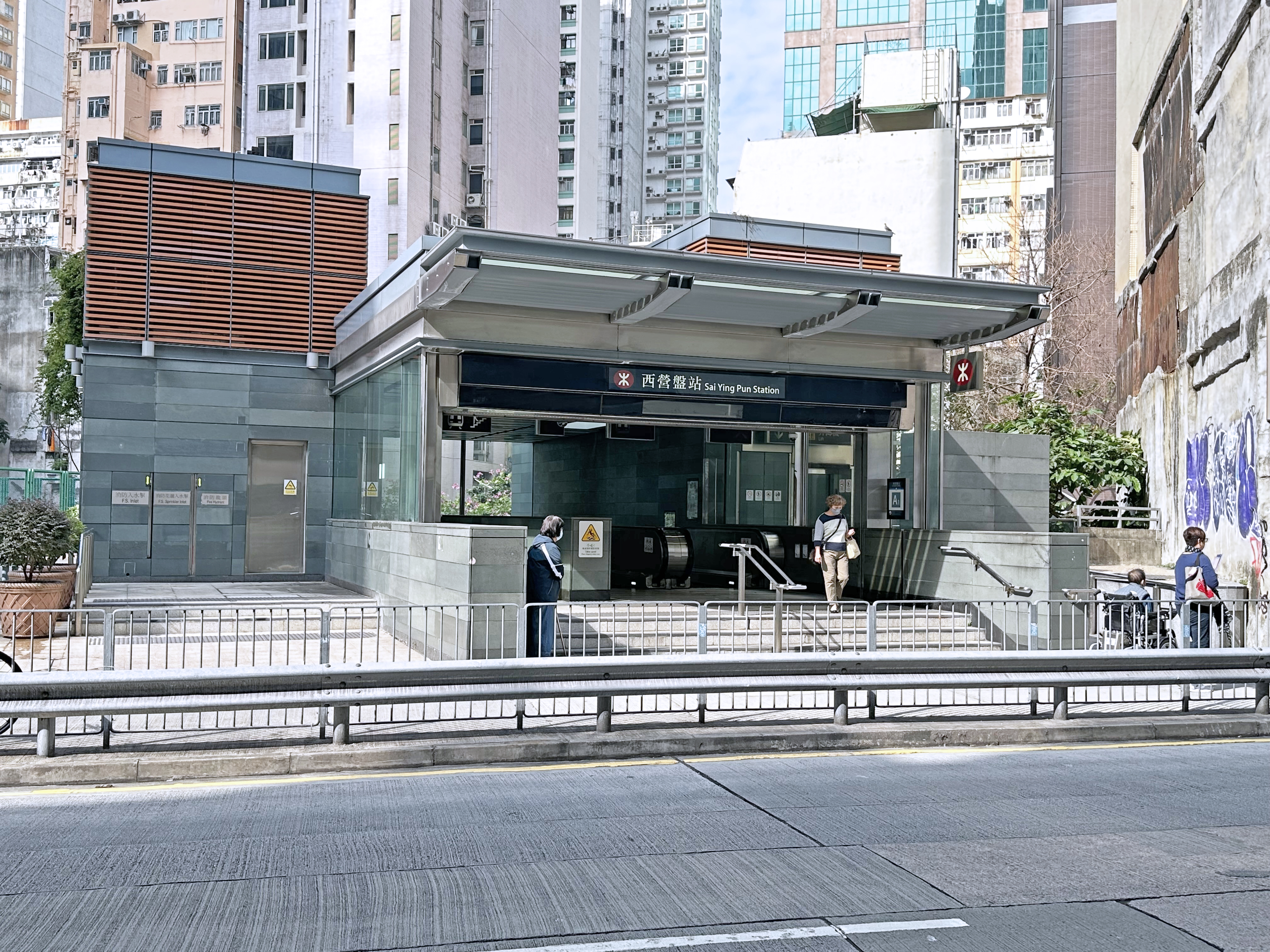
Entrance & Exit A1

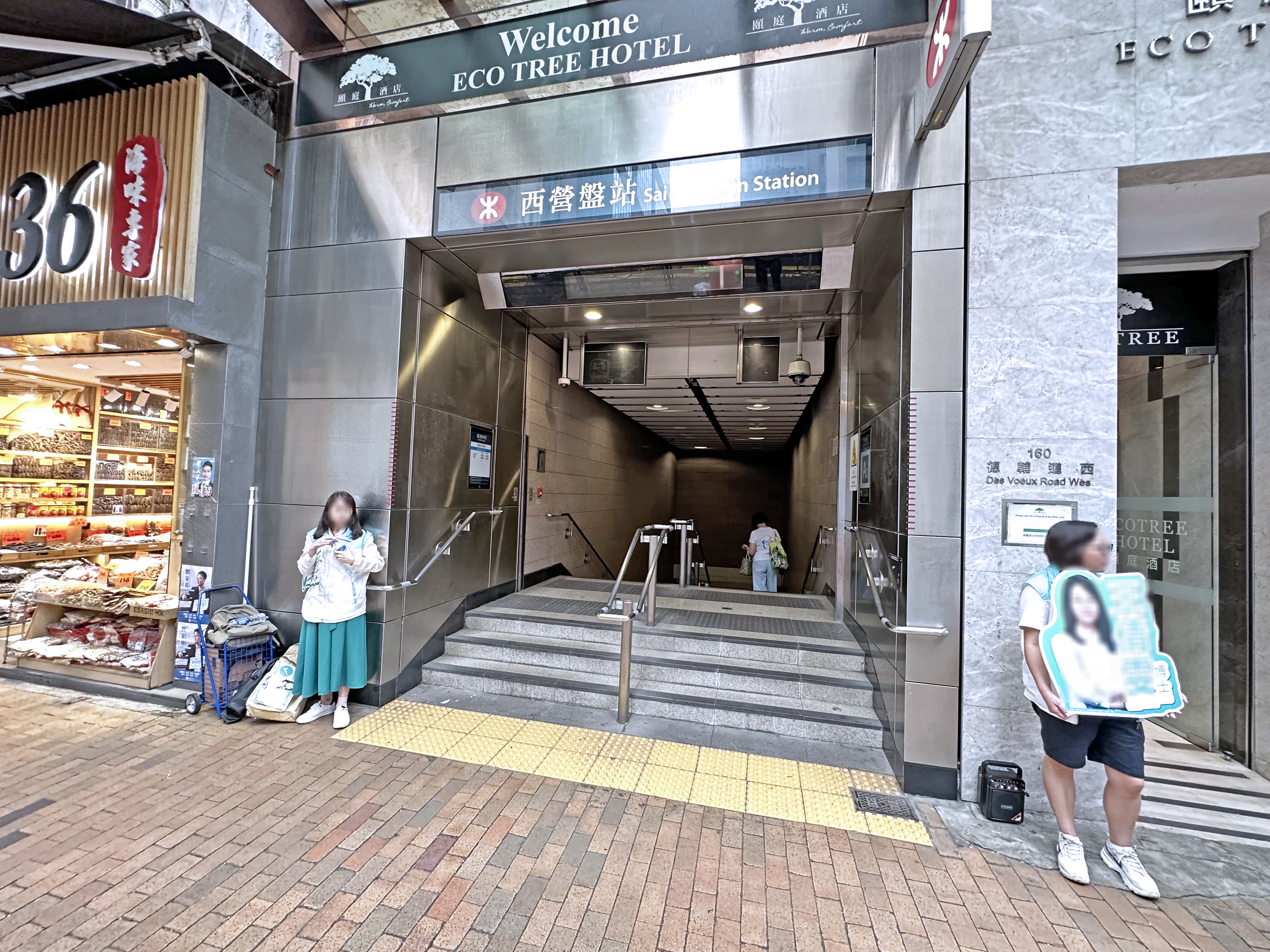
Entrance & Exit A2

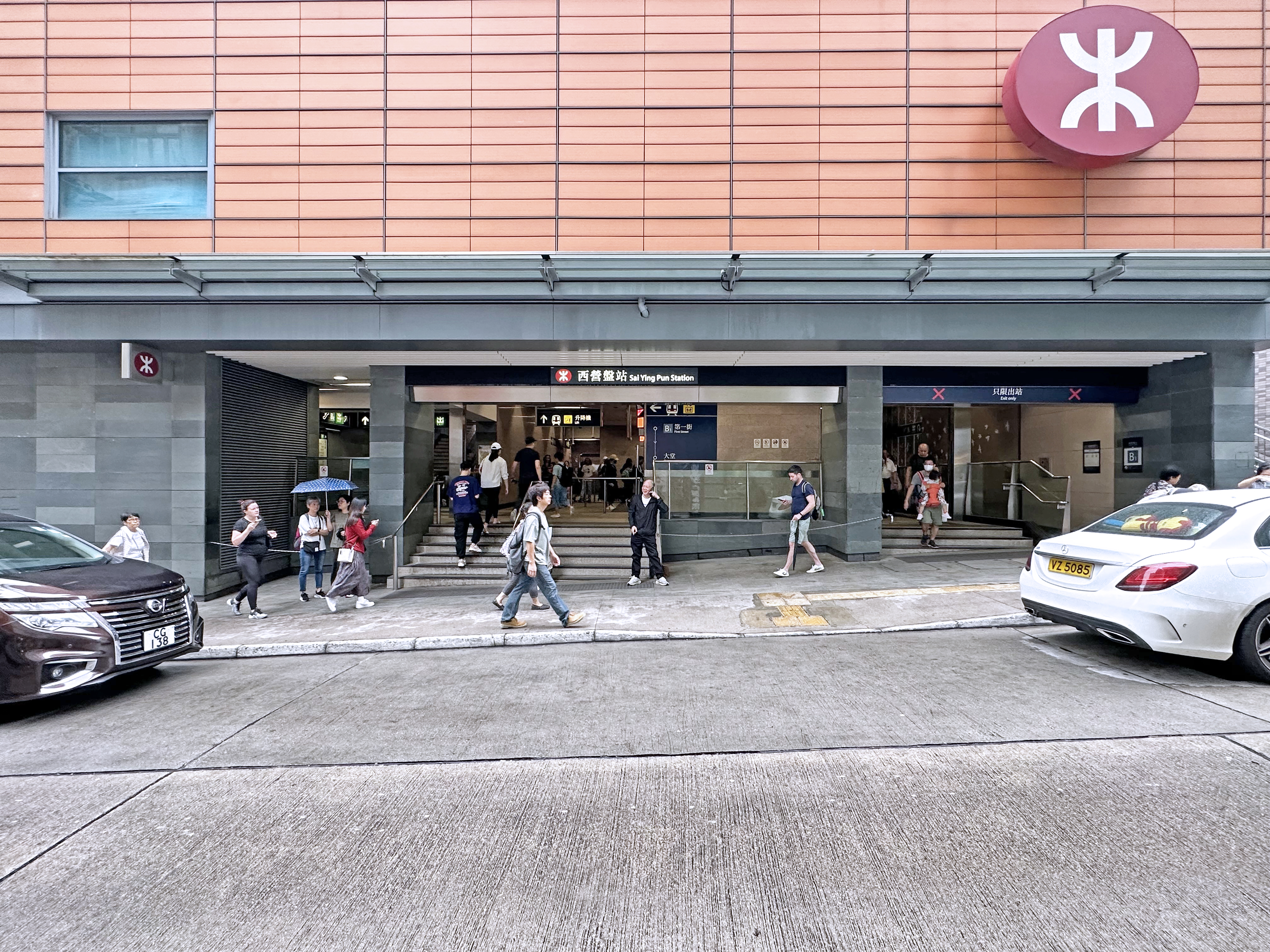
Entrance & Exit B1

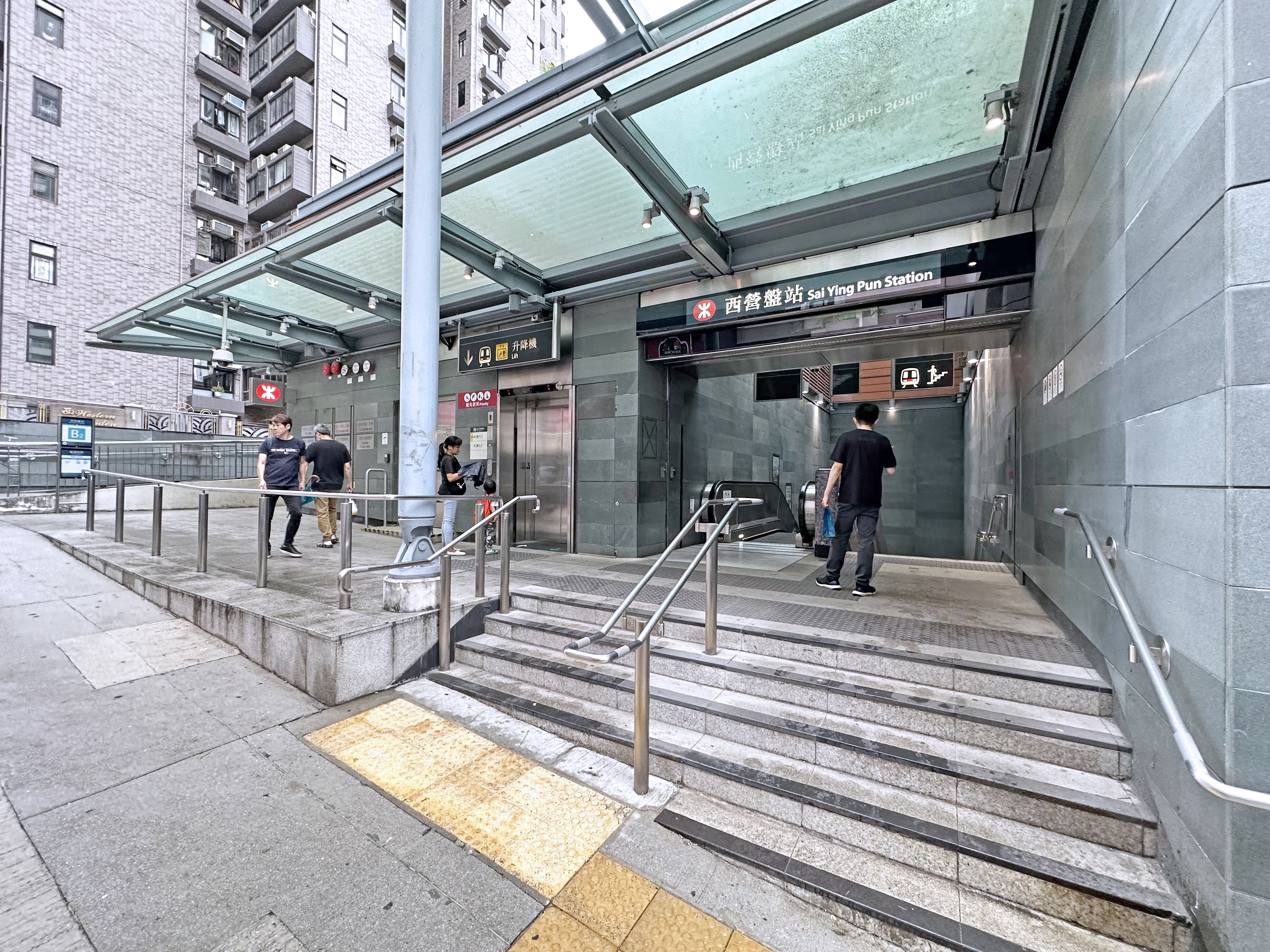
Entrance & Exit B2

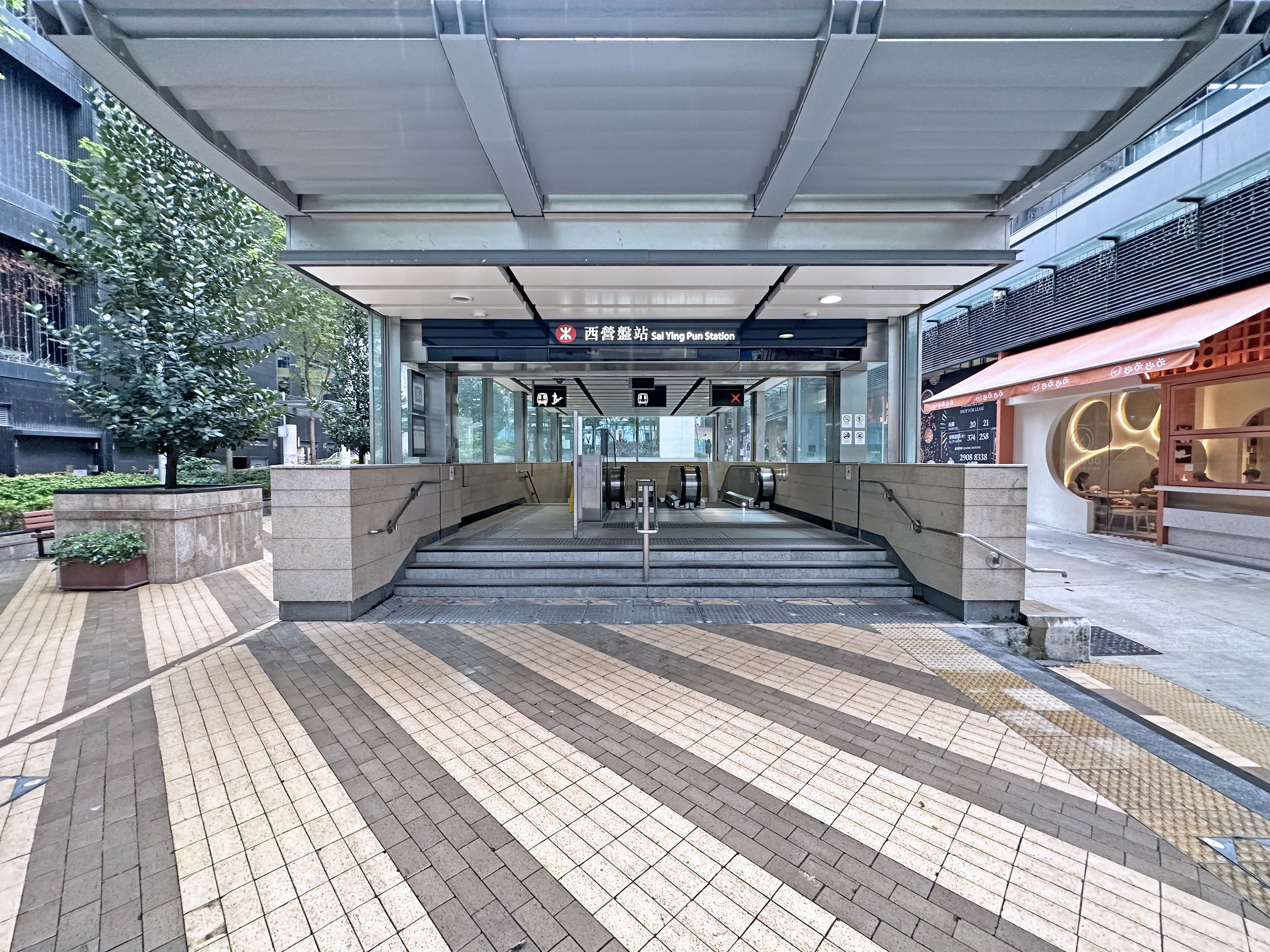
Entrance & Exit B3

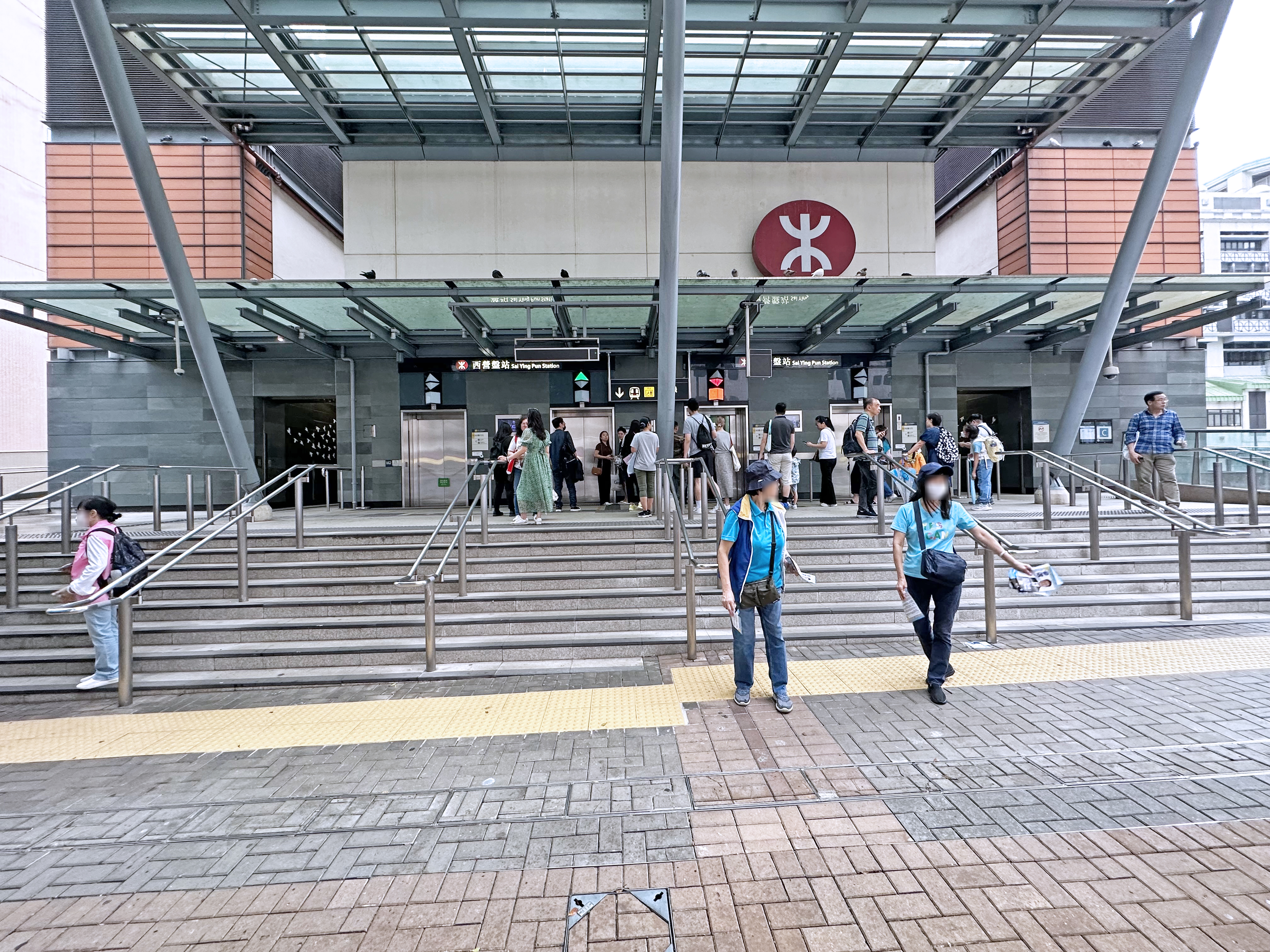
Entrance & Exit C

== In popular culture ==
Sai Ying Pun Station was used as a filming location for several blockbuster films, including Cold War 2.

Web novelist Echo of Heart had also wrote Sai Ying Pun, a horror fantasy based on the station's postponement in service and the urban legends of the neighbouring Whitty Station and Rumsey Station.
