= Extension of Island line to Western District =

Railway in Hong Kong

Extension of Island Line to Western District 港島綫西延

Overview
- Locale: Districts: Central and Western
- Termini: Sheung Wan; Kennedy Town
- Stations: 3

Service
- Type: Heavy rail (rapid transit)
- System: MTR

History
- Opened: HKU and Kennedy Town: 28 December 2014; Sai Ying Pun: 29 March 2015

Technical
- Track gauge: 1,435 mm (4 ft 8 1/2 in)
- Electrification: 1.5 kV DC
Route map

The Extension of Island line to Western District (previously known as West Island line) is a three-station western extension of the Hong Kong MTR's Island line. Construction of the line began on 10 August 2009, and the two westernmost stations on line opened on 28 December 2014; the intermediary Sai Ying Pun station opened on 29 March 2015. The first train went into service that day at 6:00 a.m. Hong Kong time.

== History ==
=== Initial proposals ===
The MTR Corporation Limited (MTRC) submitted its first proposal for the West Island line in May 2002. This was similar to the final alignment, with stations at Sai Ying Pun, Belcher and Kennedy Town. In revisions in 2003 and 2004, the West Island line became its own line, which would interchange with the Island line at Sheung Wan or Sai Ying Pun. On 28 May 2004, planning for the line was deferred.

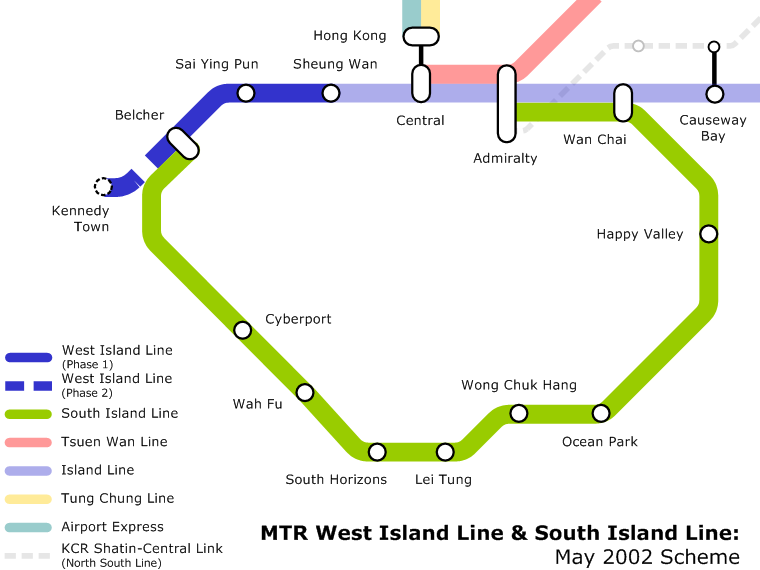
Alignment of Original Scheme

=== Final scheme ===
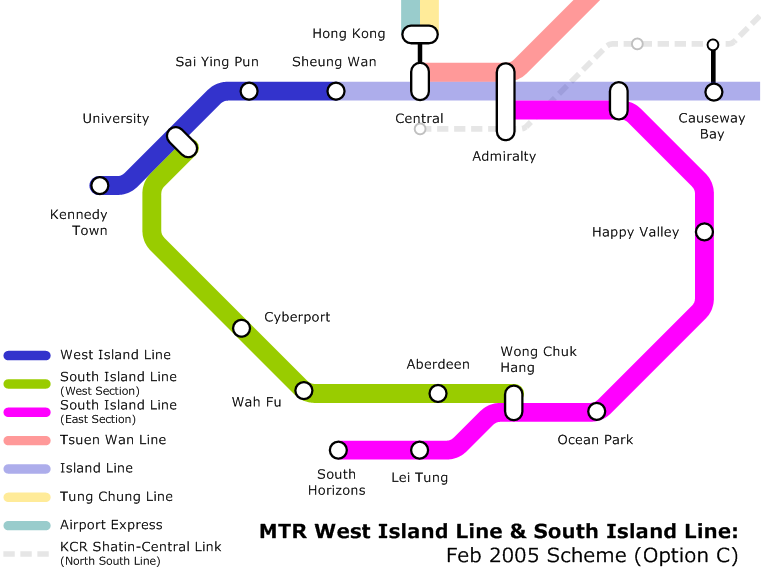
Alignment of the final scheme

On 25 February 2005, the Panel of Transport of Legislative Council had a meeting discussing the West and South Island lines. MTR submitted a revised scheme on 22 February. An introduction to the scheme was conducted in the meeting.

In the scheme, the West Island line included only the extension to Island line. The rest became the west section of South Island line. The Extension of Island line to Western District would run from Sheung Wan to Kennedy Town:

- Sheung Wan
- Sai Ying Pun
- HKU, interchange to the South Island Line (West)
- Kennedy Town

The scheme was gazetted in October 2007 and given final authorisation in March 2009. Construction of the 3-kilometre extension started on 10 August 2009, for completion in 2014. The cost of the extension is estimated to be HK$15.4 billion.

== Project details ==
=== Construction cost ===
The summary report of the new lines estimated the construction cost for extending the Island Line to the Western District to be HK$15.4 billion as of December 2008. MTR requested government funding for less than half of the total cost, with the remaining construction and operational expenses to be covered by MTR.

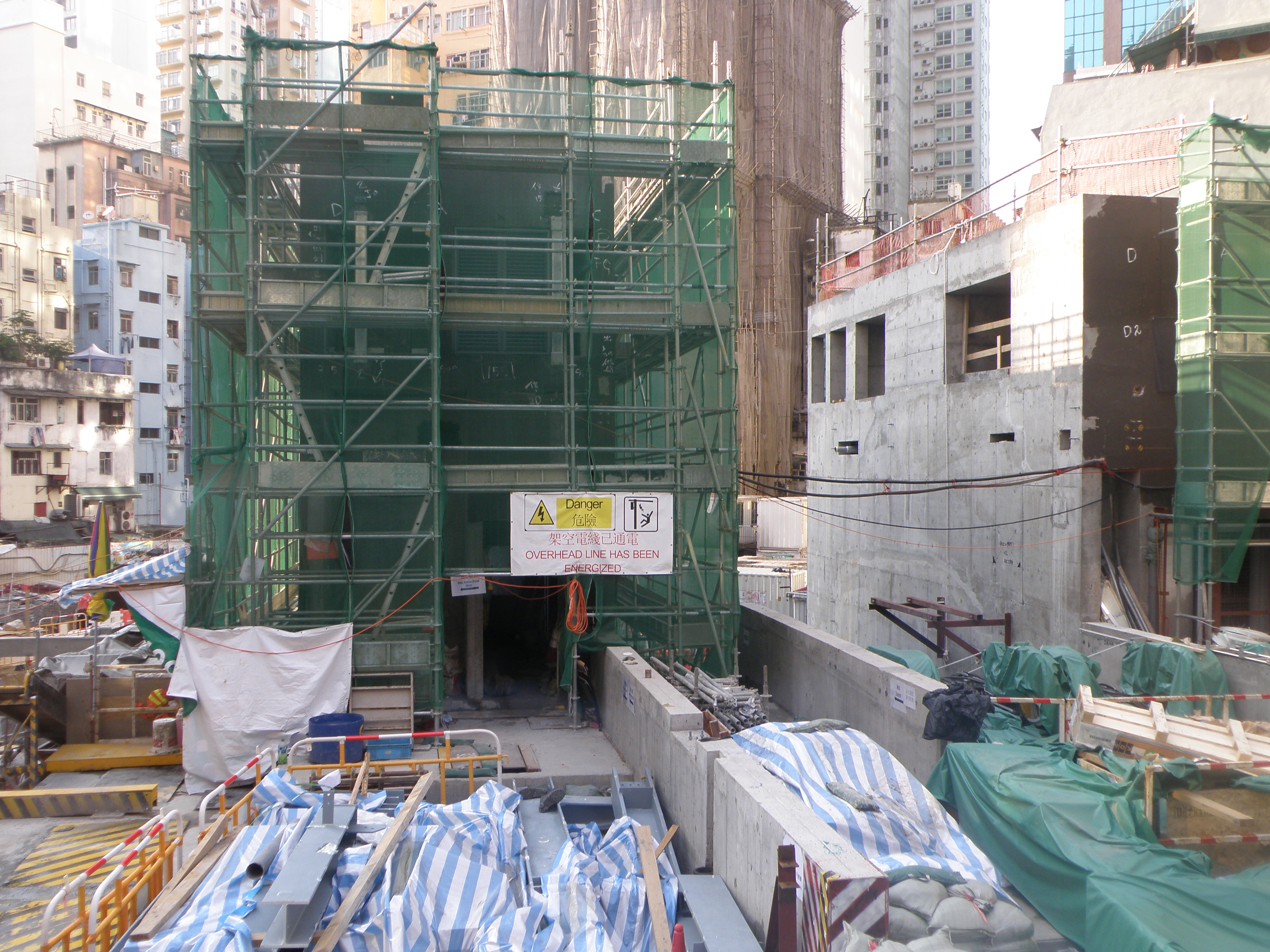
Sai Ying Pun station Exit A1 in April 2014

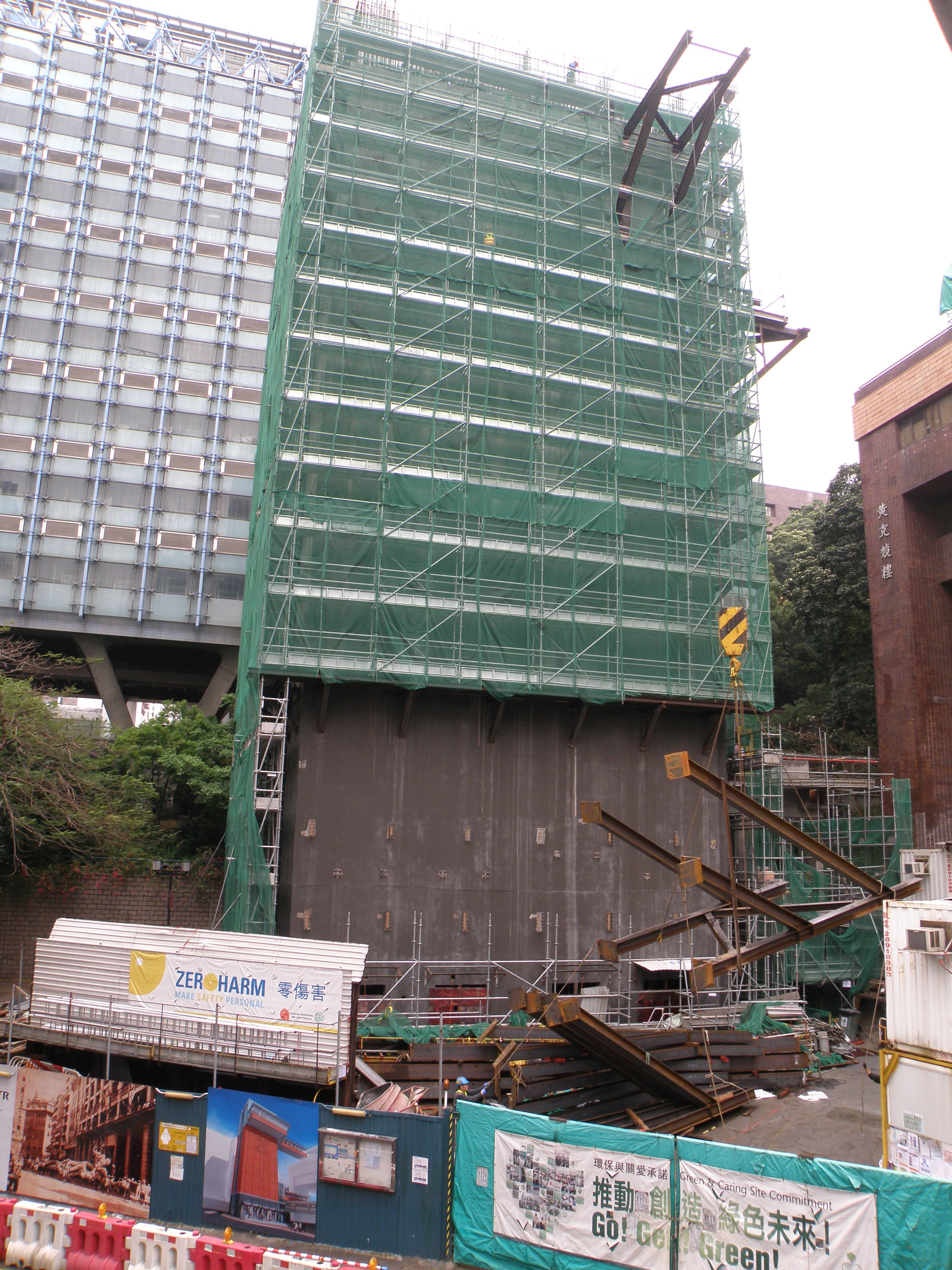
Under construction HKU station Exit A

== Features ==
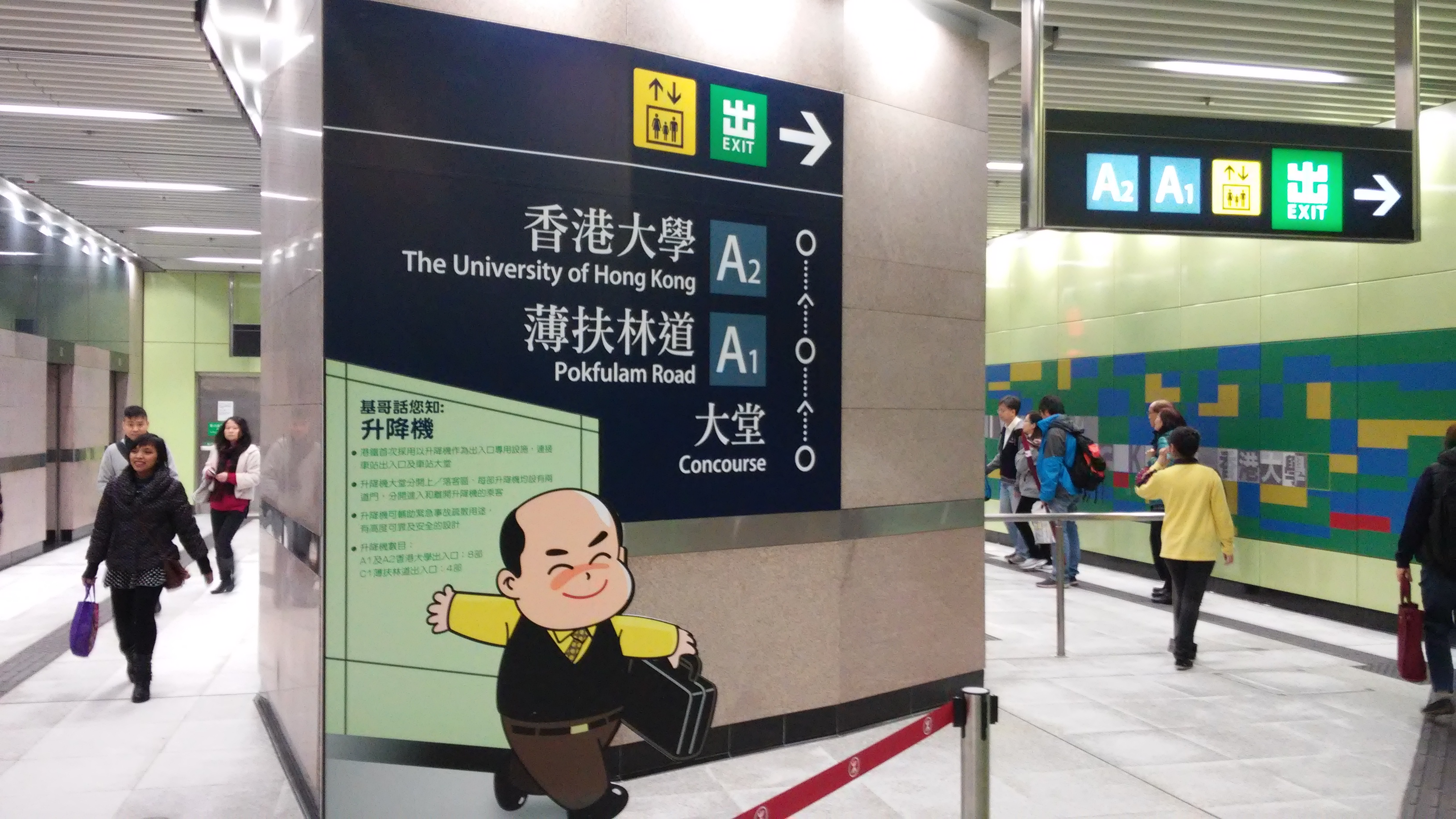
One of the "lift-only" exits at HKU

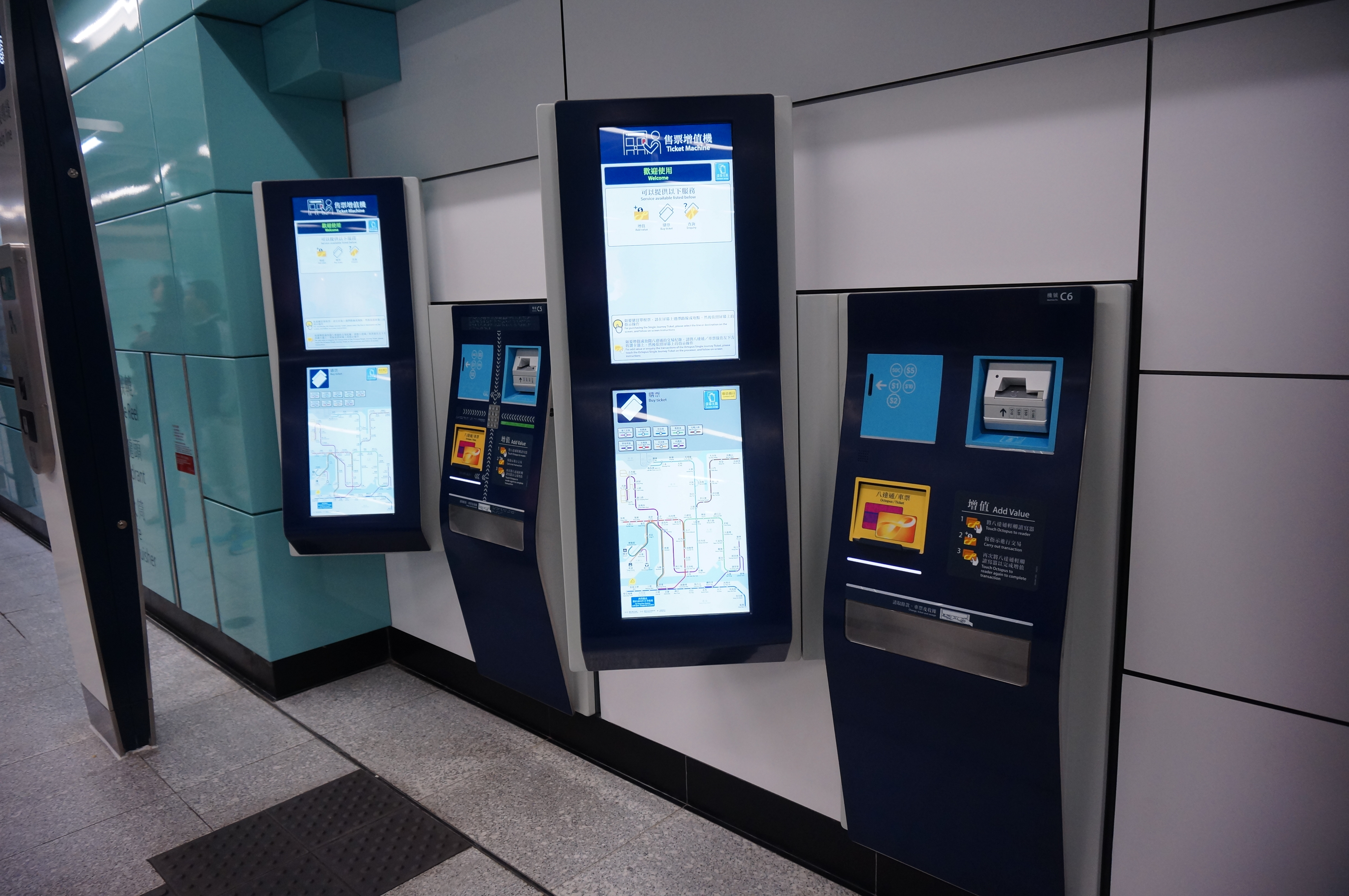
New Ticket Machines at Kennedy Town

These new stations incorporate features aimed at enhancing services and facilities for passengers. Lift-only entrances have been implemented at HKU and Sai Ying Pun stations, due to their significant depth. These entrances feature multiple high-speed lifts equipped with doors on both sides, enabling transportation of a large number of passengers entering and exiting the stations.

In the event of a fire, these lifts can also serve as evacuation routes. To ensure safety, fire shutters are installed for each lift, which can be lowered, and the air within the lifts can be pressurized to prevent the infiltration of smoke and fire.

New multi-purpose ticket machines are installed in the concourse. Using touch screens, they combine the existing functions of ticket vending machine and add-value machine. They can also be used to purchase single journey and City Saver tickets by cash or Octopus card.

== See also ==
- MTR
- Future projects of the MTR
- South Island line
