= Island line (MTR) =

Hong Kong MTR railway line

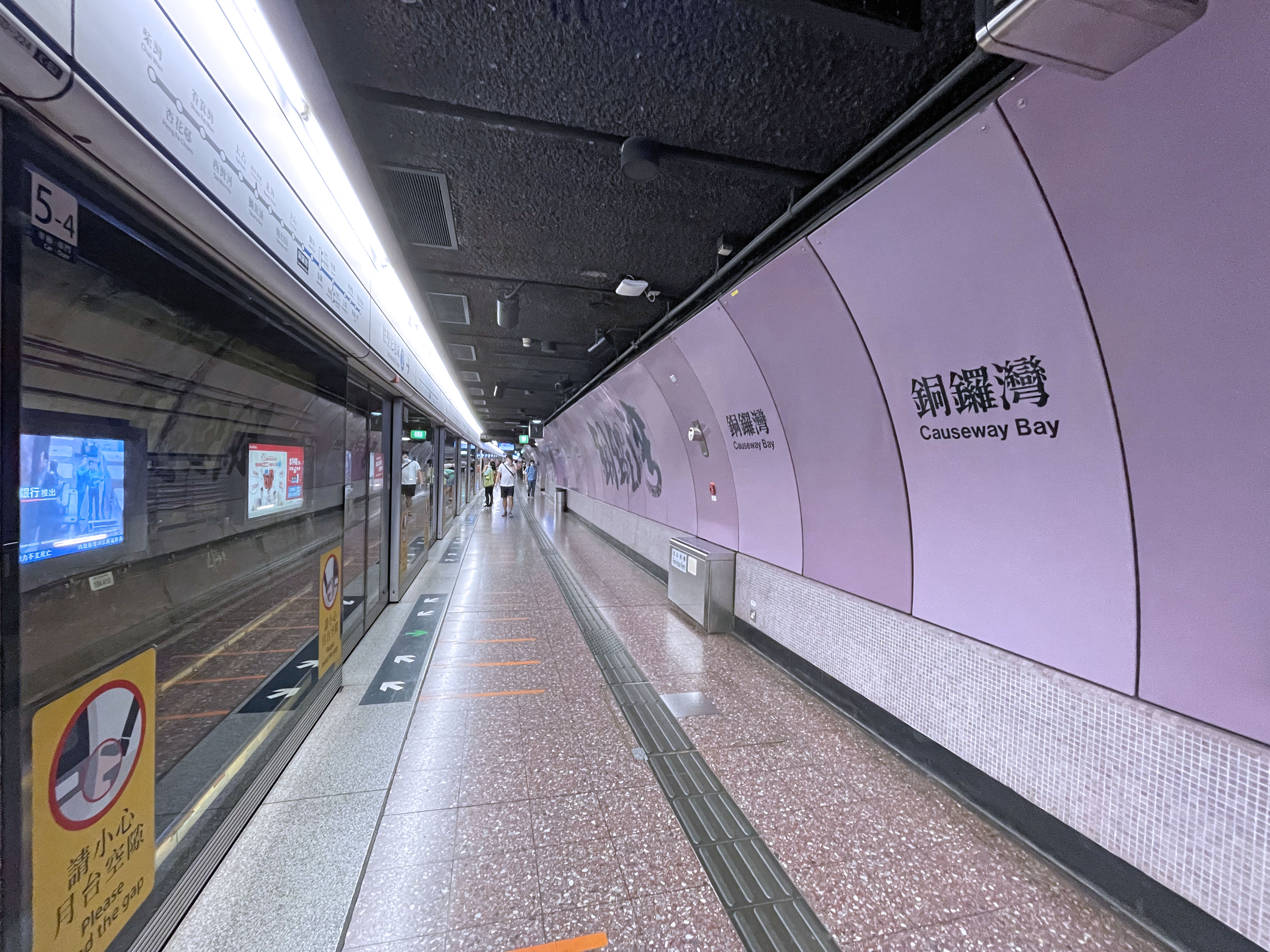
- Platform 2 to Kennedy Town at Causeway Bay station

Overview
- Native name: 港島綫
- Status: Operational
- Owner: MTR Corporation
- Locale: Districts: Eastern, Wan Chai, Central & Western
- Termini: Kennedy Town; Chai Wan
- Connecting lines: ■ East Rail line (Via Admiralty); ■ South Island line (Via Admiralty); ■ Tseung Kwan O line (Via North Point, Quarry Bay); ■ Tsuen Wan line (Via Central, Admiralty); ■ Tung Chung line (Via Hong Kong-Central); ■ Airport Express (Via Hong Kong-Central); ■ South Island line (West) (Via HKU; proposed)
- Former connections: ■ Kwun Tong line
- Stations: 17
- Color on map: Dark blue (#007DC5)

Service
- Type: Rapid transit
- System: MTR
- Depot: Chai Wan
- Rolling stock: Metro Cammell EMU (DC); CRRC Qingdao Sifang EMU
- Ridership: 947,100 daily average (weekdays, September 2014)

History
- Work began: December 1980; 45 years ago
- Opened: 31 May 1985; 41 years ago
- Last extension: 28 December 2014; 11 years ago (Extension of Island line to Western District); 29 March 2015; 11 years ago (Opening of Sai Ying Pun)
- Completed: 23 May 1986; 40 years ago

Technical
- Line length: 14,925 m (9.274 mi)
- Track length: 16.3 km (10.1 mi)
- Number of tracks: Double-track
- Track gauge: 1,432 mm (4 ft 8 3/8 in) (Chai Wan to Sheung Wan); 1,435 mm (4 ft 8 1/2 in) standard gauge (West Island Line)
- Electrification: 1,500 V DC (Overhead line)
- Operating speed: Average: 33 km/h (21 mph); Maximum: 80 km/h (50 mph)
- Signalling: Advanced SelTrac CBTC (2027)
- Train protection system: SACEM (currently being replaced)
- Average inter-station distance: 525 m (1,722 ft)
Route map

Island line
- Traditional Chinese: 港島綫
- Simplified Chinese: 港岛线
- Cantonese Yale: Góng dóu sin
Transcriptions
Standard Mandarin
- Hanyu Pinyin: Gǎngdǎo xiàn
Yue: Cantonese
- Yale Romanization: Góng dóu sin
- Jyutping: Gong^{2} dou^{2} sin^{3}

The Island line (Chinese: 港島綫) is one of ten lines of the MTR, the mass transit system in Hong Kong. It runs from Kennedy Town in the Western district to Chai Wan in the Eastern District on Hong Kong Island. It passes through the territory's major business districts of Central, Wan Chai and Causeway Bay, and connects them with built-up areas on the north shore of the island.

The line first opened on 31 May 1985. As of 2022 it travels 16.3 kilometres (10.1 mi) in 25 minutes along its route, serving 17 stations.

== History ==
The origins of the proposal for the line came from the 1967 and 1970 studies, which has the line initially planned to run from Kennedy Town to Chai Wan.

The Hong Kong Government authorised the construction of the 13.1-kilometre-long (8.1 mi) Island line in December 1980, after rejecting plans to extend the tram eastwards to Chai Wan. The section between Sheung Wan and Kennedy did not proceed to construction.

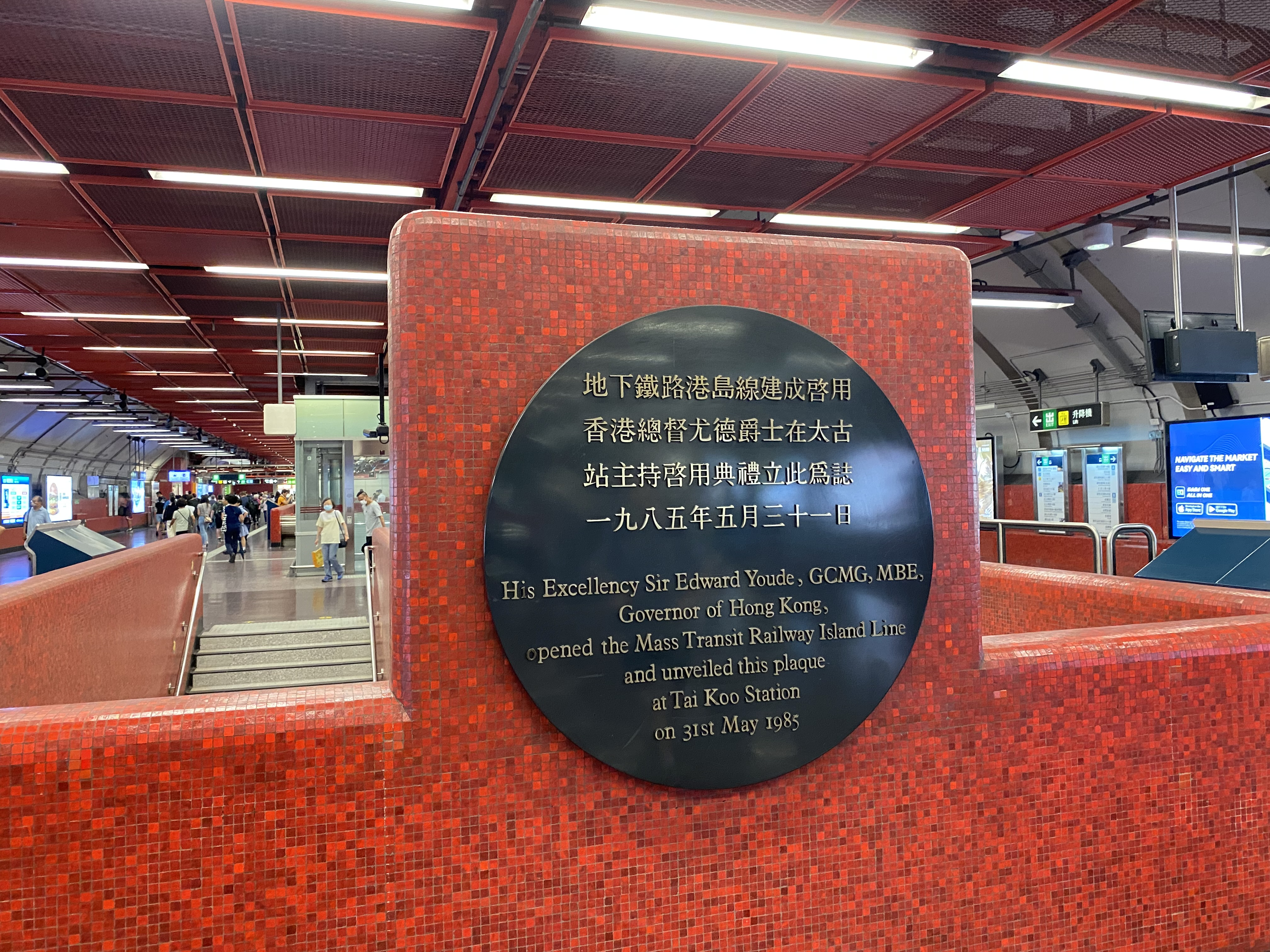
Plaque of MTR Island line opening ceremony held at Tai Koo station on 31 May 1985 by Sir Edward Youde, then governor of Hong Kong.

On 31 May 1985 the Island line opened with services operating between Admiralty and Chai Wan stations with trains in six-car configuration. The opening ceremony was held at Tai Koo station and was officiated by then-MTR chairman Sir Wilfrid Newton and Governor of Hong Kong Sir Edward Youde, who unveiled the commemorative plaques at the station concourse.

On 23 May 1986, the Island line was extended to Central and Sheung Wan stations. Both Admiralty and Central stations became interchange stations with the Tsuen Wan line. As part of this extension, trains were lengthened to eight cars.

=== Quarry Bay Congestion Relief ===
After the Kwun Tong line was extended to Quarry Bay station through the Eastern Harbour Crossing on 1 October 1989, that station became an interchange station with the Island line. There is no cross-platform arrangement, and passengers relied on escalators and a long passageway to change between these lines. In a response to the resulting congestion, the government recommended the Quarry Bay Congestion Relief Works project, and proceeded to expand North Point station to become the second interchange with the Kwun Tong line, with construction starting in July 1998.

The North Point interchange opened on 27 September 2001, and the cross-platform interchange reduced the time required to interchange from five minutes at Quarry Bay station to less than one minute. On 4 August 2002, both these stations became interchange stations with the new Tseung Kwan O line which had taken over the harbour crossing section from the Kwun Tong line.

=== Western extension ===
In 2002, the MTRC announced that it would use HK$300 million to construct the West and South Island lines, provided that the Government would award subsidies towards the project. Soon after in May 2002, the first proposal from the MTRC detailed a western extension of the existing Island line towards Kennedy Town. However the plan was abruptly brought to a halt due to land reclamation obstacles on the western coast of Hong Kong Island, and the enormous cost and uncertainties concerning the Hong Kong Government's subsidies for the project. However, the current plan for the new lines to the Southern District would require parts of the Western extension in order for it to be completed. As a result, the MTR Corporation was conducting extensive surveys as well as public forums to gather opinion and suggestions concerning the alignment of the extension and location of the Sai Ying Pun, Shek Tong Tsui and Kennedy Town stations for the West Island line.

Construction commenced on the Island line's western extension to Kennedy Town in 2009. The extension opened to passenger services on 28 December 2014, providing direct heavy rail connection to the western district of Hong Kong Island for the first time. New intermediate stations at Sai Ying Pun and the University of Hong Kong also opened as part of the extension; however, construction delayed the opening of Sai Ying Pun station to 29 March 2015.

== Rolling stock ==
MTR Island Line Rolling stock
Model	Manufactured	Time of manufacturing	Sets	Assembly	Notes
M-Train	Metro-Cammell	1977-1986; 1989-1995	28	A-C+D+B-C+D+C-A	To be replaced by the new Q-Trains
Q-Train	CRRC Qingdao Sifang	2017–present	12	A-C-B+B-C+B-C-A	To replace all the M-Trains
MTR Island Line Former rolling stock
Model	Manufactured	Time of manufacturing	Sets	Assembly	Notes
K-Train	Hyundai Rotem and Mitsubishi Heavy Industries	2001-2002	N/A	A-C-B+B-C+B-C-A	now used on Tseung Kwan O line

== Route description ==
The Island line resembles the deep-level lines of the London Underground, as most of the route and stations along the line are deep underground and consist of cylindrical tunnels. This was the result of a lack of available land, as the construction plans for the line required it to be built under major roads.

Only the segment of the line east of Shau Kei Wan has space for track expansion and the line emerges to the surface at Heng Fa Chuen, and then continues on a viaduct, which runs alongside Shing Tai Road, passing over Chai Wan Park and the Island Eastern Corridor above ground, all the way to Chai Wan.

The route of the original underground section of the line is also served by Hong Kong Tramways at surface level (the West Island line extension follows its own routing further inland from the tramway). This brought concerns that the tram system might be abolished when the MTR line was to be built. However a decision to save the tramline was made in 1980, and it serves as a backup in the event of service breakdown and a cheaper alternative for shorter journeys.

Because of the depth of the line, most underground stations on this line have curved walls on the platforms, which is due to the route's cylindrical tunnels, only with a greater diameter. Of the underground stations not bearing this feature, Tai Koo station is itself a large tube containing both the concourse and the platform, Sai Ying Pun station and HKU station consist of station boxes that are themselves, also tube-like though flatter, while Shau Kei Wan, Admiralty, Central and Kennedy Town stations were built using the cut-and-cover method.

As many stations follow the curvature of the roads which they were built under, many of the platforms are curved, resulting in large platform gaps. The few stations where the platforms are otherwise relatively straight are those on the West Island line as well as North Point, Quarry Bay, Tai Koo, Heng Fa Chuen and Chai Wan. Also, due to constraints, the platforms of Wan Chai, Causeway Bay, Tin Hau and Sai Wan Ho are stacked. This also separates the platform and concourse into different levels, so there are passageways and long escalators at those stations to link the platform and concourse.

All Island line stations except Heng Fa Chuen and Chai Wan have their Chinese station names written in Chinese calligraphy as part of the stations' design. A retired architect involved in designing the Island line, Abe Au Kit-tong, explained that the calligraphy is written in large fonts to alleviate the psychological effect caused by the narrow platforms and the curvature of the walls, in addition to reminding passengers what the stop is. This is why Heng Fa Chuen and Chai Wan stations do not have calligraphy forming part of their design, as they are built above ground. This feature is also found in some newer MTR stations on the Tseung Kwan O line, the Tuen Ma line, East Rail line and the Kwun Tong line.

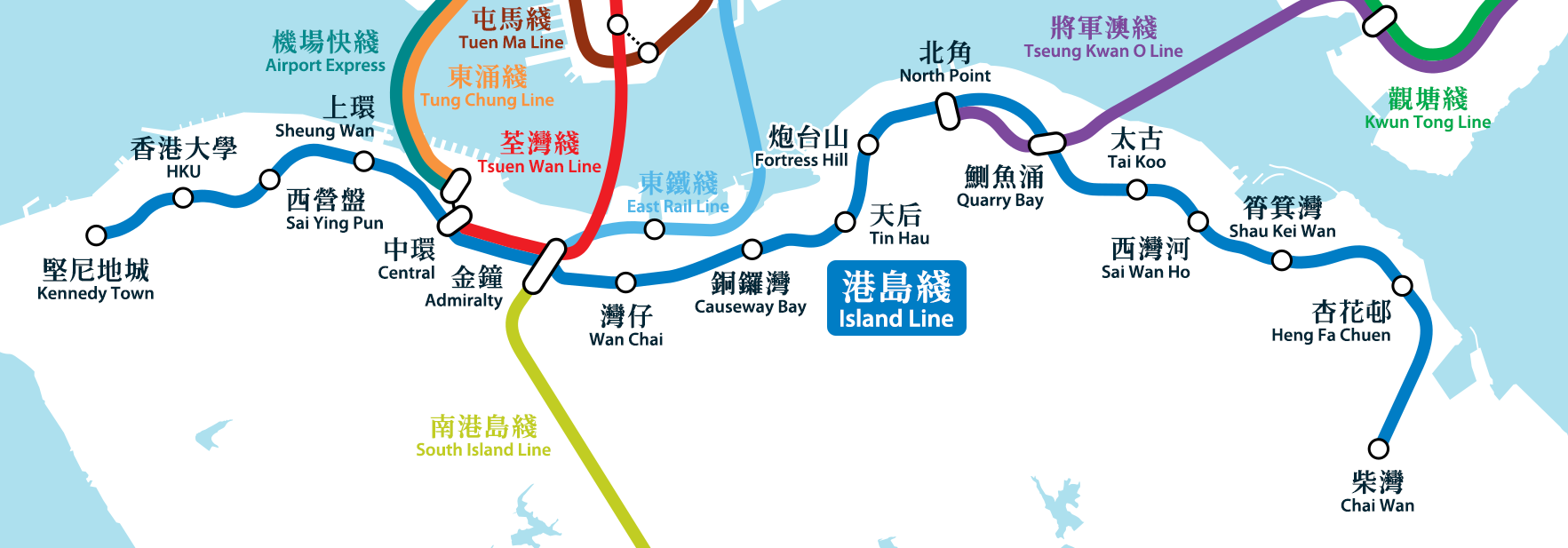
Geographically accurate map of the MTR Island line

== Gallery ==
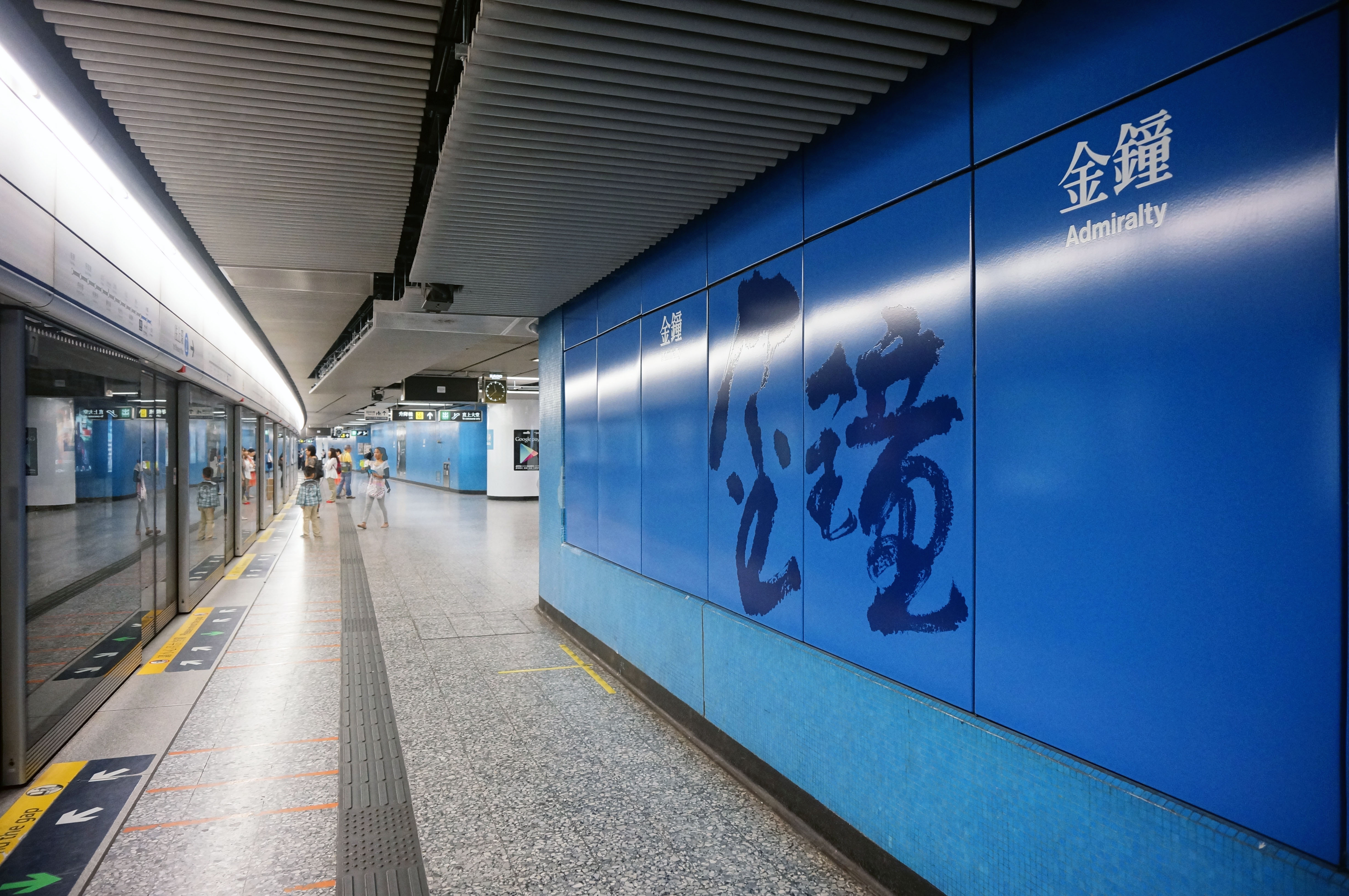
Admiralty station, Island line platform

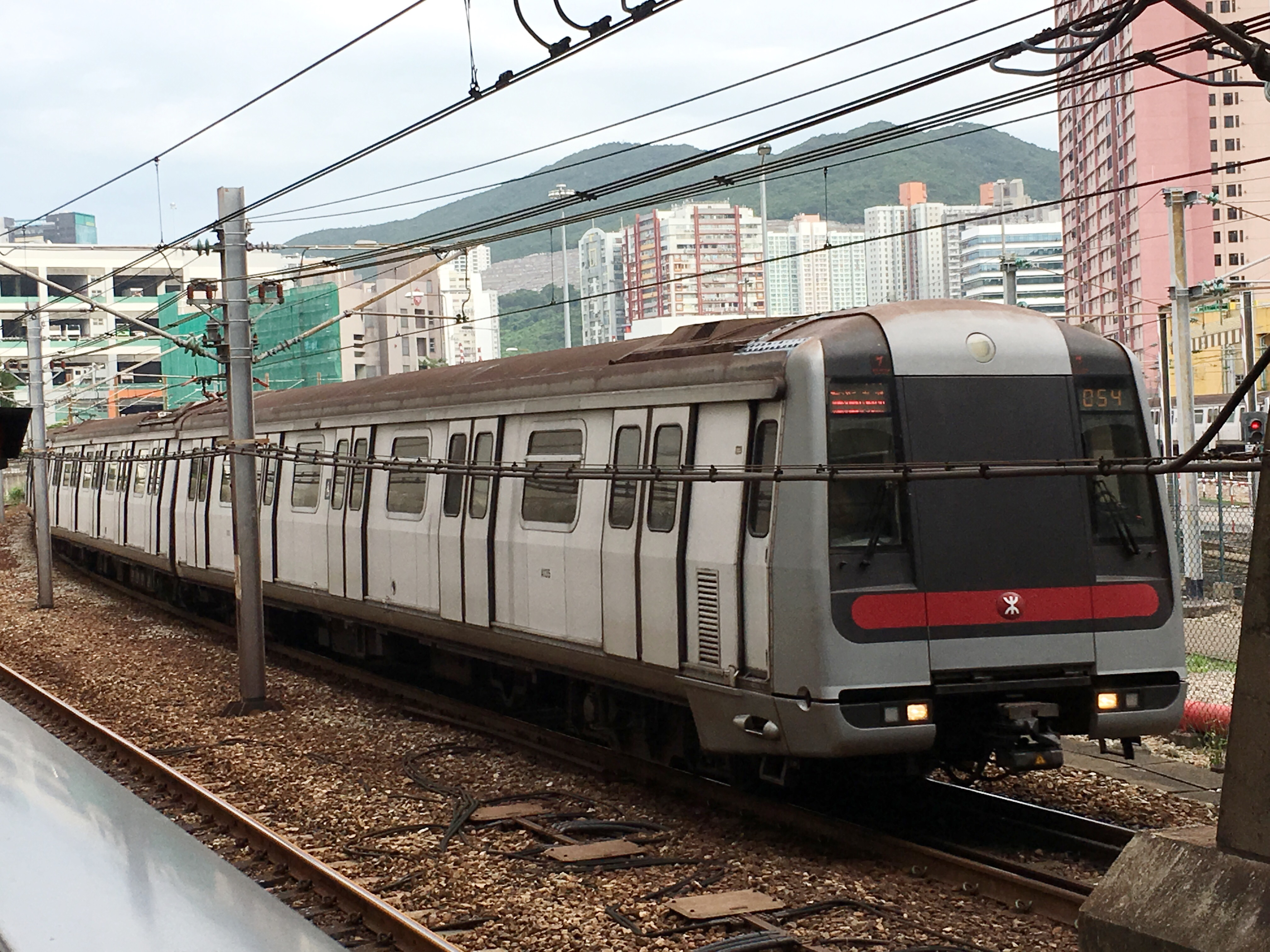
Train approaching Heng Fa Chuen station

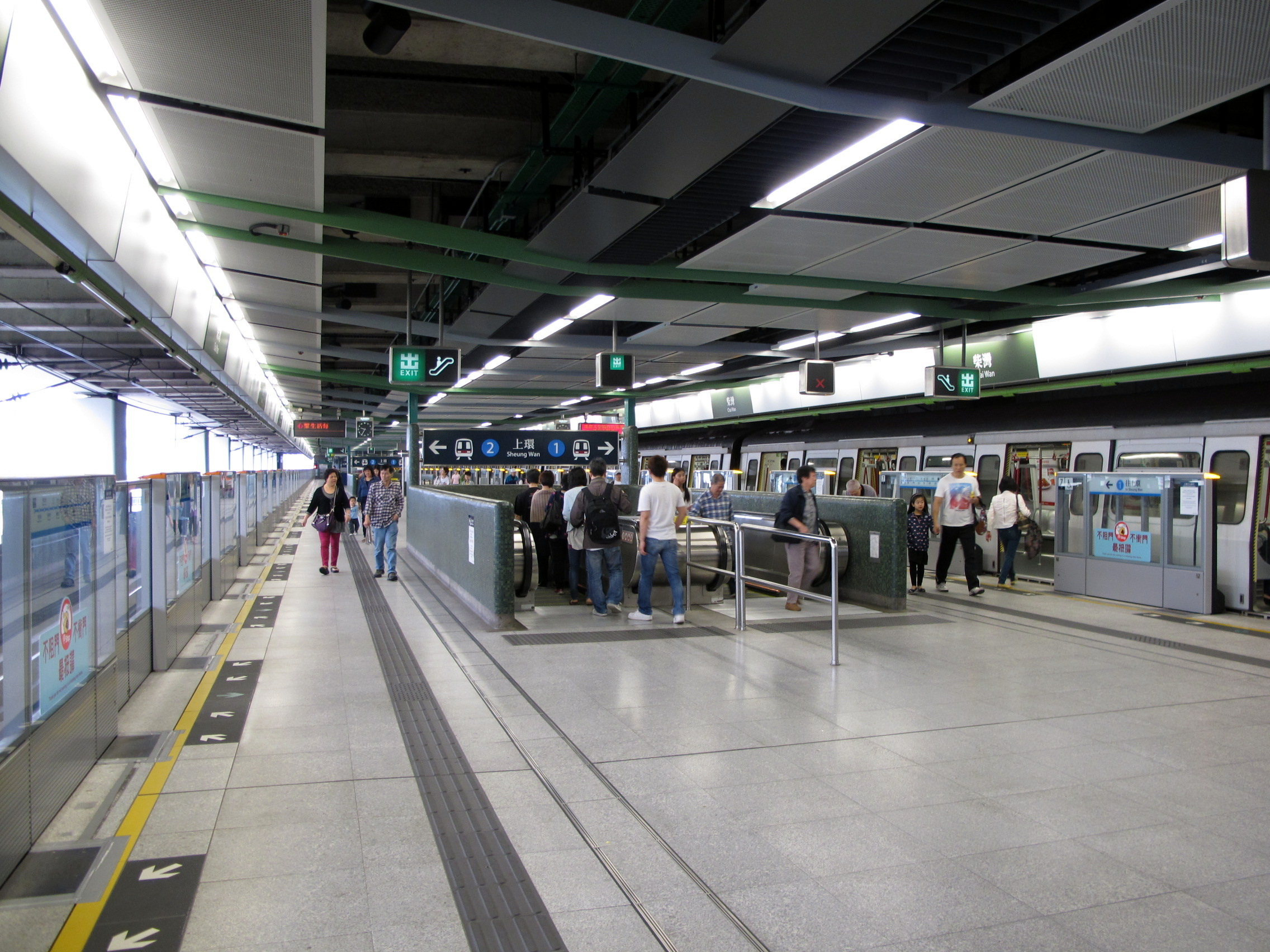
A train waiting to depart from Chai Wan station, terminus of the Island line

== Stations ==
This is a list of the stations on the Island line.

List of Island line stations
Livery	Station name		Images	Length (km)	Interchange; Adjacent transport	Opening	District
Livery	English	Chinese	Images	Length (km)	Interchange; Adjacent transport	Opening	District
Island Line (ISL)
	Kennedy Town	堅尼地城		0.0	—N/a	28 December 2014; 11 years ago	Central and Western
	HKU	香港大學		0.8	South Island (West) (proposed)	28 December 2014; 11 years ago	Central and Western
	Sai Ying Pun	西營盤		1.6	—N/a	29 March 2015; 11 years ago	Central and Western
	Sheung Wan	上環		2.7	—N/a	23 May 1986; 40 years ago	Central and Western
	Central (Note: Tsuen Wan line part originally opened as Chater station.)	中環		3.5	Tsuen Wan line Hong Kong: Tung Chung line Airport Express	12 February 1980; 46 years ago (Note: Originally opened as part of the Modified Initial System.) (Note: Island line platforms opened on 31 May 1985 (Admiralty) and 23 May 1986 (Pedder/Central). South Island line platforms opened on 28 December 2016, and East Rail platforms opened on 15 May 2022.)	Central and Western
	Admiralty	金鐘		4.4	Tsuen Wan line; South Island line; East Rail line	12 February 1980; 46 years ago	Central and Western
	Wan Chai	灣仔		5.2	—N/a (Note: Wan Chai station is not an interchange station to Exhibition Centre station on the East Rail line in the MTR fare system. The two stations are not physically connected. There is an out-of-system pedestrian transfer through several footbridges.)	31 May 1985; 41 years ago	Wan Chai
	Causeway Bay	銅鑼灣		6.4	—N/a	31 May 1985; 41 years ago	Wan Chai
	Tin Hau	天后		7.3	—N/a	31 May 1985; 41 years ago	Wan Chai
	Fortress Hill	炮台山		7.9	—N/a	31 May 1985; 41 years ago	Eastern
	North Point	北角		8.8	Tseung Kwan O line	31 May 1985; 41 years ago	Eastern
	Quarry Bay	鰂魚涌		9.8	Tseung Kwan O line	31 May 1985; 41 years ago	Eastern
	Tai Koo	太古		10.7	—N/a	31 May 1985; 41 years ago	Eastern
	Sai Wan Ho	西灣河		11.5	—N/a	31 May 1985; 41 years ago	Eastern
	Shau Kei Wan	筲箕灣		12.3	—N/a	31 May 1985; 41 years ago	Eastern
	Heng Fa Chuen	杏花邨		13.6	—N/a	31 May 1985; 41 years ago	Eastern
	Chai Wan	柴灣		15.0	—N/a	31 May 1985; 41 years ago	Eastern

== Future development ==
A proposal suggests extending the Island line eastward to terminate at a new Siu Sai Wan station.

== See also ==
- List of areas of Hong Kong
- North Island line
- Transport in Hong Kong
