= King George V Memorial Park, Kowloon =

Public park in Kwun Chung, Hong Kong

Coordinates: 22.30522°N 114.16807°E

King George V Memorial Park
- 九龍佐治五世紀念公園
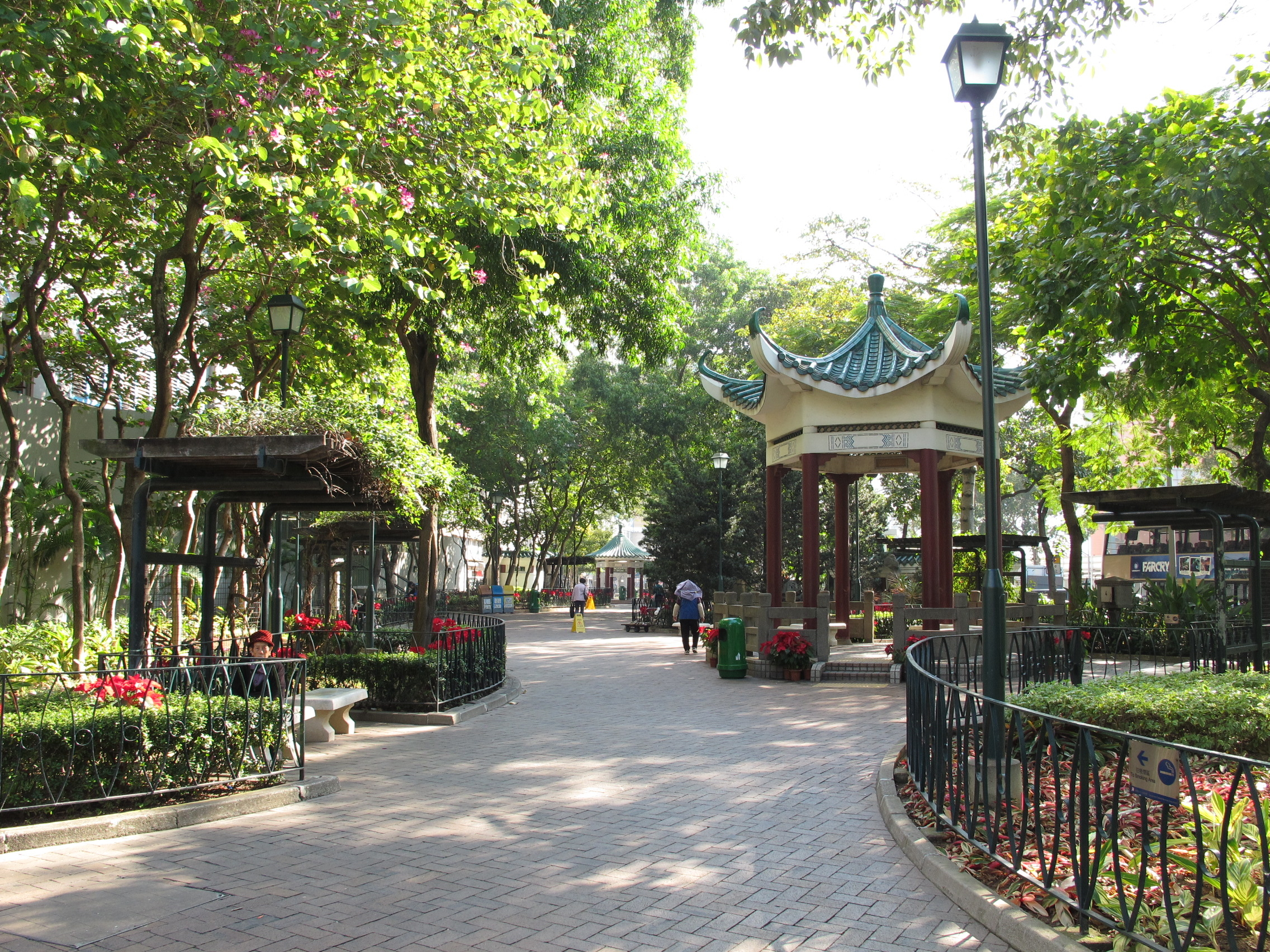
- Interactive map of King George V Memorial Park
- Location: Kwun Chung, Kowloon
- Area: 1.5 hectares (3.7 acres)
- Opened: 11 June 1941; 85 years ago
- Operator: Leisure and Cultural Services Department
- Public transit: Austin Station (70 m); Jordan station (310 m)

King George V Memorial Park, Kowloon
- Traditional Chinese: 九龍佐治五世紀念公園
- Simplified Chinese: 九龙佐治五世纪念公园
Transcriptions
Standard Mandarin
- Hanyu Pinyin: Jiǔlóng Zuǒzhì Wǔshì Jìniàn Gōngyuán
Yue: Cantonese
- Yale Romanization: Gáu lùhng jo jih ńgh sai géi nihm gūng yùhn
- Jyutping: Gau2 lung4 zo3 zi6 ng5 sai3 gei2 nim6 gung1 jyun4

King George V Memorial Park, Kowloon, is a park in Jordan, Kowloon, Hong Kong, located beside Canton Road. There are two parks of this name in Hong Kong. The other one is in Sai Ying Pun, Hong Kong Island.

== History ==
The park was built in 1940. As the governor was ill, administrator Norman Lockhart Smith hosted the park's opening ceremony on 11 June 1941. The park was centred on a statue of King George V. This first iteration of the park was laid out by Palmer and Turner, a Hong Kong architecture firm, while the main contractor was the Lai Kee Company. During the Japanese occupation, some facilities were destroyed and the park was used as a rubbish dump.

Following the war, the Urban Council endeavored to rebuild the derelict park to a new layout. Three Chinese styled kiosks were built. The northern end of the park was designed to cater for the comfort of the elderly. The redesigned park was reopened on 21 March 1954 by the Hon. K. M. A. Barnett, chairman of the Urban Council. The immediate vicinity of the park was once a major centre for commerce and transport in Yau Ma Tei, home to the Jordan Road Ferry Pier, the bustling Kwun Chung Market, and the Canton Road Government Offices (all since demolished, although the market has been reprovisioned in the Kwun Chung Municipal Services Building). As part of the Airport Core Programme the adjacent sea was reclaimed in the early 1990s and the park is no longer next to Victoria Harbour.

In 1957, the Urban Council agreed to a proposal to house small libraries at selected playgrounds, to be managed by the Boys' and Girls' Club Association. On 13 December 1967 a children's playground and library were opened at the park by Urban Councillor Elsie Elliott. In 1980, in light of the 1971 opening of the better-equipped Yau Ma Tei Public Library nearby, the council considered closing the smaller library at King George V Memorial Park. The library was finally demolished with the 1990s redesign of the park (see below).

After the adjacent Canton Road was realigned in the 1970s to meet Ferry Street, King George V Memorial Park was significantly expanded to the west. The extension incorporates an earthen berm to help shield the park from the noise of the roadway.

The Urban Council Kwun Chung Complex (now the Kwun Chung Municipal Services Building) was completed in September 1990 and opened on 1 January 1991 on the site of the former football pitch. A new football pitch and basketball courts were built on the site of the old Kwun Chung Market, and the market was moved into the new Urban Council complex. The complex also houses a cooked food centre and an indoor games hall. It was the first Urban Council Complex in the district and cost $410 million. Other changes made to the park at this time included the demolition and reprovisioning of the public toilet, the demolition of the children's library, construction of a new children's playground, and general improvements and redesign to other areas of the park.

== Facilities ==
- Basketball court
- Children's playground
- Chinese pavilion
- Football pitch (7-a-side)
- Kwun Chung Municipal Services Building
- Public toilet

== Gallery ==
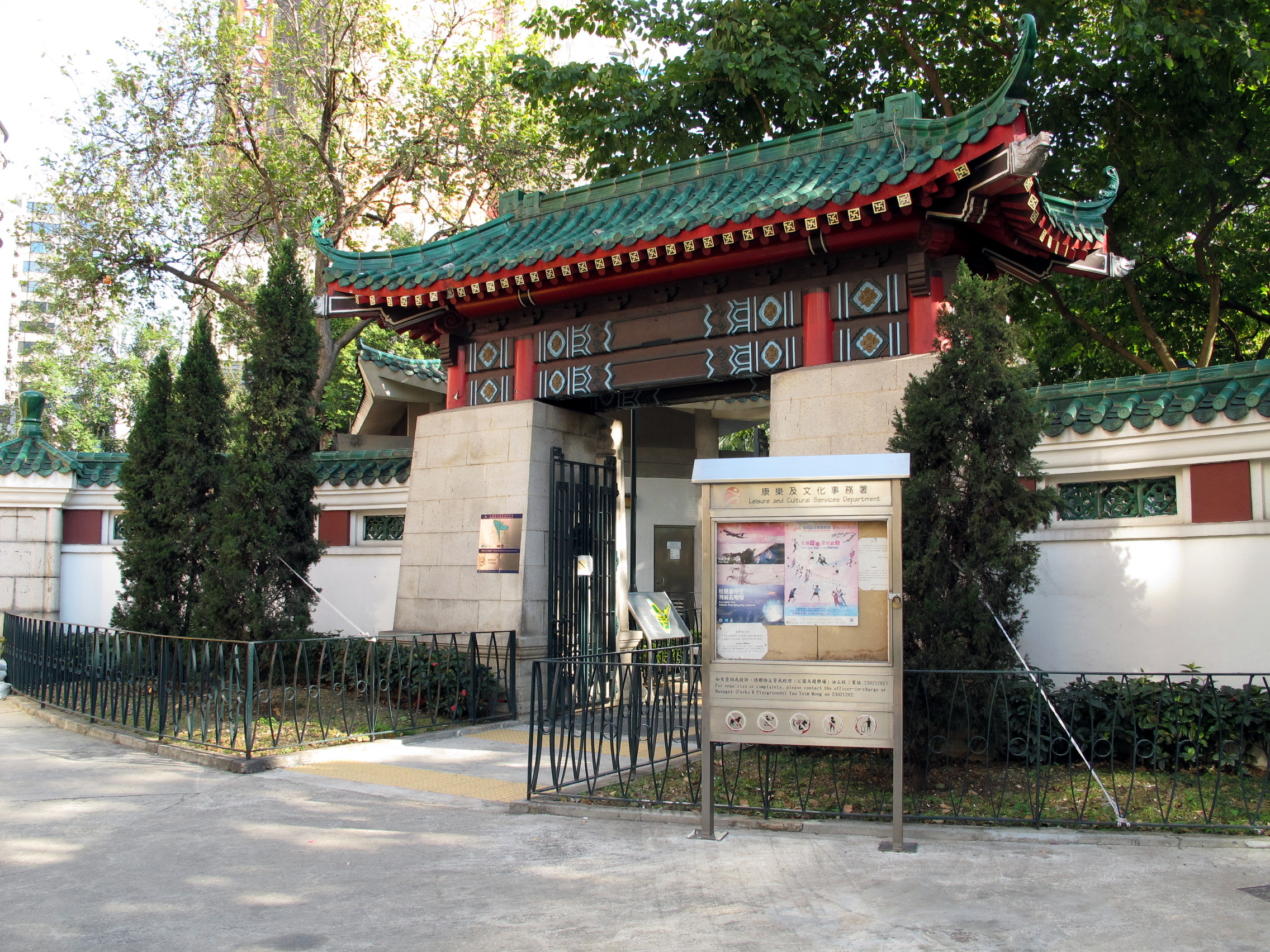
Entrance gate

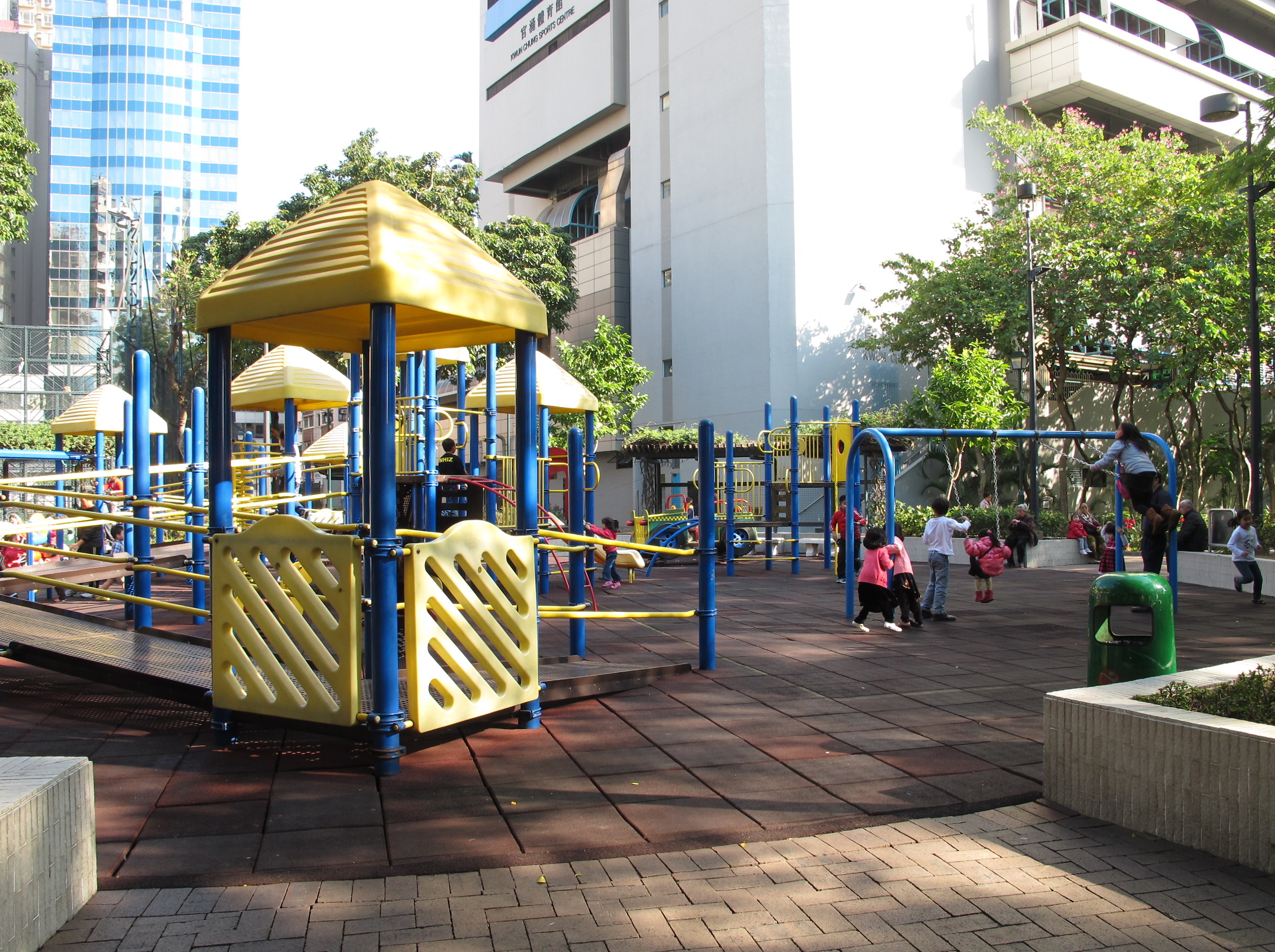
Children's playground and municipal complex

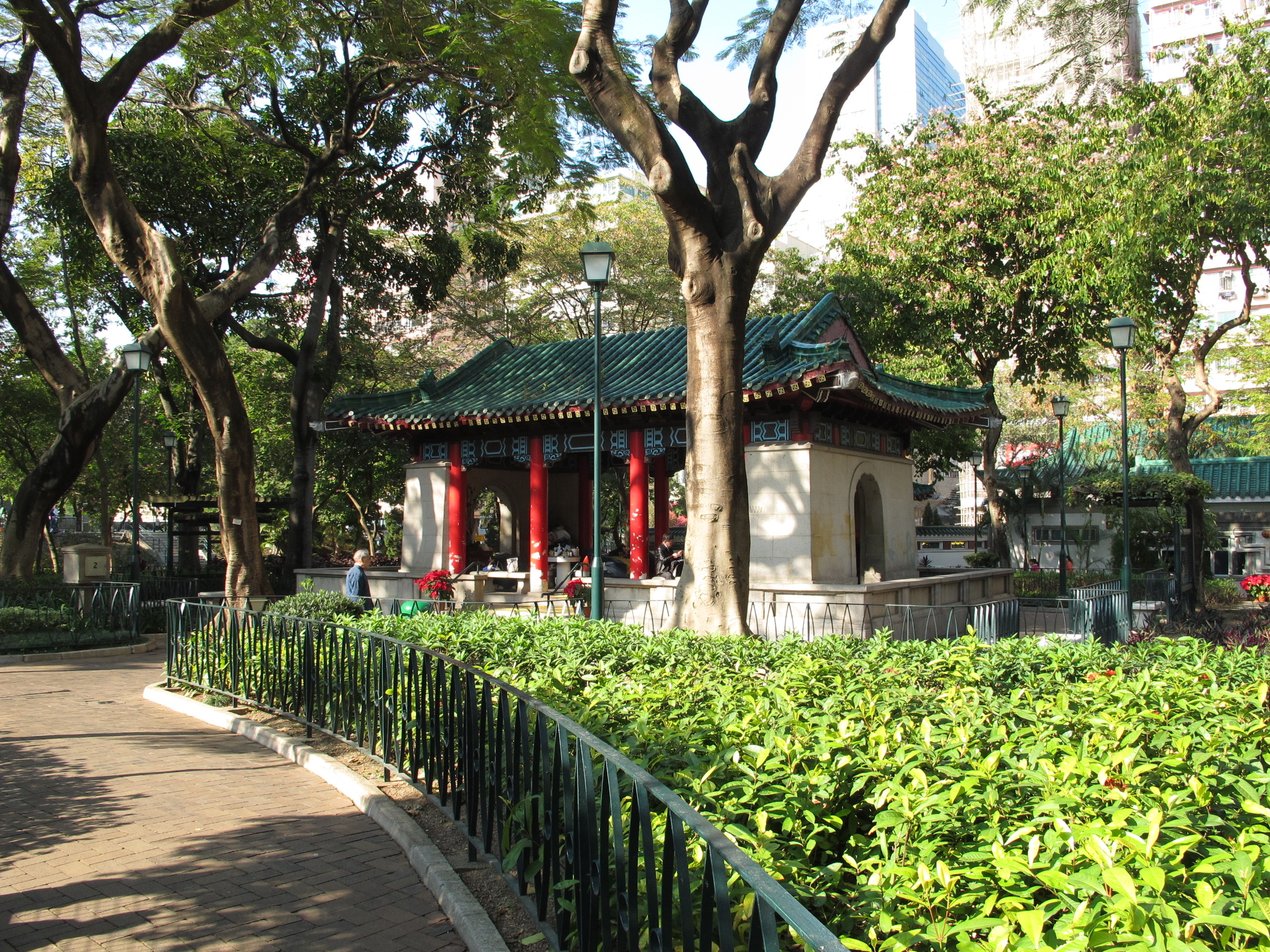
Chinese pavilion

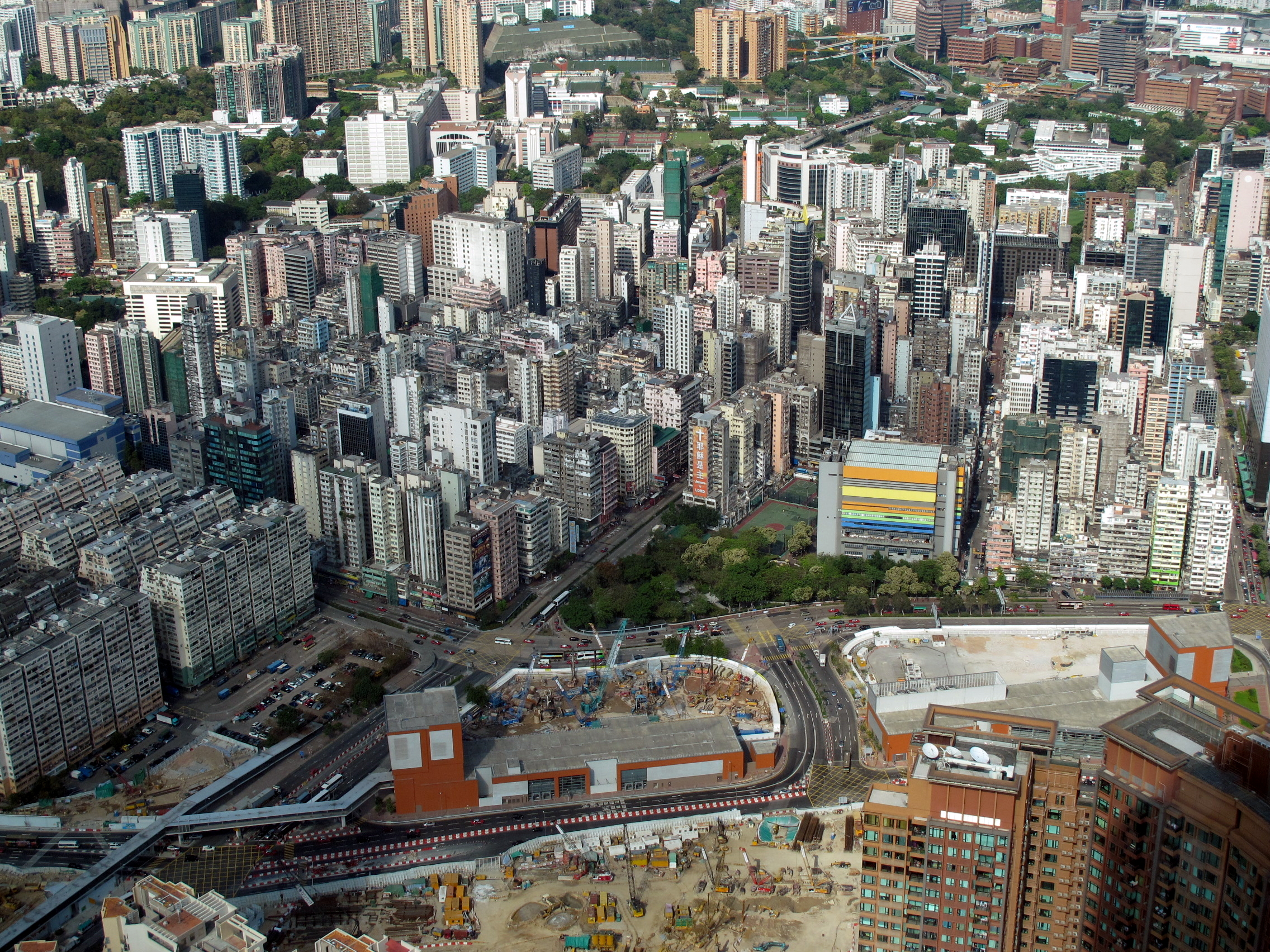
Aerial view

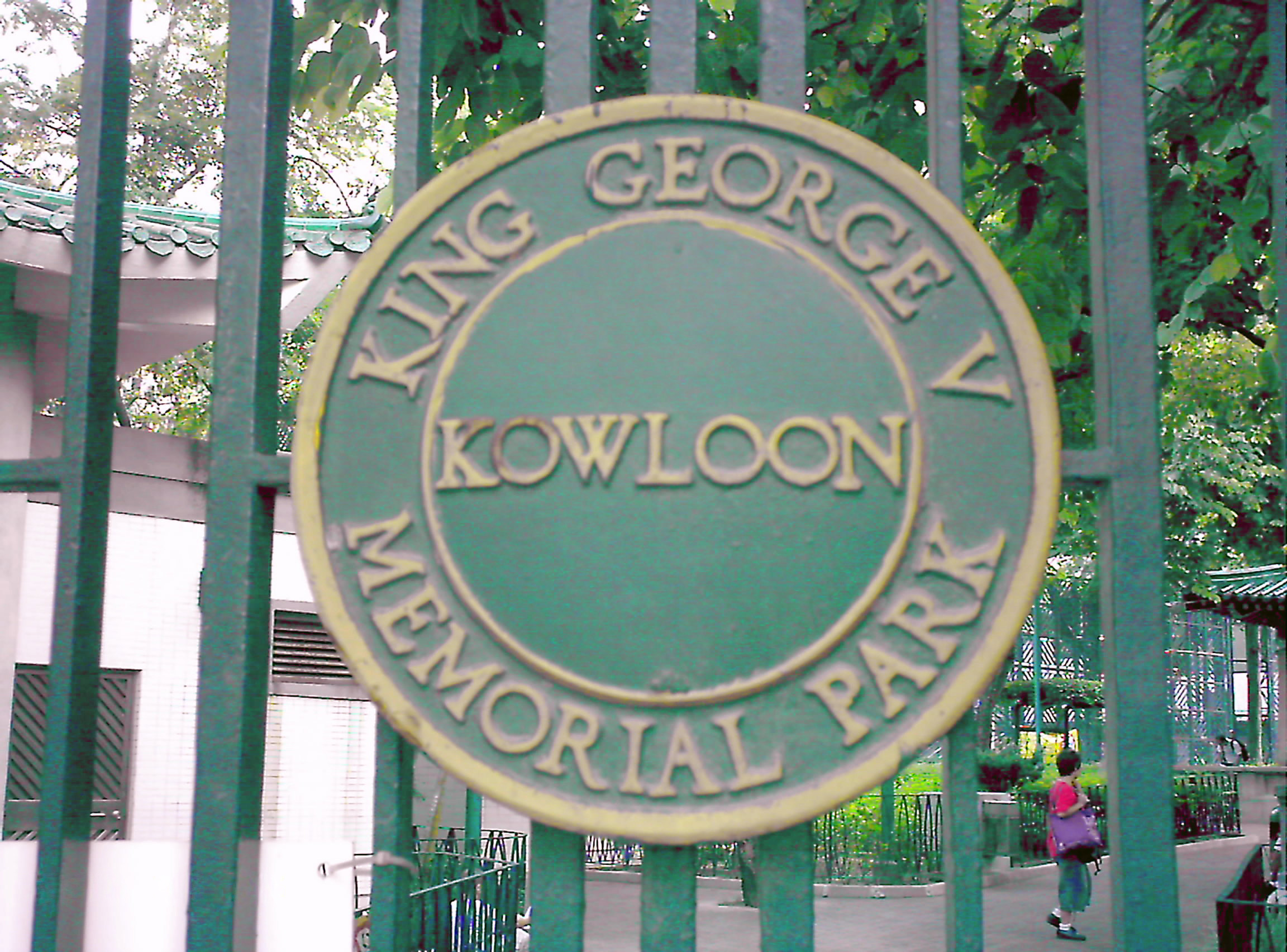
Entrance plaque

== See also ==
- King George V Memorial Park, Hong Kong
