= King George V Memorial Park, Hong Kong =

Public park in Sai Ying Pun, Hong Kong

Coordinates: 22.28591°N 114.14452°E

- 香港佐治五世紀念公園
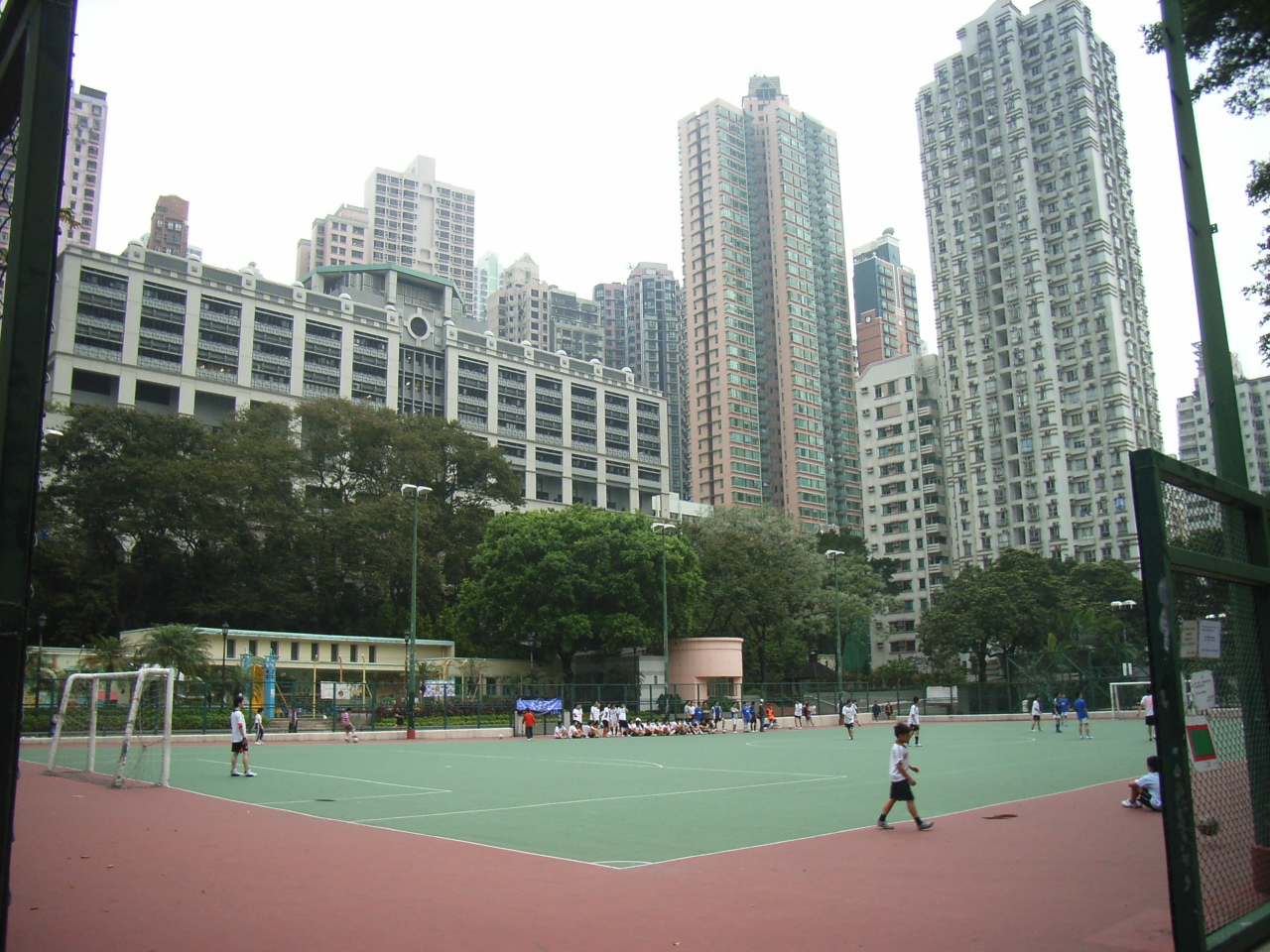
- Football pitch
- Interactive map of King George V Memorial Park, Hong Kong
- Location: Sai Ying Pun, Hong Kong
- Area: 1.25 hectares (3.1 acres) (approx.)
- Opened: 1936; 90 years ago
- Operator: Leisure and Cultural Services Department
- Open: Year round
- Public transit: Sai Ying Pun station (100 m)

King George V Memorial Park, Hong Kong
- Traditional Chinese: 香港佐治五世紀念公園
- Simplified Chinese: 香港佐治五世纪念公园
Transcriptions
Standard Mandarin
- Hanyu Pinyin: Xiānggǎng Zuǒzhì Wǔshì Jìniàn Gōngyuán
Yue: Cantonese
- Yale Romanization: Hēung góng jo jih ńgh sai géi nihm gūng yùhn
- Jyutping: Hoeng1 gong2 zo3 zi6 ng5 sai3 gei2 nim6 gung1 jyun4

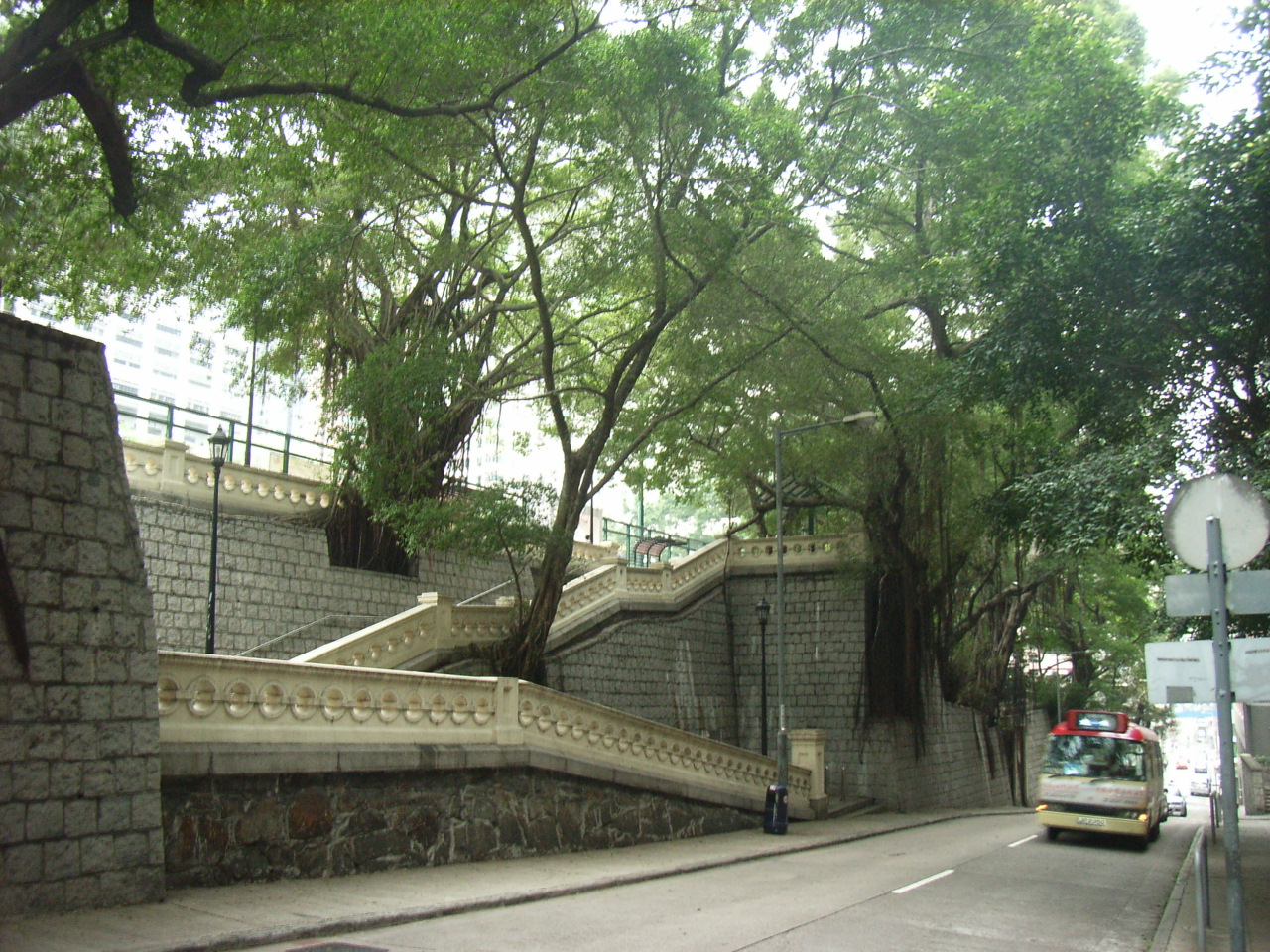
Trees growing on the wall

King George V Memorial Park, Hong Kong, is an urban park in Sai Ying Pun and one of the few parks in Hong Kong bearing the former colonial links to the territory's past.

The park contains a basketball court, a hard surface football ground, sitting out areas, a public toilet, and a child care centre. Access is available from Eastern Street and Hospital Road.

Sai Ying Pun Community Complex is located near the park.

== History ==
There are two King George V Memorial Parks in Hong Kong. One is on the Hong Kong Island while the other is located in Jordan, Kowloon.

In 1936, following the death of King George V, parks were planned for both the city of Victoria on Hong Kong Island, in the garden of and the site of one of the wings of the Civil Hospital, and one on Canton Road in Kowloon, both to be paid for by public subscription.

In June 1941, the Memorial Park in Kowloon, King George V Memorial Park, Kowloon, was opened; it is located beside Canton Road. Administrator Norman Lockhart Smith hosted the ceremony for this park. It had a statue of King George V in the centre of the park. During the Japanese occupation, facilities were destroyed. Three Chinese styled kiosks were built after World War II. In 1941, King George V Memorial Park, originally planned as King George's Field, adjacent the old Civil Hospital in Hong Kong, had yet to be built.

== West Island Line construction ==
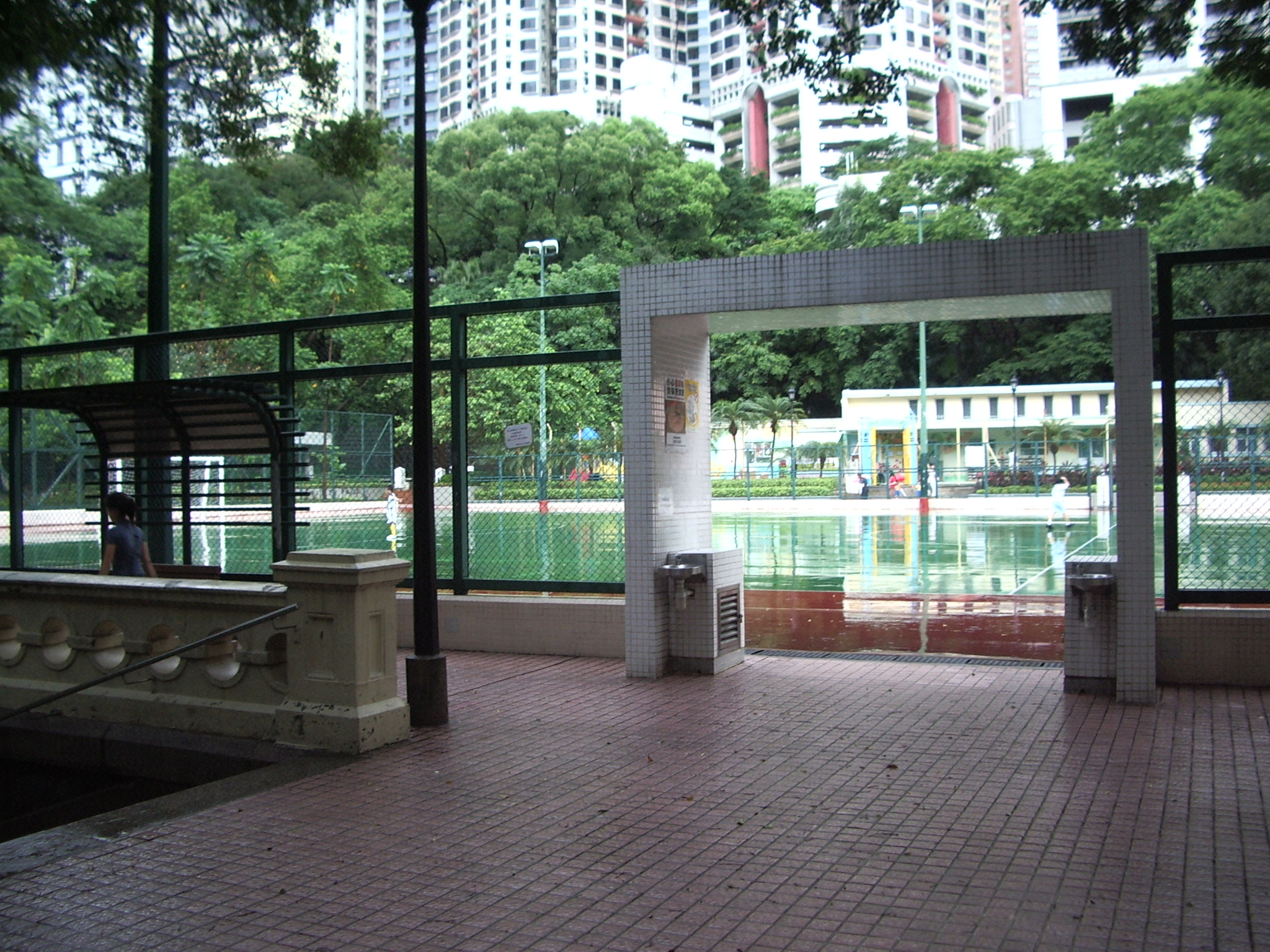
Site of the station: under a football field

In March 2004, the MTR changed the planned location of the Sai Ying Pun station east and south of the initial alignment to an area deep under King George V Memorial Park. A source from MTR Corporation Limited (MTRCL) revealed to the local newspaper Ming Pao that this location was chosen to avoid any nuisance during works under major roads. The location would also better serve Mid-Levels residents, the MTR said. Part of the park was closed temporarily to the public for the duration of construction.

== Gallery ==
The photos of the gallery was taken in the King George V Memorial Park on Hong Kong Island.

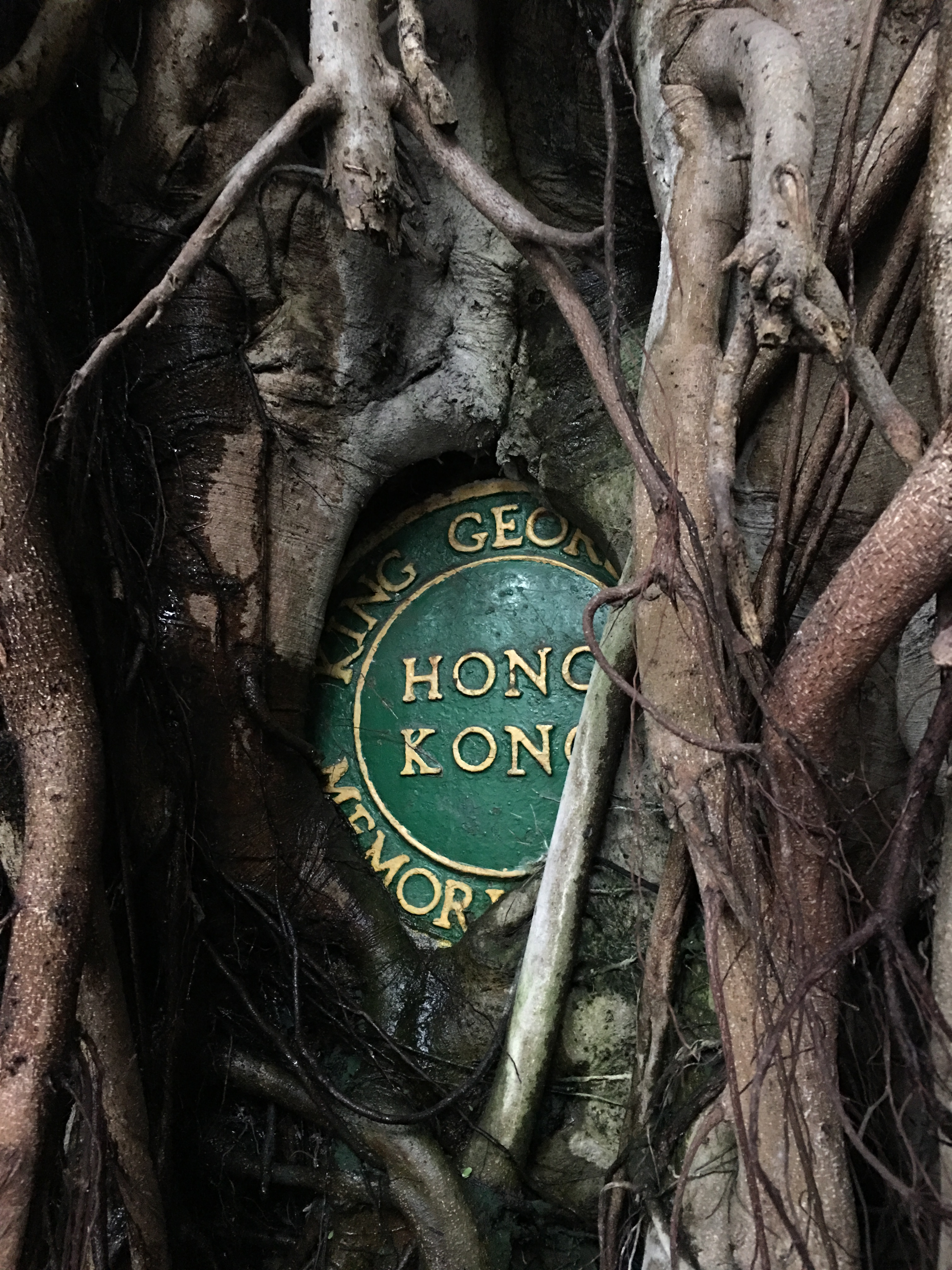
The roots of an old banyan tree covering a wall and a plaque

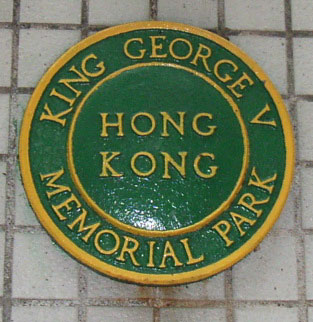
Sign of the park

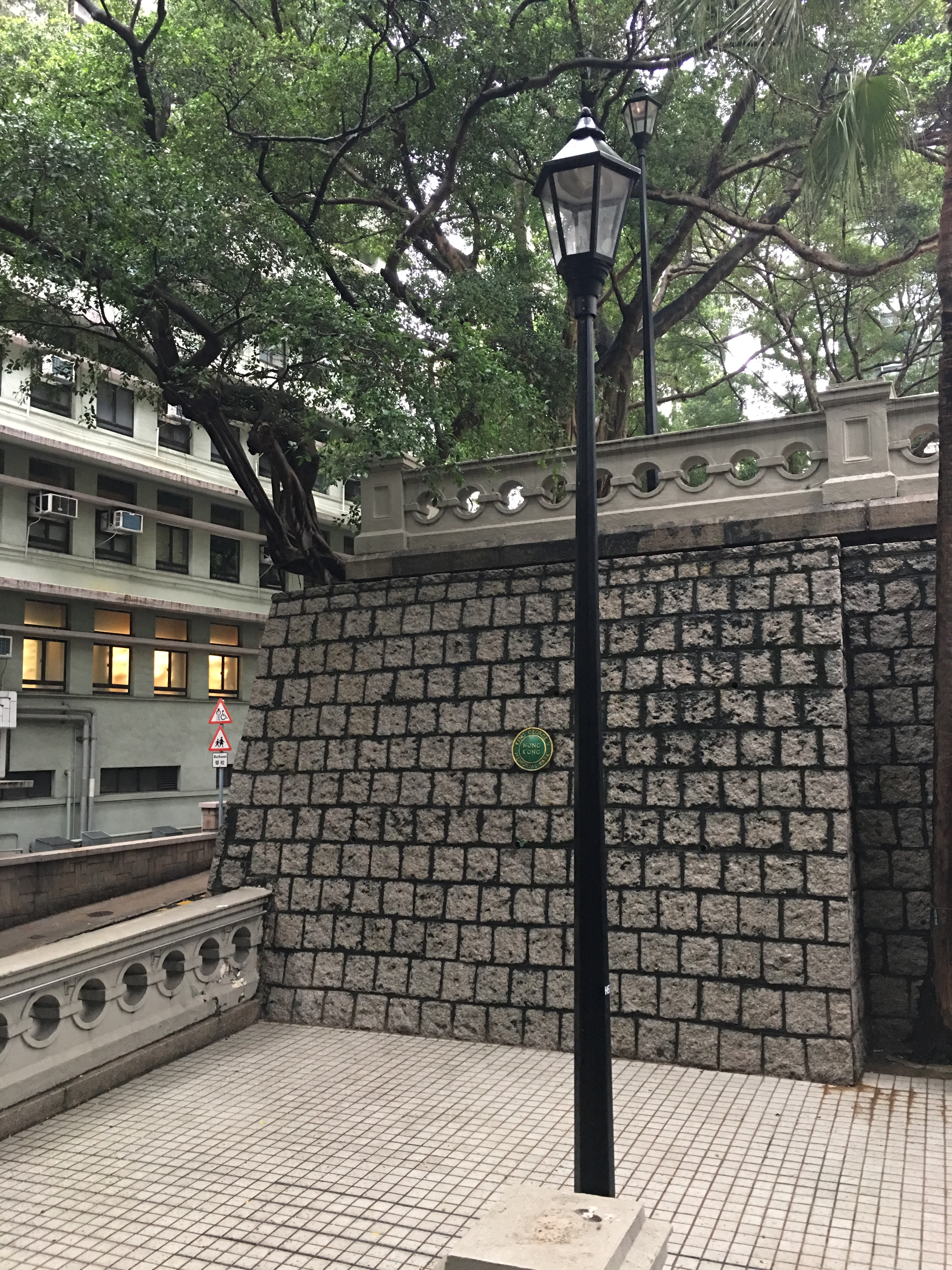
Victorian street light in the park

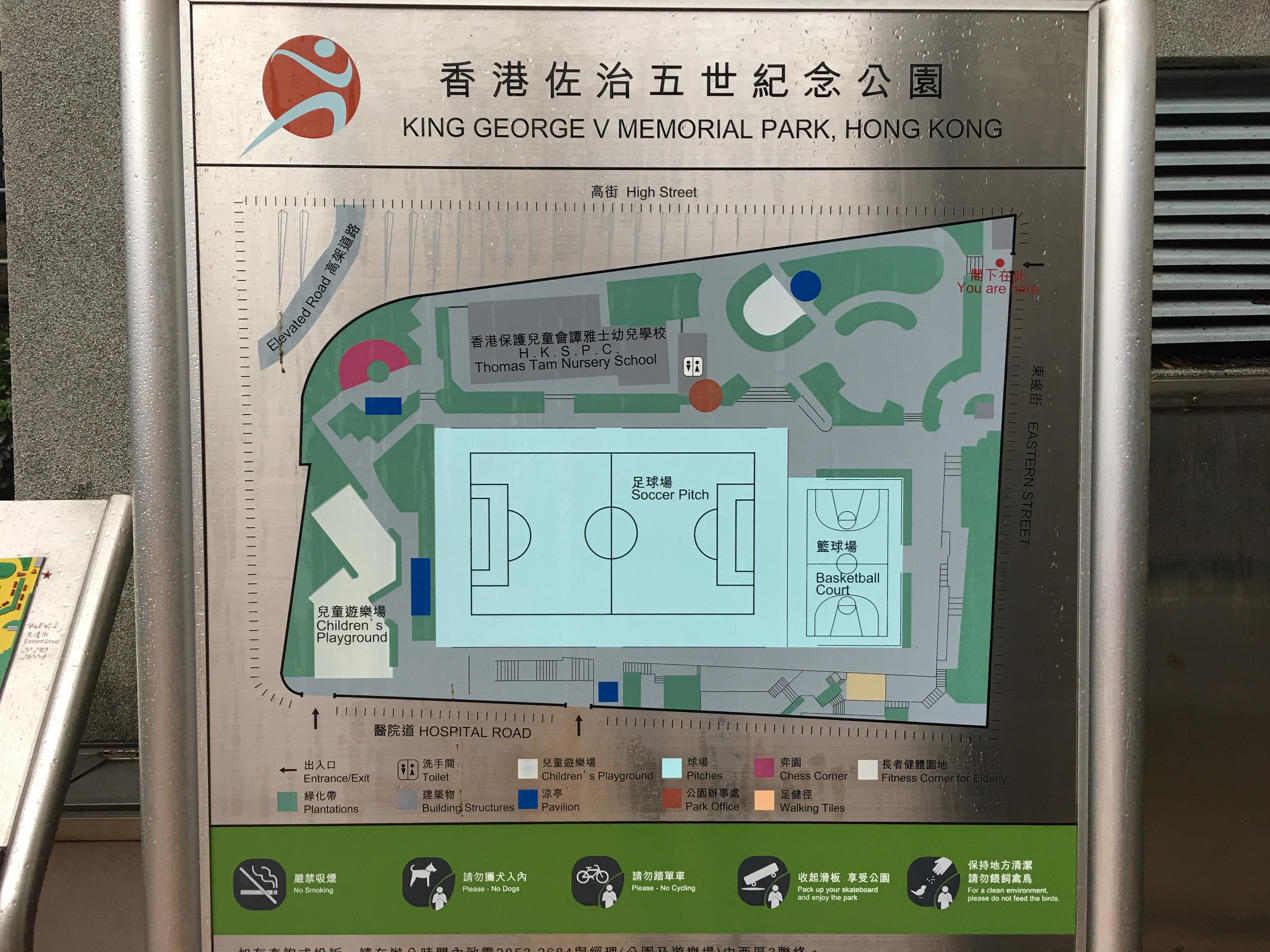
Map of the park

== See also ==
- List of urban public parks and gardens in Hong Kong
- Great George Street, Hong Kong
- King George V School
- Hong Kong Zoological and Botanical Gardens has a statue of George VI
- Victoria Park (Hong Kong) has a statue of Queen Victoria
- King George V Memorial Park, Kowloon
