= Citybus Route 3B =

1920s–2015 bus route in Hong Kong

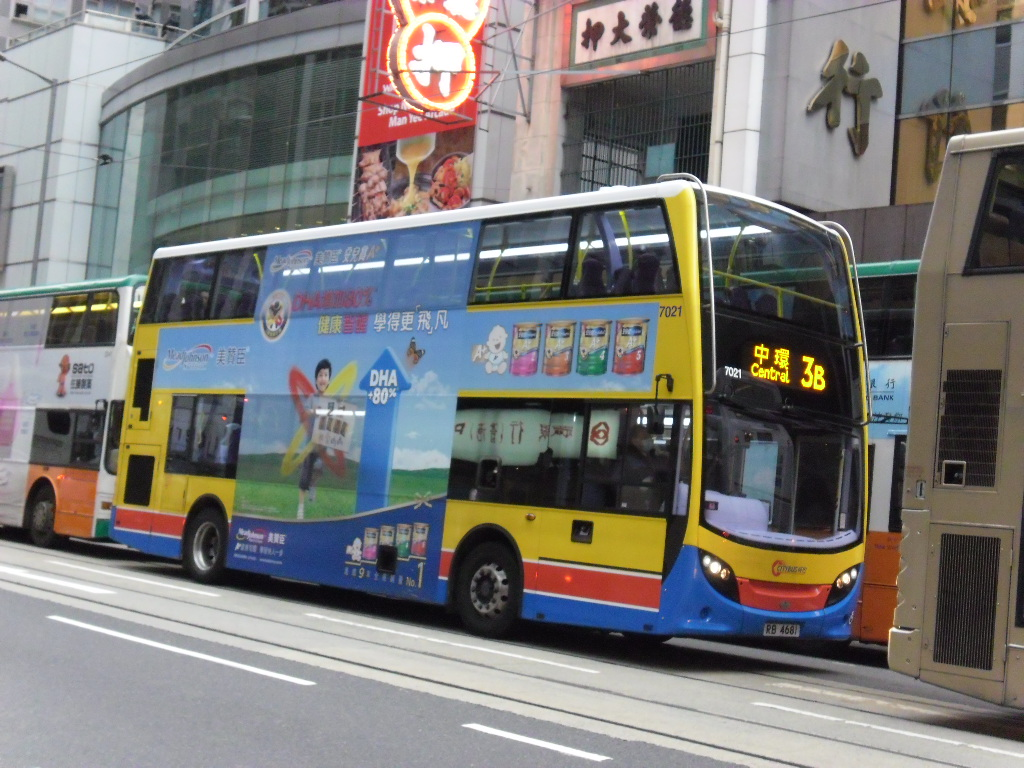
- Citybus Alexander Dennis Enviro400 in March 2012

Overview
- Operator: Citybus
- Vehicle: Volvo Olympian; Dennis Dragon; Alexander Dennis Enviro400

Route
- Start: Pokfield Road
- Via: University of Hong Kong; Mid-Levels
- End: Central (Rumsey Street)
- Length: 5.9 kilometres

Route 3B is a cancelled bus route operated by Citybus, between Pokfield Road Bus Terminus and Central (Rumsey Street) via Mid-Levels. Before 1997, the number of the route was numbered 3.

== History ==
In the 1920s, the route was opened by the Hongkong and Shanghai Hotels, between University of Hong Kong, Central and Royal Pier via Caine Road, with no route number. On 11 June 1933, the route was taken over by China Motor Bus as part of the Hong Kong Island bus franchise, and given the number 3.

In 1934, the Central terminus was changed to the Hongkong and Yaumati Ferry Piers. On 1 April 1935, the route became circular with the Central bound by way of Sai Ying Pun, but the arrangement was cancelled on 14 June 1937. During Japanese occupation of Hong Kong no service on the route was provided.

Services resumed on 16 April 1946 between the University of Hong Kong and Royal Pier. The Central terminus was changed to Central Piers on 13 May the same year, then on 1 January 1960 to Jubilee Street. On 1 October 1963, service was extended to Pokfield Road bus terminus. On 16 April 1974, the route was changed to Robinson Road for the Central bound in conjunction with the inauguration of the first bus lane in Hong Kong. On 1 March 1976, the service was extended to Queen Mary Hospital, but on 1 September 1982, cut back to Pokfield Road. On 20 December 1985, the Central terminus was changed to Hong Kong-Macau Ferry Pier, and to Rumsey Street on 23 May 1986 in conjunction with the opening of Sheung Wan station on Island line of the MTR.

Patronage decreased after Citybus took over routes 12 and 12M and converted them to air-conditioned routes, since route 3 was still a non air-conditioned route with the same prices. On 2 June 1997, China Motor Bus gave up the route due to low patronage. Citybus was interested in taking over the route, and it did so immediately. Since the route was not taken over directly from China Motor Bus, Citybus could not use the number 3, and the number was changed to 3B. The route became an air-conditioned, and patronage level had increased since then.

On 17 May 2015, this route was cancelled due to the opening of the West Island line.

== Last used route ==
=== Towards Rumsey Street ===
- Pok Fu Lam Road (Pokfield Road Bus Terminus, Academic Terrace, Lady Ho Tung Hall, Chiu Sheung School Hong Kong)
- Bonham Road (King's College, Ning Yeung Terrace)
- Park Road (St. Stephen's Girls' College, Euston Court)
- Robinson Road (Ying Wa Girls' School, Peaksville, Seymour Road, Raimondi College, Garden Terrace)
- Garden Road (Hong Kong Zoological and Botanical Gardens, St. John's Cathedral
- Des Voeux Road Central (The Landmark, Central Market)
- Wing Wo Street
- Connaught Road Central
- Man Kat Street

=== Towards Pokfield Road ===
- Man Kat Street
- Connaught Road Central (Jardine House, City Hall)
- Cotton Tree Drive (Hong Kong Park)
- Kennedy Road (Kennedy Heights)
- Upper Albert Road
- Caine Road (Caritas House, Dr Sun Yat-sen Museum, Ladder Street, Caine Road Garden)
- Bonham Road (Euston Court, Kenyon Court, Centre Street, HKU East Gate)
- Pok Fu Lam Road (HKU East Gate, Lady Ho Tung Hall, Pokfield Road Bus Terminus)
