= East Kowloon line (1970 scheme) =

Proposed Hong Kong MTR railway line

East Kowloon line (Chinese: 東九龍綫) was one of the original five MTR lines proposed in the late 1970s in Hong Kong, which would have connected Sheung Wan with East Kowloon.

== Hong Kong Mass Transportation Study (1967) ==
Mass Transportation Study 1967

In September 1967 the Freeman, Fox, Wilbur Smith & Associates of England published a proposal to construct a mass transit system in Hong Kong, in which East Kowloon line was called Sha Tin line, connecting Wo Liu Hang in Fo Tan and Tsim Sha Tsui. The route was to be 16 kilometers.

=== Alignment and stations ===
- Wo Liu Hang (near Fo Tan and Sha Tin Racecourse) would have been a transfer station with today's East Rail line, and also the depot of the line.
- Ha Wo Che
- Sha Tin Central (near Sha Tin Park)
- Shan Ha Wai (near Tsang Tai Uk)
- Hung Mui Kuk
- Tsz Wan Shan would have been 15 metres (49 ft) deep under Sheung Fung Street, with high-speed lifts like those on the West Island line instead of escalators.
- Diamond Hill would have been an interchange with Kwun Tong line, on different levels like in Quarry Bay.
- Kai Tak
- Ma Tau Wai
- To Kwa Wan
- Ho Man Tin
- Hung Hom, the section from which to Tsim Sha Tsui was intended to provide connection between the relocated KCR terminus and Tsim Sha Tsui for transferring to the CBD on Hong Kong Island.
- Tsim Sha Tsui

== Hong Kong Mass Transit Further Studies (1970) ==
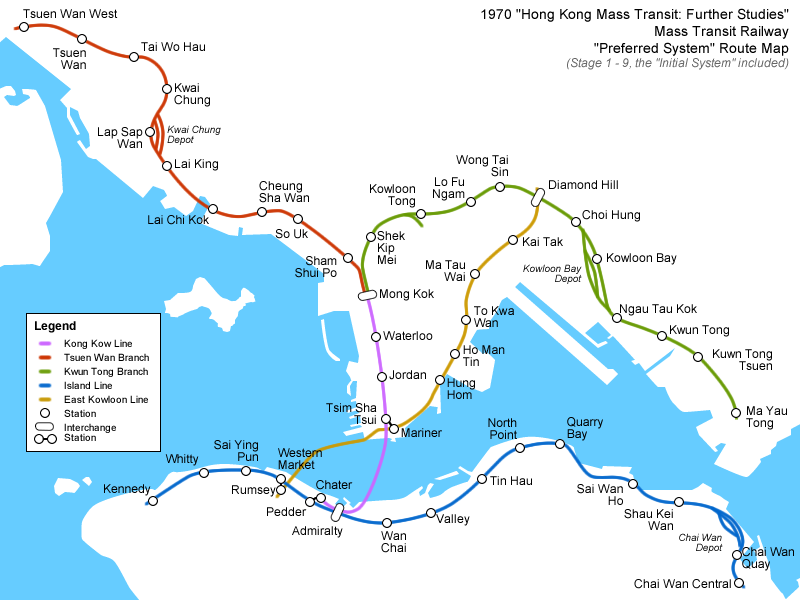
Mass Transportation Study 1970

Freeman, Fox, Wilbur Smith & Associates published a new report on MTR construction in 1970, with the original Sha Tin line cut back from Sha Tin to Diamond Hill to become East Kowloon line (now part of Tuen Ma line), and extended across the harbour from Tsim Sha Tsui to Sheung Wan.

=== Alignment and stations ===
The new report stated that the Sha Tin section need not be built immediately since an error was made in the 1966 census. However, the report pointed out that the cross-harbour traffic demand for the East Kowloon area would be heavy, necessitating an extension to Rumsey. Its length is 11 kilometers.

- Diamond Hill
- Kai Tak
- Ma Tau Wai
- To Kwa Wan
- Ho Man Tin
- Hung Hom
- Mariner (renamed from Tsim Sha Tsui, and has moved southwards, the current East Tsim Sha Tsui station is the approximate location of Mariner station.)
- Rumsey would be located under Rumsey Street. It would be integrated with and perpendicular to the proposed WM station on the Island line. Unlike the current Sheung Wan station, the EKL platforms were one level under Island line platforms in the 1970 proposal. According to Urban Council sources, the current exit E of Sheung Wan station is the approximate location of Rumsey station.

== Modified Initial System (1975) ==
With the withdrawal of the Japanese consortium from the MTR construction contract in 1975, the Government announced that the initial system would be reduced to 15.6 km to become the Modified Initial System. Construction arrangements would be made on the MIS to facilitate EKL construction at a later time, and the EKL would eventually be able to extend to Wo Liu Hang as originally planned. EKL was planned to cover approximately 10 kilometers.

Although the 1970 proposal stated that Sha Tin District did not need a metro during the meantime, the 1975 proposal pointed out that the demand of the EKL would be too low to support construction of the line, if the Sha Tin section was not built together.

=== Architectural reservations ===
With the uncertainty on the Sha Tin extension, and with no available land to construct a depot along the remainder of the alignment, arrangements were made to let EKL use the Kowloon Bay depot of Kwun Tong line.

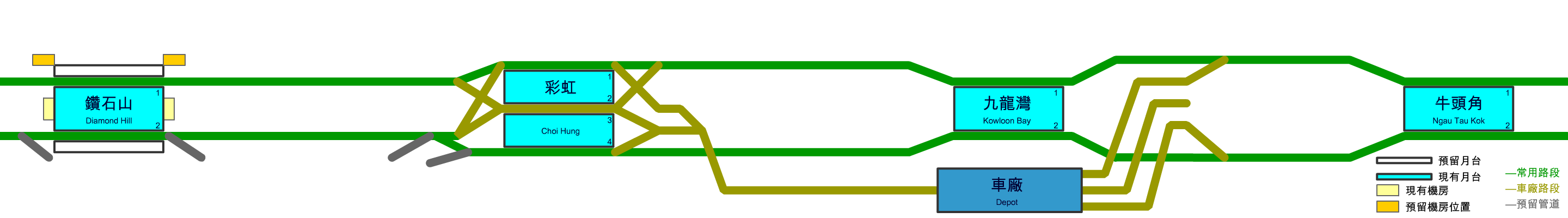
Track diagram, Diamond Hill to Ngau Tau Kok. Green: Kwun Tong line; Grey: reserved for East Kowloon line; Khaki: access tracks to Kowloon Bay Depot

==== Choi Hung station ====
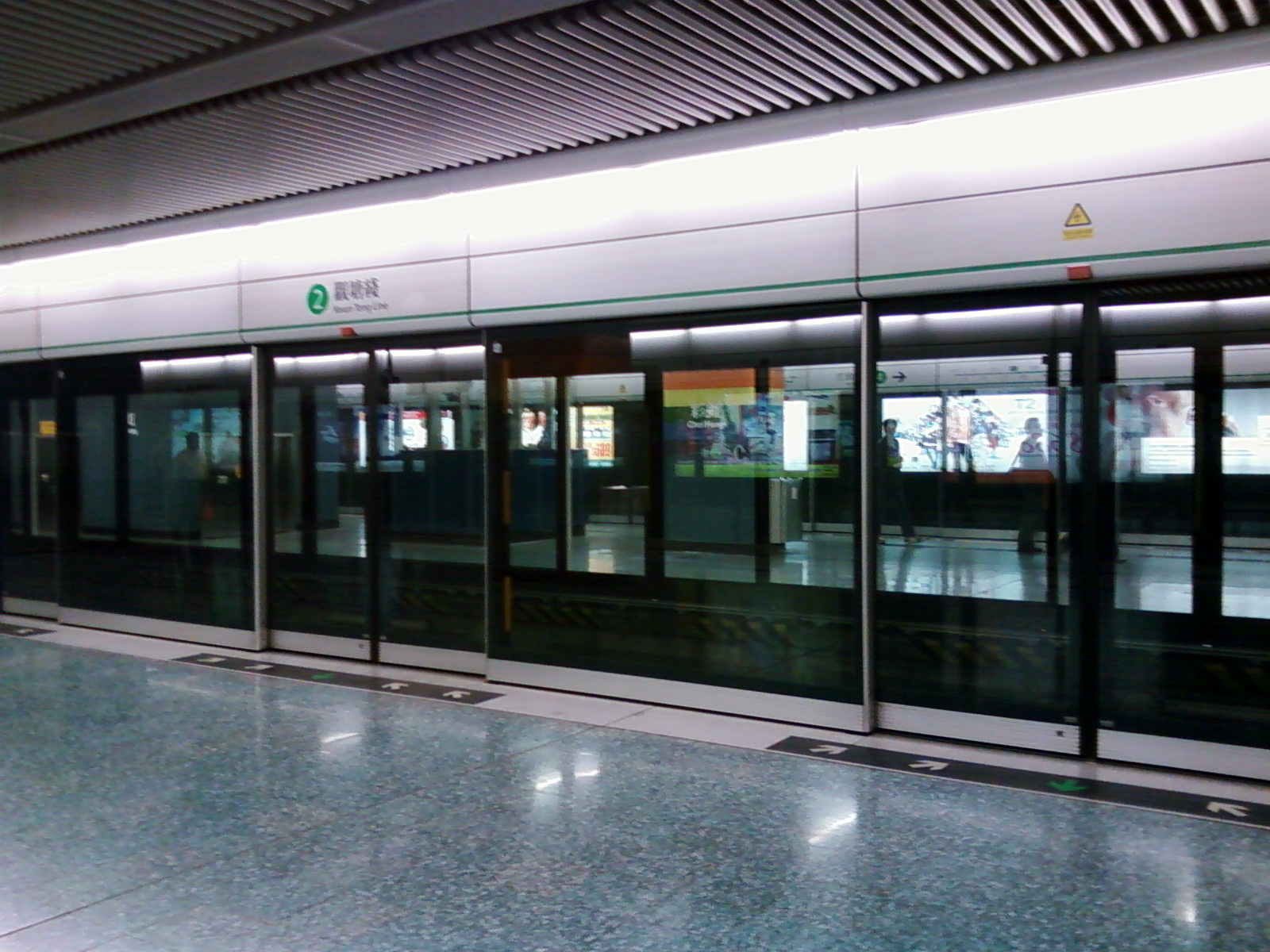
Central track at Choi Hung

In order to prevent EKL trains from interfering with Kwun Tong line operation when accessing the depot, a direct track was built for the required connection, which passes through Choi Hung station.

==== Diamond Hill station ====
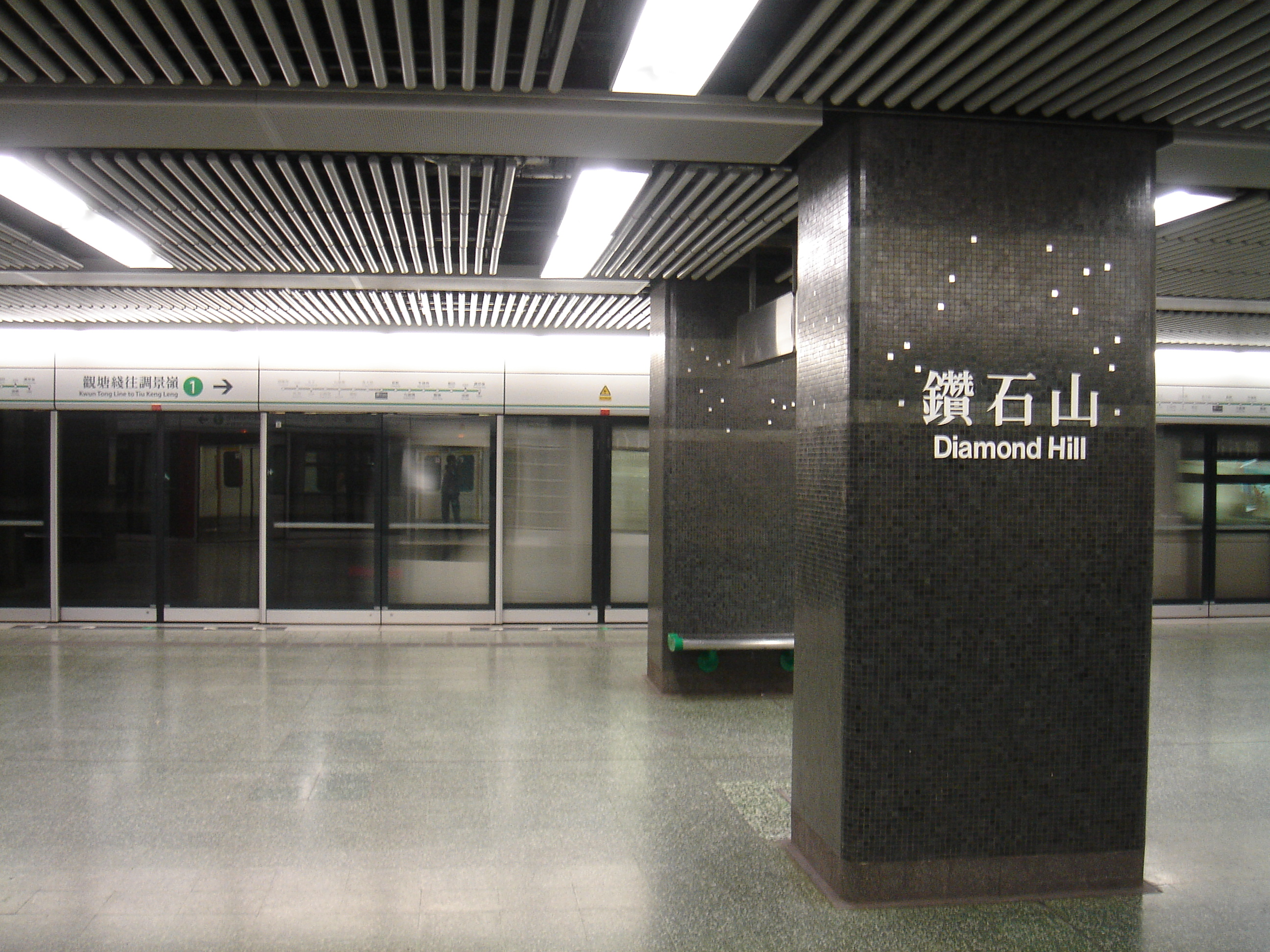
Central platform at Diamond Hill

According to the MIS plan, Diamond Hill station would eventually have five tracks and eight platforms. During construction of the station, spaces were reserved for later construction, making the size of Diamond Hill greater than other stations.

== Comprehensive Transport Study (1976) ==
In 1976 the Government invited a consultation company to carry out a study on transportation in Hong Kong. The resulting report proposed the Sha Tin Loop, East Kowloon line and the Tsim Sha Tsui extension, built in stages to replace the original EKL proposal. The Loop and the TST extension did not have much difference from the 1967 proposal, although the new arrangement was to let KCRC operate the two lines first, to be transferred to MTRC after completion of the East Kowloon line.

=== Sha Tin Loop ===
The Sha Tin Loop was to be constructed as a branch of the Kowloon–Canton Railway by KCRC, in the form of a rapid transit line, providing rail access from eastern Sha Tin to the urban areas. The route was to connect East Kowloon line after the latter's completion.

==== Alignment ====
- Sha Tin Racecourse at Fo Tan
- Wo Che near the estate of the same name
- Yuen Chau Kok
- Sha Tin Wai
- Che Kung Temple above Tin Sam Village
- Hung Mui Kuk near Sun Chui Estate

A new tunnel would be constructed to connect the Tsim Sha Tsui extension.

== 1980s ==
=== Eastern Harbour Tunnel ===
In 1984 the Government decided to construct Eastern Harbour Crossing, carrying both road and rail, to alleviate congestion at Cross-Harbour Tunnel. Kwun Tong line was extended from Kwun Tong to Quarry Bay upon the tunnel's completion. The plan to construct East Kowloon line was stalled with the completion of the new cross-harbour connection.

=== Sheung Wan station ===
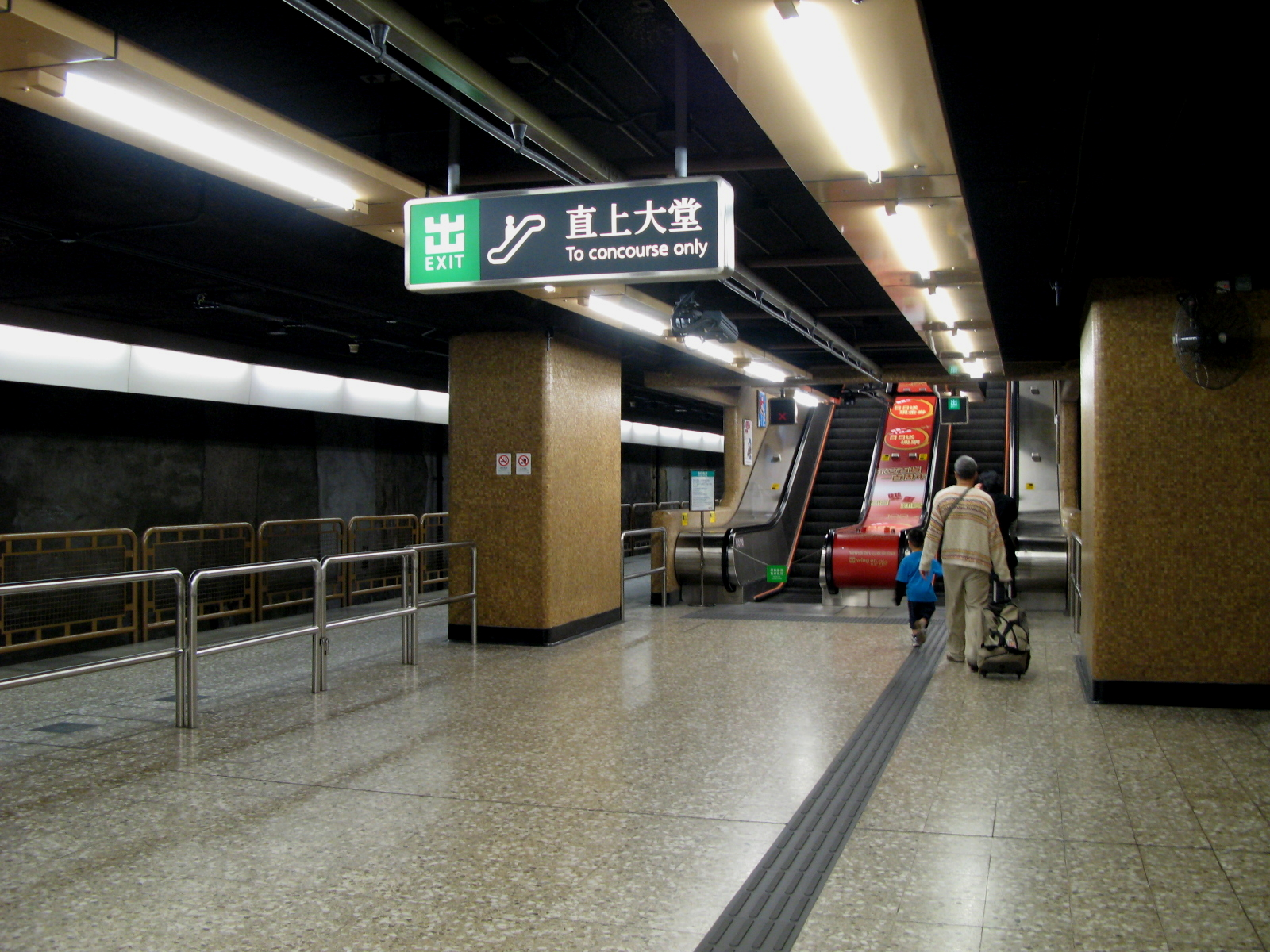
Rumsey station

During the construction of Sheung Wan station, platforms for East Kowloon line were built together to prevent interference that later construction of the EKL might arise. In May 1986, the station was opened with the reserved EKL platforms above Island line platforms. The ends of the platforms were shut off by brick walls, leaving only 60 metres for the platforms. Posters for the East Kowloon line were spotted when the station first opened.

== Other reservations made ==
=== East Kowloon Corridor ===
During the construction of the East Kowloon Corridor in the 1970s, sheet pile walls were constructed along the alignment and stations on the proposed East Kowloon line, so that no structural damage would be done to the viaduct during the construction of the MTR line.

== Second Integrated Transport Study ==
In 1989 the Government issued the Airport Core Programme plan, and further postponed the construction of the East Kowloon line for the reason of "insufficient distribution of resources". The Central and Wan Chai Reclamation plan was rearranged to facilitate construction of a fourth cross-harbour railway. KCRC started to propose the plan of extending the KCR network southwards by getting involved in the new railway plan. The cross-harbour section of the East Kowloon line was substituted by the construction of the third cross-harbour railway on Tung Chung line, part of the proposed Airport Railway.

=== Third harbour rail crossing ===
In 1989, KCRC handed in a new proposal to the Government, in which today's East Rail line, then KCR British Section, would be extended southwards to Central via Victoria Park and Central and Wan Chai Reclamation.

The Government also mentioned the possibility of extending KCR southwards and Kwun Tong line to Fortress Hill on the Island line. Since the reclamation project involved was under discussion, the Government encouraged a new harbour rail crossing to the area of Tin Hau and Fortress Hill, with another new railway passing through the reclamation area. Consequently, the KCR proposal was ignored.

With the immediate necessity of a third cross-harbour rail link, and also the question about the necessity of a cross-harbour rail link for the Airport Railway, the Government assigned the new harbour connection to the Airport Railway.

The new crossing itself did not solve Tsuen Wan line's fundamental problem - the line was used by both passengers from Kowloon and New Territories East.

=== Fourth harbour rail crossing ===
With the assignment of the third harbour rail link to the Airport Railway, which alleviated the congestion on the Nathan Road section of Tsuen Wan line, the Kwun Tong line extension plan was held back for further planning and consideration. The reconsidered fourth harbour rail crossing started from Hung Hom to Central via the reclamation area, similar to the 1989 proposal by KCRC.

== Eastern Corridor ==
In the new railway development study in 1993, East Kowloon line was modified to become a medium-capacity system, and the alignment was cut back to Kowloon station on the Lantau Airport Railway, forming an Eastern Corridor together with Tsim Sha Tsui Extension and Ma On Shan Rail. A reserved space for the East Kowloon line remains under Kowloon station.

In 1994 the Government published the Railway Development Strategy. The TST extension, Ma On Shan Rail and Tseung Kwan O line would be constructed first. Other sections, such as the Eastern Corridor and the fourth cross harbour rail link would be reconsidered. In 1998, the Government published the third Integrated Transport Study and the second Railway Development Study, breaking the Eastern Corridor into sections and proposing numerous plans to link them up, forming today's West Rail line, Kowloon Southern Link, Tsim Sha Tsui Extension, Sha Tin to Central Link (including the fourth harbour rail crossing, East Kowloon line, and the railway from Tai Wai to Diamond Hill) and Ma On Shan line. In the same year, KCRC won the tender to construct and operate West Rail, TST Extension and Ma On Shan Rail. The East Kowloon line became the East Kowloon section of the Sha Tin to Central Link.

== Railway Development Strategy 2014 ==
The name "East Kowloon line" was resurrected in the Railway Development Strategy 2014, published on 17 September 2014, as the name of a new line which bears no relation to previous proposals of this name. It comprises a new line serving the mid-levels of Kwun Tong District, originating around Diamond Hill station and stretching to Po Lam station, with proposed intermediate stops at Choi Wan, Shun Tin, Sau Mau Ping, and Po Tat. Part of the rationale for this project comes from the large-scale development underway at the former Anderson Road quarry. The new rail line is projected to cost around $27.5 billion.

== Notes ==
=== Bibliography ===
- "Hong Kong passenger transport survey" (PTSU): Dalby, E. & Great Britain. Road Research Laboratory. (1967)
- "Hong Kong mass transport study" (MTS-1967): Freeman, Fox, Wilbur Smith & Associates. & Hong Kong Government (1967)
- "Hong Kong mass transit further studies" (MTS): Freeman, Fox, Wilbur Smith & Associates. & Hong Kong Government (1970)
- "Development of the initial system of the Hong Kong Mass Transit Railway from the further studies proposals": Coulson, C. R.(1975)
- "Hong Kong comprehensive transport study" (CTS-1): Wilbur Smith and Associates.(1976)
- "Hong Kong's new towns : a selective review": Roger Bristow. (1989)
- "Hong Kong second comprehensive transport study" (CTS-2): Wilbur Smith and Associates. & Hong Kong Transport Dept.(1989)
- "Moving into the 21st century : the green paper on transport policy in Hong Kong": Hong Kong. Government Secretariat. Transport Branch. (1989)
- "Moving into the 21st century : the white paper on transport policy in Hong Kong": Hong Kong. Government Secretariat. Transport Branch. (1990)
- "Railway development study"(RDS-1): Hong Kong Transport Bureau (1993)
- "Railway Development Strategy"(RDS-94): Hong Kong Transport Bureau (1994)
- "Kowloon transport super city": Steven Smith (1998)
- "The Second railway development study" (RDS-2): Hong Kong Transport Bureau (1999)
- "Third comprehensive transport study" (CTS-3): Wilbur Smith and Associates. & Hong Kong Transport Bureau (1999)
- "Railway Development Strategy 2000" (RDS-2000): Hong Kong Transport Bureau (2000)
