= Sheung Wan station =

MTR station on Hong Kong Island

Sheung Wan 上環
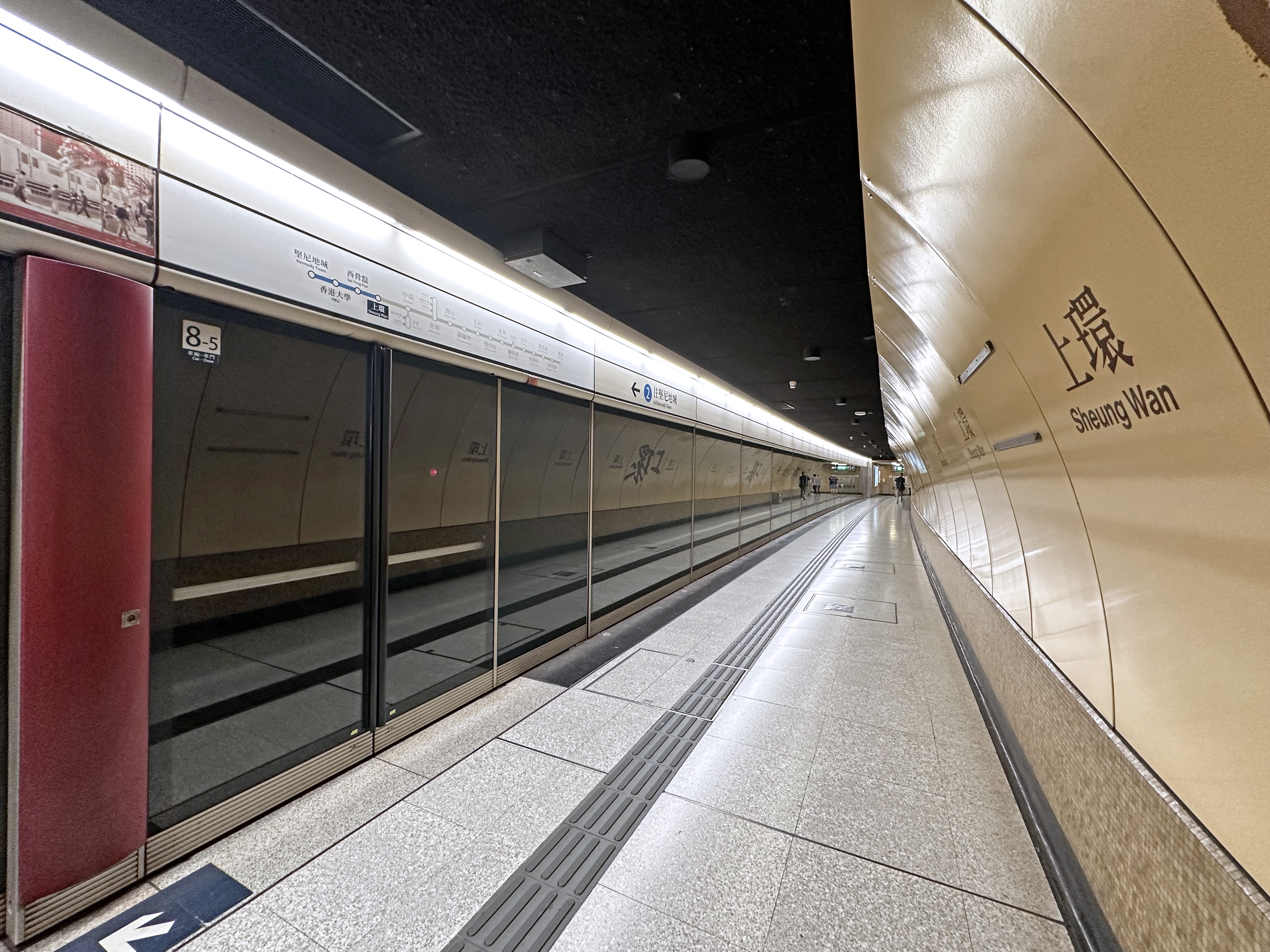
- Platform 2 of Sheung Wan station

Chinese name
- Traditional Chinese: 上環
- Simplified Chinese: 上环
- Literal meaning: Upper ring
Transcriptions
Standard Mandarin
- Hanyu Pinyin: Shànghuán
Yue: Cantonese
- Yale Romanization: seung6 waan4
- Jyutping: soeng6 waan4

General information
- Location: Des Voeux Road Central, Sheung Wan; Central and Western District, Hong Kong
- Coordinates: 22°17′10″N 114°09′06″E
- System: MTR rapid transit station
- Owner: MTR Corporation
- Operator: MTR Corporation
- Line: Island line
- Platforms: 2 side platforms
- Tracks: 2
- Connections: Bus, minibus; Tram; Hong Kong–Macau Ferry Terminal

Construction
- Structure type: Underground
- Accessible: Yes

Other information
- Station code: SHW

History
- Opened: 23 May 1986; 40 years ago
- Former names: Western Market

Services
Preceding station	MTR	Following station
Sai Ying Pun towards Kennedy Town	Island line	Central towards Chai Wan
Track layout
Location
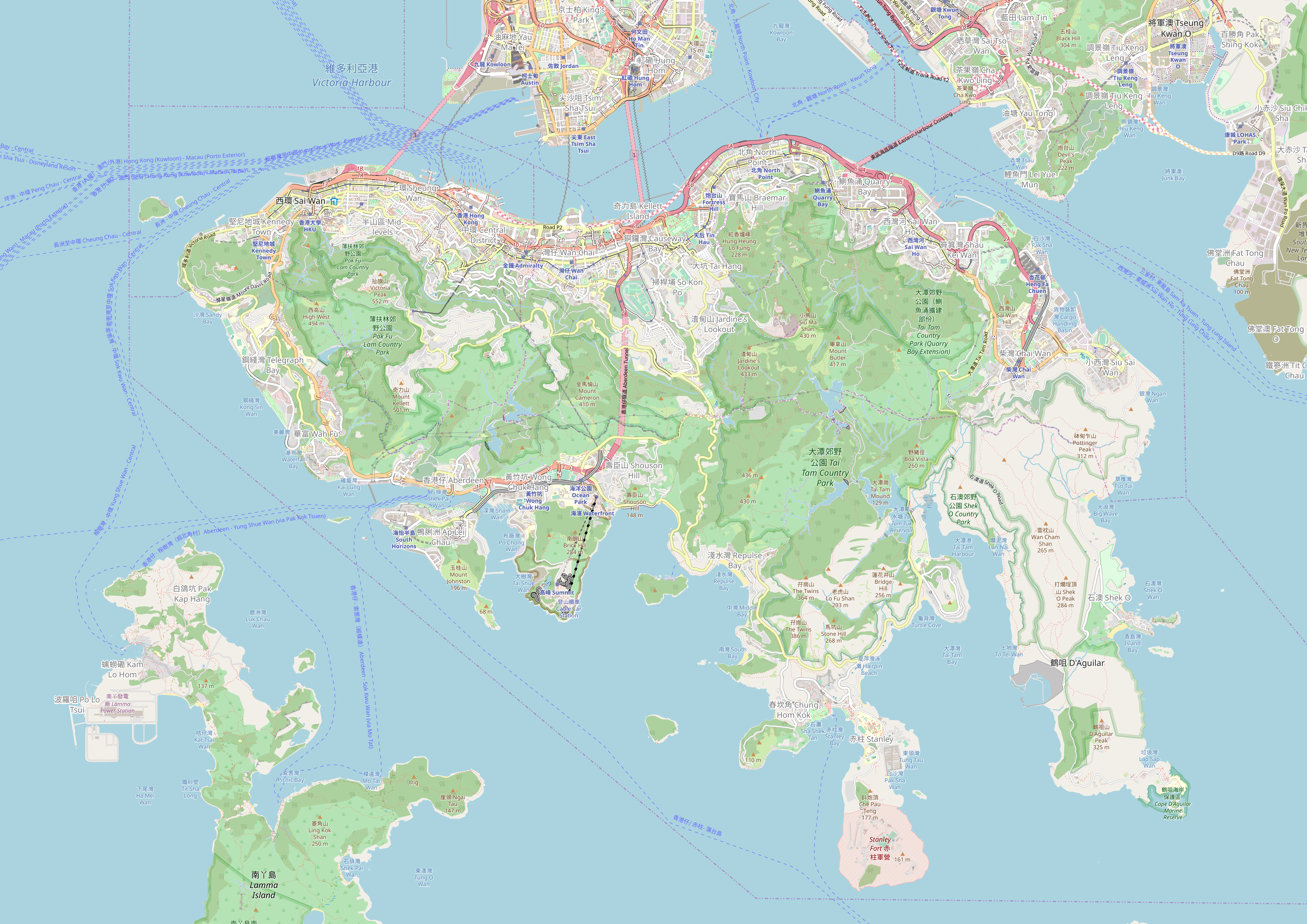
- Location within MTR Location within Hong Kong urban core Location within Hong Kong Island

Sheung Wan is a station on the Island line of the Hong Kong MTR network. The station serves the neighbourhood of Sheung Wan and the western part of Central District. The livery colour of this station is light brown.

The station was originally planned in 1970 as WM but its construction was discontinued after further planning for the new lines. Upon the construction of the Island line, the station was finally constructed and opened on 23 May 1986. From its opening until the line's extension to Kennedy Town in 2014, Sheung Wan was the westbound terminus of the Island line.

== History ==
The station was originally proposed under the name Western Market in the 1967 Hong Kong Mass Transport Study, and was to be the southbound terminus of Kwun Tong line as well as its interchange with the Island line. Due to economic and contractual difficulties, the Hong Kong Government decided not to proceed with the construction of the full system, and the Island line was put on hold.

The Hong Kong Government authorised the construction of the 13.1 km (8.1 mi)-long Island line between Sheung Wan and Chai Wan in December 1980. Work on the station commenced in June 1982 and the construction contract was awarded to a Nishimatsu–Aoki joint venture.

The station was originally planned to open along with the rest of the line, but completion of the station was delayed by the reprovisioning of government offices in the Fire Brigade Building (where Hang Seng Bank Head Office now stands) and the fruit wholesale market on New Market Street, which had to be demolished for the setting up of vertical shaft and crossover box, respectively.

When Island line started operation on 31 May 1985, trains had to terminate at Admiralty and the section between Admiralty and Sheung Wan was not operational. It was not until 23 May 1986 that Sheung Wan station was opened as the western terminus of the Island line. There is a plaque in the station concourse, unveiled by Financial Secretary John Henry Bremridge, commemorating the completion of the Island line.

Sheung Wan served as the western terminus of the Island line until the extension of the line to Kennedy Town in 2014.

== Station layout ==
G	Street level	Exits
L2	Des Voeux Road Central Concourse	Customer Service, MTR shops
L2	Des Voeux Road Central Concourse	Hang Seng Bank, vending machines, ATM
L2	Rumsey Street Concourse	Customer Service, MTR shops
L2	Rumsey Street Concourse	Hang Seng Bank, ATM
L3	Des Voeux Road Central Concourse	Walkway to all platforms
L3	Rumsey Street Concourse	Alternate platforms
L5; Platforms	Side platform, doors will open on the left
L5; Platforms	Platform 1	Island line towards Chai Wan (Central) →
L5; Platforms	Wall
L5; Platforms	Platform 2	← Island line towards Kennedy Town (Sai Ying Pun)
L5; Platforms	Side platform, doors will open on the left

The platforms are built under Des Voeux Road Central from Cleverly Street to Rumsey Street. Although platforms 1 and 2 are parallel and directly opposite to each other, there is a wall separating the two tracks giving a false impression that both platforms are separated by a long distance from each other.

=== Rumsey Street platforms ===
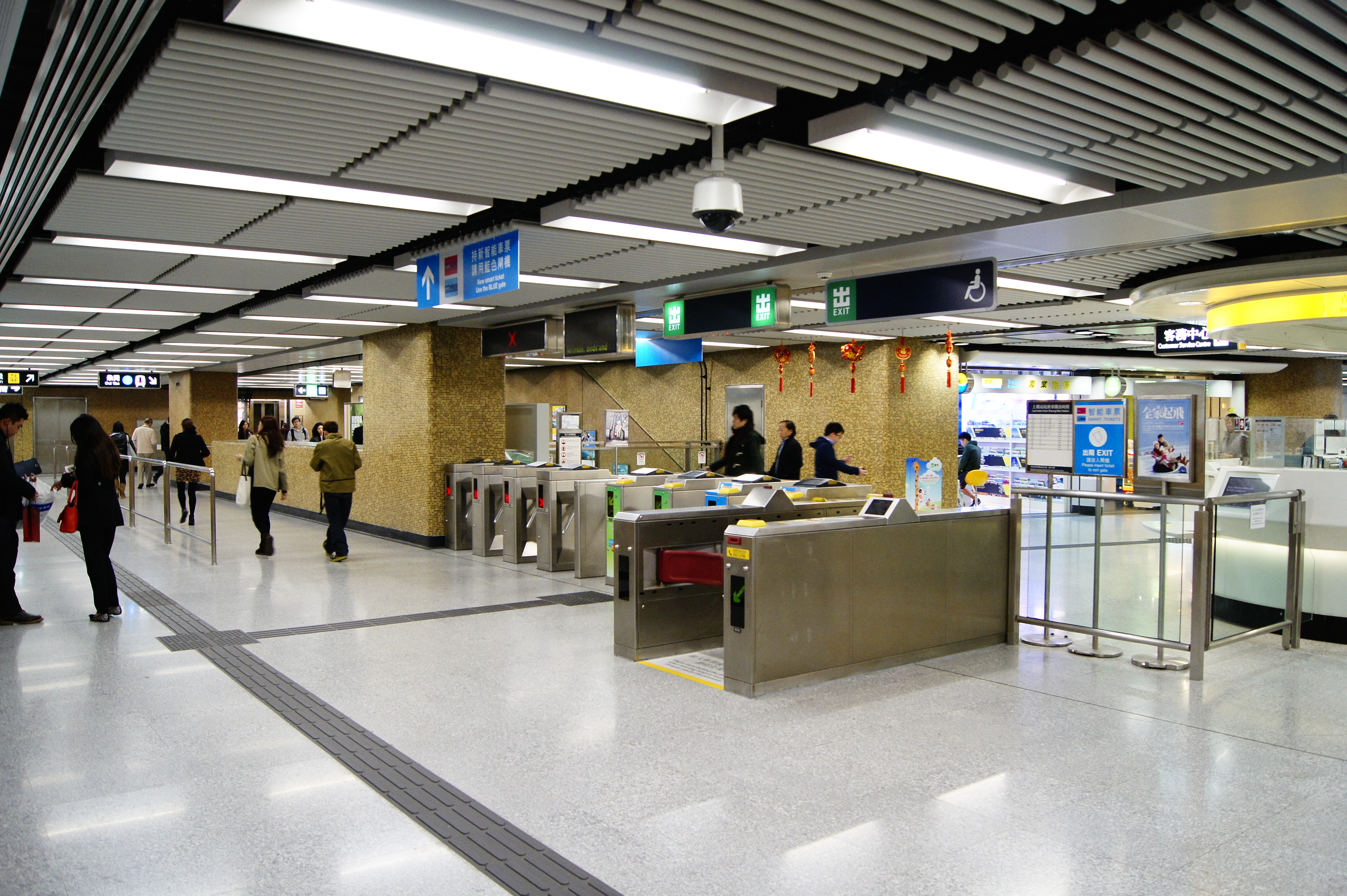
Rumsey station concourse

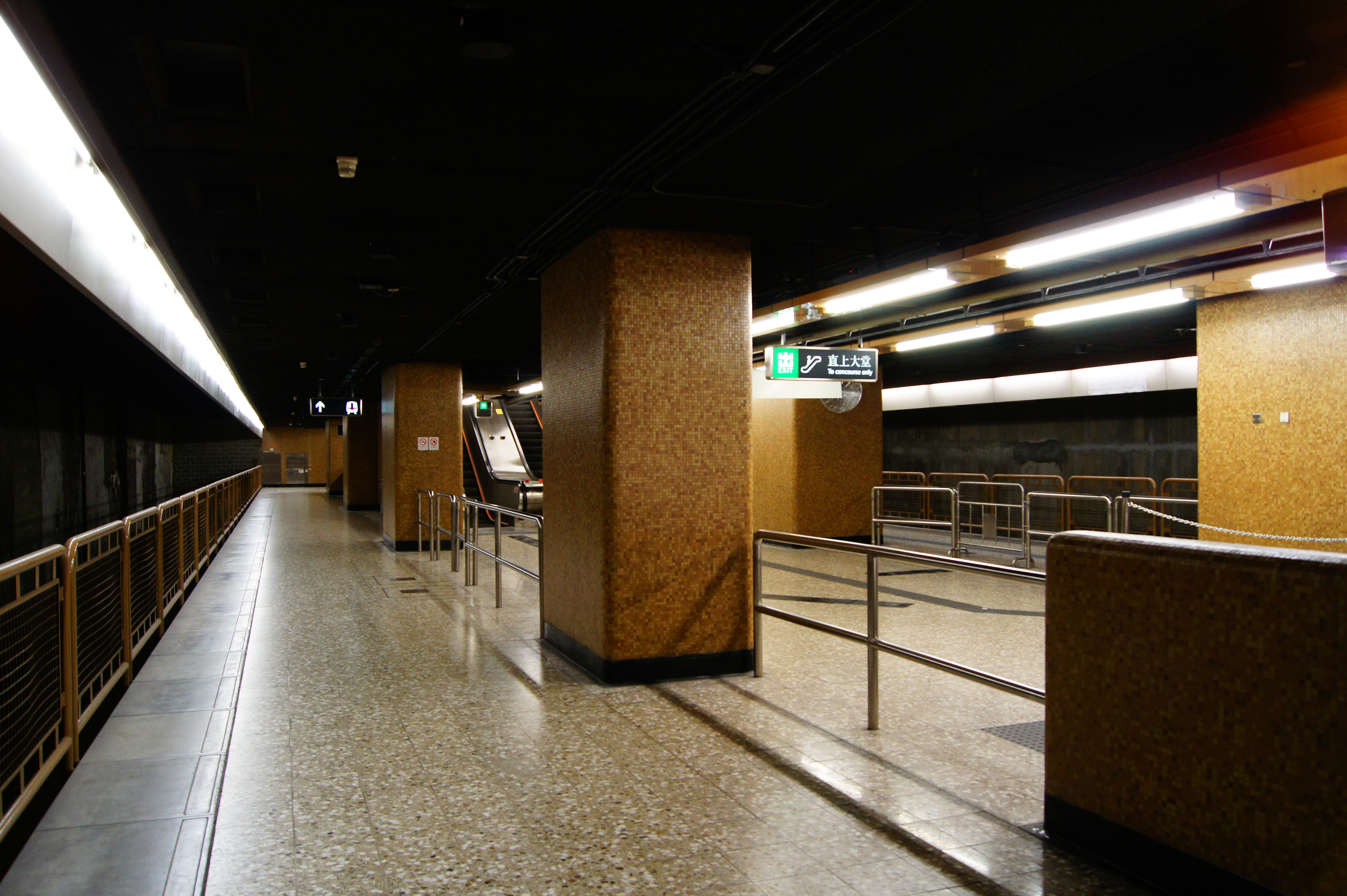
The "phantom" platforms under Rumsey Street

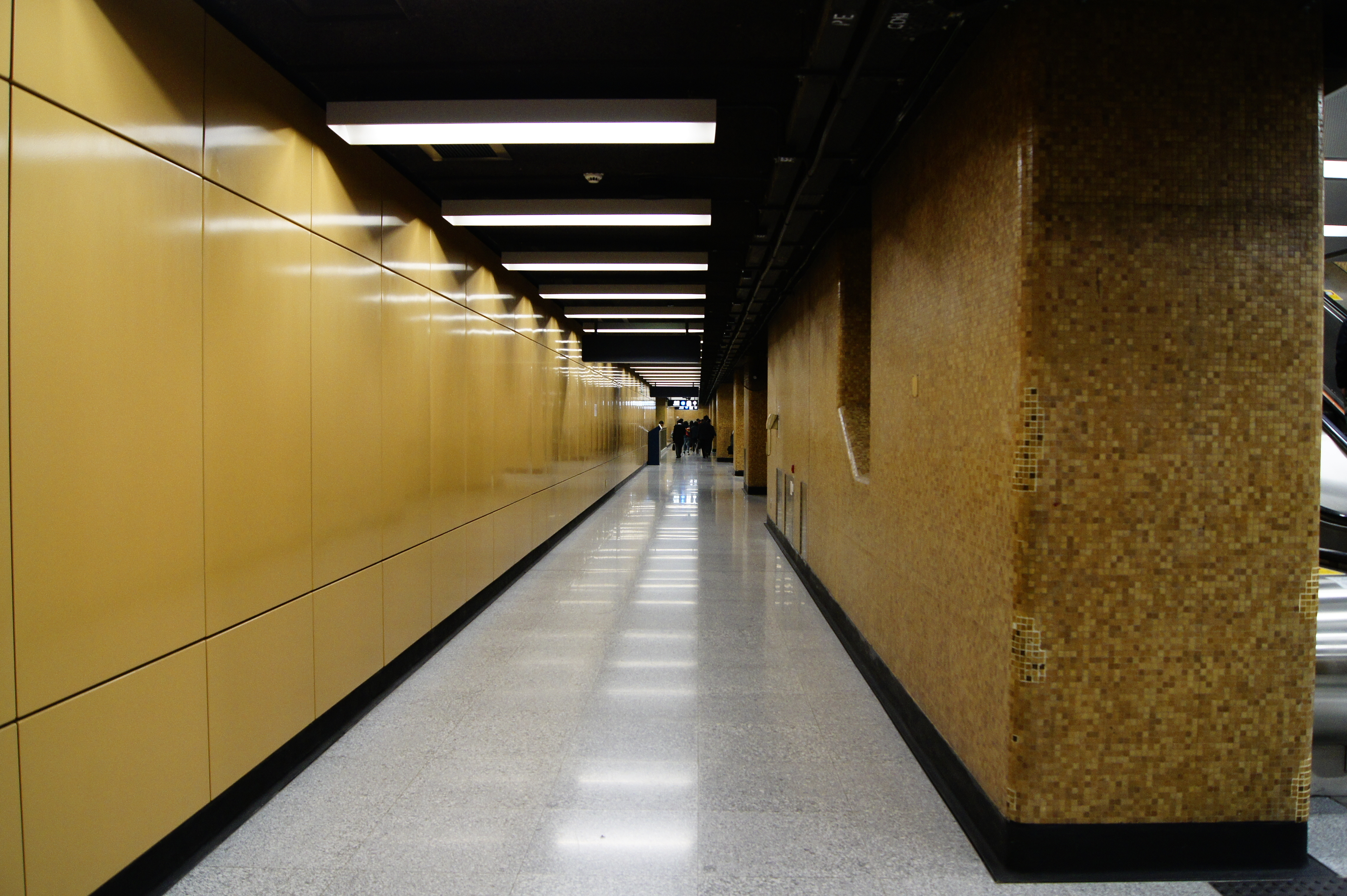
The same platforms after being walled up

The platforms of Rumsey station, originally planned as the southern terminus of the East Kowloon line, still remain in Sheung Wan station. They are located near Exit E, forming part of the passageways between the concourse and the open platforms, and they run perpendicular to the Island line platforms below. The platforms were never completed, and have a length of about three MTR EMUs (while normal trains have eight each), roughly 60 metres long; do not have tracks nor overhead power lines; and have all tunnel entrances sealed with bricks.

In 2015, one of the proposals for the usage of the Rumsey Street platforms has been for them to be the terminus of the West Island line (then a separate line). However, with the decision to make the West Island line to be an extension of the Island line instead of a separate line, there are no more proposals to utilise the Rumsey Street platforms. Since then, the MTR Corporation has covered up the abandoned platform edges with new walls to blend in with the rest of the station, and they are no longer visible.

== Entrances and exits ==
The station comprises two separate concourses, namely the central concourse near Hillier Street, and the east concourse beneath Infinitus Plaza near Rumsey Street. The non-paid areas of the two concourses are not interconnected within the station.

Central concourse

- A1: Des Voeux Road Central
- A2: Wing Lok Street, Bonham Strand, Hollywood Road
- B: Hillier Street, OTB Building, Western Market
- C: Connaught Road Central, Chu Kong Shipping Tower, Guangdong Investment Tower
- D: HK Macau Ferry Terminal, Shun Tak Centre, China Merchants Tower

East concourse

- E1/E2: Rumsey Street
- E3: Wing On Centre, Nan Fung Center, Des Voeux Road Central
- E4/E5: Infinitus Plaza

== Transport connections ==
=== Hong Kong Tramways ===
Commuters can get out of Sheung Wan station at Exits A1, B, E1 or E3 to get to the tramways on Des Voeux Road Central, for their journey further westwards to Sai Ying Pun, Shek Tong Tsui and Kennedy Town.

=== Hong Kong-Macau Ferry ===
The Hong Kong–Macau Ferry Terminal, located within Shun Tak Centre, provides frequent jetfoil, hydrofoil and hovercraft services to Macau and many other destinations in the Pearl River Delta. Exit D leads to the Ferry Terminal.
