= Man Yee Building =

Building in Central, Hong Kong

Coordinates: 22°17′01″N 114°09′22″E

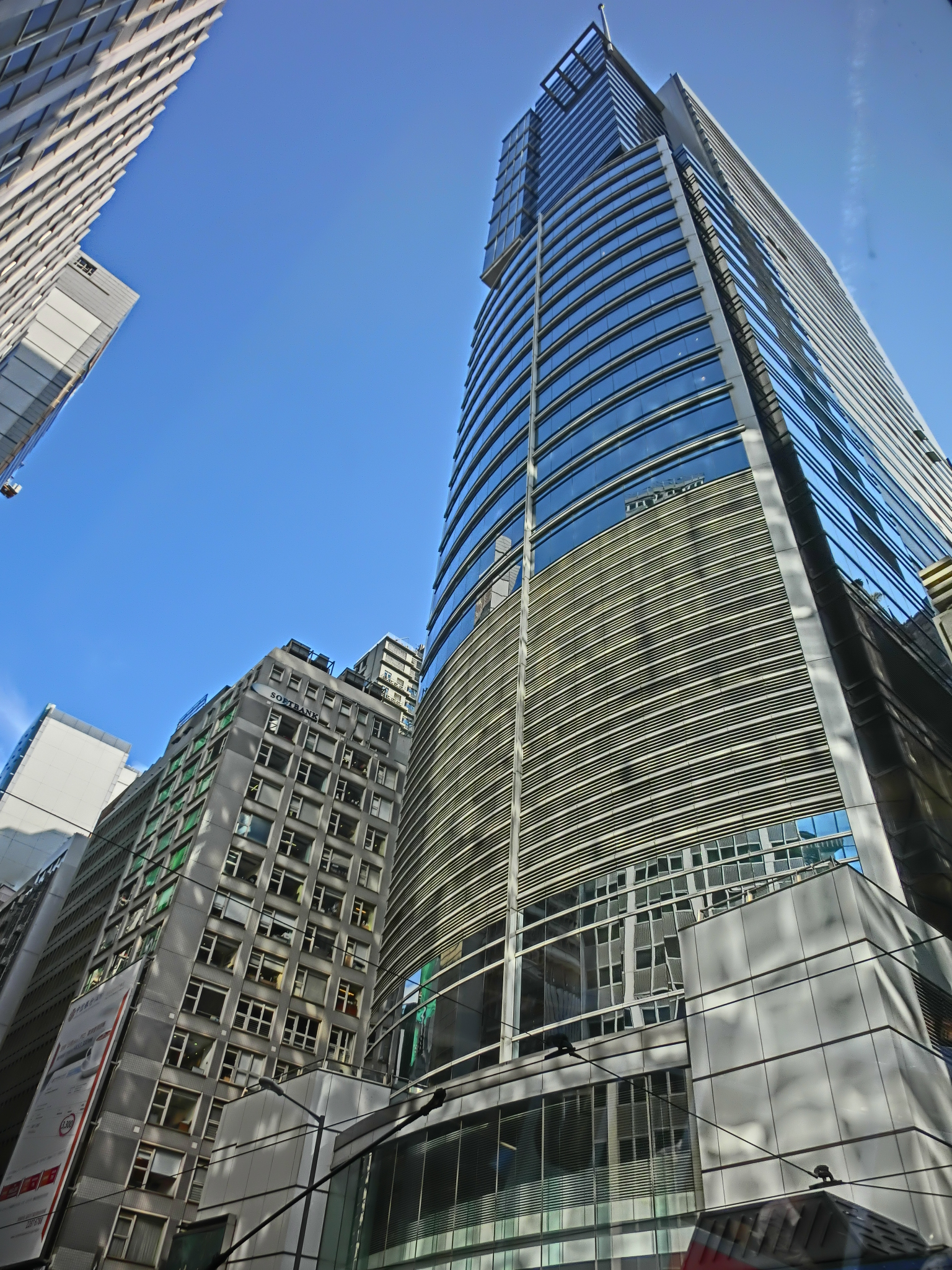
- Man Yee Building
- Traditional Chinese: 萬宜大廈
- Simplified Chinese: 万宜大厦
Transcriptions
Standard Mandarin
- Hanyu Pinyin: Wànyí Dàshà
Yue: Cantonese
- Jyutping: maan6 ji4 daai6 haa6

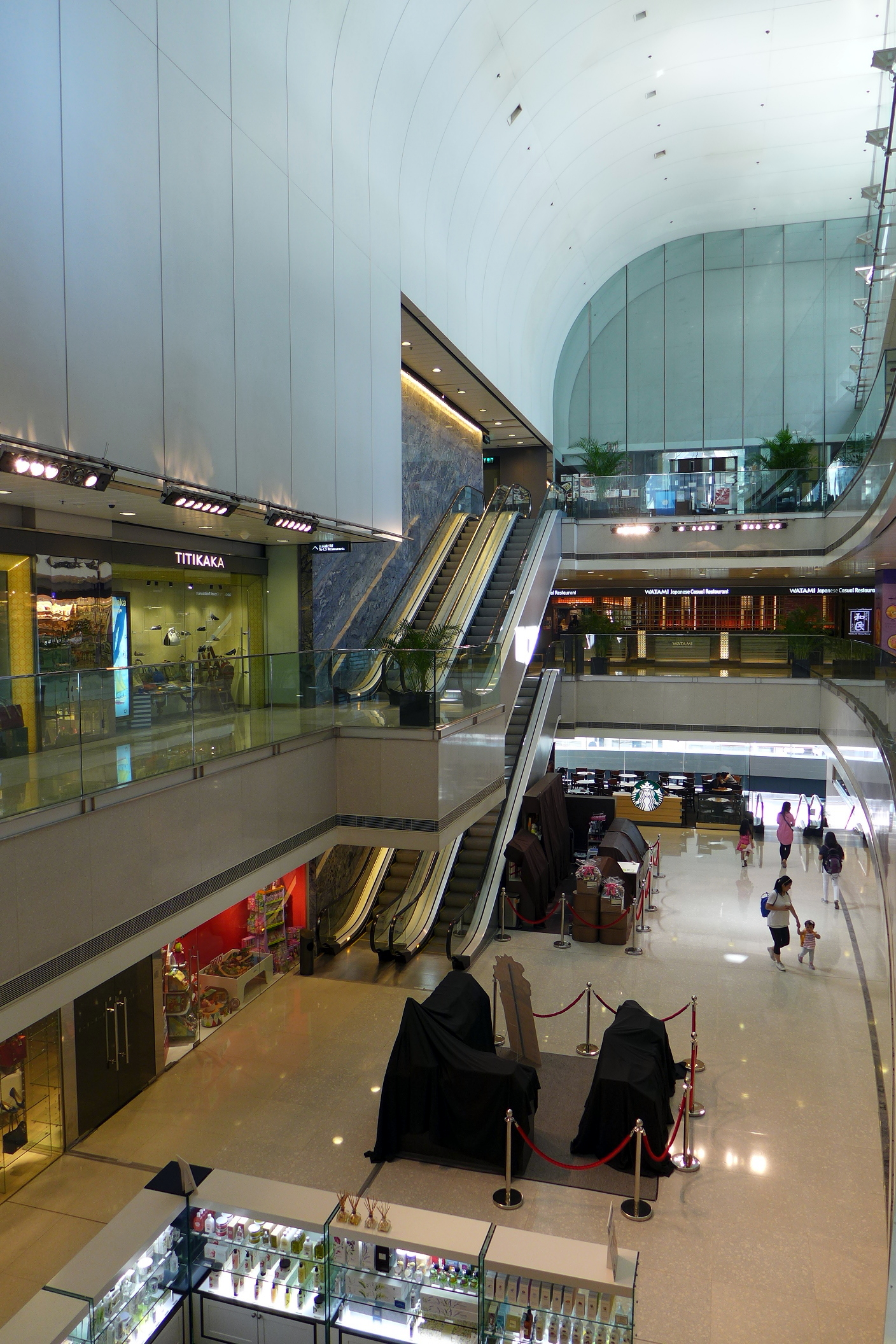
Man Yee Building Atrium

The original Man Yee Building (Chinese: 萬宜大廈; Jyutping: maan6 ji4 daai6 haa6), initially built in 1957, was the first building in Hong Kong with escalators.

Located between Queen's Road Central, Pottinger Street and Des Voeux Road Central in Central on the Hong Kong Island, the tower was demolished in 1999 and was rebuilt as a 35-storey (344 ft; 105 m) tower with total office space of 290,000 square feet (27,000 square meters). It is owned by Man Hing Hong Property Management and Agency Company Limited and designed by architectural firm Rocco Design Architects Limited.

== First generation ==
The original "Man Yee Building" is now referred to as the "Old Man Yee Building". Man Yee Building was built on a slope near the original Central waterfront, thus its entrance on the north and south differs by two floors.

The original Man Yee Building was the last building in Hong Kong with manually operated elevators, installed by Otis. Old-time skilled operators were hired.

== Shops at the mall ==
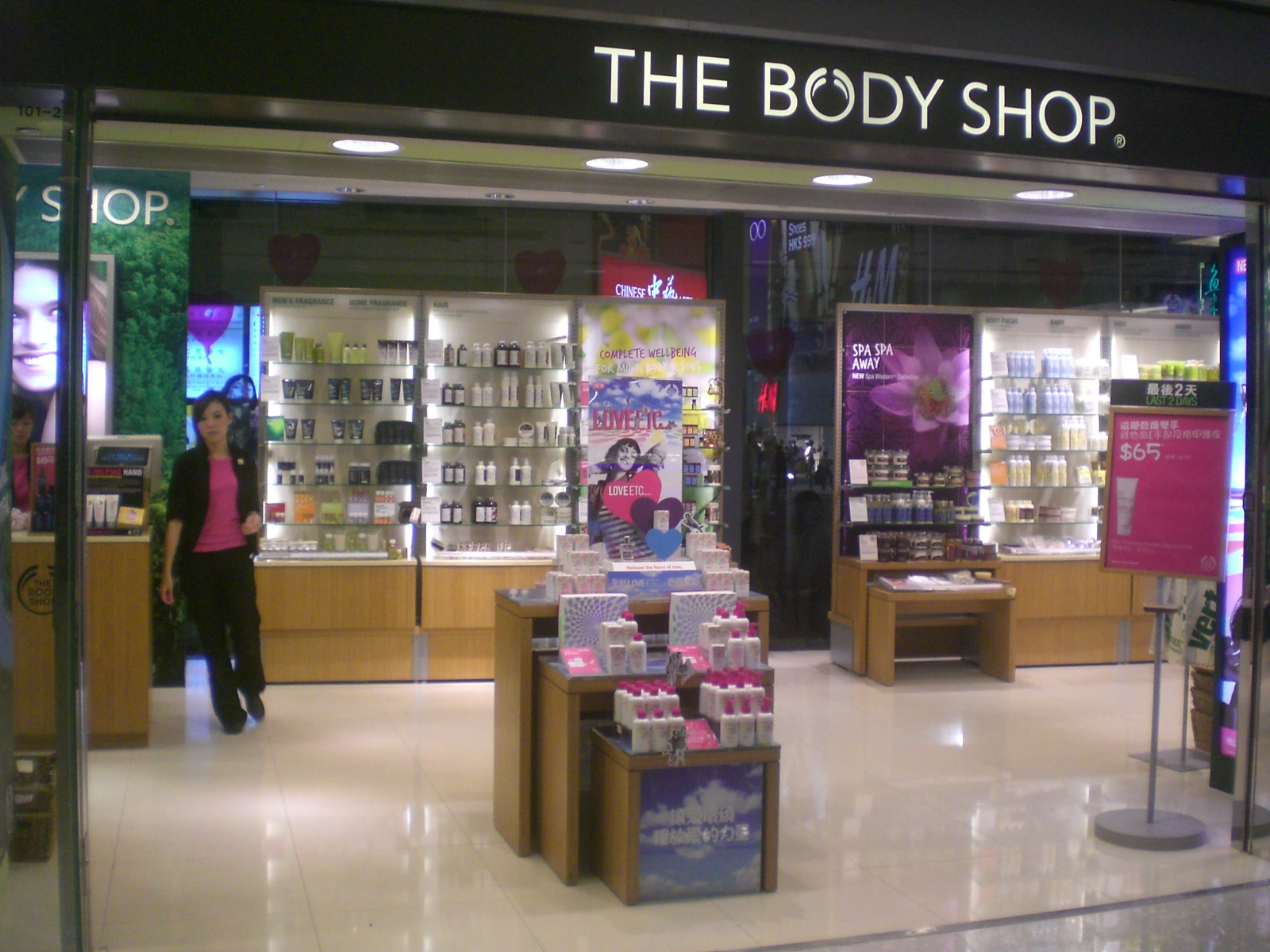
The Body Shop

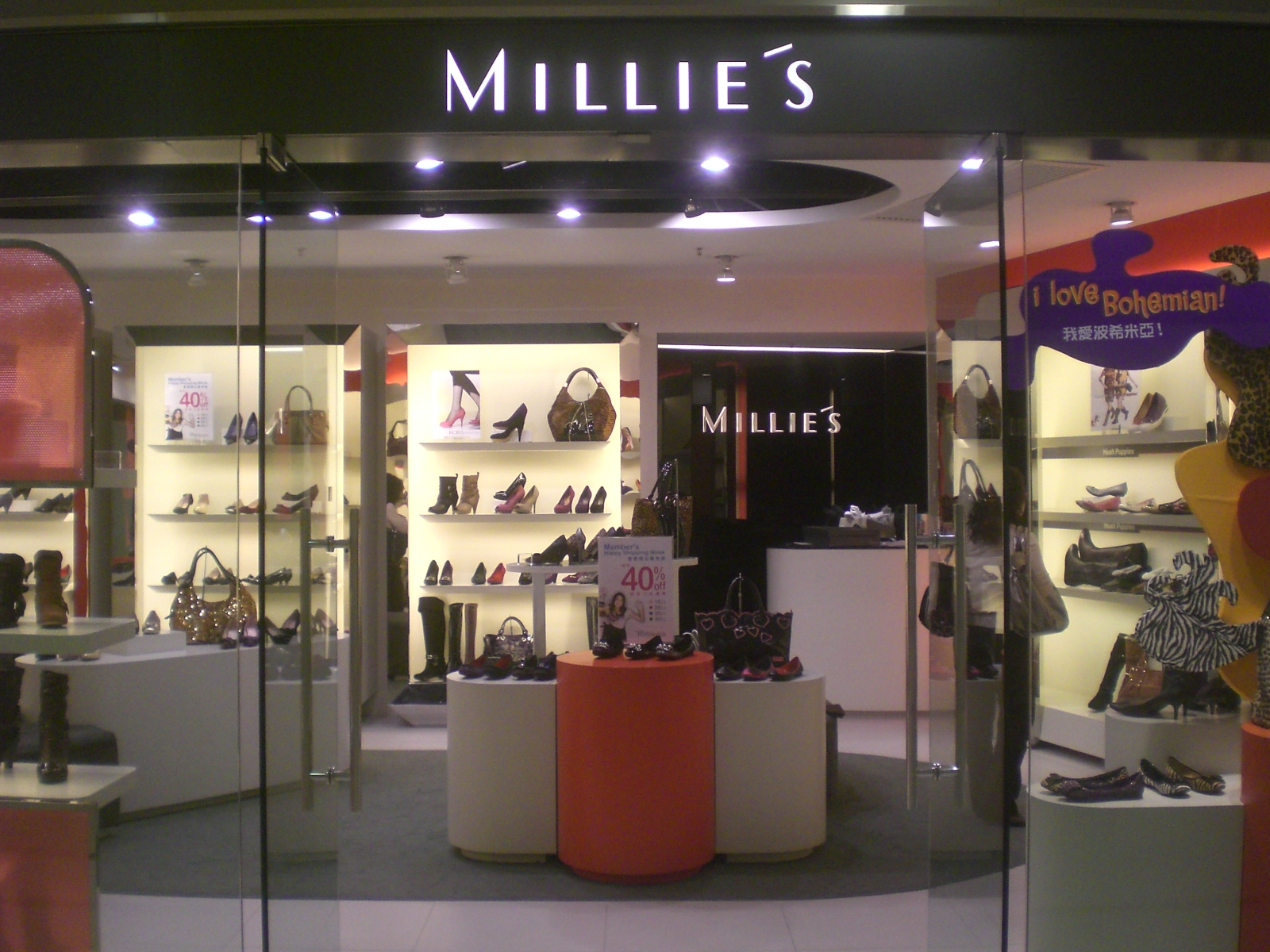
Millie's shoes

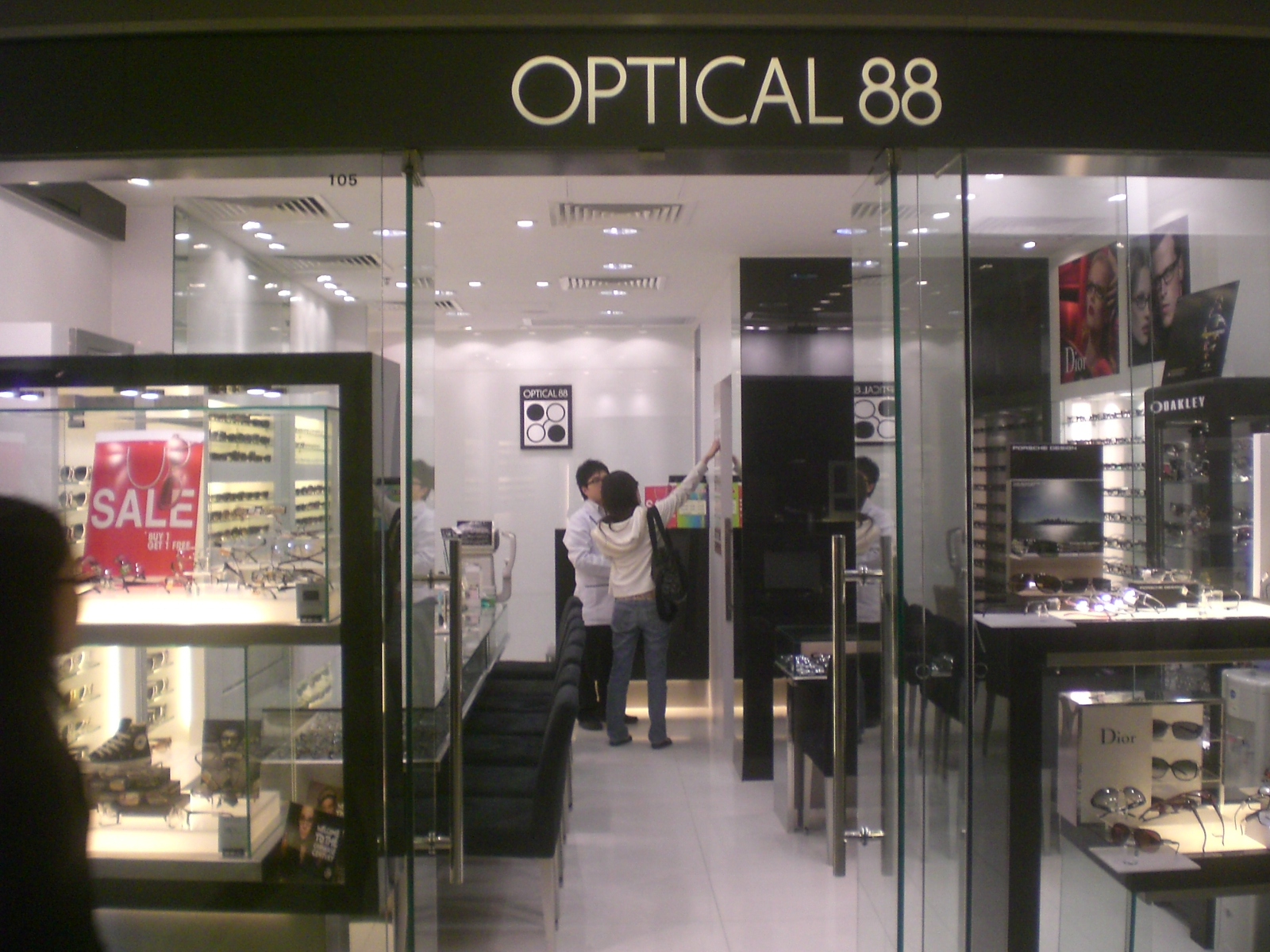
Optical 88 shop

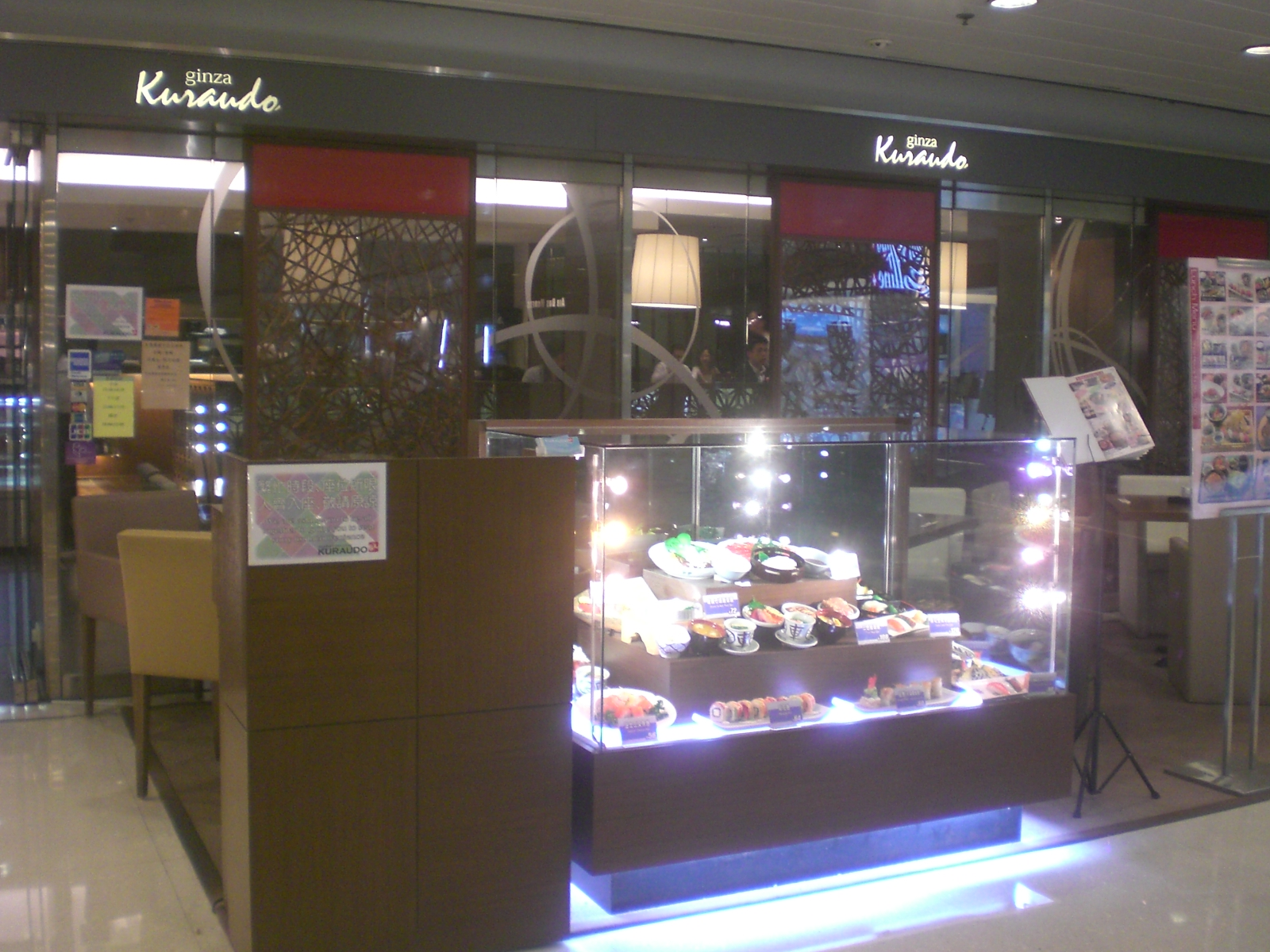
Japanese style restaurant
