= Western Market =

Building in Sheung Wan

Coordinates: 22.28723°N 114.15040°E

- 西港城
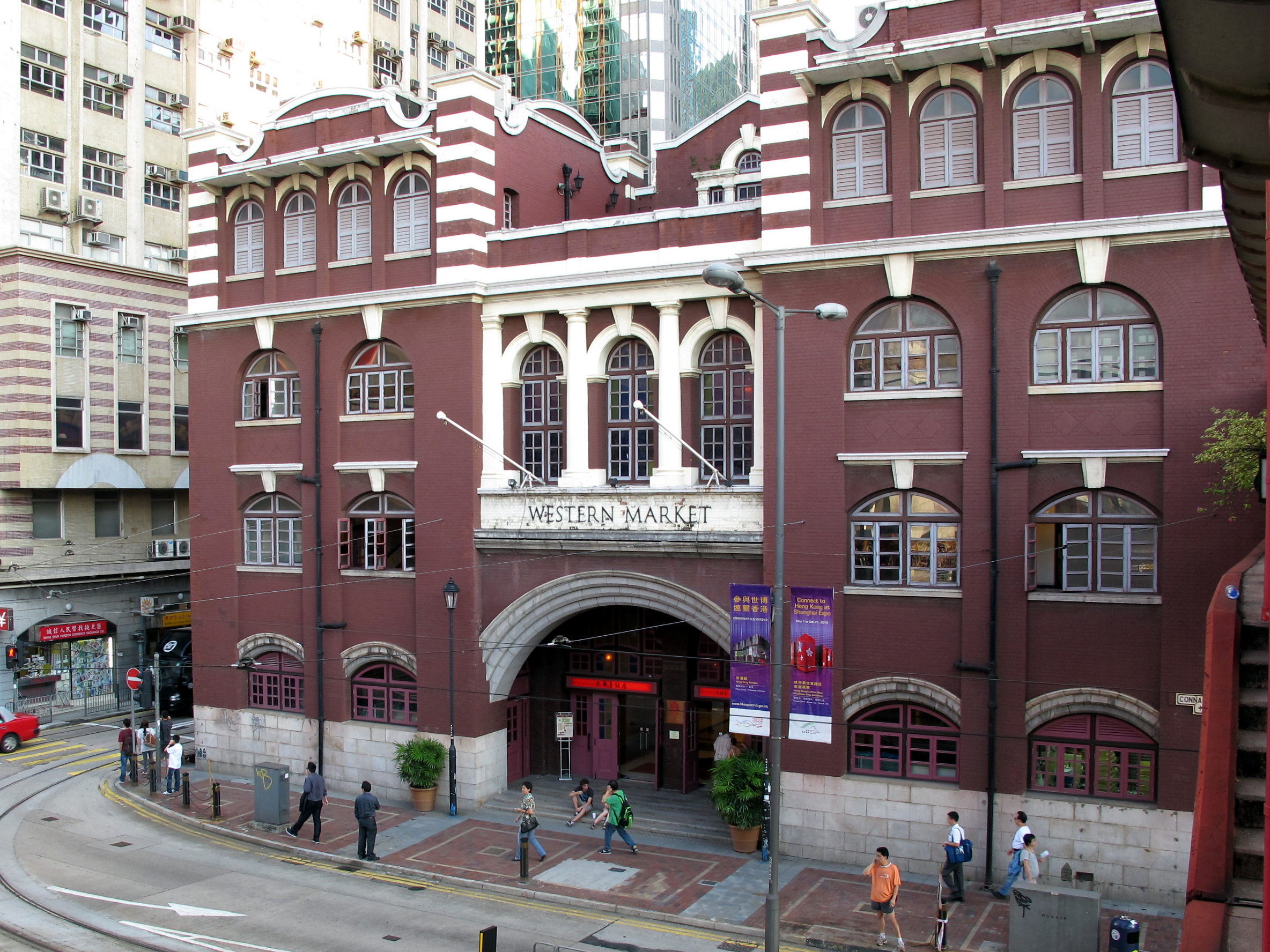
- Western Market, Connaught Road Central facade
- Interactive map of the Western Market area
- Former names: Sheung Wan Market

General information
- Architectural style: Queen Anne Revival style
- Location: Sheung Wan, 323 Des Voeux Road Central, Hong Kong
- Opened: 1858; 168 years ago (South Block); 1906; 120 years ago (North Block)
- Renovated: 1991; 35 years ago
- Demolished: 1981; 45 years ago (South Block)
- Landlord: Urban Renewal Authority

Website
- Official website

Western Market is also a former name for Plaza Miserere.

Western Market
- Traditional Chinese: 西港城
Transcriptions
Yue: Cantonese
- Yale Romanization: Sāi góng sìhng
- Jyutping: Sai^{1} gong^{2} sing^{4}

Sheung Wan Market
- Traditional Chinese: 上環街市
Transcriptions
Yue: Cantonese
- Yale Romanization: Seuhng wàahn gāai síh
- Jyutping: Soeng^{6} waan^{4} gaai^{1} si^{5}

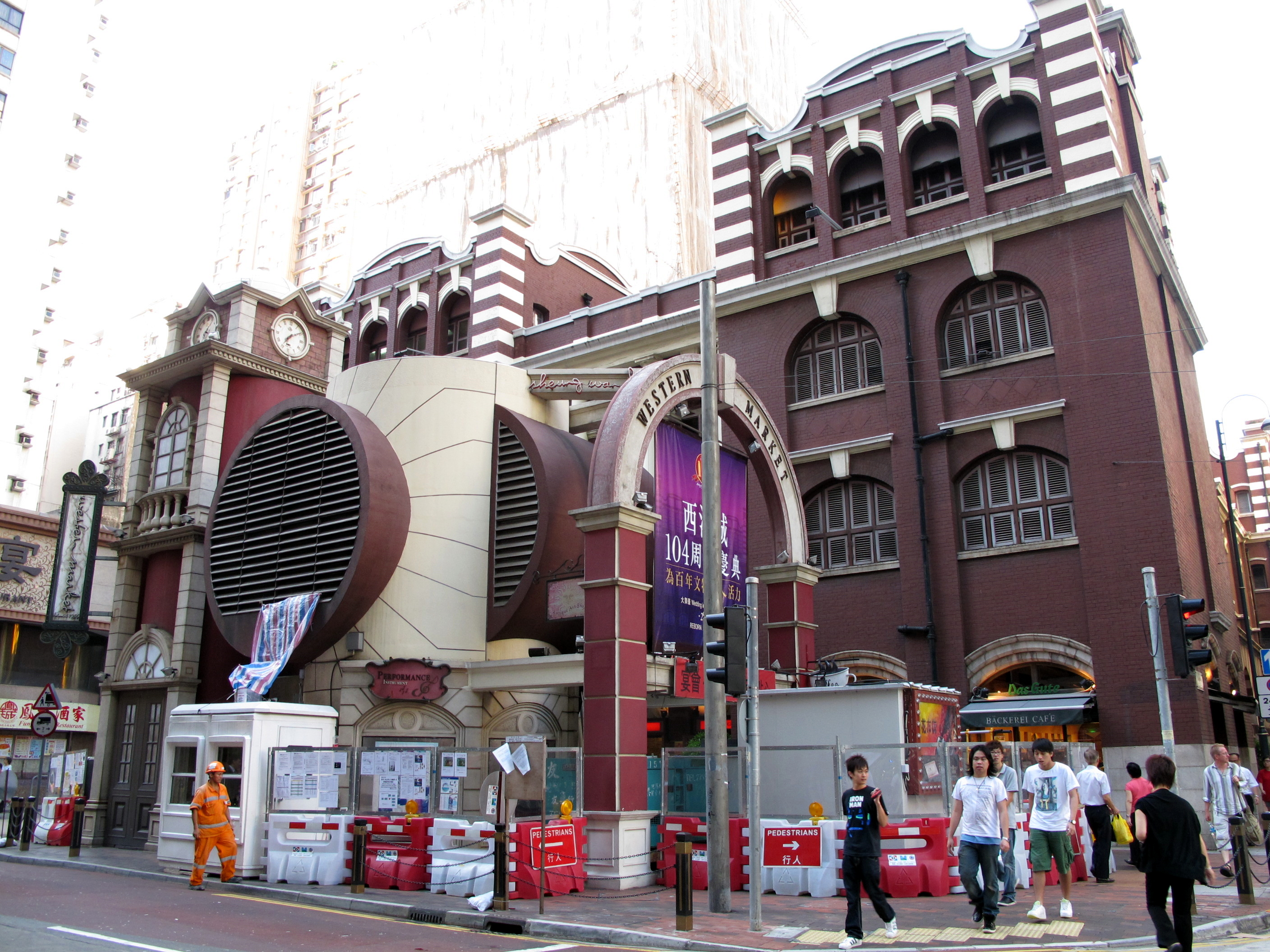
The south facade of Western Market, partly hidden by a ventilation shaft of the MTR.

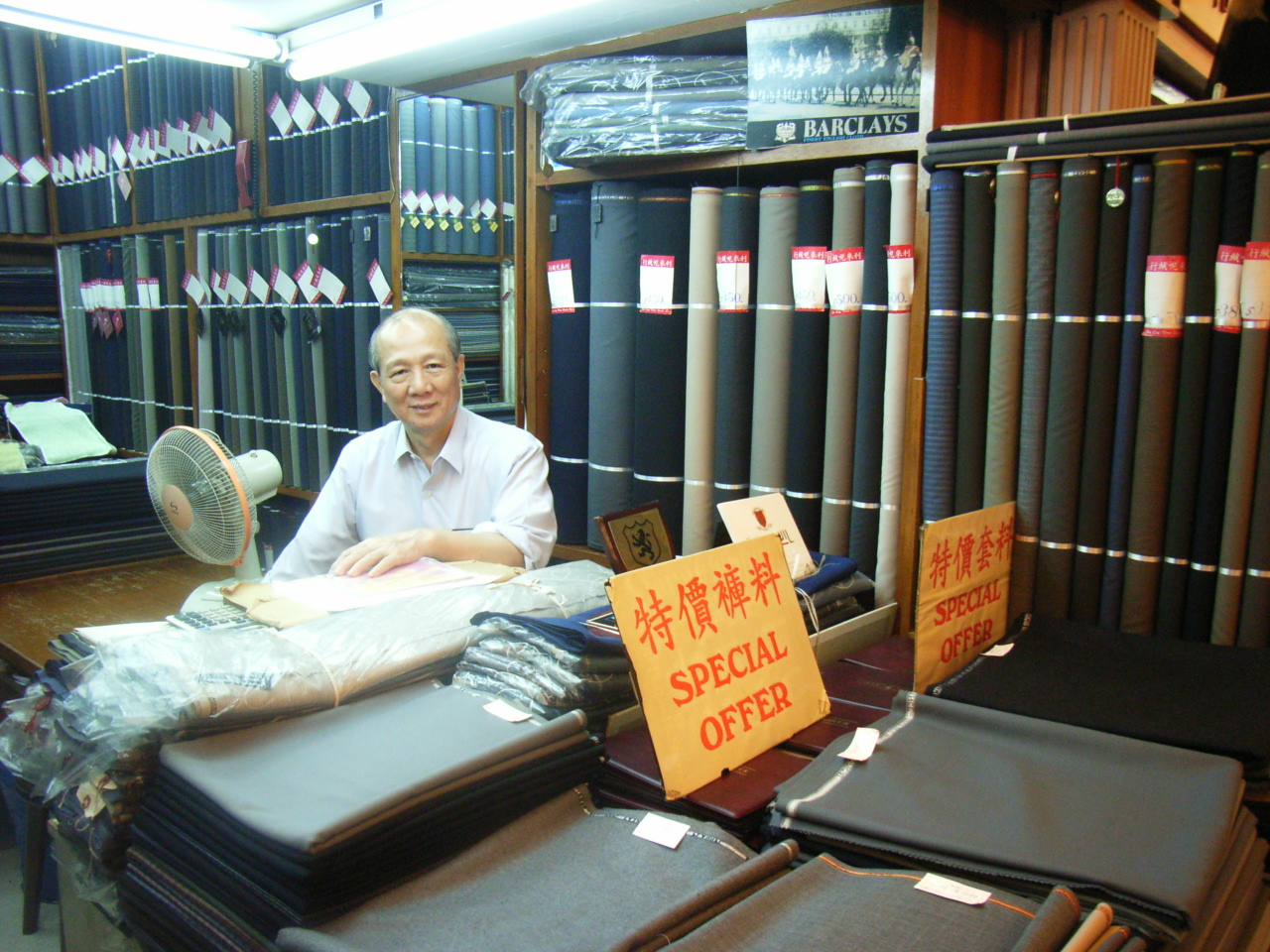
One of the current tenants.

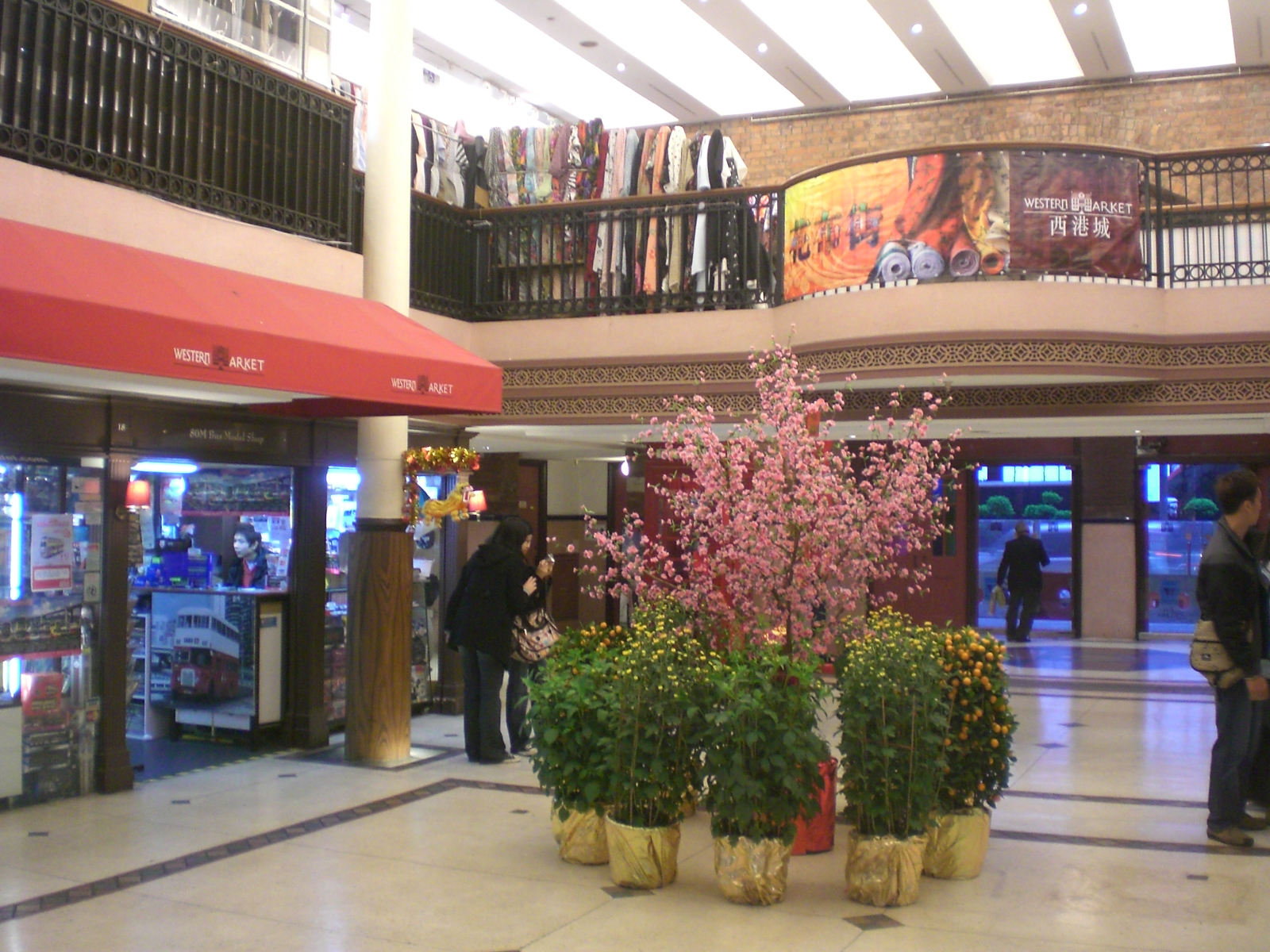
New year decoration

Western Market is one of the oldest structures in Sheung Wan, Hong Kong Island, Hong Kong. The current structure, built in 1906, was the North Block of the original Western Market. It is the oldest surviving market building in the city. The former South Block was demolished in 1981 and its site is now occupied by the Sheung Wan Complex.

== Location ==
Western Market is located at 323 Des Voeux Road Central. The market occupies a whole city block and is surrounded by the following streets: Des Voeux Road Central (South), Morrison Street (East), Connaught Road Central (North) and On Tai Street (West).

Sheung Wan Complex, now called the Sheung Wan Municipal Services Building, the site of the former South Block, is located at 345 Queen's Road Central. It is surrounded by: Queen's Road Central (South), Morrison Street (East) and Bonham Strand (North).

== History ==
Western Market came into business in September 1844. Western Market later consisted of two separate blocks: South Block (demolished) and North Block (the current "Western Market").

The South Block at Queen's Road Central was built in 1906. Vendors were evicted and moved to the Hollywood Road Temporary Market in August 1980. The Victorian period South Block was demolished thereafter and replaced by the Urban Council Sheung Wan Complex, opened in 1988. The Edwardian period North Block and the Hollywood Road Temporary Market were closed at this time and vendors were relocated to the new complex.

The North Block, smaller and more compact in design, was preserved and renovated by Land Development Corporation. This building, of the Queen Anne Revival style of the Edwardian period, was built in 1906 as an extension of the then existing Western Market. It was the former site of Harbour Office that had been moved to a reclamation area in Central District for a larger space to cope with its increasing workload. The old building of the Harbour Office was pulled down to build the North Block of Western Market.

It operated as a food market until 1988. The building was damaged during the construction of Sheung Wan station, and remediation works were undertaken afterward. Half the site was rezoned to facilitate a proposed widening of Morrison Street, which would have necessitated the building's demolition. In 1990, it was declared a historical monument and the renovated market building re-opened as "the Western Market" in 1991. Further refurnishment work was conducted in 2003.

== Architecture ==
The four-storey building is in Queen Anne Revival style that was popular in the British Empire during the late Victorian and early Edwardian periods. The brickwork on the four corner towers is "bandaged", giving a polychromatic effect. It was blue, but was later painted red to suit the architectural style.

== Tenants ==
Current tenants include:

- Bavarian-style bakery
- Chinese dessert shop
- several curio shops

On the first floor there is a wide range of fabric merchants and cafés. The top floor is a restaurant with dancing and live music and a banquet hall used for weddings. On the footbridge next to Western Market are a few old pictures with explanations from times long gone.

== Gallery ==
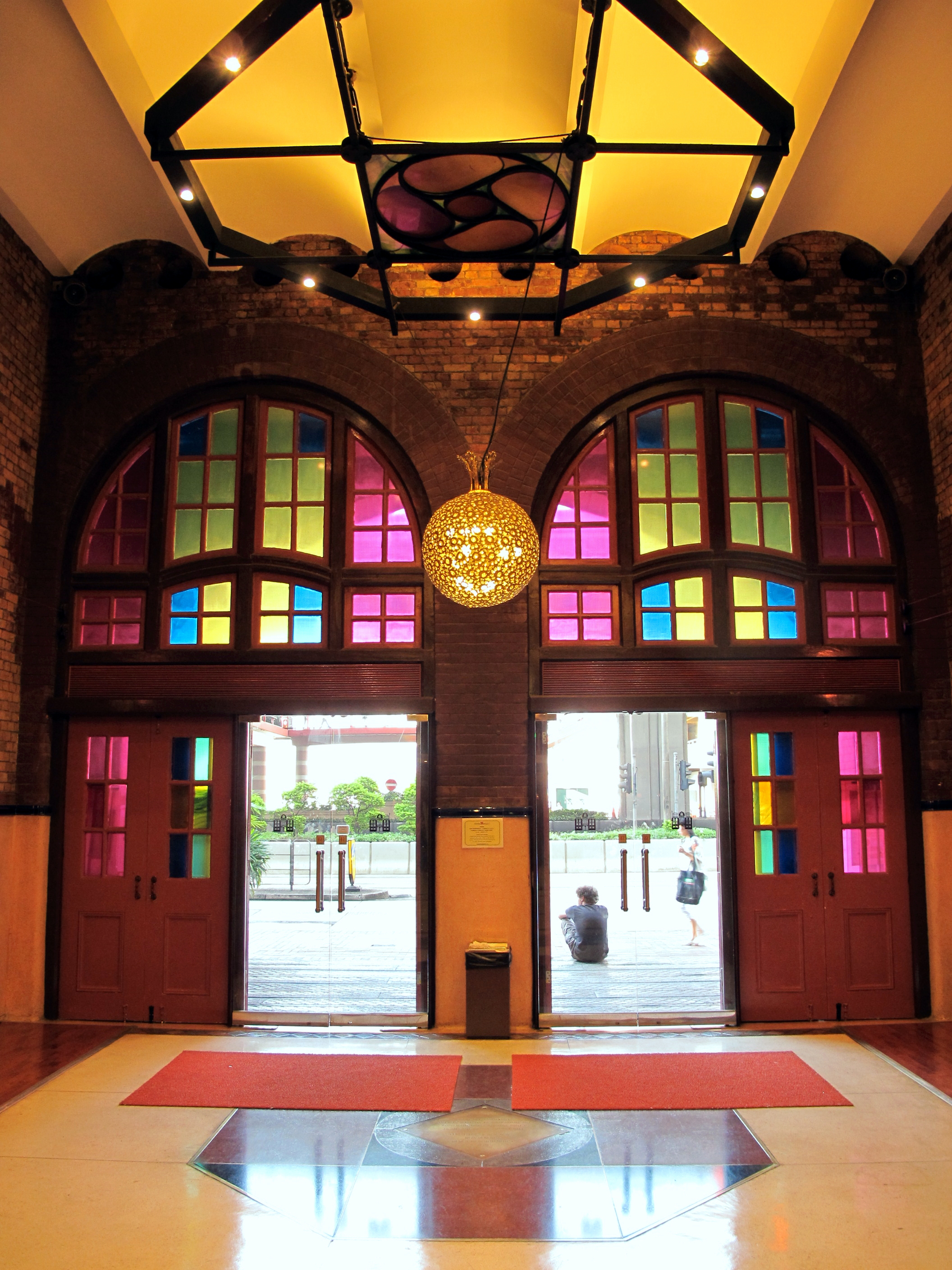
Western Market Entrance

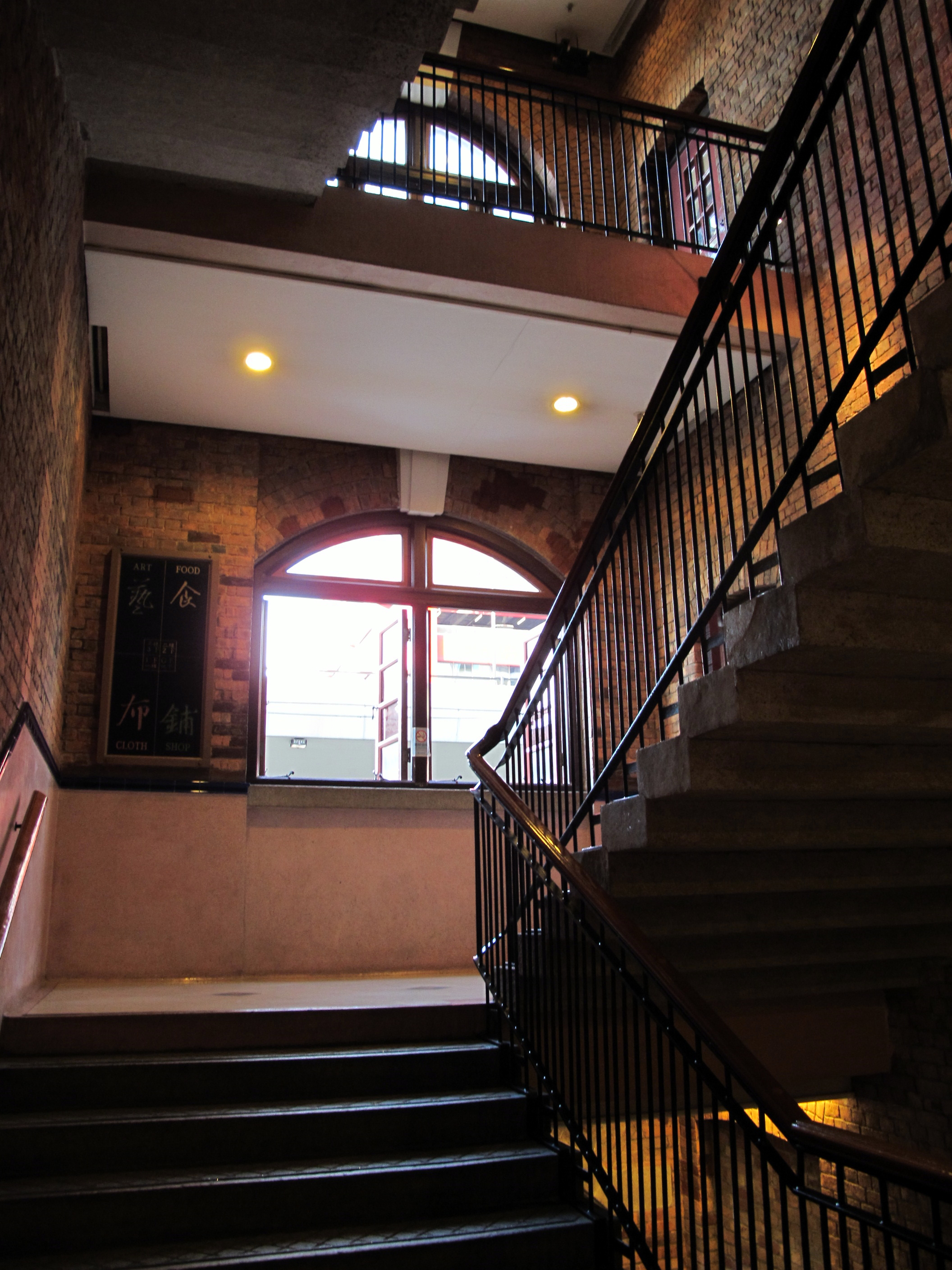
Stairs inside the building

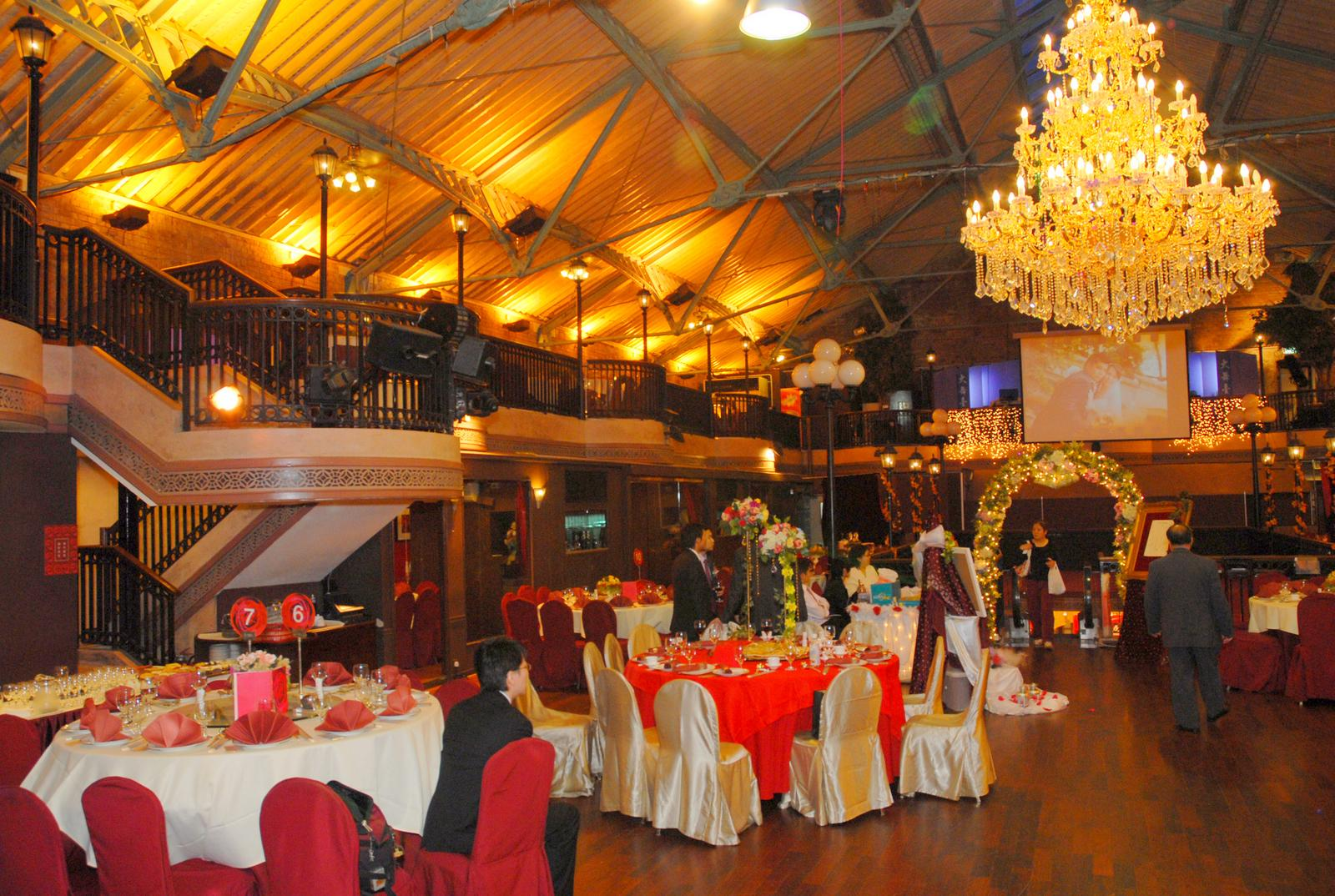
A wedding ceremony held in Western Market

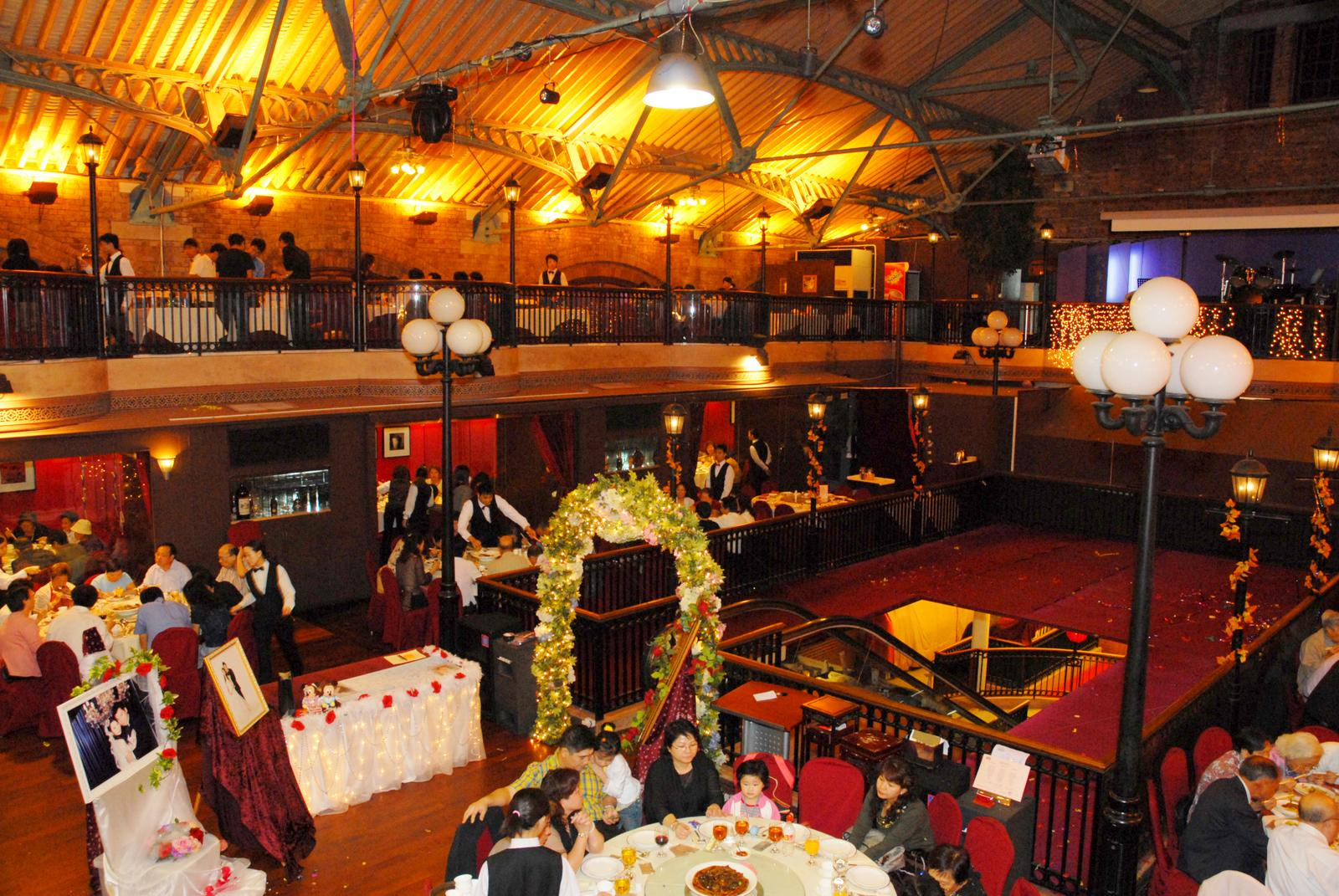
The Grand Stage, Western Market

== See also ==
- Central and Western Heritage Trail
- List of the oldest buildings and structures in Hong Kong
