= Li Yuen Street East =

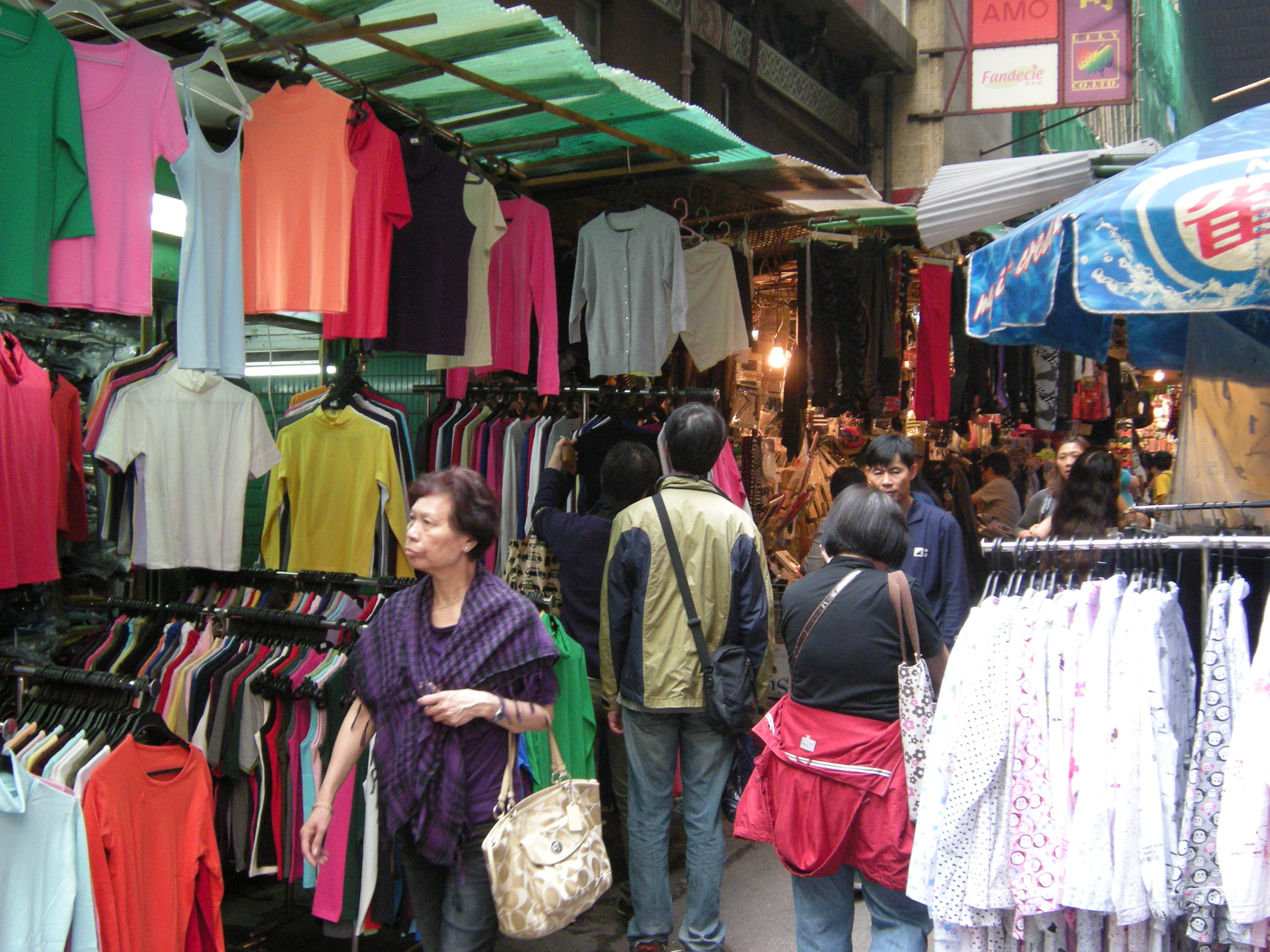
- Li Yuen Street East in 2010
- Native name: 利源東街 (Yue Chinese)
- Length: 120 m (390 ft)
- Location: Central, Hong Kong
- Coordinates: 22°16′58.26″N 114°9′23.07″E
- South end: Queen's Road Central
- North end: Des Voeux Road Central

Construction
- Commissioned: 1894; 131 years ago by Kim Li Yuen

Li Yuen Street East (Chinese: 利源東街) is a lane situated in Central on Hong Kong Island in Hong Kong. Its north-eastern end connects to Des Voeux Road Central and its southwestern tip joins Queen's Road Central. It is the first street which is named after a Chinese member of the society in colonial Hong Kong. Dubbed as the "Central’s Women Street", Li Yuen Street East is now a popular tourist spot with numerous stalls selling a wide variety of daily goods and souvenirs on the two sides of the street.

== Origin of the name ==
The name of Li Yuen Street East originates from a wealthy Chinese merchant in Hong Kong named Kim Li Yuen. Kim was a rich businessman from Taishan, Guangdong Province, China who engaged in foreign trade. In 1894, he bought a piece of newly reclaimed land in Central and engaged in property development. Houses were built for sale and a street was paved. It was named after Kim's given name, Li Yuen. As the street points towards the east, it has since then been called Li Yuen Street East.

== History ==
1890s

At the end of the 18th century, large-scale reclamation projects were carried out in an attempt to increase land supply for further development in Central. After the complete of the projects, large pieces of newly reclaimed land were available for sale. It was during this period that Kim Li Yuen bought part of the newly reclaimed land for property development. Li Yuen Street East named after Kim Li Yuen was formally founded in 1894. During that time, houses on the two sides of the streets were a hybrid of residential units and commercial outlets with the ground floor as shops and the upper floors as apartments. Street stalls that abound nowadays had not yet emerged.

Post-war period

After World War II, most of Hong Kong's newspaper offices were set up on the Li Yuen Street East. Accompanied with the newspaper offices were also a number of printing workshops. Thus, during that period, Li Yuen Street East was dubbed as the "Newspaper Street". Every early morning, newly printed newspapers were delivered manually from the street to the rest of Hong Kong. Lines of workers carrying piles of newly printed newspapers at dawn formed a unique scene of Hong Kong that time.

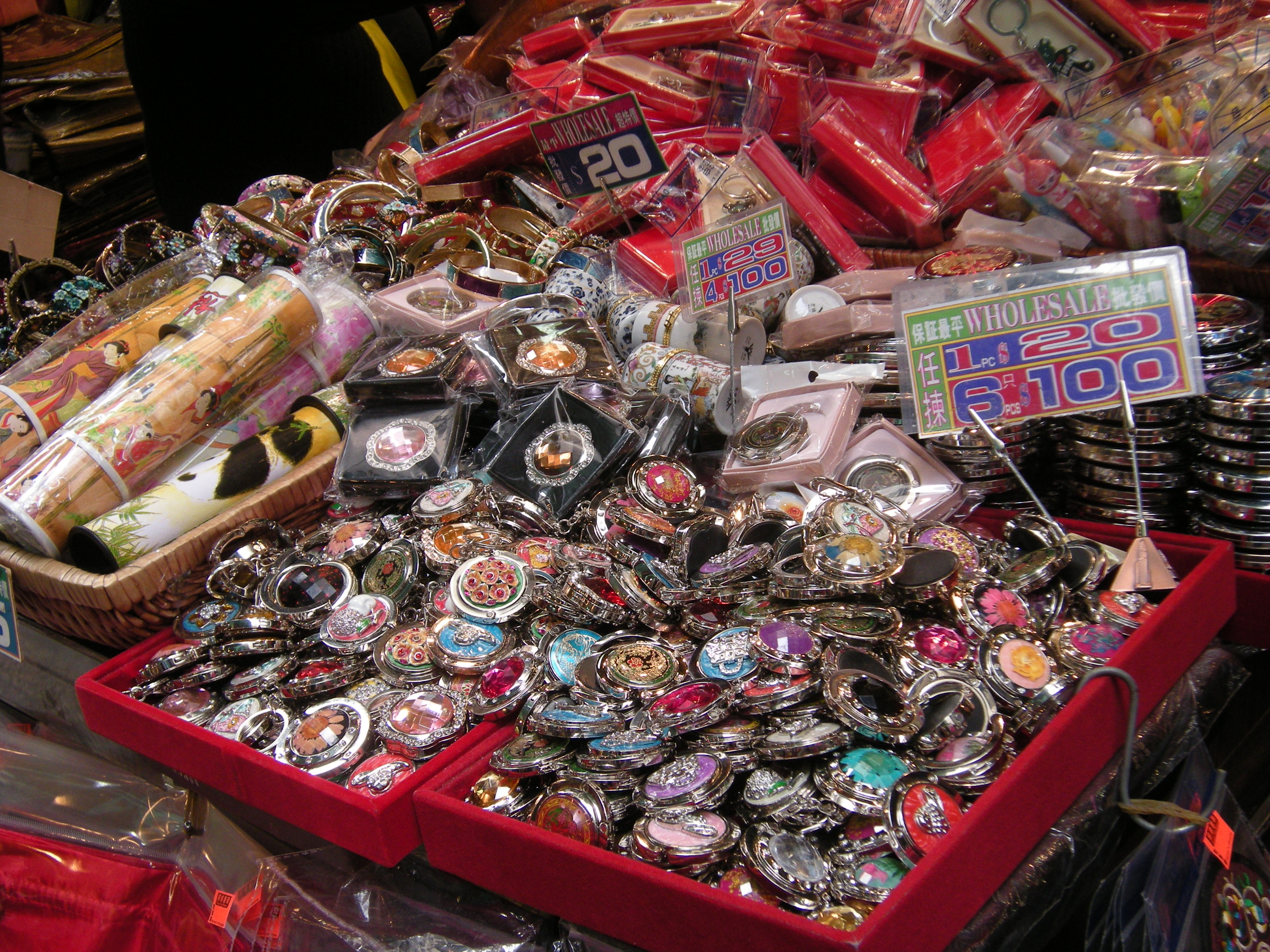
Stall selling souvenirs

Present day

The newspaper offices did not last long on Li Yuen East Street. Gradually, they relocated to other places. It was during that time street stalls selling clothes succeeded the previous newspaper offices as the familiar scene of the street. As the number of foreign tourists increased, the street stalls diversified the goods they sold. As a result, a wide variety of goods can now be found on the street including clothes, drapery, accessories, and souvenirs. Resembling the "Women Street" in Mong Kok, Kowloon, Li Yuen Street East is now dubbed as "Central’s Women Street" and has become a popular tourist spot in Central.

=== Incidents ===
Subsidence

On 25 April 2007, a land subsidence occurred on the Li Yuen Street East under heavy rain. The subsided area was the junction connecting the south-western tip of the street and Queen's Road Central. Five stalls and four people fell into the 4-metre hole. All of the victims were rescued by the passers-by promptly. There was no serious injury. After investigation, the Buildings Department suggested that loosened soil owing to a nearby groundwork project and persistent heavy rain triggered the event.

== Intersections ==
The entire route is in Central District.

Location	km	mi	Destinations	Notes
0.00	0.00	Queen's Road Central	Pedestrianized	
0.12	0.075	Des Voeux Road Central		
1.000 mi = 1.609 km; 1.000 km = 0.621 mi: Closed/former

== See also ==
- List of streets and roads in Hong Kong
