= Rumsey Street =

Street in Sheung Wan, Hong Kong

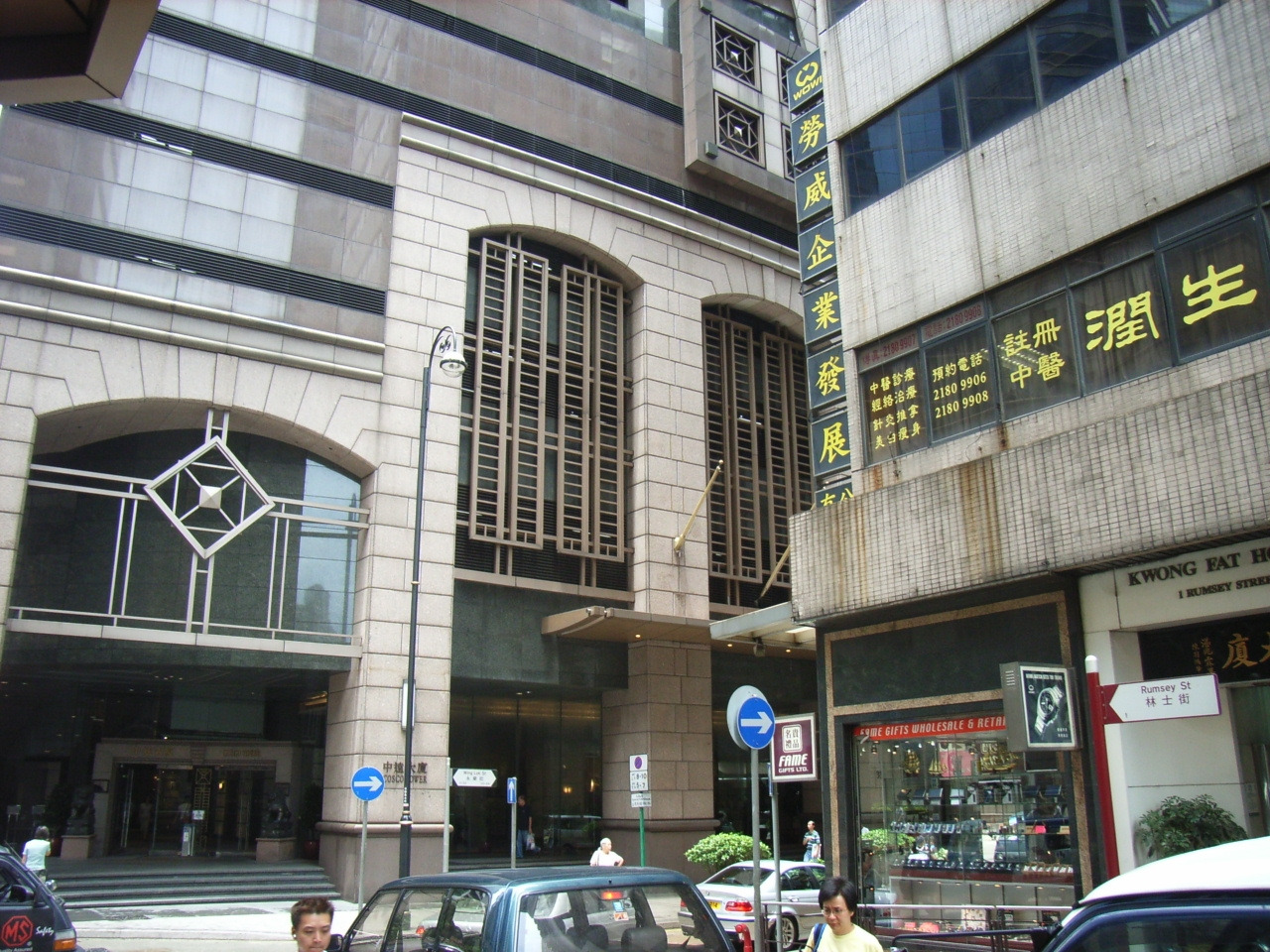
The conjunction with Wing Lok Street, Sheung Wan in July 2006

Rumsey Street (Chinese: 林士街) is a street in Sheung Wan on the Hong Kong Island of Hong Kong. It begins at Wing Lok Street near COSCO Tower, crossing Des Voeux Road Central and Connaught Road Central, and reaches the Victoria Harbour.

== Name ==
The street was named in 1905 after Robert Murray Rumsey, the Harbour Master of Hong Kong Government.

== Features ==
Wing On Department Store is located at the street.

Beneath the street is the unused MTR platform of Rumsey station. The station was for an abandoned plan of East Kowloon line. The platform was later incorporated into Sheung Wan station.

== See also ==
- List of streets and roads in Hong Kong
