= Pokfield Road Bus Terminus =

Bus station in Hong Kong

Coordinates: 22°16′54″N 114°07′57″E

Pokfield Road Bus Terminus 蒲飛路巴士總站
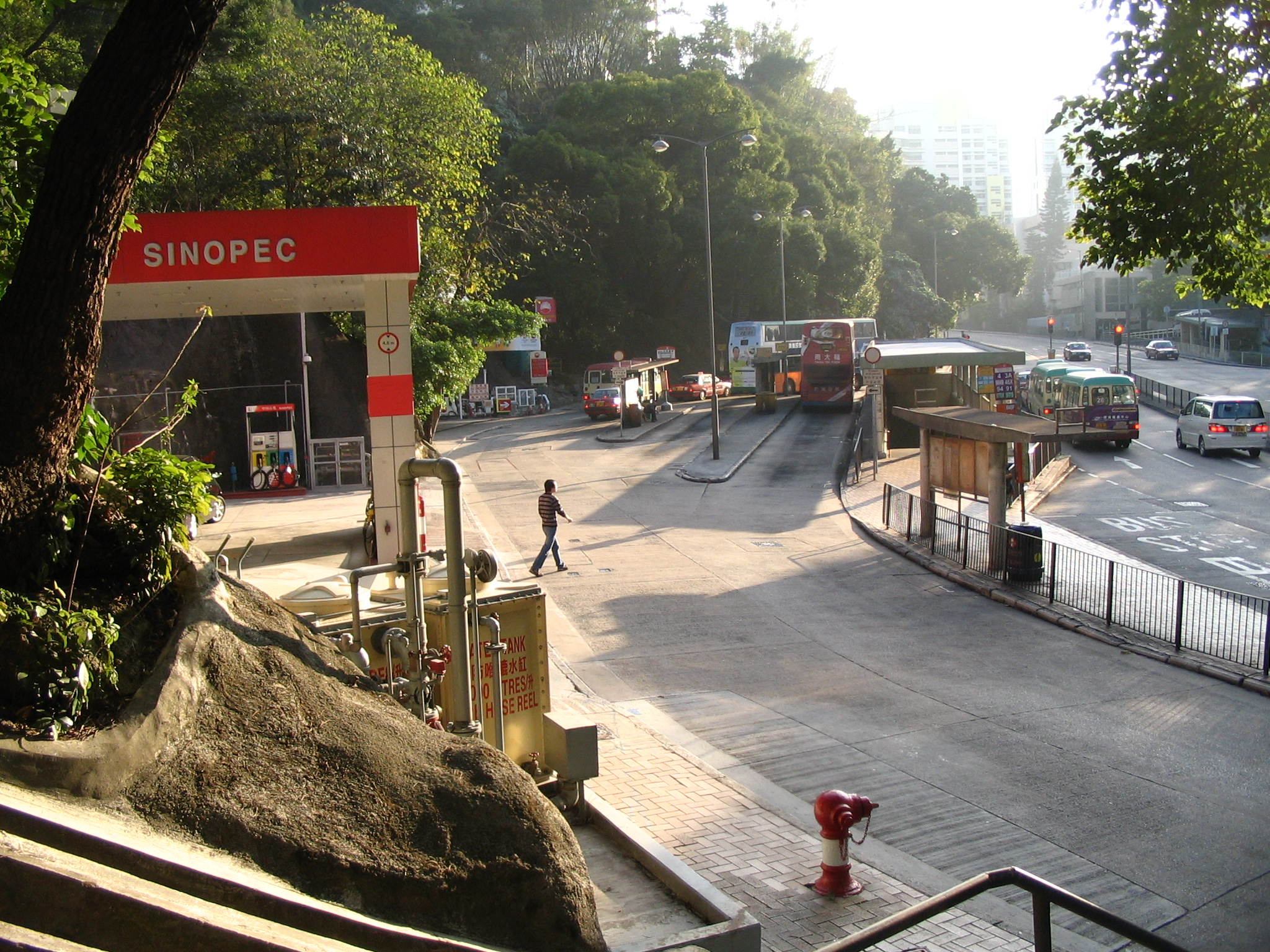

General information
- Location: Intersection of Pok Fu Lam Road and Pokfield Road; Pok Fu Lam Road （Mount Davis Road to Sai Ying Pun） Central and Western
- Bus routes: Terminating: Citybus Route 3B New World First Bus Route 23 Cross-harbour Citybus and Kowloon Motor Bus Route 103; Via: Citybus Routes 7, 37A, 40, 40M, 71, 90B and 973 NWFB Routes 3A, 4, 4X, 30X, 46X, 91, 94, 970 and 970X
- Connections: Major streets nearby: Pok Fu Lam Road、Pokfield Road; Major structures/sights nearby: Academic Terrace、St. John's College of the HKU
Location

The Pokfield Road Bus Terminus (Chinese: 蒲飛路巴士總站) is a bus terminus located on Pok Fu Lam Road, Central and Western District, Hong Kong.

== Location ==
The terminus is located next to a slope on the side of Pok Fu Lam Road southbound carriageway near the intersection of Pokfield Road.
