= Des Voeux Road =

Thoroughfare in Hong Kong

Coordinates: 22°16′58.62″N 114°9′25.25″E

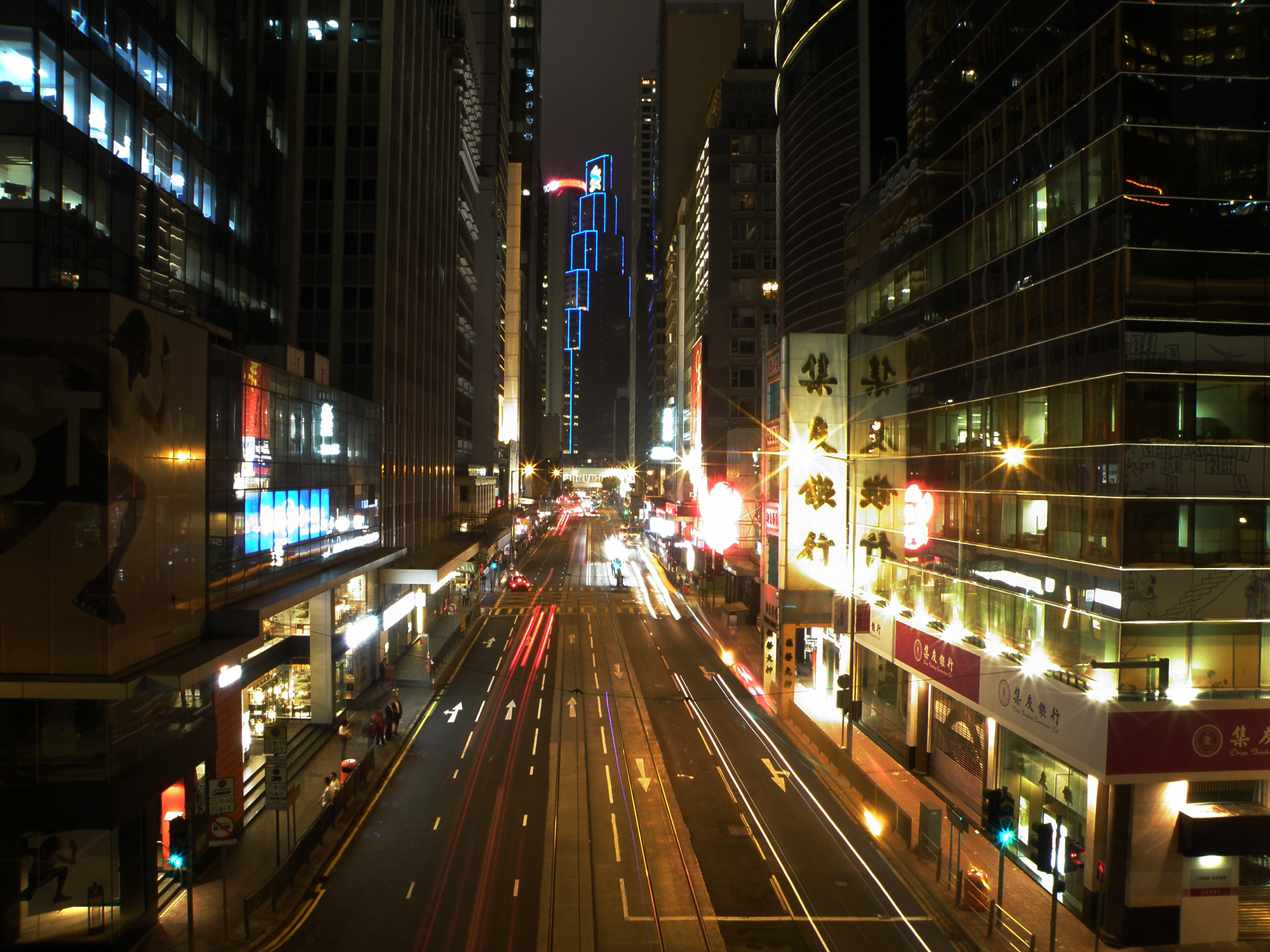
- Des Voeux Road Central in Central in March 2015
- Interactive map of Des Voeux Road
- Native name: 德輔道 (Yue Chinese)
- Former names: Shōwa-dori (during Japanese Occupation, 1942–1945)
- Namesake: William Des Vœux
- Location: Central and Western District, Hong Kong Island, Hong Kong

Construction
- Construction start: 1857; 169 years ago
- Completed: 1904; 122 years ago

Des Voeux Road Central
- Traditional Chinese: 德輔道中
- Simplified Chinese: 德辅道中
Transcriptions
Standard Mandarin
- Hanyu Pinyin: Défǔ Dào Zhōng
Yue: Cantonese
- Yale Romanization: dak1 fu6 dou6 jung1

Des Voeux Road West
- Traditional Chinese: 德輔道西
- Simplified Chinese: 德辅道西
Transcriptions
Standard Mandarin
- Hanyu Pinyin: Défǔ Dào Xī
Yue: Cantonese
- Yale Romanization: dak1 fu6 dou6 sai1

Des Voeux Road Central (Chinese: 德輔道中; Jyutping: dak1 fu6 dou6 zung1) and Des Voeux Road West (德輔道西; dak1 fu6 dou6 sai1) are two roads on the north shore of Hong Kong Island, Hong Kong. They were named after the 10th Governor of Hong Kong, Sir William Des Vœux. The name was sometimes spelt with the ligature œ in pre-war documents but is nowadays spelt officially without the ligature, as Des Voeux Road (德輔道; dak1 fu6 dou6).

== History ==
Beginning in 1857, the northern shore of Hong Kong Island (also known as Victoria City) underwent a series of reclamations under then-Governor Sir John Bowring. The first phase of the Praya Reclamation Scheme had a direct effect on this current street, which used to be known as Praya Central during the colonial Hong Kong era. Bowring's plans were opposed by British merchants who held lands in the Central area, and in response, the government instead commenced work in land reclamation in the Chinese-populated Western District. By the time the reclamation was extended to Central, the newly reclaimed land in Western had already been settled, and there was a discontinuity between the two roads running along the western and middle portions of the reclaimed shoreline. Upon completion, the roads were named Bowring Praya West and Bowring Praya Central respectively.

Another series of extensive reclamation projects began in 1887 under then-Governor Des Voeux. Upon completion in 1904, Bowring Praya West and Bowring Praya Central (which by then were situated inland from the shoreline) were respectively renamed Des Voeux Road West and Des Voeux Road Central per the orders of then-Colonial Secretary and acting Governor Francis Fleming during the Duke of Connaught's visit to Hong Kong in 1890.

From 1942 to 1945, the road was renamed Shōwa-dori by the Japanese occupation government.

== Des Voeux Road Central ==
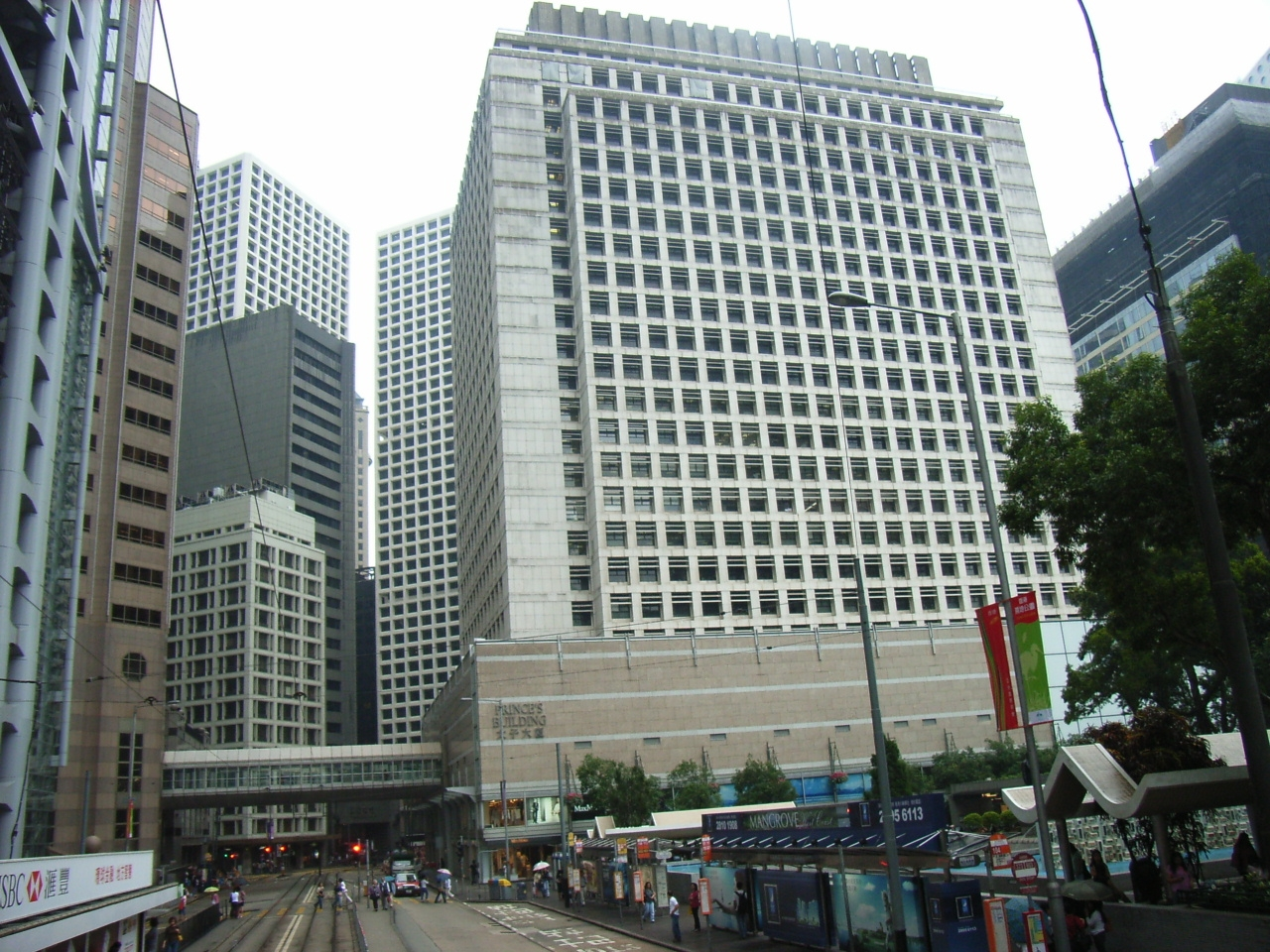
Section of Des Voeux Road Central in May 2006, between the HSBC Main Building and Statue Square, looking toward Prince's Building.

Des Voeux Road Central runs from Western to Central. It begins at the intersection with On Tai Street in Western and merges with Queen's Road Central where it becomes Queensway (and, later, Hennessy Road). Landmarks along Des Voeux Road Central include:

- Bank of China Building (#2A), which houses the China Club
- HSBC Building
- 9 Queen's Road Central
- Statue Square
- Prince's Building
- Alexandra House
- Standard Chartered Bank Building
- The Landmark
- World-wide House
- Central Market
- Hang Seng Bank Headquarters Building (#83)
- Man Yee Building
- Wing On House (#71)
- Western Market (#323)

== Des Voeux Road West ==
Des Voeux Road West runs from Sheung Wan to Western Shek Tong Tsui. It reaches an alignment several blocks down at the junction with Connaught Road West (where the latter becomes Shing Sai Road) and becomes Kennedy Town Praya in Shek Tong Tsui at the western end of Queen's Road West.

== Proposal to pedestrianise Des Voeux Road Central ==
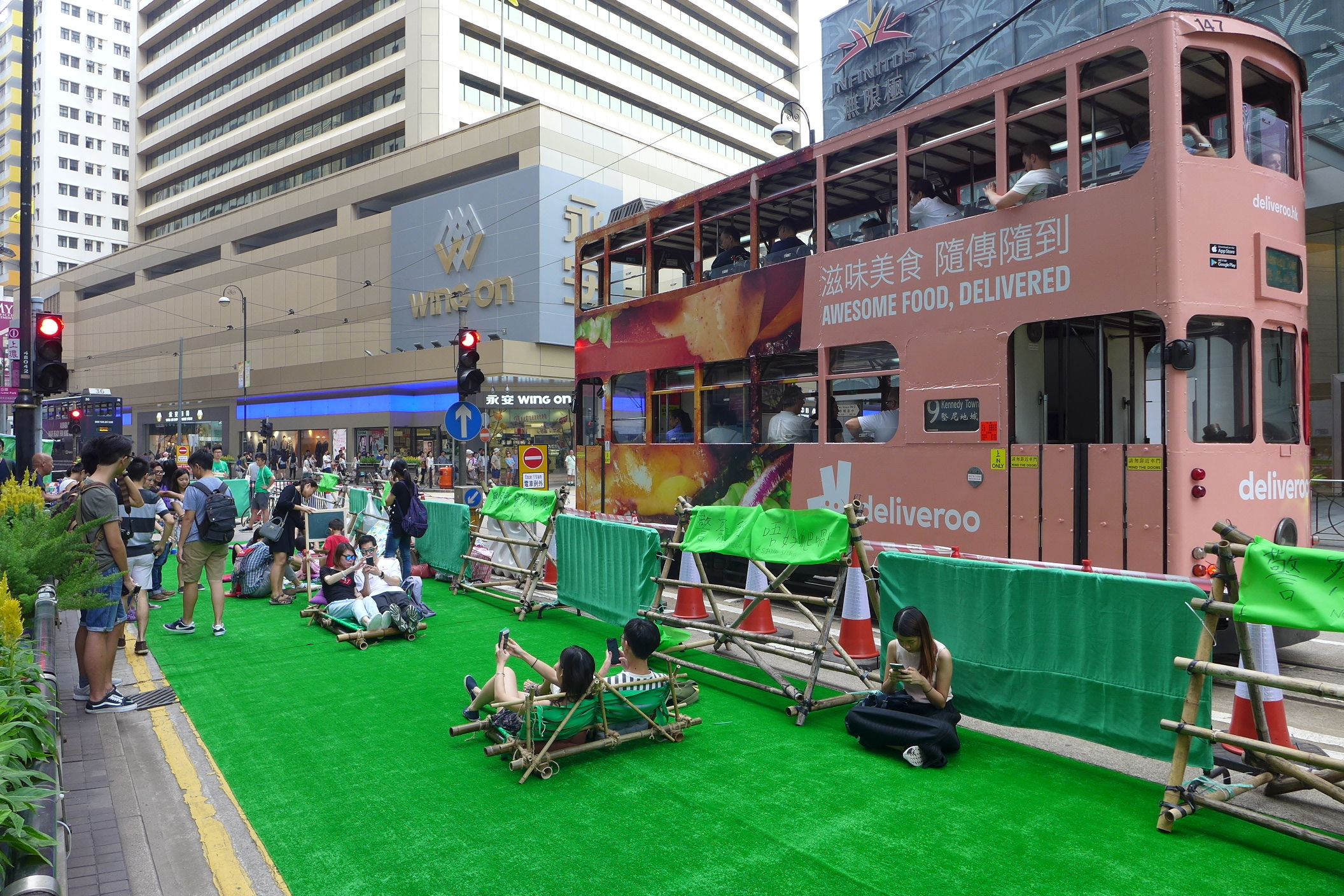
Very DVRC campaign on 25 September 2016, a temporary street closure held to raise public awareness of walkability and open space issues

Various groups have long proposed pedestrianising a section of Des Voeux Road Central.

The idea was first proposed in 2000 by the Hong Kong Institute of Planners (HKIP) as a transport improvement scheme. The scheme was deemed technically feasible but was not implemented by the government at that time. A further study was done in 2014 in collaboration with the MTR and MVA, the leading traffic engineering firm in Hong Kong, to explore how the environment can be enhanced with the transport improvement scheme. The plan involves converting a 1.4 km section of Des Voeux Road Central, between Pedder Street and the Western Market, from a thoroughfare for motorised traffic to a pedestrian zone. The tramway would be maintained in situ and the cross-streets would remain open to traffic. Bus routes would be diverted onto Connaught Road. The pedestrian zone would remain open to delivery vehicles and emergency services.

With huge support from different stakeholder groups, the Very DVRC Event was launched on 25 September 2016 to raise people's awareness of walkability and open space issues in Hong Kong. The successful one-day trial demonstrated that the closure of DVRC to most traffic can, indeed, be successfully accomplished without adverse impact on traffic and businesses.

In January 2017, Walk DVRC Ltd, an NGO, was set up to take this initiative forward.

== Public transport ==
Des Voeux Road Central is shared between motor traffic and the tram line, with tracks and reserved lanes for the trams laid in the middle of the road. A bus lane runs along the road for most of its length. Part of the MTR Island line also runs underneath Des Voeux Road.

Due to the discontinuity between Des Voeux Roads Central and West, the tram line takes a detour along Morrison Street, Connaught Road Central and Connaught Road West and then continues along Des Voeux Road West, Kennedy Town Praya and Catchick Street towards Kennedy Town.

The Central–Mid-Levels escalators link Des Voeux Road Central with Conduit Road in the Mid-Levels, passing through the narrow Cochrane and Shelley streets.

== Des Voeux Road, Hung Hom ==
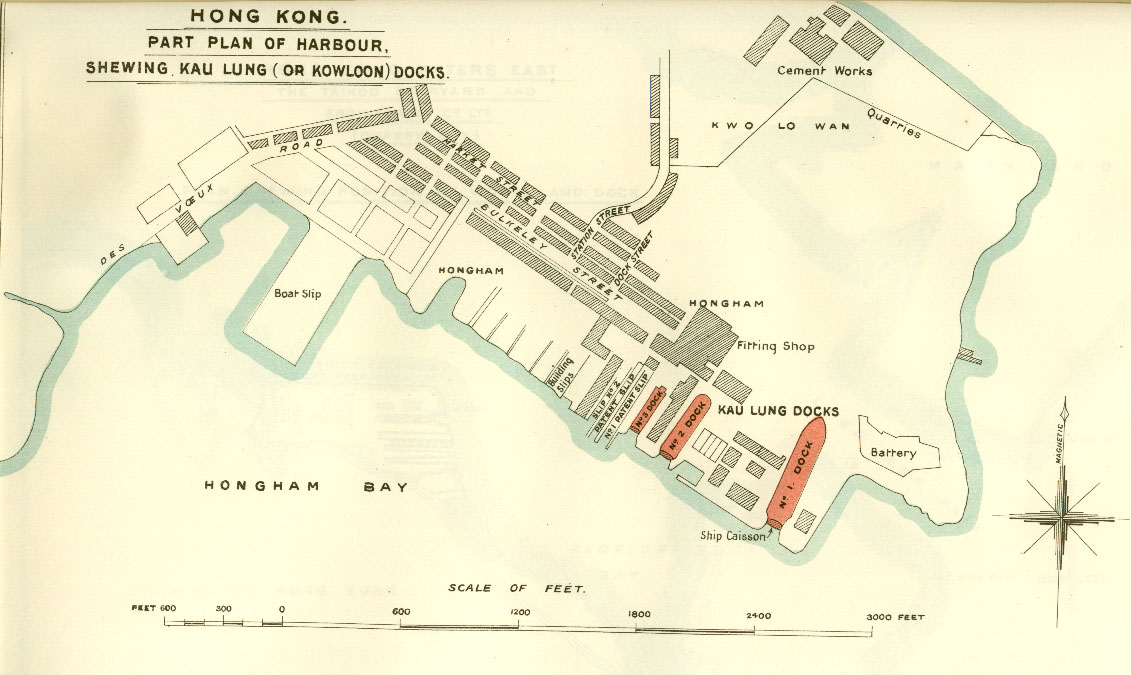
Des Voeux Road found on the left side of the map of Hung Hom c. 1900

A street called Des Voeux Road existed in Kowloon along Hung Hom Bay. The street no longer exists following extensive re-development of the area.

== See also ==
- List of streets and roads in Hong Kong
- Li Yuen Street East
