= Po Yan Street =

Street in Sheung Wan, Hong Kong

Coordinates: 22°17′06.4″N 114°08′49.5″E

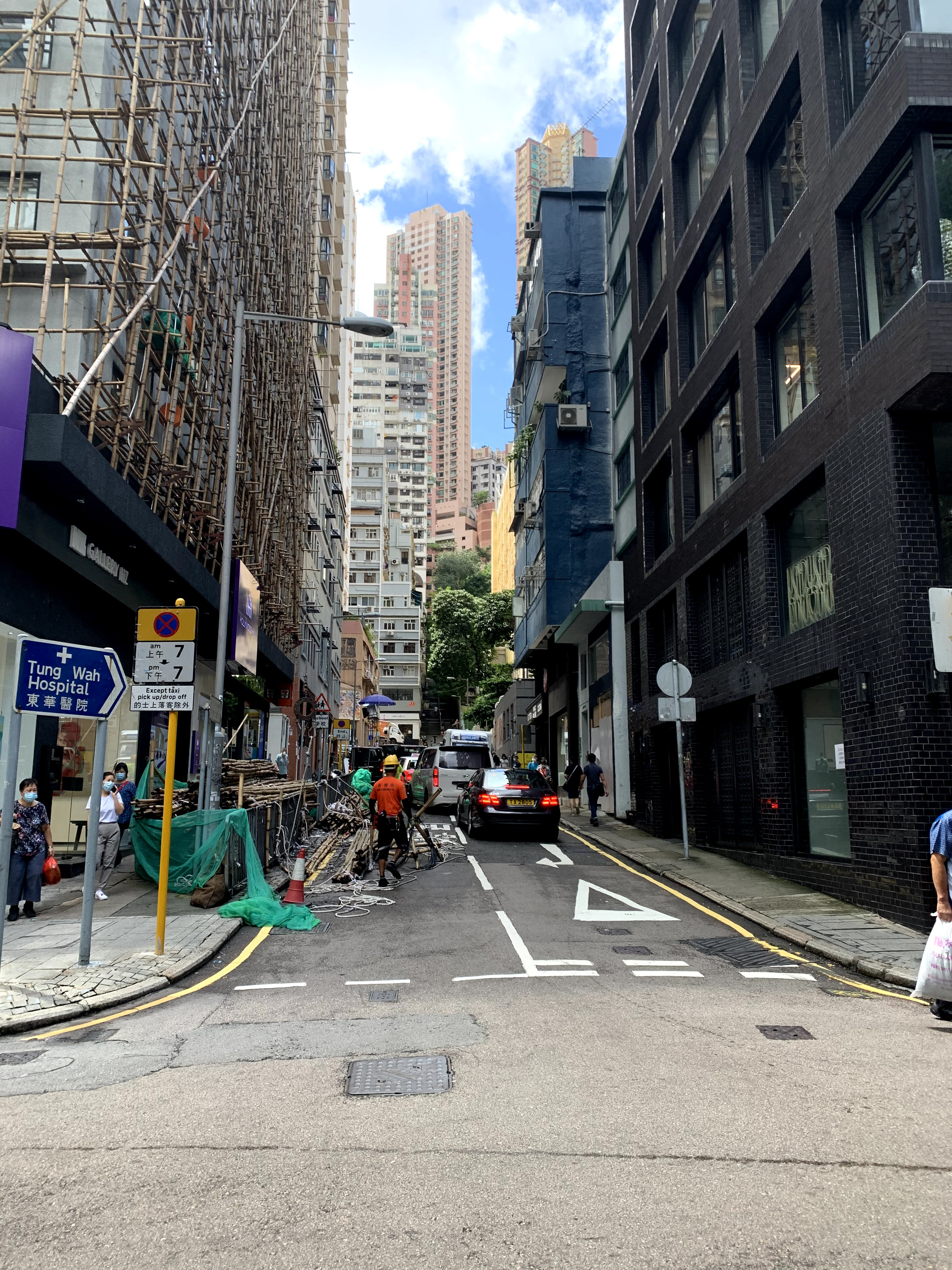
- Po Yan Street in 2020
- Interactive map of Po Yan Street
- Former names: 坟墓街; 聖士提反街 (St. Stephen Street)
- Length: 200m
- Restrictions: 50 km/h
- Location: Central and Western District, Sheung Wan
- From: Hollywood Road
- To: Hospital Road

Construction
- Inauguration: 19th century (named on 1869)

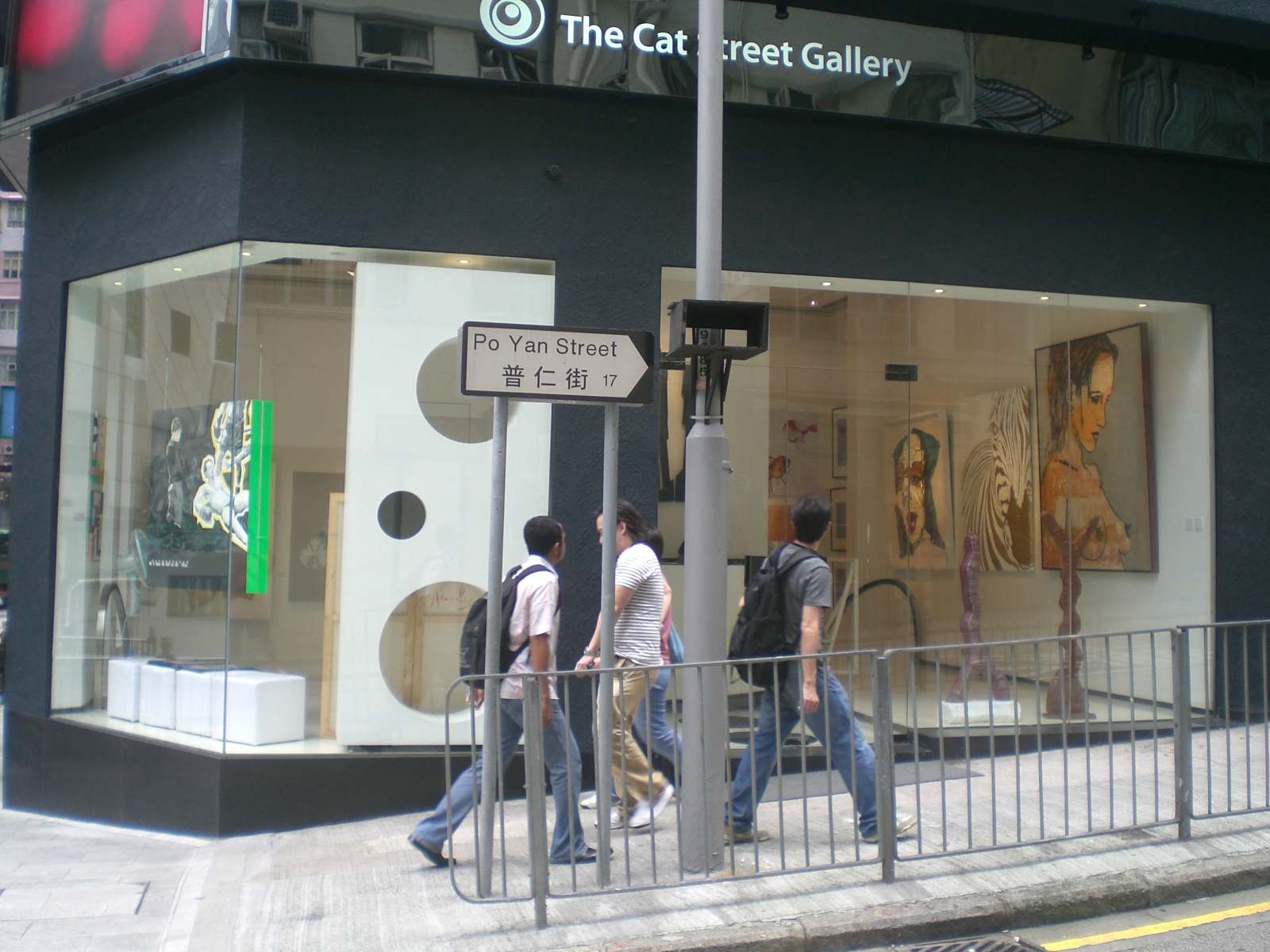
An art gallery on Po Yan Street

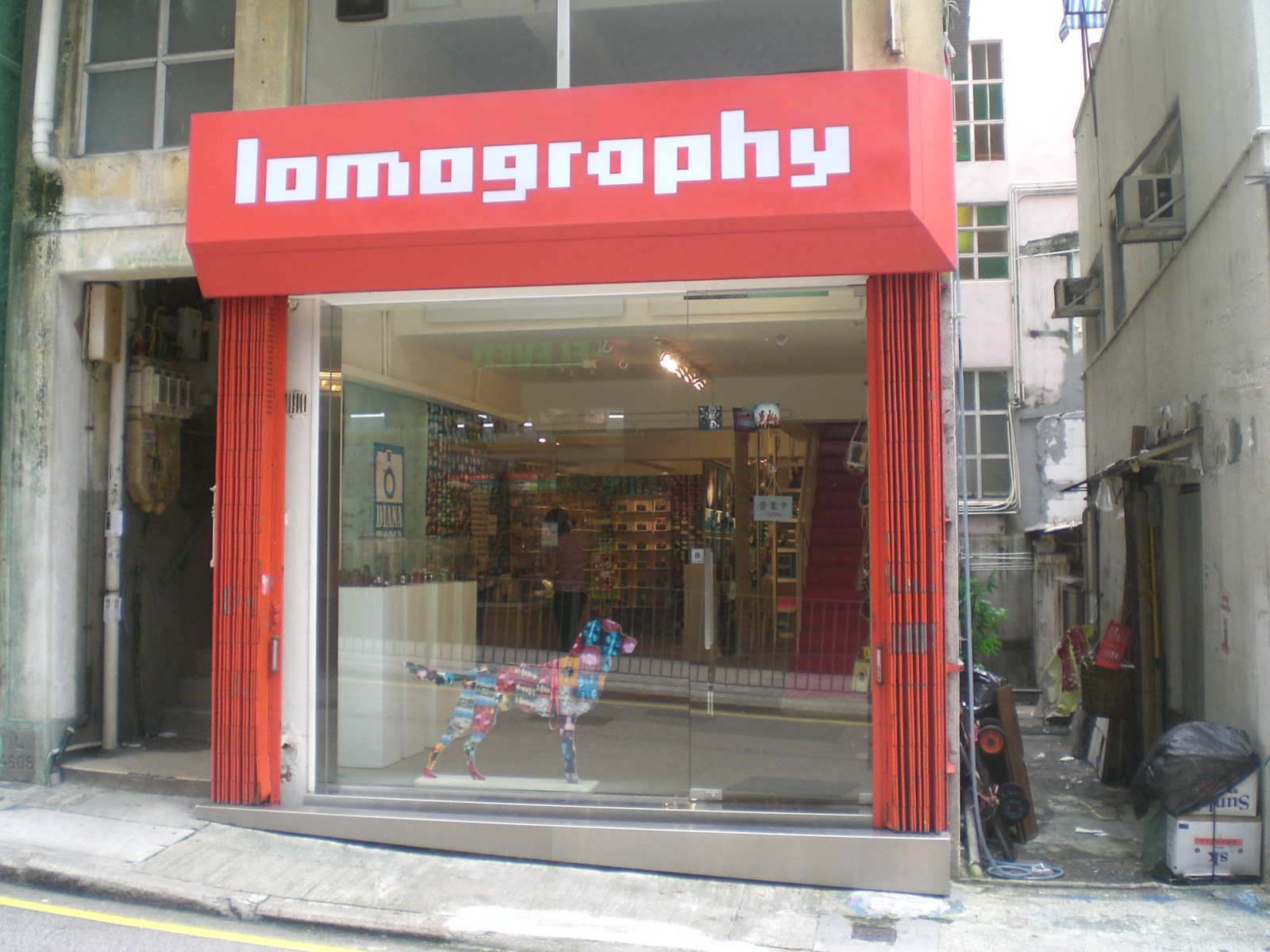
A camera shop on Po Yan Street (now closed)

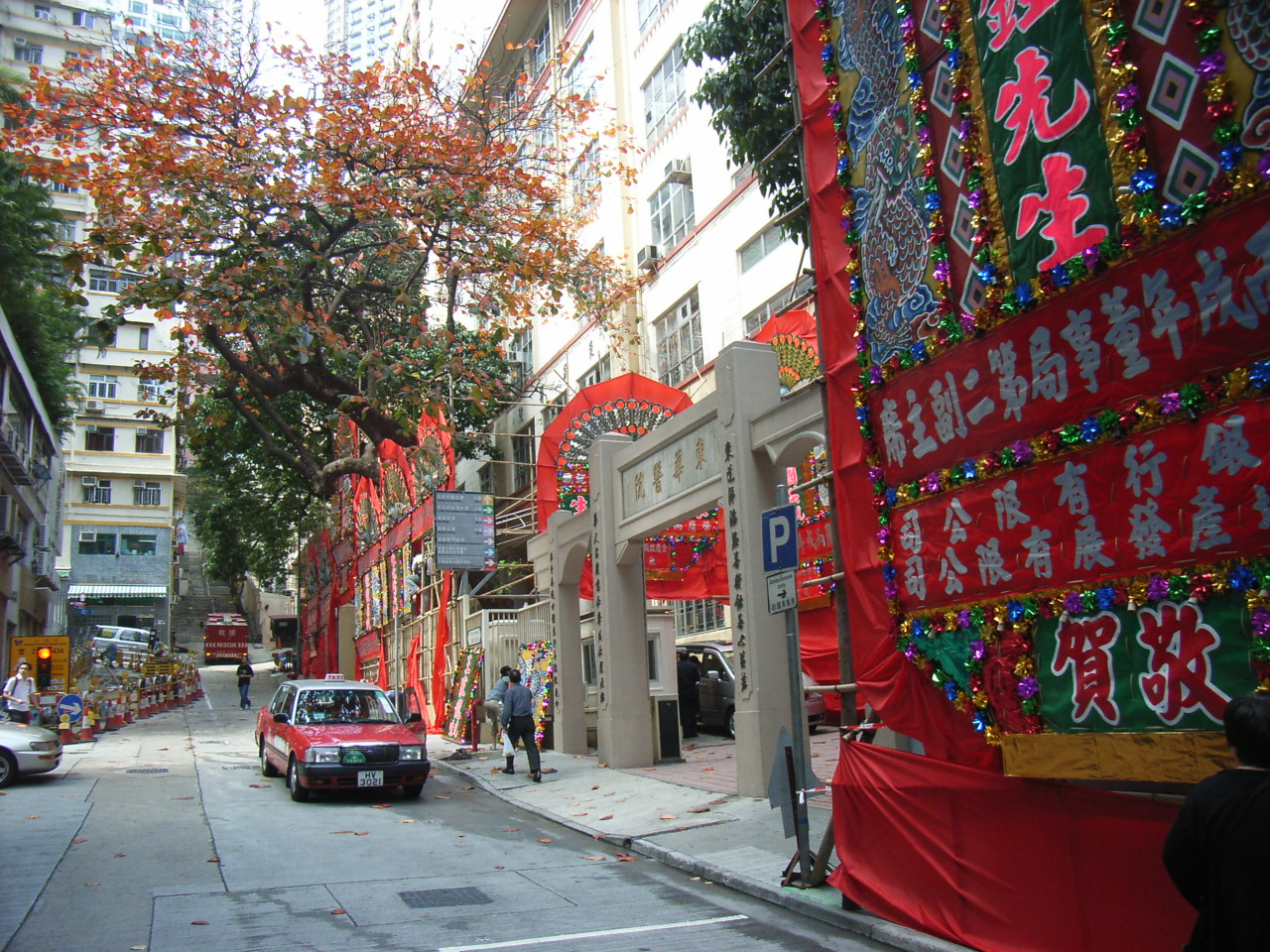
Po Yan Street outside Tung Wah Hospital (2006)

Po Yan Street (Chinese: 普仁街; Jyutping: pou2 jan4 gaai1) is a street in Sheung Wan, Hong Kong, that allows two-way traffic. It was formerly known as St. Stephen Street (坟墓街; fan4 mou6 gaai1), and was renamed in 1869. It starts at Hollywood Road and ends at Hospital Road. Po Yan Street is the birthplace of Tung Wah Hospital and the Po Leung Kuk. The Tung Wah Hospital building was completed in 1870, and the Po Leung Kuk initially used space in the hospital as its office. In addition, a theatre, a shelter for the homeless, and a refugee camp were once built on Po Yan Street. The Hong Kong government also constructed sewer facilities in the area on multiple occasions. Since the 2000s, high-end shops such as furniture stores, antique shops, and art galleries have appeared on Po Yan Street, and some service units of the Tung Wah Group of Hospitals are also located in buildings on the street.

== Etymology ==
Before 1869, Po Yan Street was named ("Grave Street"), after the cemetery for Chinese people located beside the street. It was also previously known as "St. Stephen Street".

== History ==
In the late Qing dynasty, political instability in mainland Chinese prompted many Chinese people to come to Hong Kong to make a living or to emigrate overseas via Hong Kong. Sanitary conditions at the time were very poor, epidemics were rampant, and most Chinese people did not trust Western medicine, resulting in a high death rate. The hillside beside Po Yan Street therefore became the main burial ground for Chinese people. There was also a church named "St. Stephen's Church" in the Po Yan Street area, which was completed in 1866 and demolished around 1888.

In addition, the Tong Hing Theatre (同慶戲院) was completed in 1868 on Po Yan Street. The theatre was built of brick and wood, two storeys high, and provided 200 to 300 seats across four classes. It was renamed Chung Hing Theatre in the 1890s and demolished in 1912. The Shengping Theatre was also built at the junction of Po Yan Street and Tai Ping Shan Street.

Po Yan Street is the origin of the Tung Wah Group of Hospitals and the site of the first hospital in Hong Kong founded by Chinese people. Tung Wah Hospital was established in 1870. Governor Sir Richard Graves MacDonnell granted a plot of land on Po Yan Street and sponsored HK$115,000 under the Tung Wah Hospital Ordinance, with the balance raised by the Chinese community. After its establishment, the hospital provided traditional Chinese medicine services to Chinese people. The hospital was initially a two-storey wooden building; in 1934, it was rebuilt as a six-storey structure designed by architect John Carr Clark. When the Po Leung Kuk was first established, it used the "Ping On" and "Fuk Sau" buildings at Tung Wah Hospital on Po Yan Street as its office. In 1891, the government allocated a plot on Po Yan Street for the construction of the Po Leung Kuk headquarters. By 1932, the premises on Po Yan Street were insufficient, and the organisation relocated to its current site on Leighton Road.

In the 1880s, the government made several efforts to improve sanitary conditions in the Po Yan Street area. In 1882, sanitary commissioner Osbert Chadwick, sent by the British Colonial Office, proposed building a sewer system in the Po Yan Street and Pound Lane area. The Hong Kong government had similar plans in 1884.

=== 1990s ===
In the 1930s, a shelter for the homeless was built on Po Yan Street, and after the war, Tung Wah Hospital established a refugee camp there. In 1964, a four-storey wooden building at No. 2 Po Yan Street collapsed, killing three people, including a pregnant woman; two other women were buried alive. Afterwards, the Works Bureau sealed off the area to facilitate search operations by firefighters. An editorial in the Kung Sheung Evening News identified poor building supervision and ageing structures as the main causes of the accident; another editorial suggested that government departments should immediately seal buildings with structural problems for repairs, and that residents should notify the government immediately.

=== 2000s ===
Since the 2000s, high-end shops such as furniture stores, antique shops, and art galleries have appeared on Po Yan Street. Some properties on the street house service units of the Tung Wah Group of Hospitals; for example, the first floor of Tung Fai Garden is used as the general outpatient clinic for traditional Chinese medicine at Tung Wah Hospital, while the first to fourth floors of Tower 125 (世銀花苑) accommodate the Hui Mok Tak Yu Care and Attention Home for the Elderly operated by the Tung Wah Group of Hospitals. In addition, in 2011, Po Yan Street was included by the Hong Kong Museum of Medical Sciences in the Tai Ping Shan Medical Heritage Trail to help the public understand the history of medical development in Hong Kong.

Illegal parking has long been a problem in the Po Yan Street area, especially on Saturdays, Sundays, and public holidays. In 2013, the Transport Department temporarily designated Po Yan Street as a restricted zone, prohibiting all motor vehicle drivers from picking up or setting down passengers or loading/unloading goods within the zone. The Central and Western District Council raised the issue with the Hong Kong Police Force in 2018. The Police Force stated that officers from the Central District would conduct irregular traffic control and enforcement actions in the area.

== Alignment ==
The alignment of Po Yan Street has changed several times. In 1887, it started at Gap Street (now incorporated into Hollywood Road). In 1906, it started at No. 222 Hollywood Road and ended at Rutter Street. In 1979, the section of Po Yan Street between New Street and Hollywood Road was converted to two-way traffic. Currently, Po Yan Street starts at Hollywood Road and ends at Hospital Road, and intersects with New Street, Po Hing Fong, Po Yee Street, and others. Hospital Road and Po Yan Street are connected by a staircase that passes staff quarters and a mortuary; nearby residents also use it.

== Nearby ==
- Hollywood Road
- Kwong Fook Tsz
- Blake Garden, Hong Kong
- Hollywood Road Park
- Tai Ping Shan Street
- Po Hing Fong
