= Pound Lane =

Street in Sheung Wan, Hong Kong

Coordinates: 22.2846°N 114.1474°E

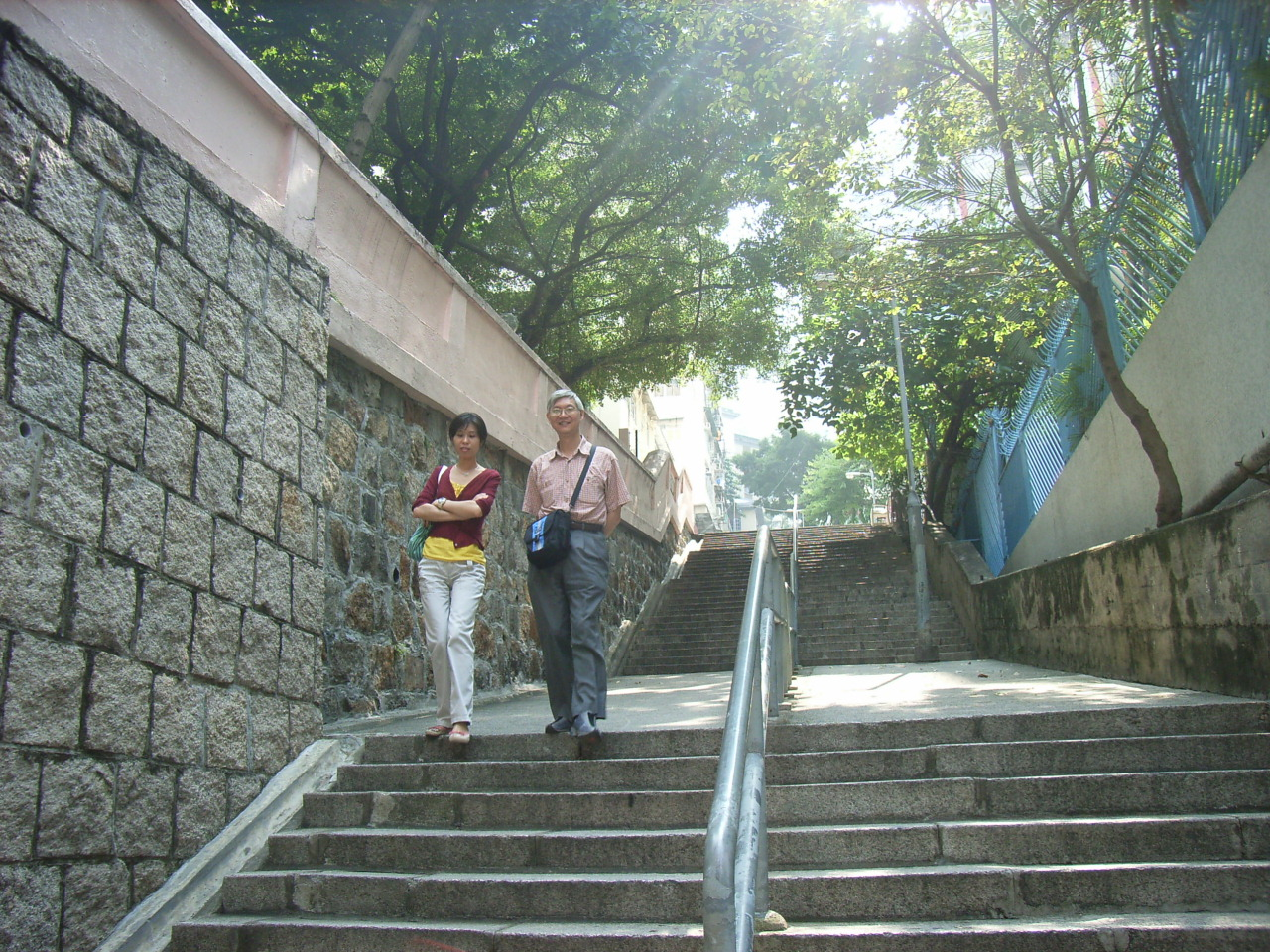
A garden stone wall on the lane

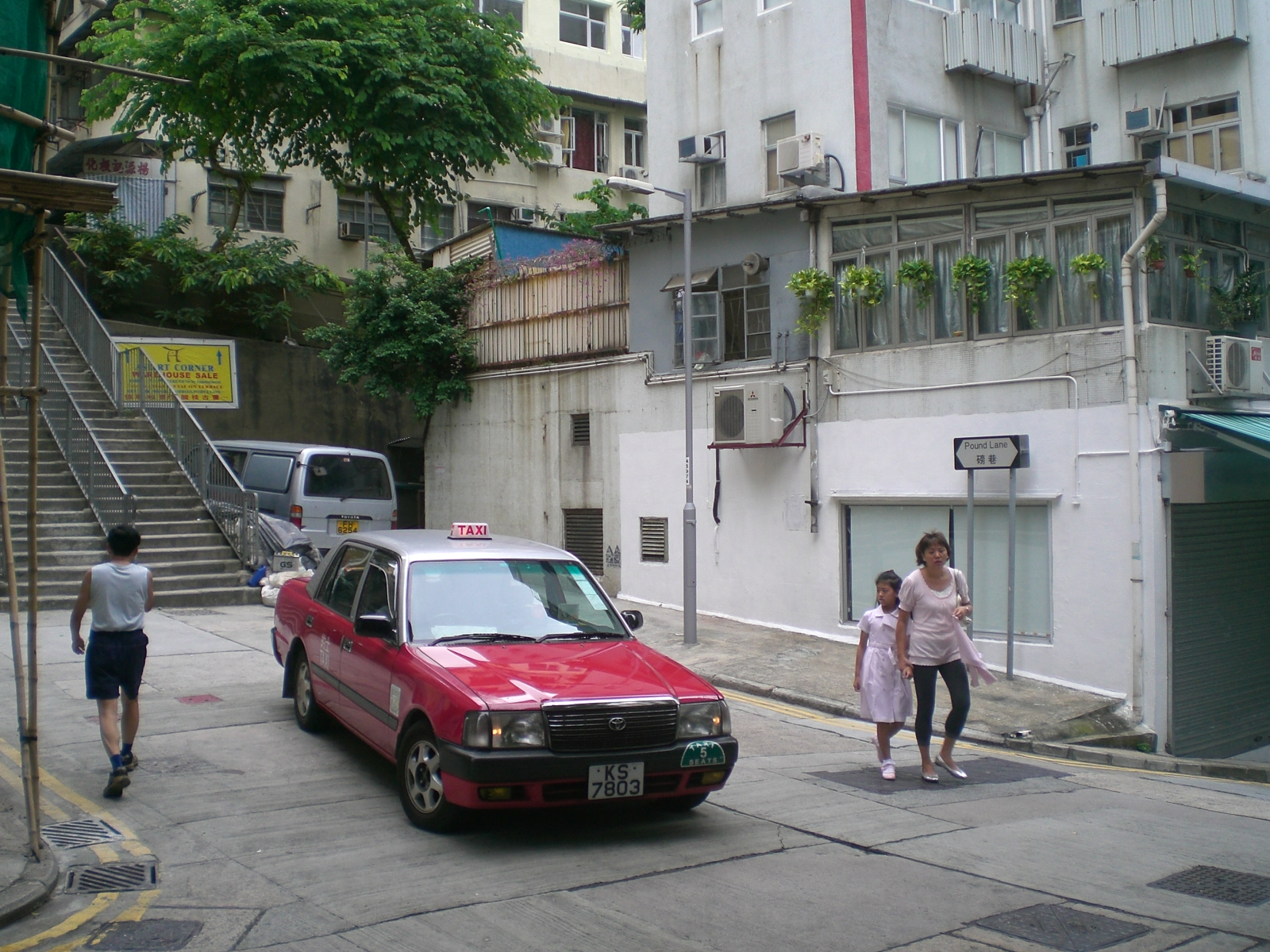
Pound Lane

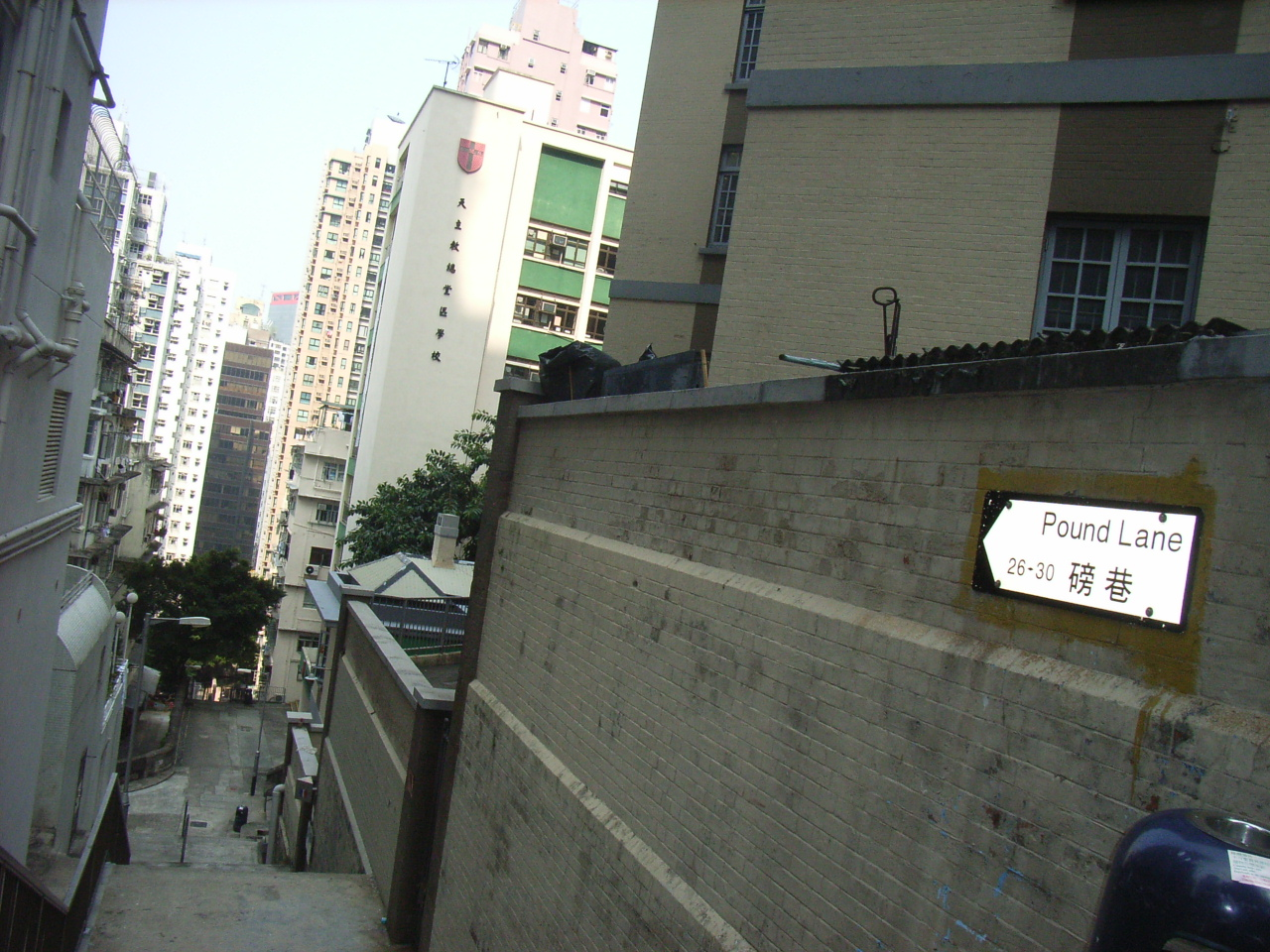
Upper section of Pound Lane.

Pound Lane (Chinese: 磅巷) is a lane in Sheung Wan on Hong Kong Island, Hong Kong.

== Location ==
Pound Lane is located between Bonham Road and Hollywood Road. The Lane runs parallel to Po Yan Street and Upper Station Street.

== Name ==
It was the site of a government pound where straying animals, like cows and sheep, were kept. The Lane was built in 1863 and appeared on the Rates List for 1870. There was one Yee Yik occupied premises in the lane and he was a cowkeeper, while another building was occupied by one Chaoupai who was listed as a goatherd.

The Chinese name mistakenly refers to the unit of measurement.

== History ==
Pound Lane was an early Chinese settlement during Hong Kong's colonial period. After the plague broke out in Hong Kong in 1894, the Hong Kong government built Hong Kong's first public toilet with shower facilities in Pound Lane in 1904 in order to improve the sanitary environment in the area.

== Nearby ==
- Tung Wah Hospital
- Tai Ping Shan Street
- Blake Garden
- Po Hing Fong
- Catholic Mission School
- Rutter Street
- Government Quarters, Sheung Wan
- Hospital Road
- Hop Yat Church

== Second mid-level escalator ==
The Central and Western District Council is considering installing a new escalator on Pound Lane, the Blake Garden area could well be on its way to becoming Hong Kong's next trendy neighbourhood. Urban planning critic John Batten, who has lived in the neighbourhood for nearly 20 years, is blunt about the prospects. "The escalator would be the death of the area," he said. Noise levels would increase, prices would go up and developers would be keen to exploit the area's 30-storey height limits. "You have to wonder who is pushing this idea behind the scenes," he said. The escalator's chief proponent has been the local branch of the Democratic Alliance for the Betterment of Hong Kong, whose community relations officer, Kathy Siu Ka-yi, can be seen on dozens of posters and banners supporting the project.

== See also ==
- List of streets and roads in Hong Kong
