= Tai Ping Shan Street =

Street in Hong Kong

Coordinates: 22.28452°N 114.14850°E

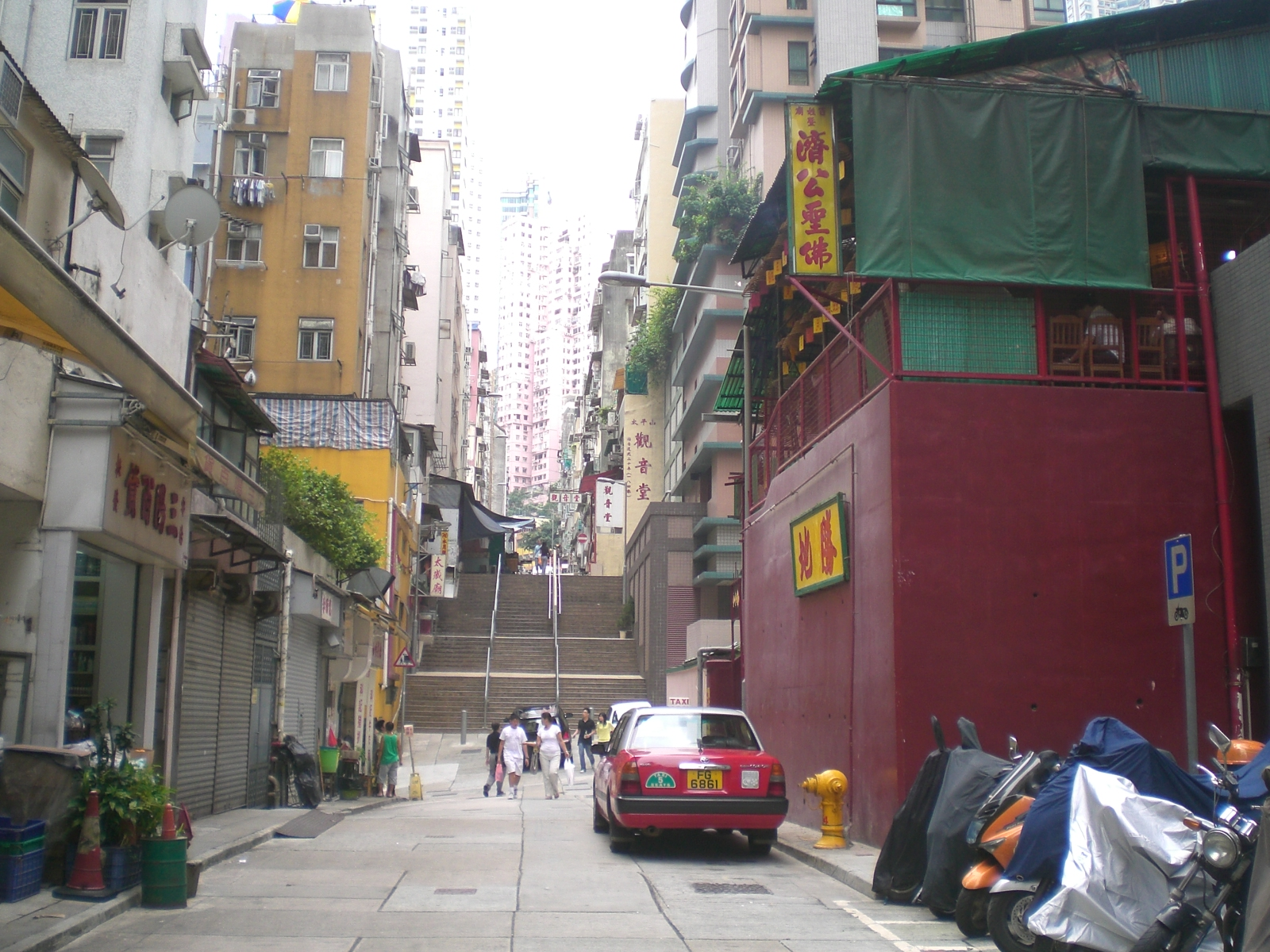
- Tai Ping Shan Street, looking southeast towards the ladder street section between Pound Lane and Upper Station Street. Kwong Fook Tsz is visible on the right
- Interactive map of Tai Ping Shan Street
- Native name: 太平山街 (Yue Chinese)
- Location: North slope of Victoria Peak
- East end: Bridges Street
- West end: Po Yan Street

Tai Ping Shan Street
- Traditional Chinese: 太平山街
Transcriptions
Yue: Cantonese
- Yale Romanization: Taai pìhng sāan gāai
- Jyutping: Taai3 ping4 saan1 gaai1

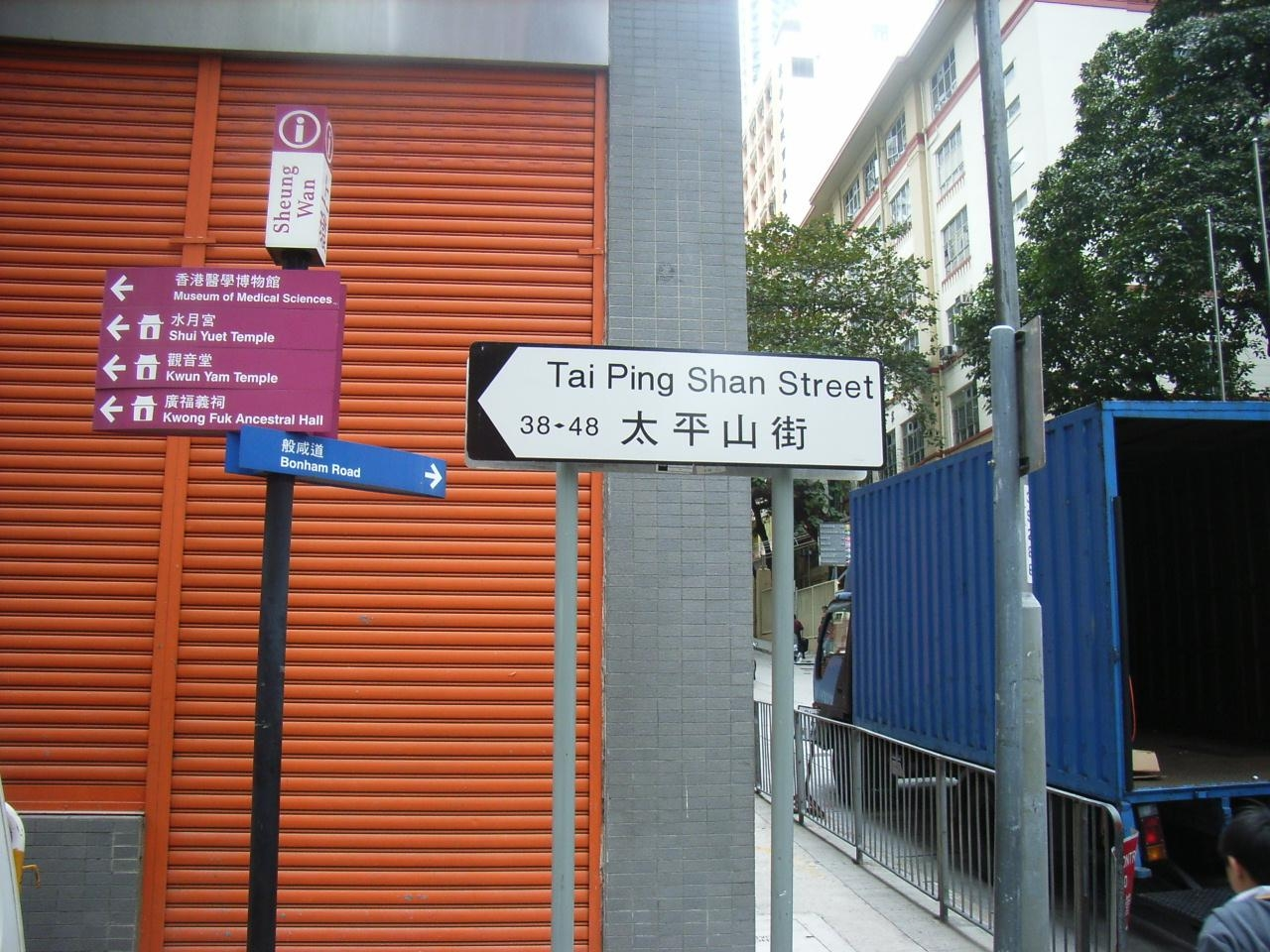
Tai Ping Shan Street, as seen from Po Yan Street near Tung Wah Hospital

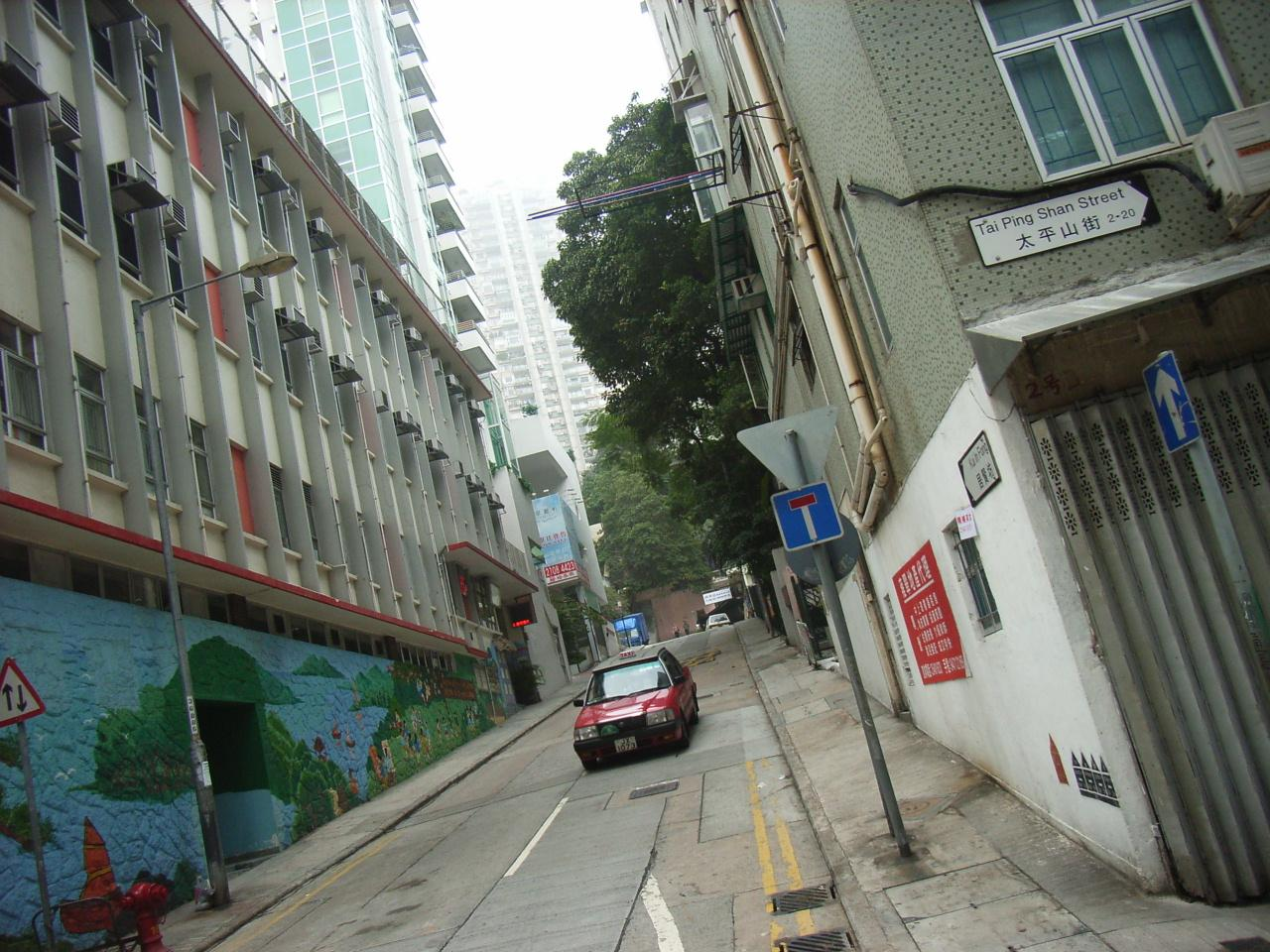
Looking up Kui In Fong. Bridges Street is out of shot to the left; Square Street is behind the camera

Tai Ping Shan Street is a street marking the early colonial history of Hong Kong. Located on the north slope of Victoria Peak in Sheung Wan, the street begins at the junction with Bridges Street, Square Street, and Kui In Fong. From there it runs in a straight line in a northwesterly direction to its terminus at the junction with Po Yan Street near Tung Wah Hospital. The street runs parallel to Hollywood Road, and briefly becomes a ladder street between Pound Lane and Upper Station Street.

== History ==
Tai Ping Shan (太平山) is an alternative name for Victoria Peak, and literally means "Peace Hill". After the cession of Hong Kong Island from Qing China to the British in the 1840s, British forces garrisoned on the Peak, resulting in the government relocating all Chinese residents in Choong Wan to the area surrounding Tai Ping Shan Street.

The Chinese writer Wang Tao observed in 1860 that the street was full of brothels: "gaudy houses, sporting brightly painted doors and windows with fancy curtains".

In May 1894, the bubonic plague, which had been ravaging China, erupted resulting in widespread deaths in the area. The Hong Kong Government soon implemented a series of measures in Sheung Wan to combat the plague, including street cleansing, demolishing residences to build Blake Garden, and establishing the Bacteriological Institute.

The street's population soared after the Eight-Nation Alliance invasion of China in 1900.

Today, Tai Ping Shan Street is characterised by its contemporary art venues, pop-up galleries, and speciality retailers.

== Features ==
Notable buildings on Tai Ping Shan Street include:

- Shui Yuet Kwun Yum Tong (水月觀音堂) (No. 7)
- Tai Shui Temple (太歲廟) (No. 9)
- Tai Ping Shan Kwun Yum Tong (太平山街觀音堂) (No. 34)
- Kwong Fook Tsz (No. 40)

== See also ==
- Description of the plague outbreak in History of Colonial Hong Kong
- Central and Western Heritage Trail
- First Opium War
- List of streets and roads in Hong Kong
