= Tung Wah Hospital =

Hospital in Sheung Wan, Hong Kong

- Hospital Authority and Tung Wah Group of Hospitals

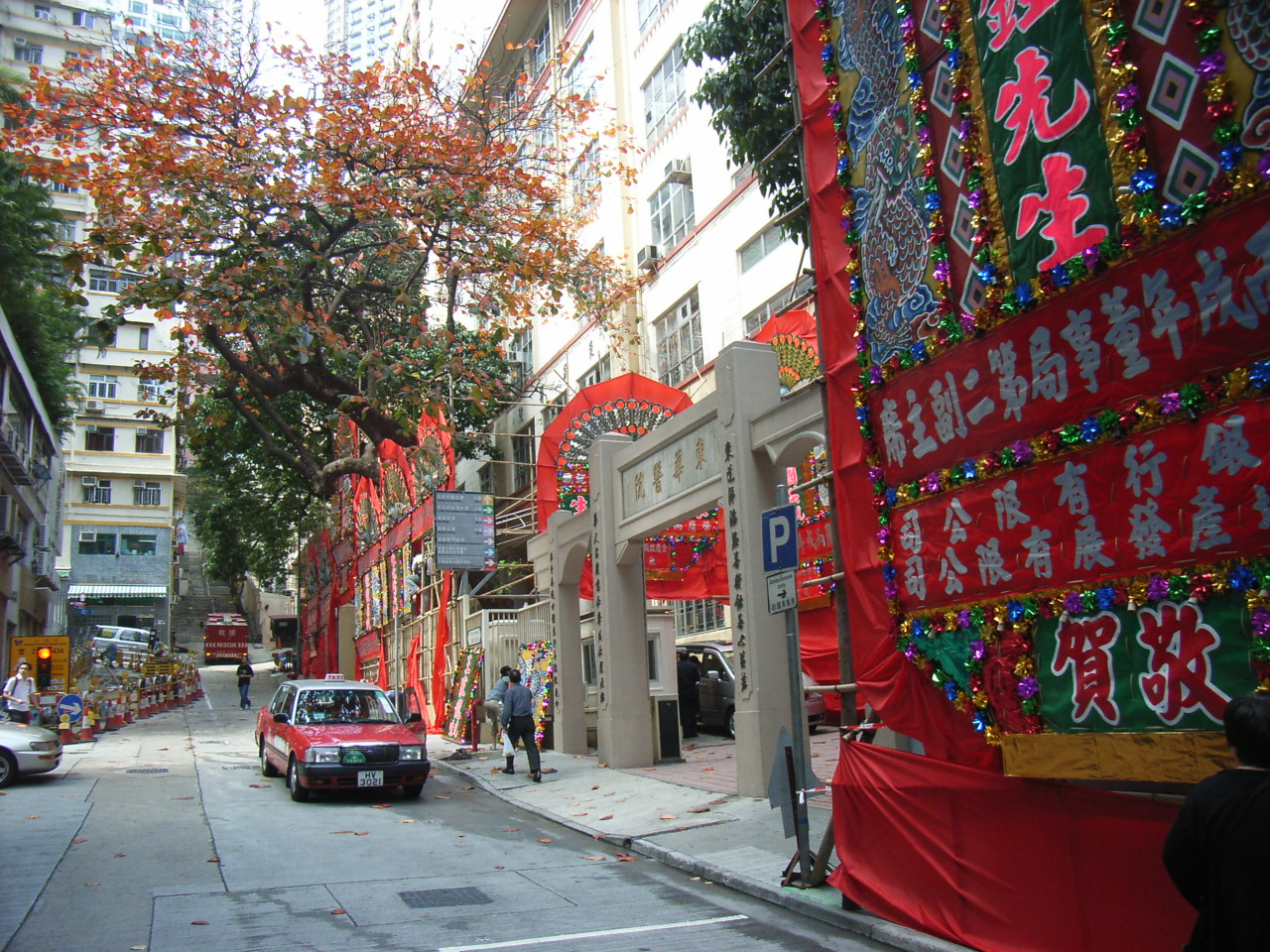
- Tung Wah Hospital

- Location within Hong Kong

Geography
- Location: 12 Po Yan Street, Sheung Wan, Hong Kong Island, Hong Kong
- Coordinates: 22°17′07″N 114°08′48″E

Organisation
- Care system: Hospital Authority
- Type: Teaching, Community
- Affiliated university: Li Ka Shing Faculty of Medicine, University of Hong Kong
- Network: Hong Kong West Cluster

Services
- Emergency department: No Accident and Emergency at Queen Mary Hospital
- Beds: 633

History
- Founded: 26 March 1870; 156 years ago

Links
- Website: www.ha.org.hk/twh/
- Lists: Hospitals in Hong Kong

Hong Kong Graded Building – Grade I
- Designated: 18 December 2009; 16 years ago
- Reference no.: 183

Tung Wah Hospital
- Traditional Chinese: 東華醫院
- Simplified Chinese: 东华医院
Transcriptions
Standard Mandarin
- Hanyu Pinyin: Dōnghuá Yīyuàn
Yue: Cantonese
- Yale Romanization: Dūng wàh yī yún
- Jyutping: Dung1 waa4 ji1 jyun6*2

Tung Wah Hospital (Chinese: 東華醫院; TWH) is a charitable hospital in Hong Kong under the Tung Wah Group of Hospitals. Located above Possession Point at 12 Po Yan Street in Sheung Wan, it is the first hospital established in colonial Hong Kong for the general public in the 1870s.

== History ==
The hospital was declared for construction on 26 March 1870 under the "Tung Wah Hospital Incorporation Ordinance". The push for the facility's construction began when the British colony's registrar general saw an indiscriminate mix of the dead and dying huddled together in the nearby Kwong Fook I-tsz, a small temple built at Tai Ping Shan Street. The large number of deaths were in part due to the arrival of the upcoming Third Pandemic of bubonic plague from China, though it was not declared an official establishment until 1872.

The hospital was subsidized by the government at a price of HK$45,000 along with HK$15,000 in land grant. The grand opening on 14 February 1872 was considered the grandest ever witnessed in colonial Hong Kong. A lot of cultural prejudice existed at the time, with Chinese citizens not trusting western medicine and other practices such as surgery. Many of them would rather die than be admitted into a western clinic.

In 1911, the government enacted Ordinance No. 38, known as the "1911 Expansion of Tung Wah Hospital Ordinance", to help deal with the population growth of Kowloon and the New Territories along with Kwong Wah Hospital.

== Background ==
With 633 beds, including 494 for in-patients, 93 for day patients and 46 rehabilitation day places, it is the second largest general hospital in Hong Kong West Cluster. The Main Block of Tung Wah Hospital is graded as Grade I historic building. It is affiliated with the Li Ka Shing Faculty of Medicine of the University of Hong Kong.

== See also ==
- Seaman's Hospital
