= Blake Garden, Hong Kong =

Urban park in Sheung Wan, Hong Kong

Coordinates: 22.28428°N 114.14810°E

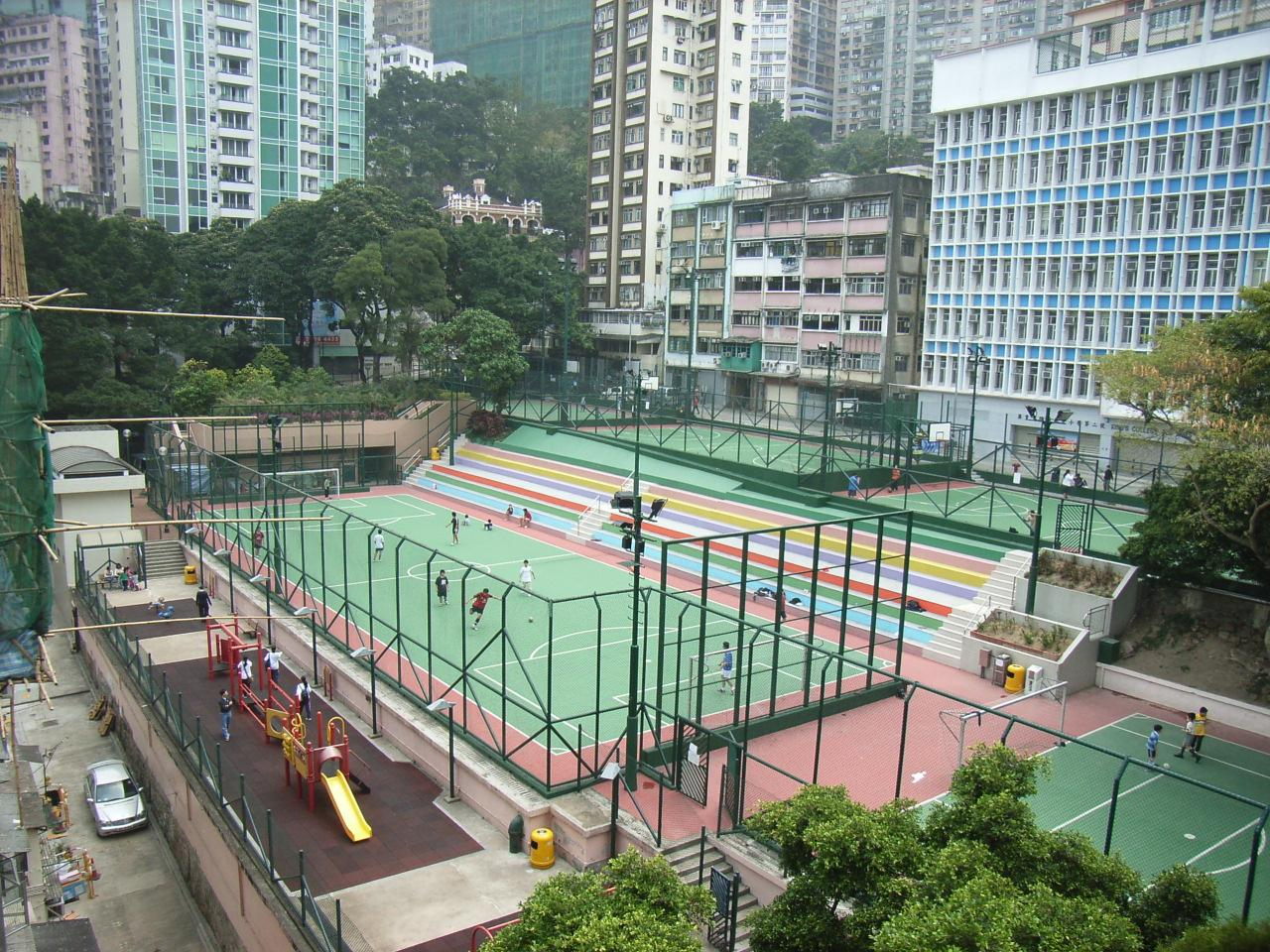
Blake Garden, Sheung Wan

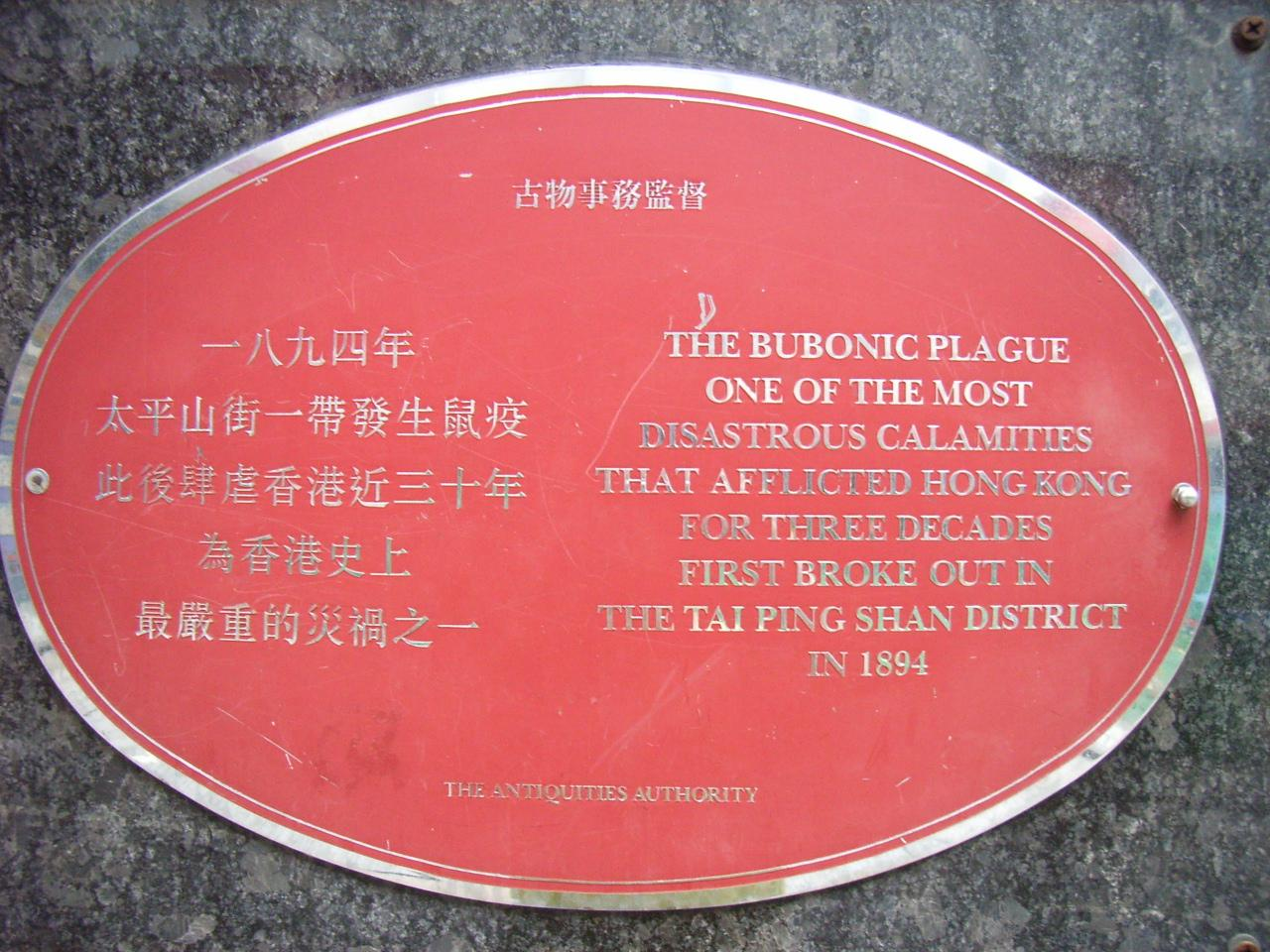
Commemorative Plaque for the Outbreak of the Bubonic Plague in 1894

Blake Garden (Chinese: 卜公花園), also known as Blake Gardens, is a small urban park in Sheung Wan on Hong Kong Island, near Man Mo Temple. The park is named after Sir Henry Arthur Blake, a former British governor of Hong Kong. It includes hard-surface playing areas for football, basketball and badminton/volleyball.

== History ==
In 1894, the bubonic plague broke out in Hong Kong, centred on Tai Ping Shan Street, which was densely populated with deplorable sanitary conditions. In response, the buildings in the area were bought and demolished by the Government. The worst affected area was redeveloped. Blake Gardens and the Old Pathological Institute (now Hong Kong Museum of Medical Sciences) were built here.

The garden has a plaque commemorating the outbreak of the bubonic plague in 1894.

== See also ==
- List of urban public parks and gardens in Hong Kong
