= Kwong Fook Tsz =

Coordinates: 22.285157°N 114.147675°E

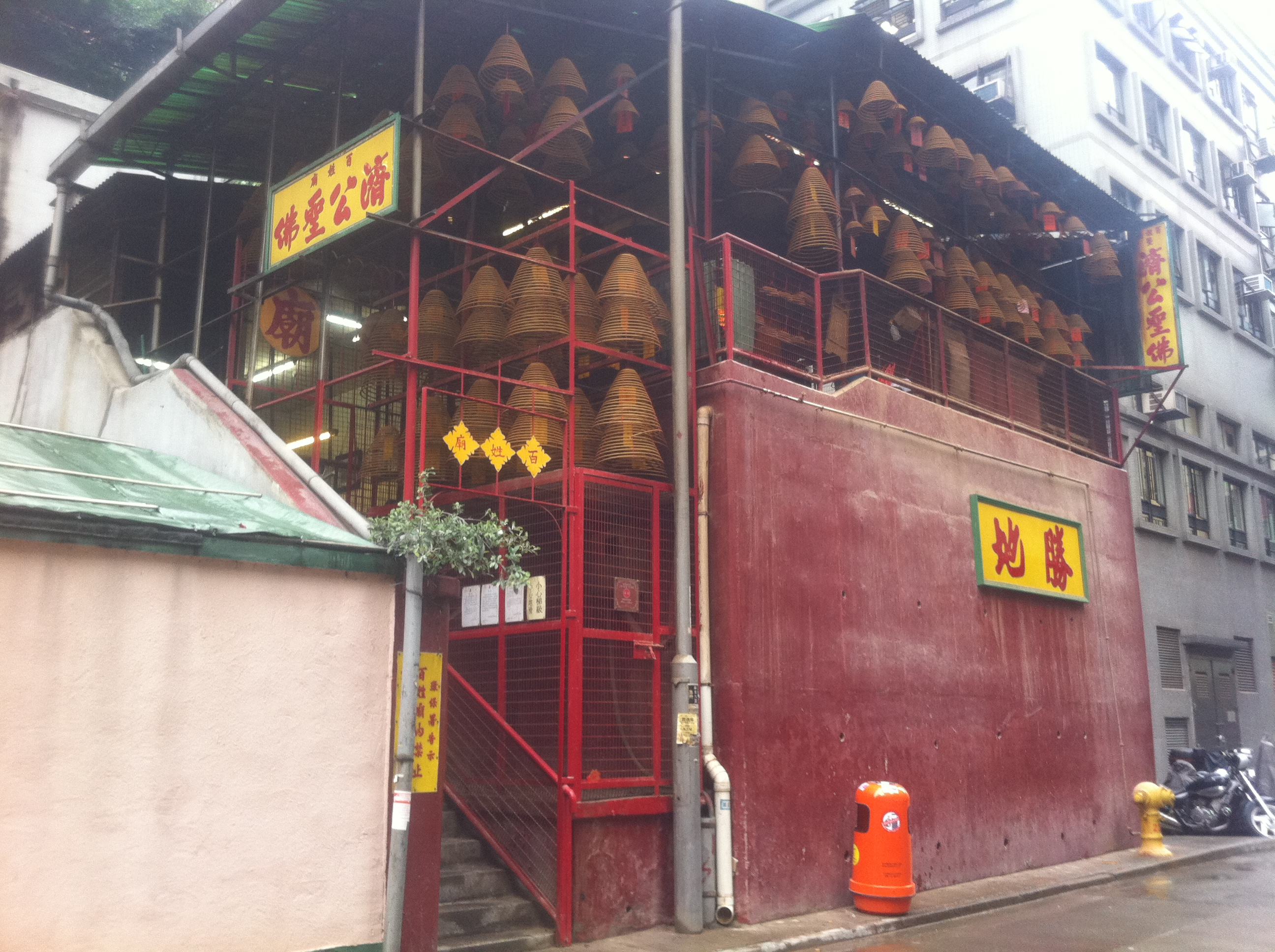
Kwong Fook Tsz along Tai Ping Shan Street in 2012

Kwong Fook Tsz (廣福祠; 'temple of common benevolence'), originally called Kwong Fook I Tsz (廣福義祠), also known as Pak Shing Temple or Bak Sing Tsz (百姓祠; 'temple for all folks') is a religious building located at No. 40 Tai Ping Shan Street, Sheung Wan, Hong Kong. It is managed by the Tung Wah Group of Hospitals.

Its deities for worship have been Kshitigarbha Buddha (地藏王), the guardian of the earth who can alleviate people's sufferings, and Tsai Kung (濟公; Ji Gong), commonly known as the Buddha for all requests.
