= Hong Kong Museum of Medical Sciences =

Museum in Hong Kong

- 香港醫學博物館
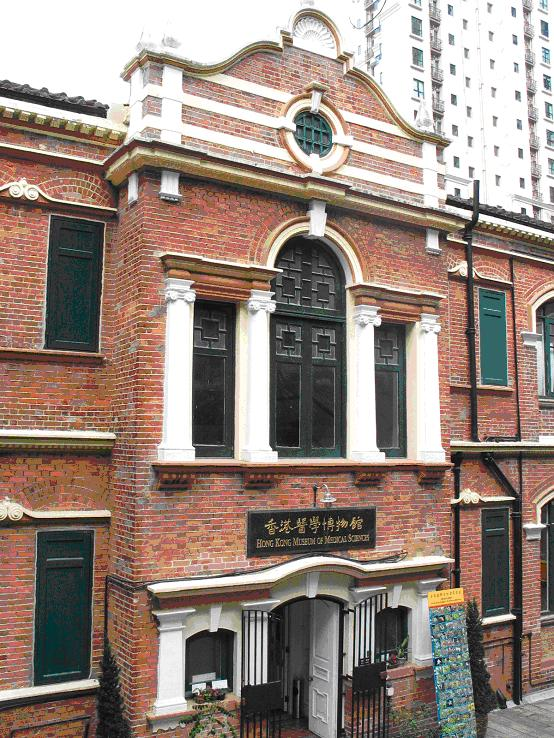
- Hong Kong Museum of Medical Sciences
- Former name: Bacteriological Institute (1906-1940s); Pathological Institute (1940s-1960); Old Pathological Institute (1960-1996)
- Established: 16 March 1996; 30 years ago
- Location: 2 Caine Lane, Sheung Wan, Hong Kong
- Coordinates: 22.283443°N 114.148606°E
- Type: Heritage
- Chairperson: Dr Edwin CL YU
- Architect: Leigh & Orange
- Owner: Hong Kong Museum of Medical Sciences Society
- Website: www.hkmms.org.hk/en

Hong Kong Museum of Medical Sciences
- Traditional Chinese: 香港醫學博物館
- Simplified Chinese: 香港医学博物馆
Transcriptions
Standard Mandarin
- Hanyu Pinyin: Xiānggǎng Yīxué Bówùguǎn
Yue: Cantonese
- Yale Romanization: Hēung góng yī hohk bok maht gún
- Jyutping: Hoeng^{1} gong^{2} ji^{1} hok^{6} bok^{3} mat^{6} gun^{2}

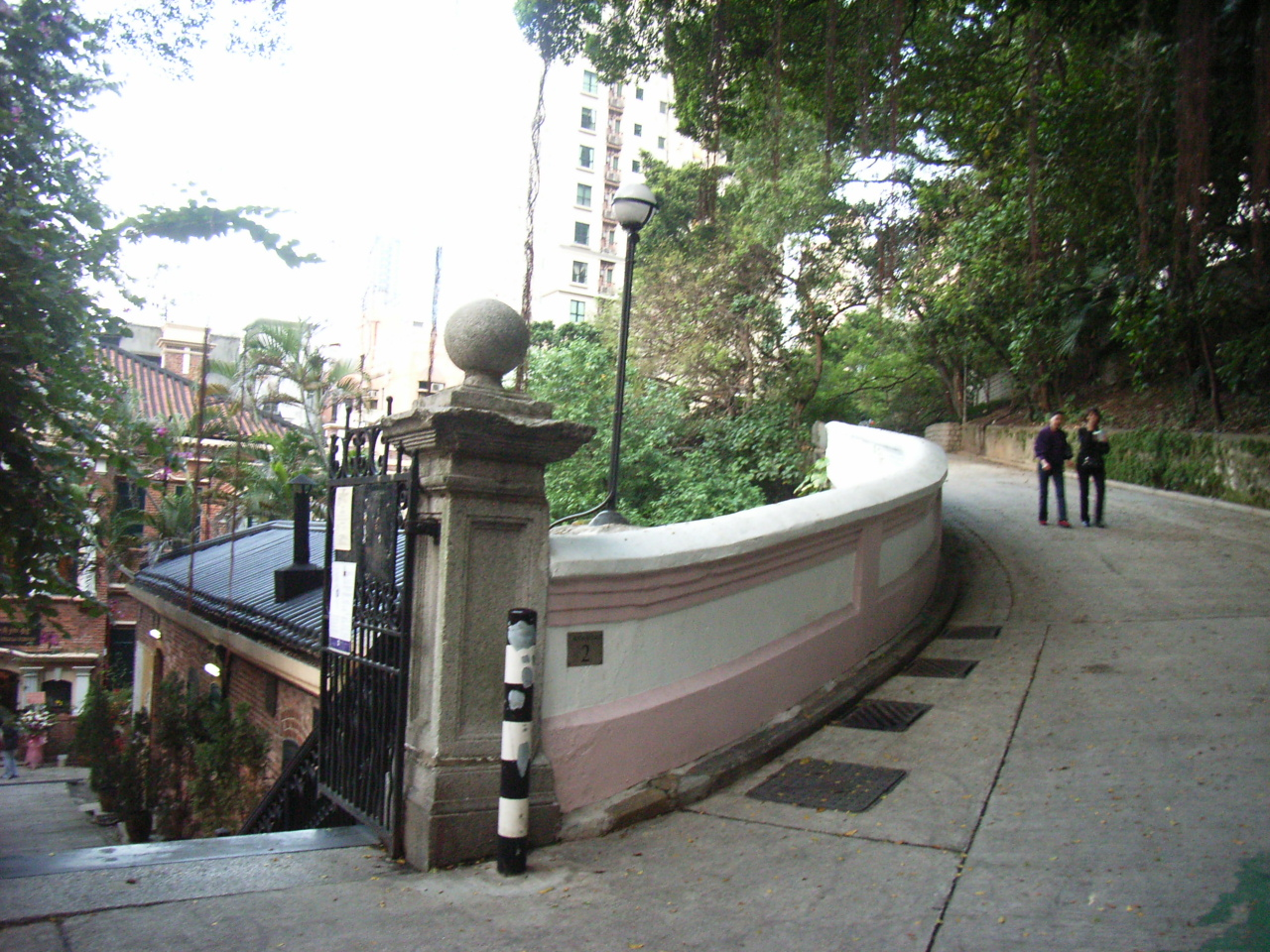
An entrance of the museum at Caine Lane

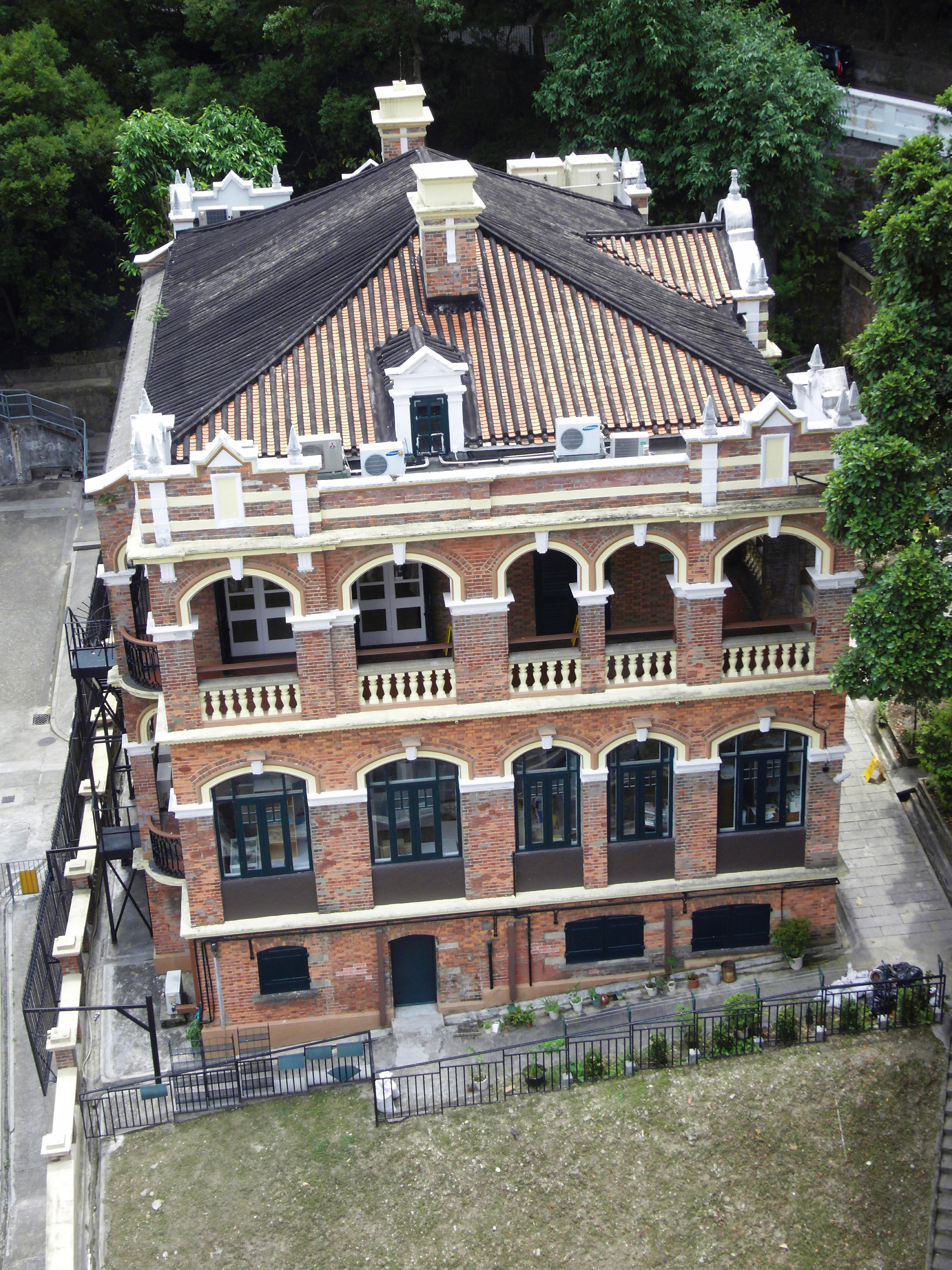
View of the building

The Hong Kong Museum of Medical Sciences was established in 1996. It is in a renovated three-story Edwardian-style building, at 2 Caine Lane at the Sheung Wan, Hong Kong Island, Hong Kong. It is also referred to as Old Pathological Institute.

The aim of the museum is to promote the collection and preservation of materials of historical interest relating to the development of the medical industry in Hong Kong. On occasion, exhibitions are held by the museum to present basic and advanced medical information and news. One of its major goals is to help raise public interest in the medical history of Hong Kong and teach them more about health and diseases.

== History ==
The building that would later become Hong Kong Museum of Medical Sciences was built in 1906. It was designed as a Bacteriological Institute and renamed to Pathological Institute after World War II. The building was designed by Leigh & Orange.

Being the first laboratory of bacteriology in Hong Kong, it was constructed of red bricks and consisted of three blocks. The main block is a two-storey building with a basement. The second one was used as a dormitory and the third for keeping animals.

In 1972, the institute was relocated to Victoria Road and the building was then used as a storeroom for Pathology Service for the Health Department.

The building was declared a monument in 1990. In 1995, it was handed over to the Hong Kong Museum of Medical Sciences Society and converted to a public museum where it was opened on 16 March the following year.

== Features ==
It is a three-tier building occupying 10,000 square feet (930 m^{2}) and it consists of 11 exhibition galleries including a gallery for Tai Ping Shan View, a game room, a library and the Gordon King Lecture Theatre. There is an entry fee charged at the museum of 20 Hong Kong Dollars per person.

The galleries include:

- Lui Hac Minh Gallery
- Hong Kong Tuberculosis, Chest and Heart Diseases Association Gallery
- Hong Kong College of Radiologists

== Goal ==
The aim of the museum is to exhibit and educate the public about Hong Kong's medical history and to preserve historical medical materials relating to the local development of medicine.

Publications and leaflets are distributed to the public occasionally to help arouse the interest of the public in the medical history of Hong Kong and increase their knowledge and understanding of health and diseases.

== Transportation ==
The museum is in walking distance southwest from Sheung Wan station of MTR.

Visitors can take Citybus or NWFB bus services 12, 12M, 13, 23, 23B, 40, 40M or 103 and alight at the bus stop named "Seymour Road" on Caine Road.

== Gallery ==
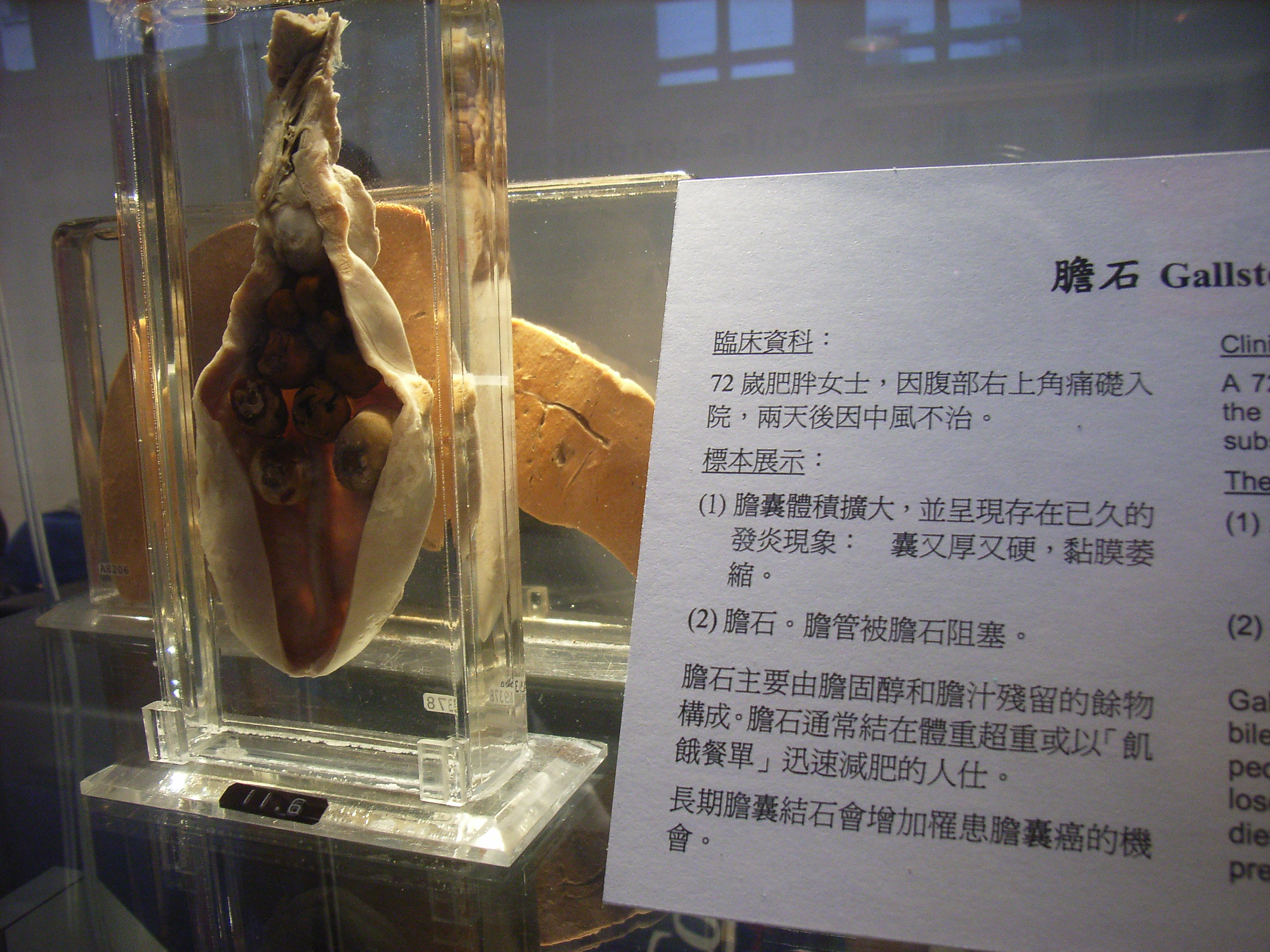
A specimen in the museum

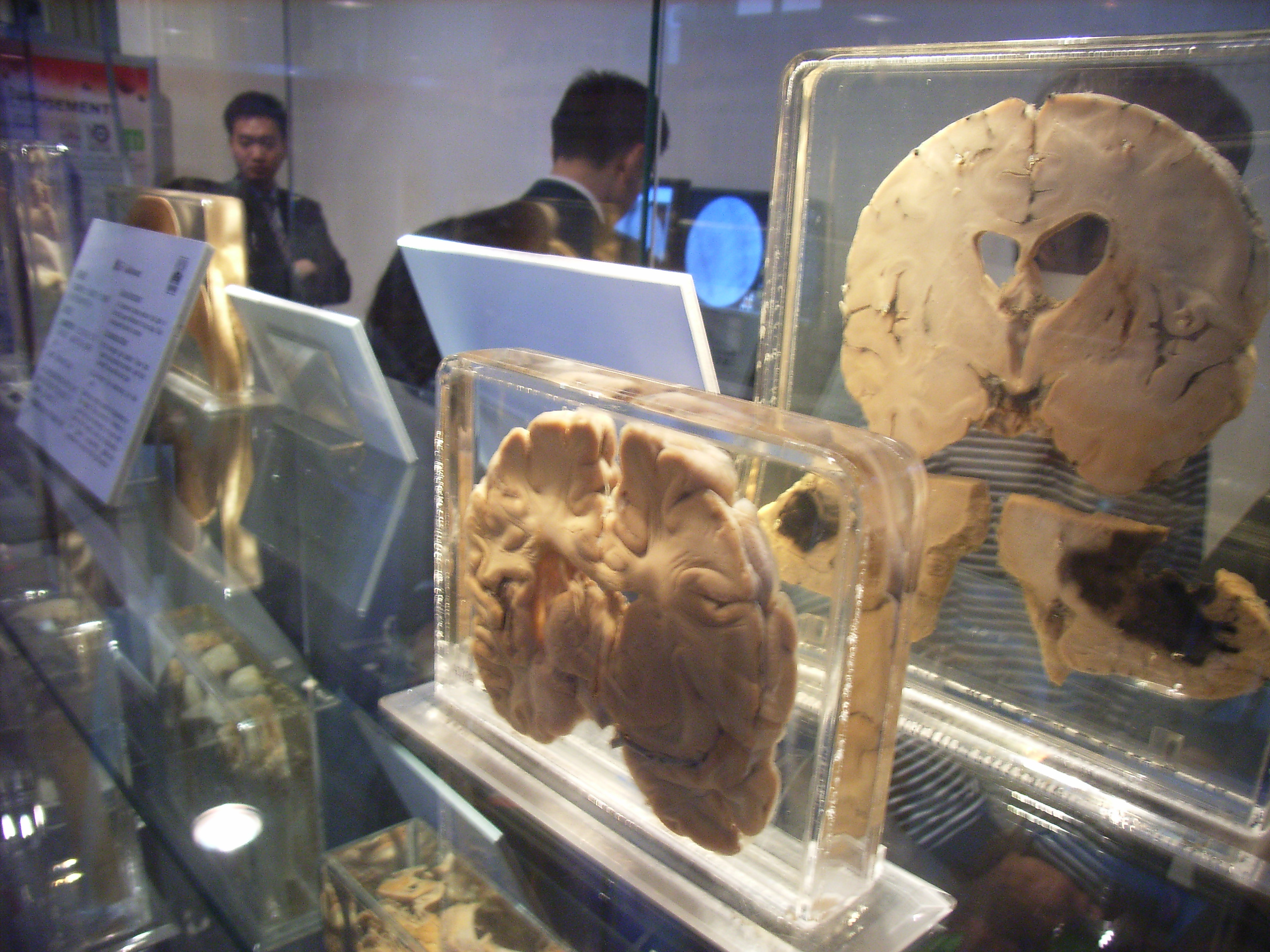
Another specimen in the museum

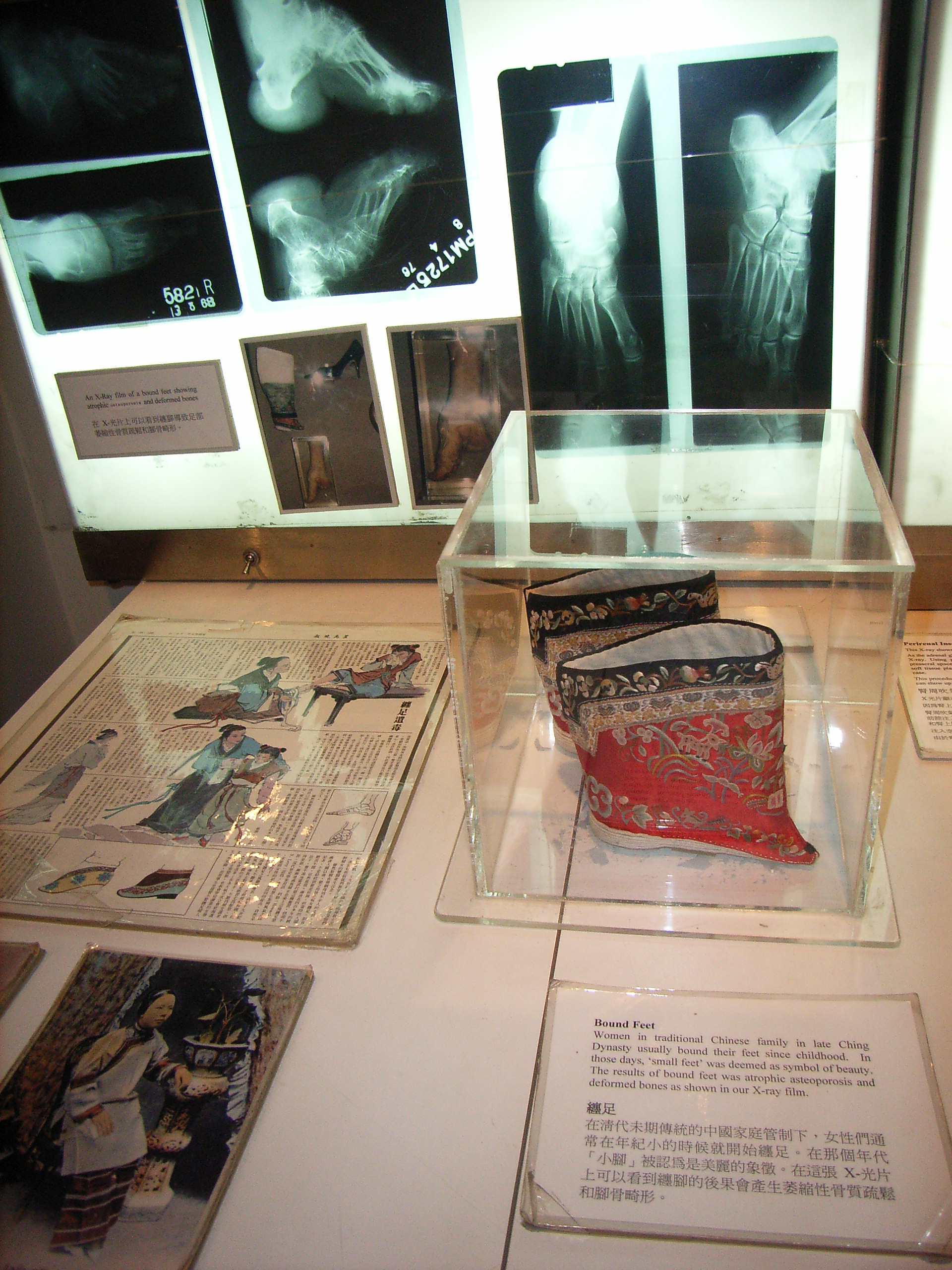
An exhibit in the museum: Bound Feet

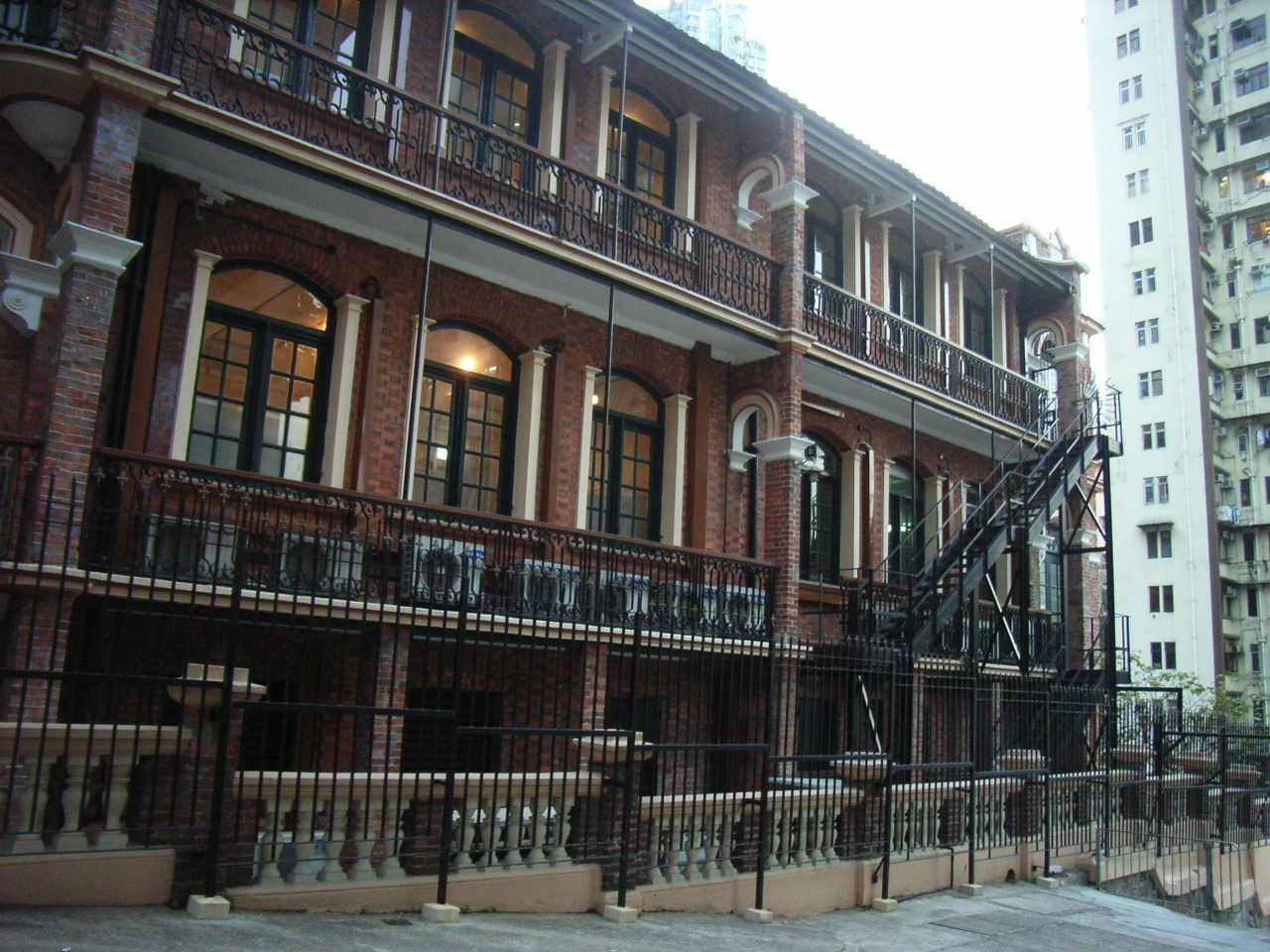
An exit of the museum

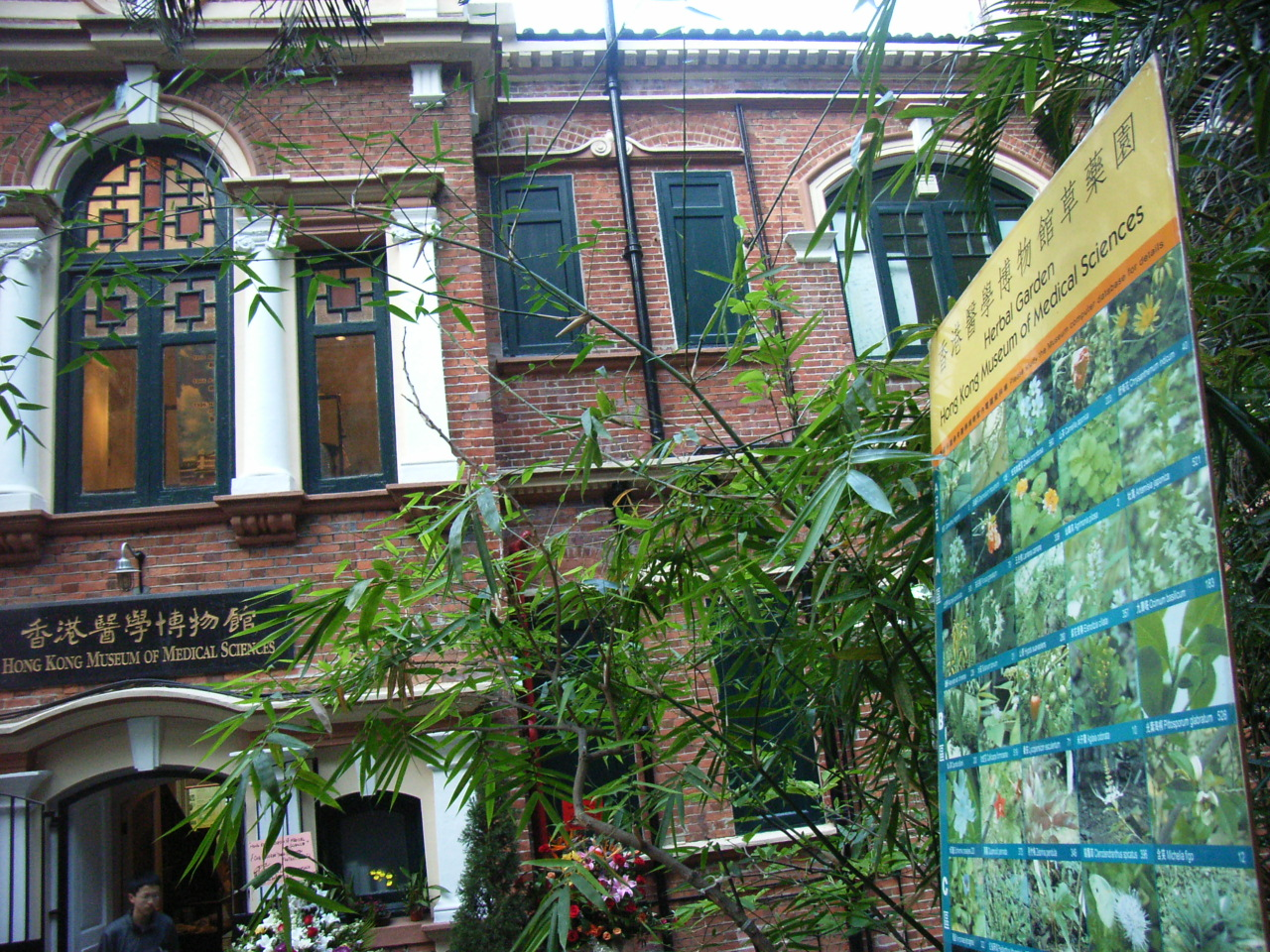
The museum and its herbal garden

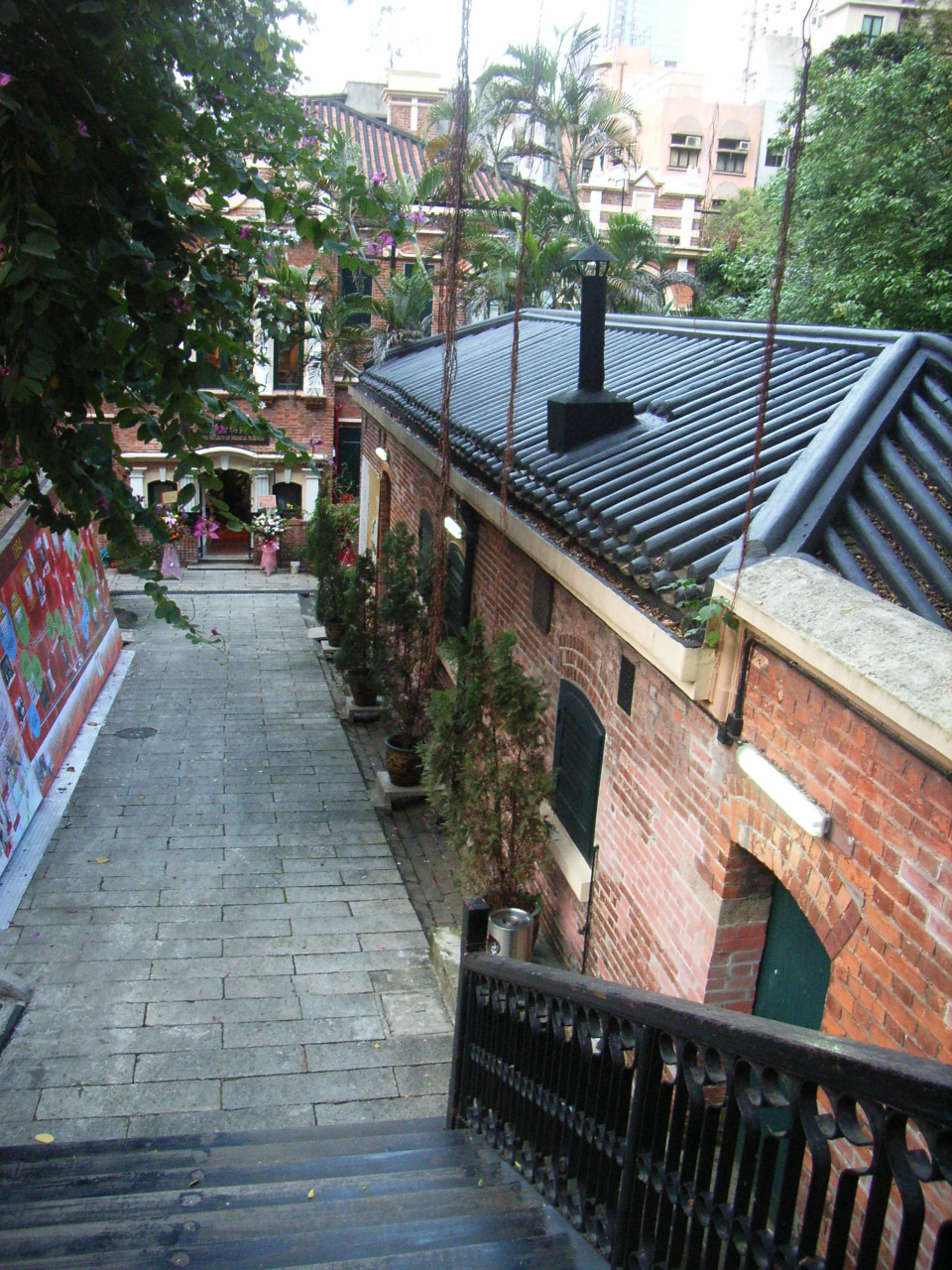
An entrance of the museum

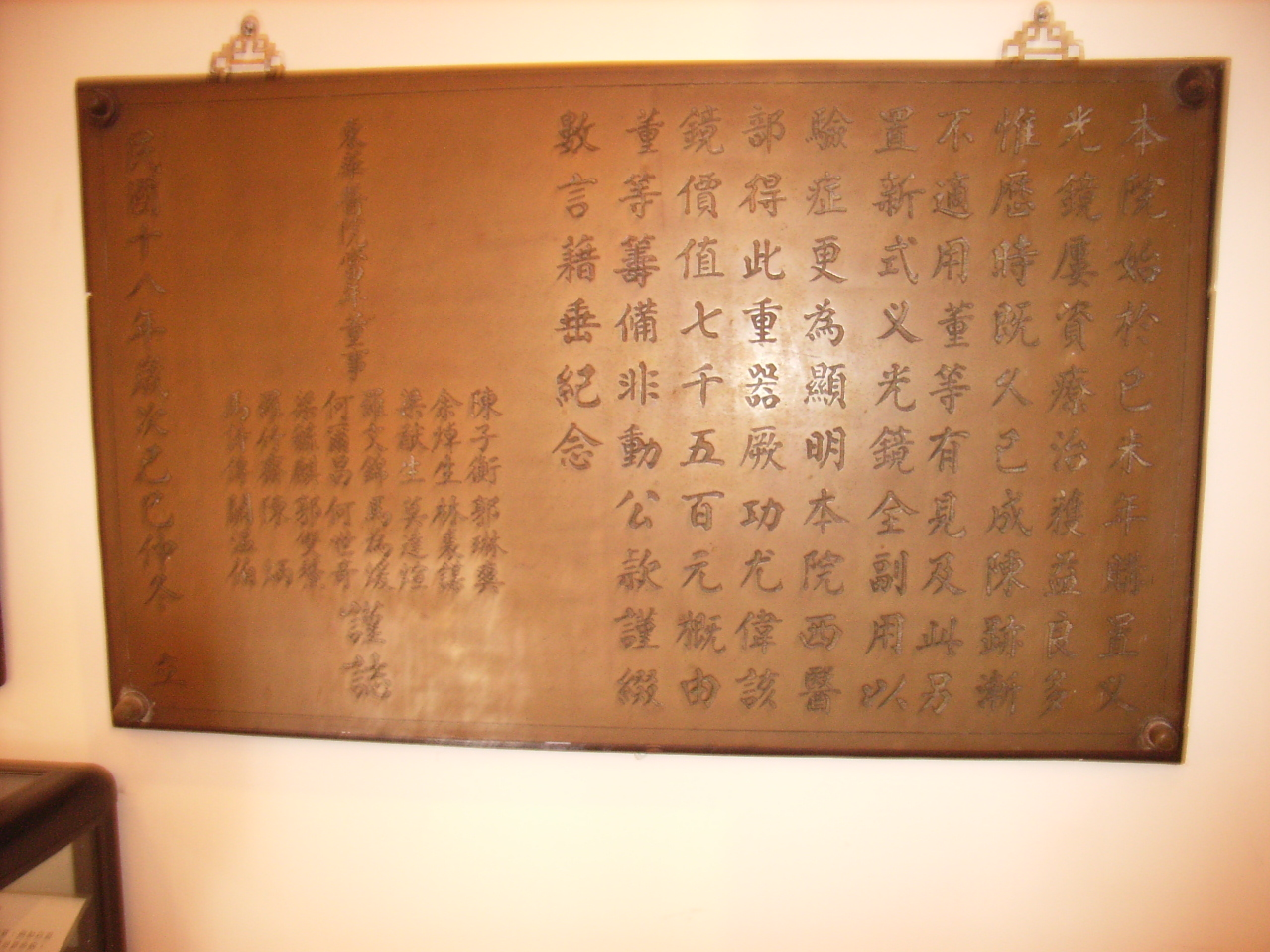
Tung Wah Group of Hospitals' Gallery

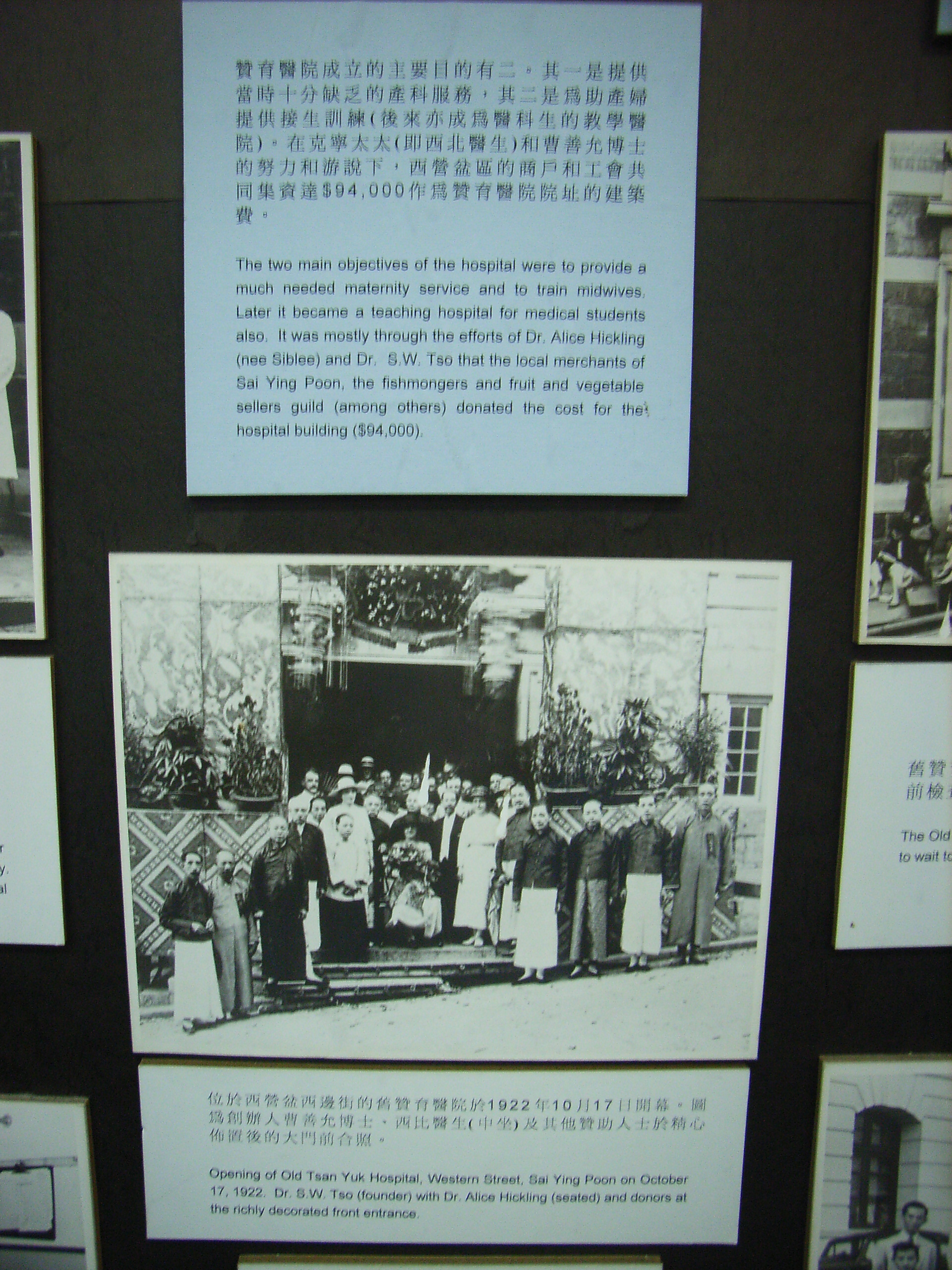
The exhibits explain the history of Tsun Yuk Hospital

== See also ==
- List of museums in Hong Kong
- Health in Hong Kong
