= Wing Sing Street =

Street in Hong Kong

Coordinates: 22.28571°N 114.1528°E

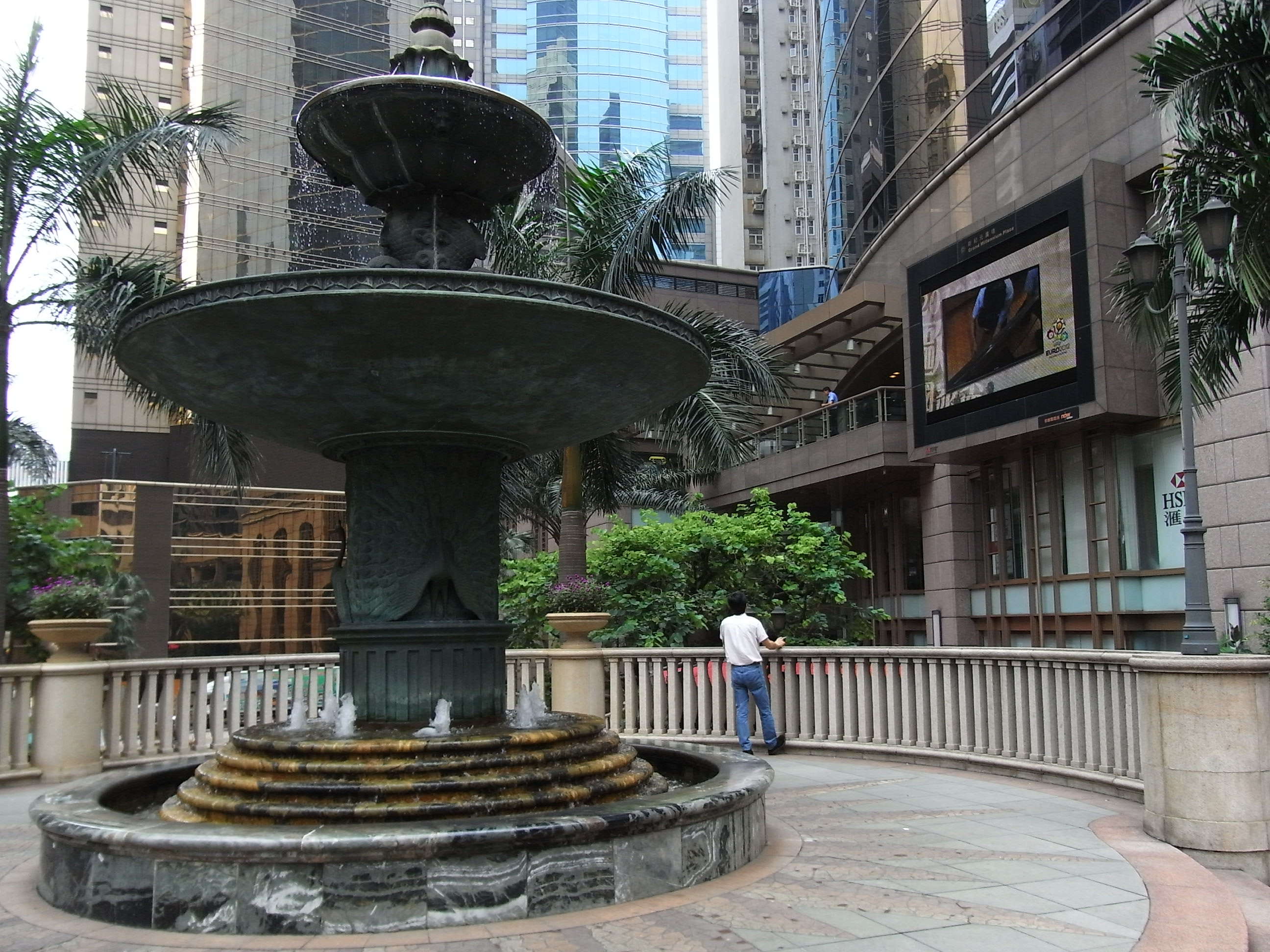
Now the place is re-developed as a garden square, with a fountain.

Wing Sing Street (traditional Chinese: 永勝街; simplified Chinese: 永胜街; pinyin: Yǒngshèng Jiē; Cantonese Yale: wing5 sing3 gaai1), commonly known as Duck Egg Street (鴨蛋街), was a street in Sheung Wan, Hong Kong.

The market was erased from the map by Land Development Corporation for the re-development of the area bounded by Wing Lok Street, Man Wa Lane, Bonham Strand, Queen's Road Central and Wing Wo Street.

The narrow street was well known for its egg market, dating back to early Chinese settlement of Victoria City on Hong Kong Island. The bounded area now contains the Cosco Tower and Grand Millennium Plaza.

== See also ==
- List of streets and roads in Hong Kong
