= Citybus Route 5 =

1928–2015 bus route in Hong Kong

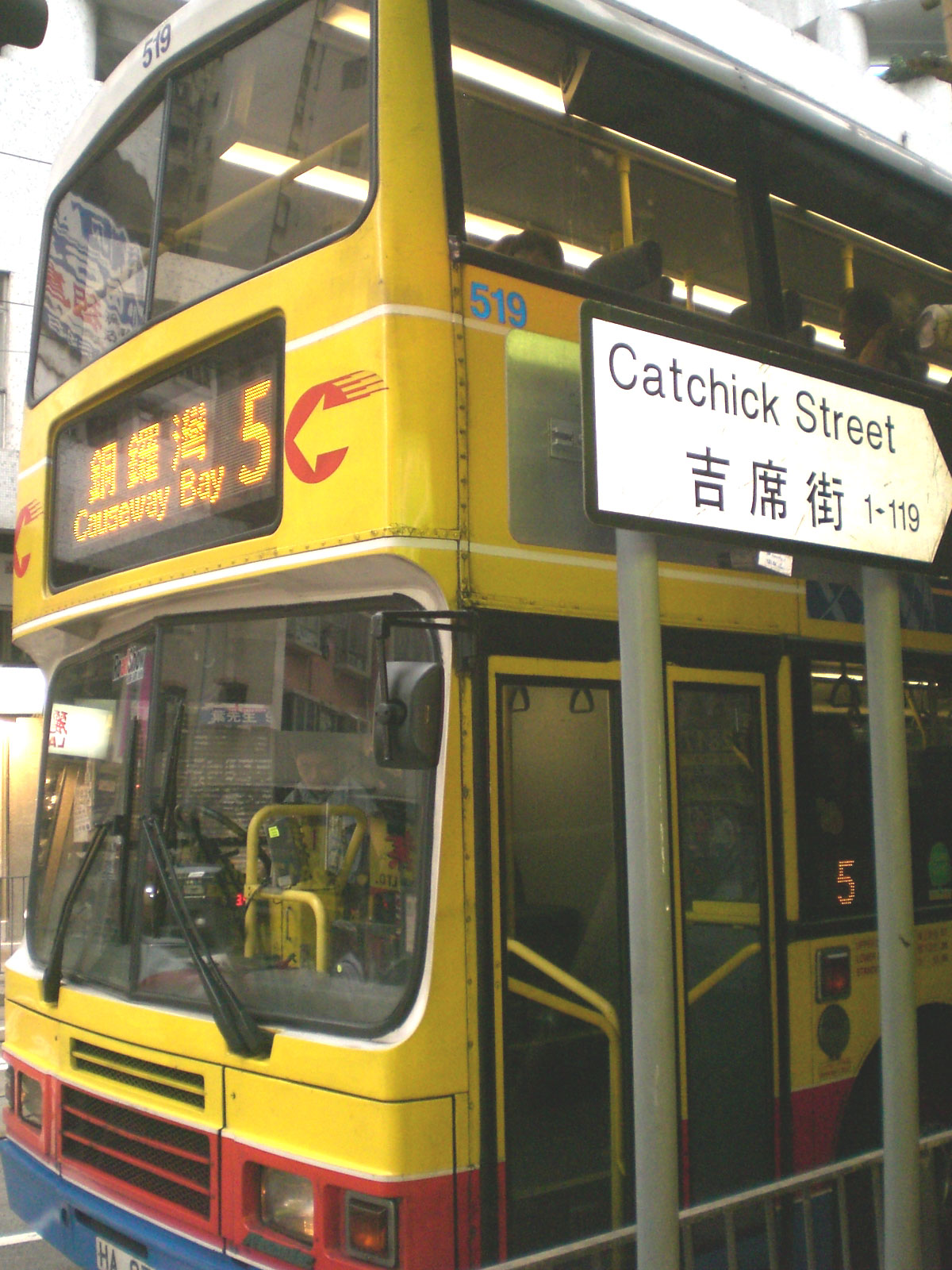
A Citybus route 5 bus appears at Catchick Street, Kennedy Town

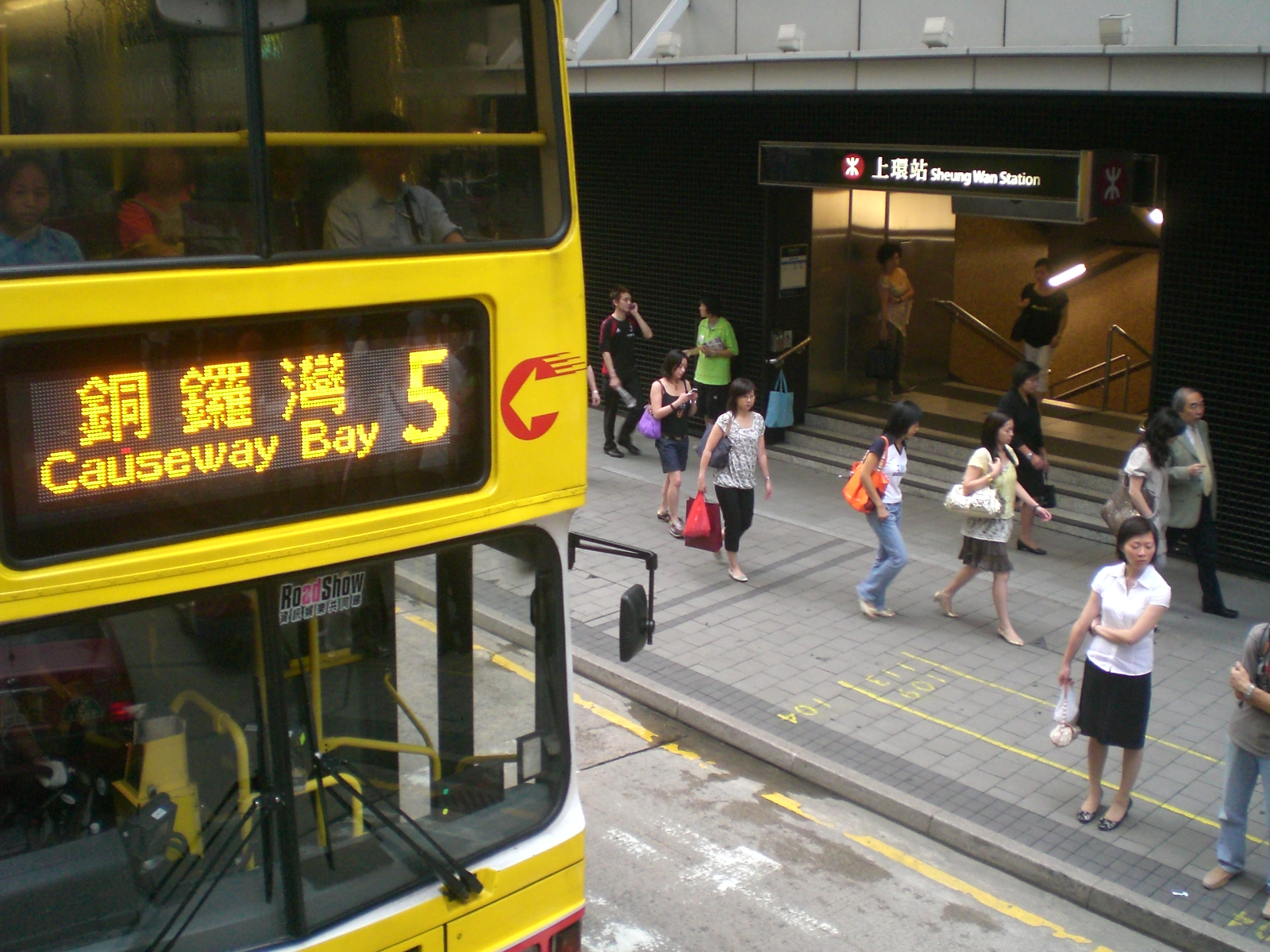
the same route bus appears at a Sheung Wan station exit, Des Voeux Road Central

Route 5 is a cancelled bus route on Hong Kong Island operated by Citybus (Hong Kong), between Felix Villas (Mount Davis) (摩星嶺) and Causeway Bay (Whitfield Road) (銅鑼灣威非路道).

== Timeline ==
- 1928: started by Hong Kong Hotel between Causeway Bay and Shek Tong Tsui.
- 11 June 1933: taken over by China Motor Bus as part of the Hong Kong Island bus franchise, and given the number 5. The route then served between Tai Hang and Kennedy Town by way of Queen's Road and Belcher's Street.
- Service suspended during Japanese occupation of Hong Kong.
- April 1946: service resumed between Royal Pier, Central and Tai Hang
- 13 May 1946: service extended to Central Ferry Piers.
- 6 July 1946: service extended to Possession Point, and 1948-11-01 to Kennedy Town. Patronage increased with the flow of refugees into Hong Kong fleeing the then raging civil war in mainland China, and the role borne by the route as a feeder route for ferries.
- April 1962: service was extended to 02:00.
- July 1962: route diverted to pass through Happy Valley.
- 10 April 1973: eastern terminus was changed to the magistrate in Causeway Bay (present day Park Towers).
- 1 May 1980: route cut back to Sai Ying Pun (Centre Street), and service was reduced to weekday mornings until evenings.
- 8 January 1982: eastern terminus moved to Whitfield Road.
- 1 September 1993: route taken over by Citybus among a total of 26 routes taken over at the same time, with air-conditioned services added, but initially with the same service time.
- 9 December 1996: on request by residents and district councillors, the route returned to Kennedy Town, but not with all services due to lack of space at the terminus; morning services terminated in Sai Ying Pun.
- 20 January 1997: holiday services added, all terminating in Kennedy Town.
- 22 August 1998: since this date, all services terminated in Kennedy Town, by way of Hennessy Road instead of Queen's Road East.
- 31 May 2004: service was further extended to Mount Davis to take over 5A services west of Kennedy Town. Patronage remains high with the lack of MTR services in Western District.
- 10 May 2015: route cancelled and will have Citybus Route 1 take over the Felix Villas section.
