= Citybus Route 1 =

Bus route in Hong Kong

1
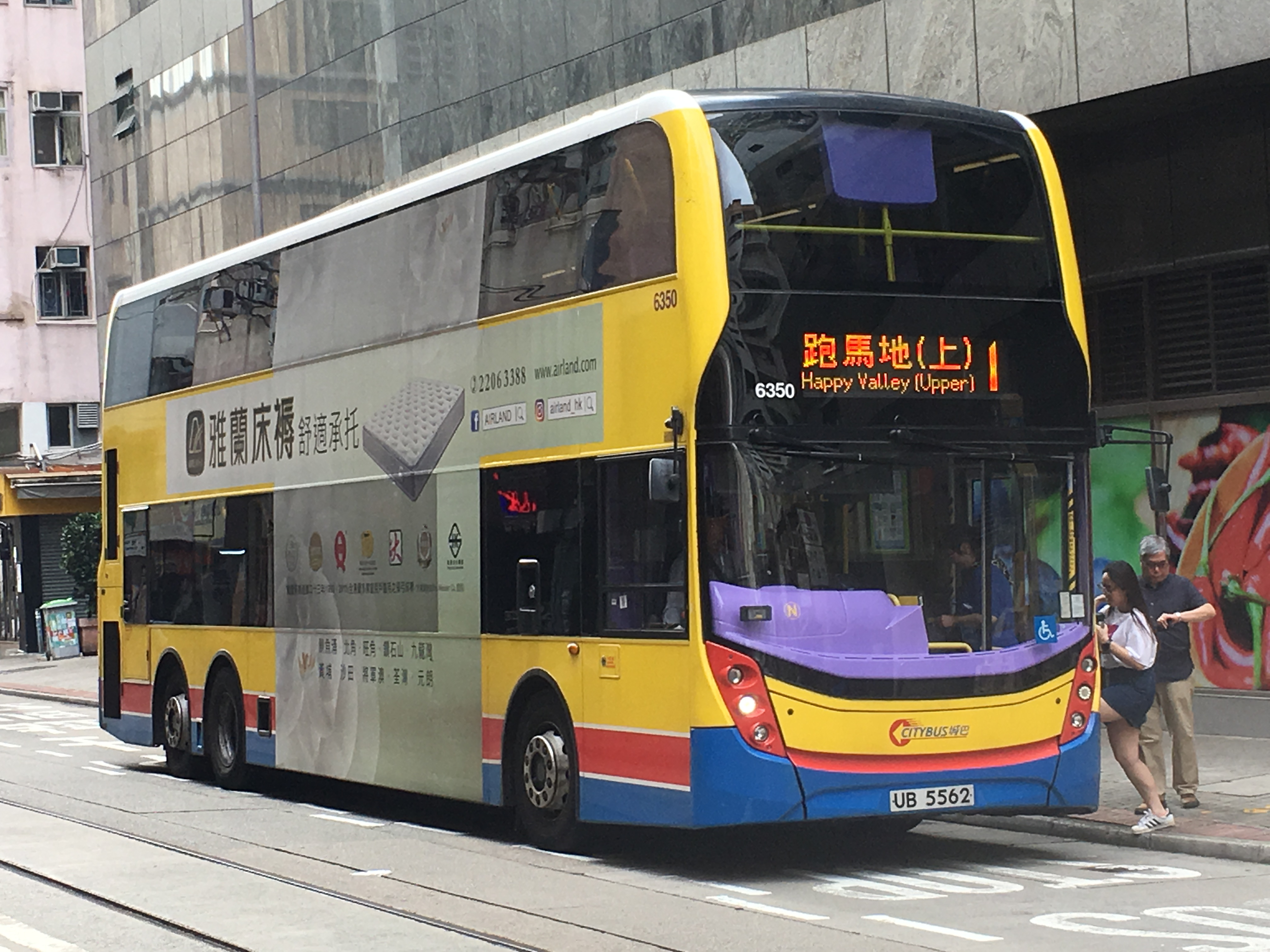
- A bus on Route 1 in Kennedy Town.

Overview
- Operator: Citybus
- Garage: Chai Wan (E); Tuen Mun (N)
- Vehicle: Alexander Dennis Enviro500 MMC 12m and 12.8m

Route
- Start: Happy Valley (Upper)
- Via: Wan Chai Road; Admiralty; Central; Sheung Wan, Hong Kong
- End: Central (Macau Ferry)
- Length: 7km

Service
- Level: Daily
- Frequency: 12–15 minutes
- Journey time: ~32 minutes
- Operates: 06:00 until 23:15

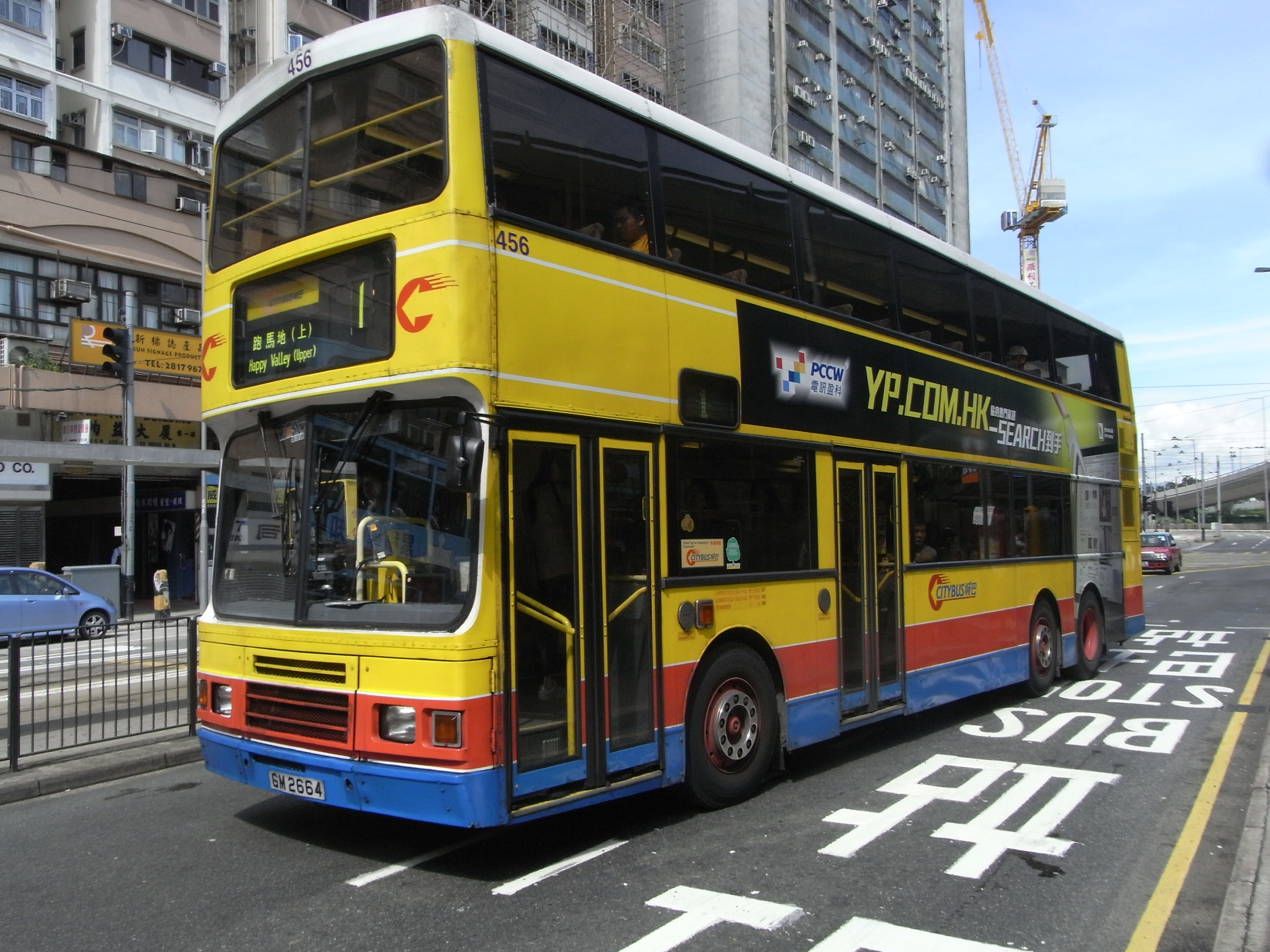
A Volvo Olympian 12m serving on route 1, spotted at Des Voeux Road West.

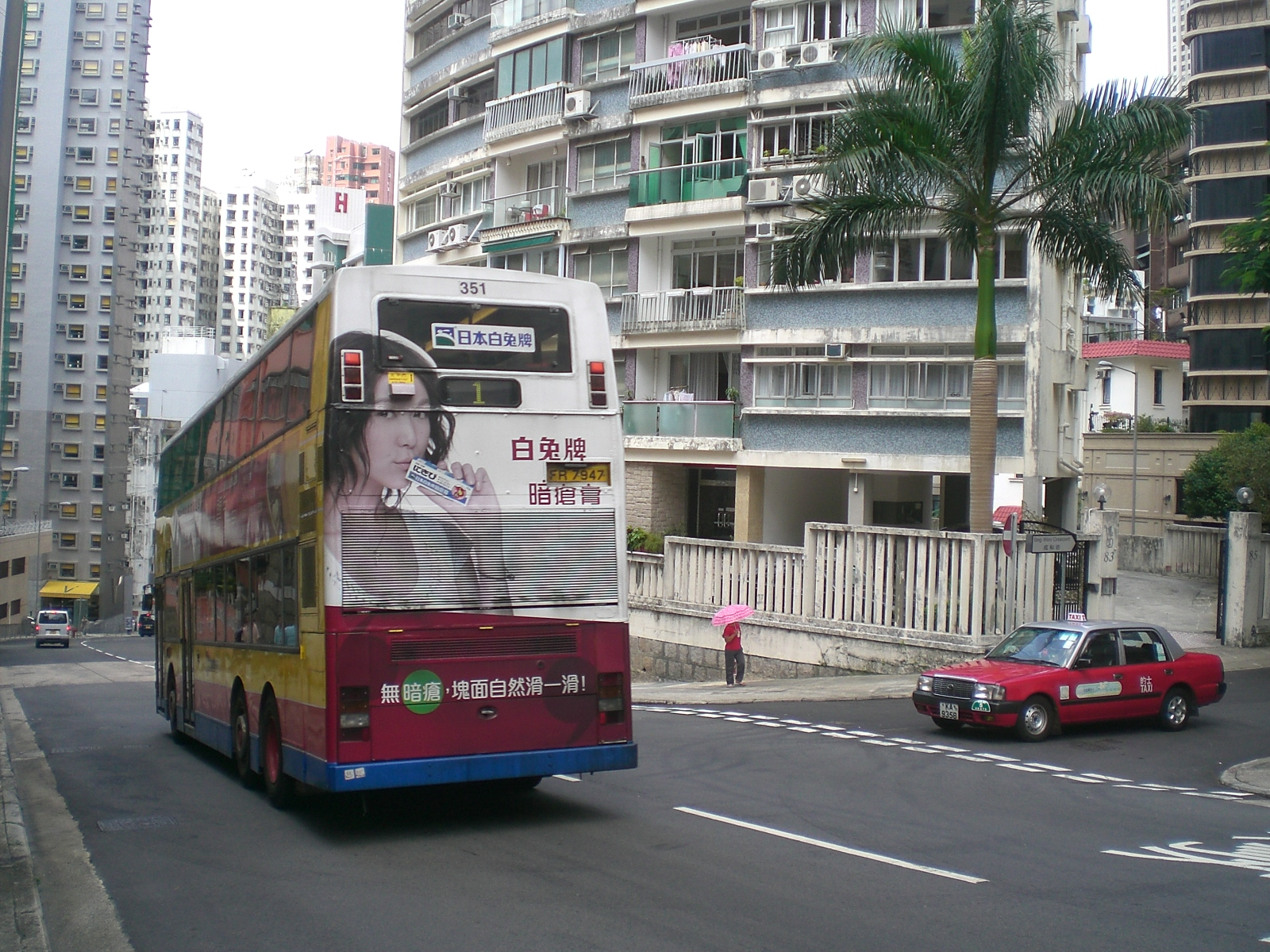
A Leyland Olympian (351) running on route 1, seen at Sing Woo Road, Happy Valley.

Citybus Route 1 is a bus route operated by Citybus (CTB) on Hong Kong Island, running between Central (Macau Ferry) and Happy Valley (Upper) via Central, Admiralty and Wan Chai.

It is one of the oldest existing bus routes in Hong Kong, having been in continuous operation ever since 1928 (except for a short break during the Japanese occupation).

== History ==
The route was started on 5 November 1928 by Hong Kong Tramways, between Sai Wan and Happy Valley. At that time, it had no route number. Just several days after the inauguration of service, the western terminus was changed to Sheung Wan near Wing Lok Pier, in response to requests from the police.

On 11 June 1933 China Motor Bus gained the franchise of Hong Kong Island bus services, and the route was given the number "1". The route was truncated from Sheung Wan to Blake Pier in Central on the same day, before relocating its terminus to the neighbouring Vehicular Ferry Pier in 1934. On 1 April 1935, the service was extended to Sai Ying Pun, and the arrangement of having first and second class ticket prices was added. However, on 1 January 1939 the route was cut back to Vehicular Ferry Pier, the terminal before 1935.

During Japanese occupation, the route was suspended. Within a month after the restoration of British rule, limited service on the route was resumed on 22 September 1945 between Vehicular Ferry Pier and Tai Hang via Happy Valley. In January 1946 the terminus was modified to Central Market. At this time there were five buses servicing the route, when the route was the only one in service by CMB. In February there were only three buses left due to lack of repair, and the route was divided into two separate services, Central Market – Tai Hang and Vehicular Ferry Pier – Happy Valley. In May service was resumed on route 5, so the terminus of route 1 was changed to Central Ferry Piers, with two buses servicing. By next February there were six buses on the route.

The early 1960s saw both of route 1's termini being relocated. On 1 January 1960 the route was extended from the Vehicular Ferry Pier to Cleverly Street in Sheung Wan, while in 1962 the Happy Valley terminus was changed from Blue Pool Road to Broom Road. In 1972 the route was classified into the category of urban slope routes, which had a higher price than normal urban routes and lead to a loss of patronage. In 1980 the western terminus of the route was changed to Central (Macau Ferry), and again in 1987 to Rumsey Street. On 1 September 1993 the route was transferred to CTB, and was designated a full air-conditioned service. On 31 May 1996 the Central terminus was moved to a new bus terminal of the same name, on newly reclaimed land.

=== Route numbering controversy ===
After the acquisition of CTB by Chow Tai Fook, NWFB's mother company, the rearrangement of bus services lead to a proposal of merger of the route with 5A, which ran between Happy Valley (Lower) and Felix Villas. Such a amalgamation was mooted as early as 1986 when the routes were still operated by CMB, but had never been approved well until 2004.

Under the original proposals the resultant route would perpetuate the route number "5A", but community leaders had divided opinions regarding whether "5A" or "1" should be retained. The Wan Chai District Council insisted on the former, an opinion that councillors of Central and Western District objected to. Suggestions of naming the route "1/5A" were rejected by Citybus, citing the reason that the slash was unavailable on rollsigns. It was later decided that the merger would take place as scheduled on 31 May 2004, and the merged route plying between Kennedy Town (Belcher Bay) and Happy Valley (Upper) would take on both the numbers of "1" and "5A" for the time being. This unique arrangement meant that buses displaying the two numbers would depart alternately from the same termini. On 28 June 2004 the terminus in Kennedy Town was switched to Sai Ning Street bus terminus.

The use of two numbers for the same route led to confusion among the public. In view of this the two aforementioned district councils reached the consensus that only one number should be adopted for the merged route, and the decision should be made through a public opinion survey. Among the 1,056 passengers of 1/5A passengers surveyed, 38% believed that the route should be named "1", while 25% called for the retention of "5A". Consequently, route 5A was put out of service.

=== Recent developments ===
As a result of the MTR West Island line Extension, Citybus Route 5 was cancelled whilst the route was extended to Felix Villas effective 10 May 2015. As of 2015, route 1 held the record of being the bus service in Hong Kong with the highest number of terminus modifications (15 times), with 4 pre-war and 11 post-war.

On 6 October 2024, the route was truncated from Felix Villas to Macau Ferry, with interchange concessions with Route 5B introduced at the same time.

== Route ==
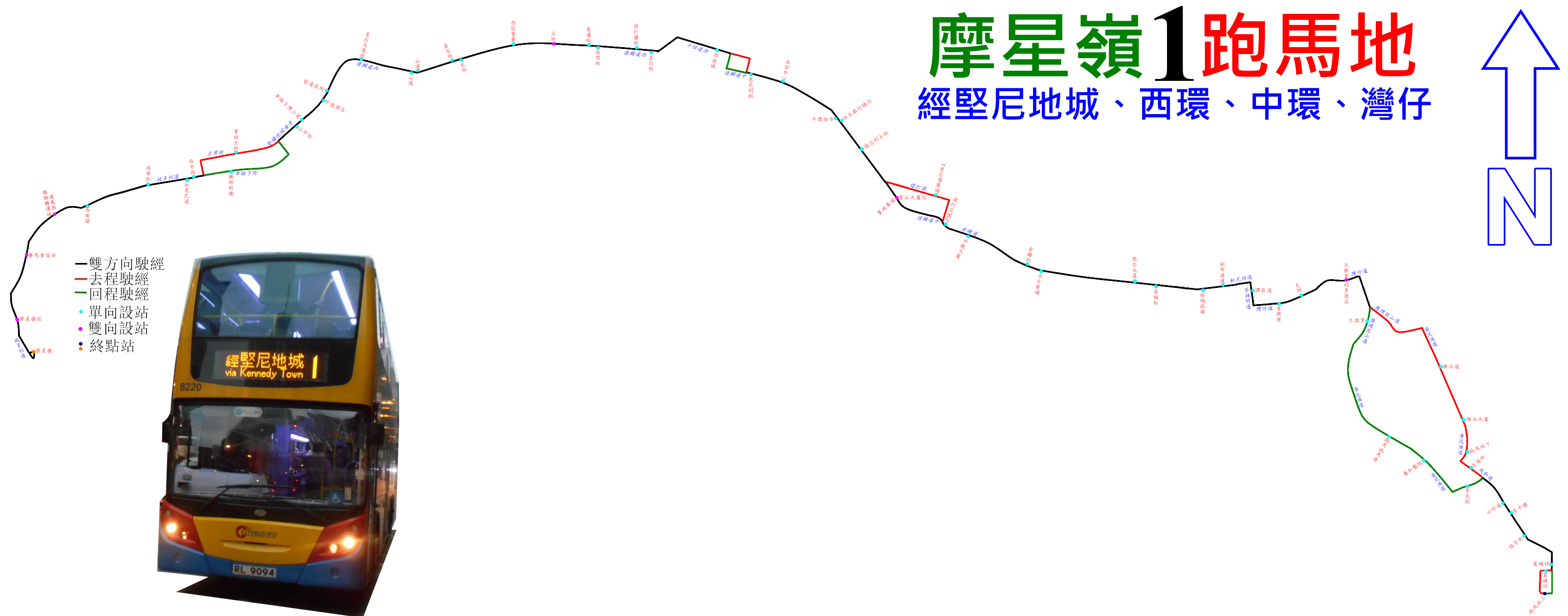
Line diagram of this line

1

Start at Felix Vilas			Start at Happy Valley (Upper)		
No.	Name of Bus stop	Place	No.	Name of Bus stop	Place
1	Felix Vilas		1	Happy Valley (Upper)	
2	Mount Davis Path	Victoria Road	2	Green Lane	Blue Pool Road
3	Caritas Jockey Club Hostel	Victoria Road	3	Kwai Fong Street	Shing Wo Road
4	Island West Transfer Station	Victoria Road	4	Village Road	Shing Wo Road
5	Sai Ning Street	Victoria Road	5	King Kwong Street	
6	Sai See Street	Victoria Road	6	Yeung Wo Hospital	Wong Nai Chung Road
7	Davis Street	Catchick Street	7	Happy Valley Racecourse	Wong Nai Chung Road
8	Belcher Bay Park	Praya, Kennedy Town	8	Lap Tak Lane	Morrison Hill Road
9	Collinson Street	Praya, Kennedy Town	9	The Charterhouse	Wan Chai Road
10	Kennedy Town Swimming Pool Sitting-out Area	Des Voeux Road West	10	Po Lok Lane	Wan Chai Road
11	Hill Road	Des Voeux Road West	11	Southon Playground	Hennessy Road
12	Ka On Street	Des Voeux Road West	12	Anton Street	Hennessy Road
13	Western Police Station	Des Voeux Road West	13	Pacific Place	Queensway
14	Centre Street	Des Voeux Road West	14	China Bank Building	Queensway
15	Eastern Street	Des Voeux Road West	15	The Landmark	Des Voeux Road Central
16	Sutherland Street	Des Voeux Road West	16	Central Market	Des Voeux Road Central
17	Wing On Centre	Des Vouex Road Central	17	Cleverly Street	Des Voeux Road Central
18	Hang Seng Bank Head Office	Des Vouex Road Central	18	West Market	Connaught Road West
19	Douglas Street	Des Vouex Road Central	19	Queen Street	Des Voeux Road West
20*	Statue Square	Charter Road	20	Ko Shing Street	Des Voeux Road West
^	Alexandra House	Des Vouex Road Central	21	Centre Street	Des Voeux Road West
^	Charter Garden	Des Vouex Road Central	22	Water Street	Des Voeux Road West
21	Admiralty Station	Queensway	23	Hill Road	Des Voeux Road West
22	Arsenal Street	Hennessy Road	24	Kennedy Town Swimming Pool	Praya, Kennedy Town
23	O’Brien Road	Hennessy Road	25	Sands Street	Praya, Kennedy Town
24	Thomson Road	Fleming Road	26	Luen Bong Apartment	Belcher Street
25	Heard Street	Wan Chai Road	27	Ka Wai Man Road	Victoria Road
26	Tin Lok Lane	Wan Chai Road	28	Sai Ning Court	Victoria Road
27	Broadwood Road	Wong Nai Chung Road	29	Island West Transfer Station	Victoria Road
28	Amigo Mansion	Wong Nai Chung Road	30	Caritas Jockey Club Hostel	Victoria Road
29	Happy Valley (Lower)		31	Mount Davis Path	Victoria Road
30	Yik Yam Street	Shing Wo Road	32	Felix Vilas	
31	Shing Ping House	Shing Wo Road			
32	Green Lane				
33	Happy Valley (Upper)				

- Every Sunday or Public Holiday, This route won't stop at * stops, it will change to ^ stops。

== Accidents ==
In the morning of 28 January 1984 a deadly accident involving a Guy Arab V on route 1 occurred at Wong Nai Chung Road in Happy Valley. The bus crashed into pedestrians, who were mostly parents and grandparents queuing up on the pavement to obtain admission forms from St. Paul's Primary Catholic School, after the driver lost control of it. A total of 6 deaths and 8 injuries were recorded and the government conducted an independent inquiry to delve into the causes.
