= Jervois Street =

Street in Hong Kong

Coordinates: 22.28514°N 114.15098°E

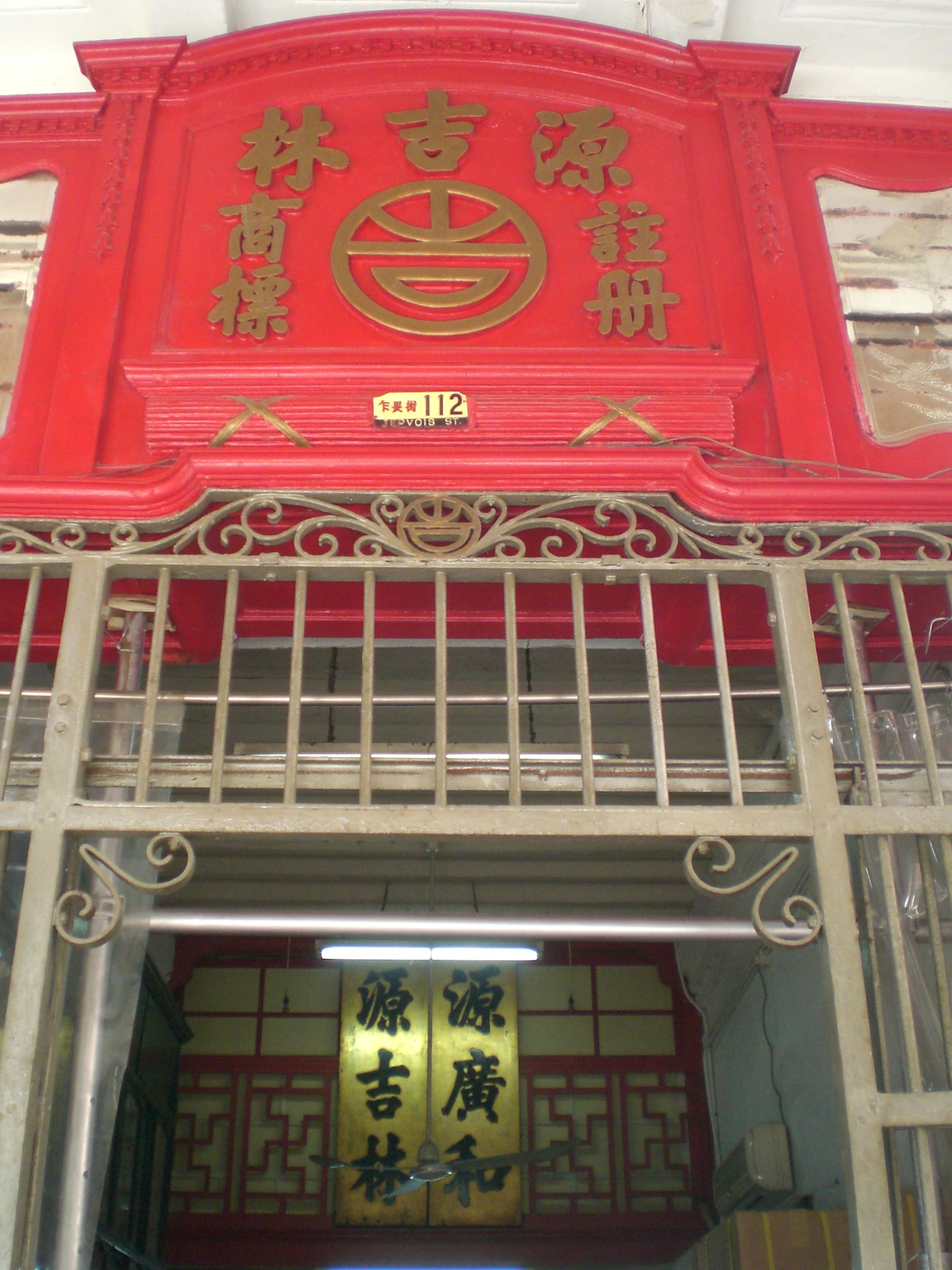
One of the old shops in the street

Jervois Street (Chinese: 蘇杭街, formerly 乍畏街) is a street in the Sheung Wan district of Hong Kong Island, Hong Kong.

== History ==
On 28 December 1851, a fire broke out and burned down Sheung Wan Market and hundreds of Chinese houses all around it, resulting in 30 deaths. The fire led to the redevelopment of the whole district, which was supervised by Major-General William Jervois, then Commander and Lieutenant Governor of Hong Kong.

== Nearby ==
- Queen's Road Central
- Morrison Street
- Hillier Street
- Cleverly Street
- Mercer Street
- Bonham Strand
- COSCO Tower
- Wellington Street

== See also ==
- List of streets and roads in Hong Kong
