= Hillier Street =

Street in Sheung Wan, Hong Kong

Coordinates: 22.28517°N 114.15137°E

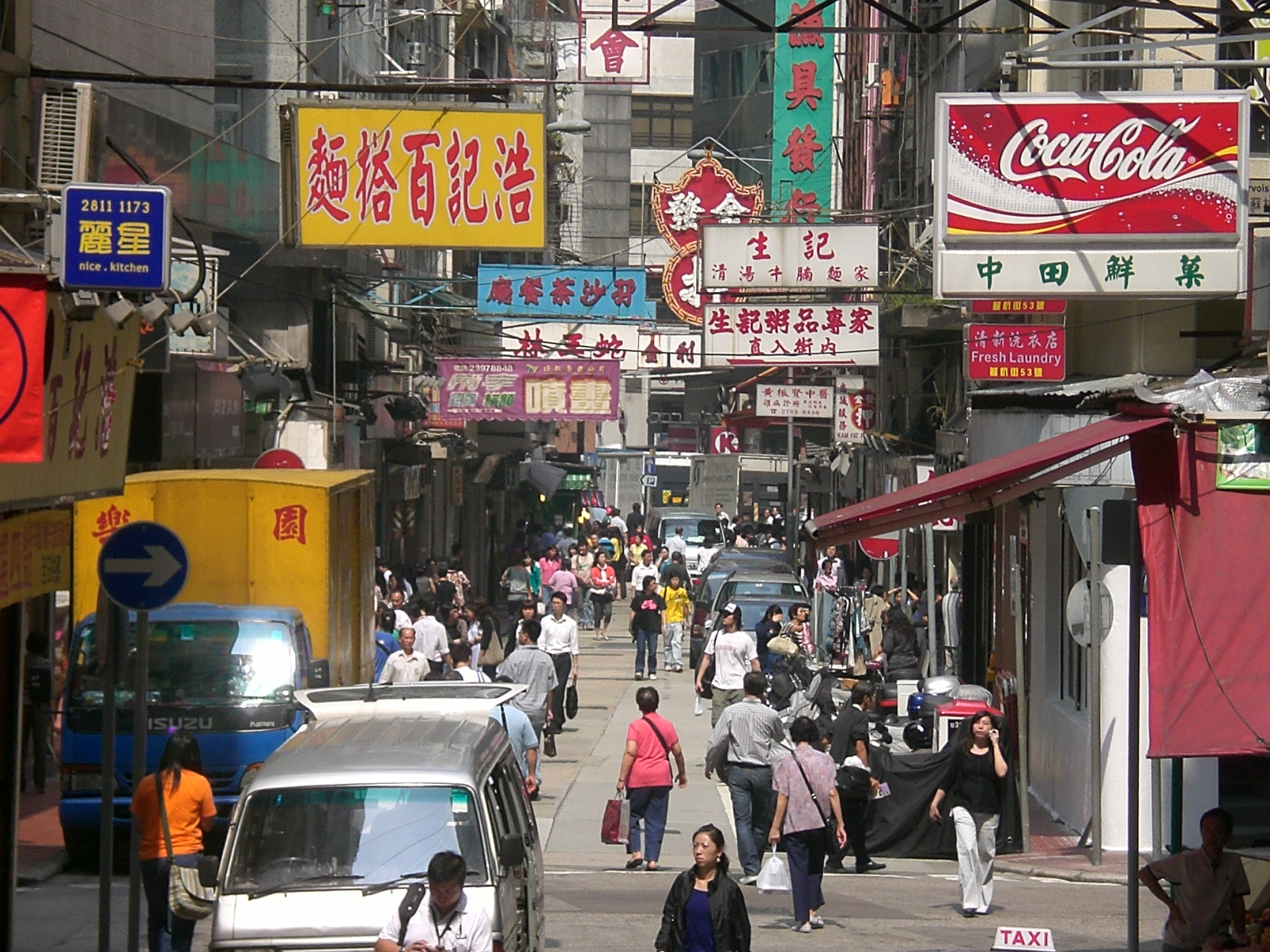
Hillier Street, Sheung Wan in October 2007.

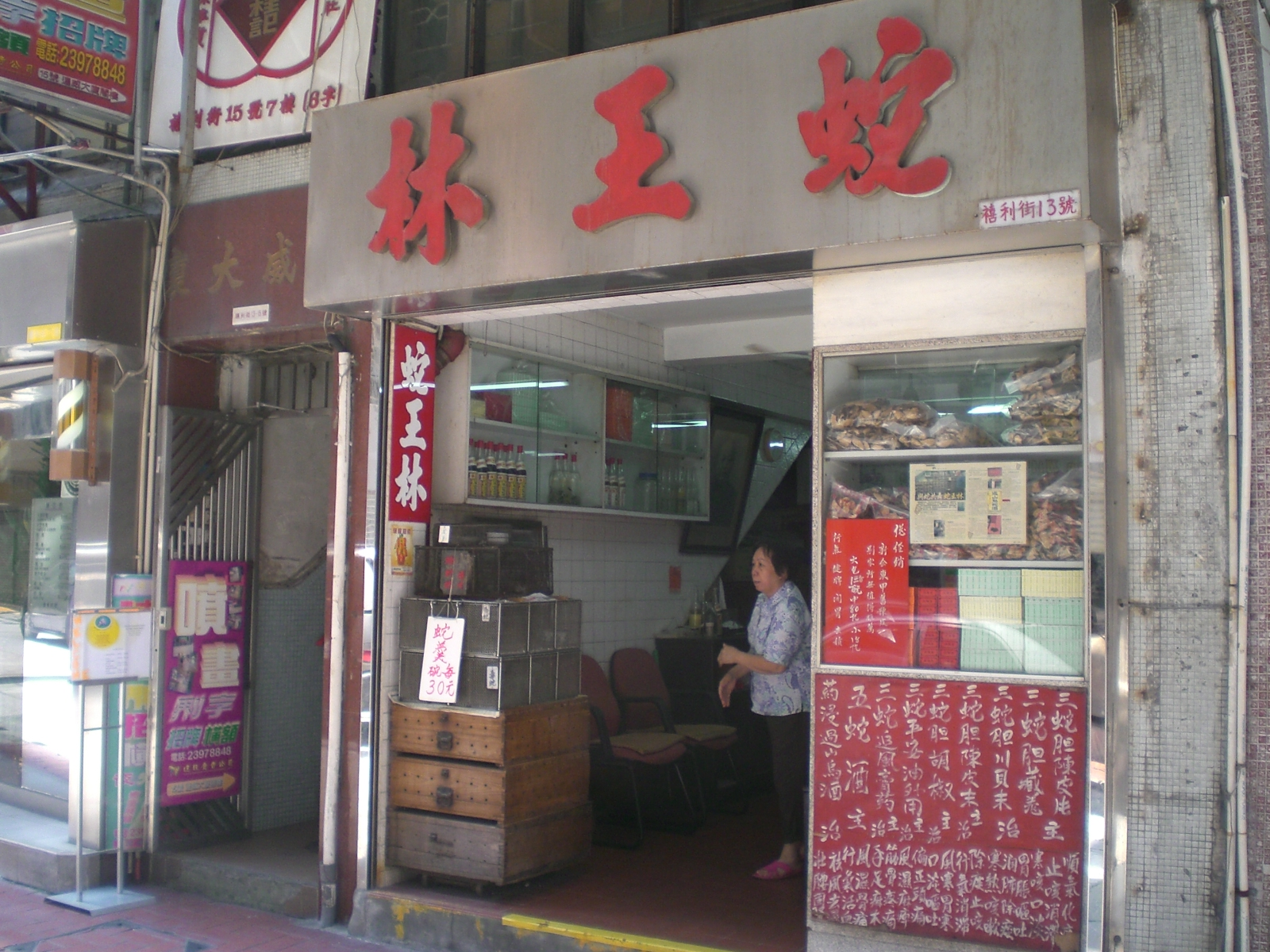
A snake soup shop on the street in October 2007.

Hillier Street (Chinese: 禧利街), is a street in Sheung Wan of Hong Kong Island, Hong Kong, located between Connaught Road Central and Queen's Road Central.

== Name ==
It was named after Charles Batten Hillier. Hillier was chief magistrate of Hong Kong from 1847 to 1856, and then took up the consulship to Siam but survived there for only a few months before dying of dysentery.

== Roads and streets nearby ==
- Sheung Wan station of the MTR
- Wing Lok Street
- Des Voeux Road Central
- Bonham Strand
- Mercer Street
- Burd Street
- Jervois Street
- Kwai Wa Lane

== Sources ==
- Bloomfield, Frena (1984). Hong Kong's Street Names and Their Origins. Vol. 1. Urban Council, Hong Kong. ASIN B000HZIVAE. OCLC 320407030. Archived from the original on 2014-11-07.
- UK in Thailand Embassy history: Charles Batten Hillier
- Endacott, G. B. (2005) [1962]. "Chapter: Charles Batten Hillier". A biographical sketch-book of early Hong Kong. Hong Kong University Press. pp. 84–88. ISBN 978-962-209-742-1.
