= Man Wa Lane =

Coordinates: 22.28596°N 114.15242°E

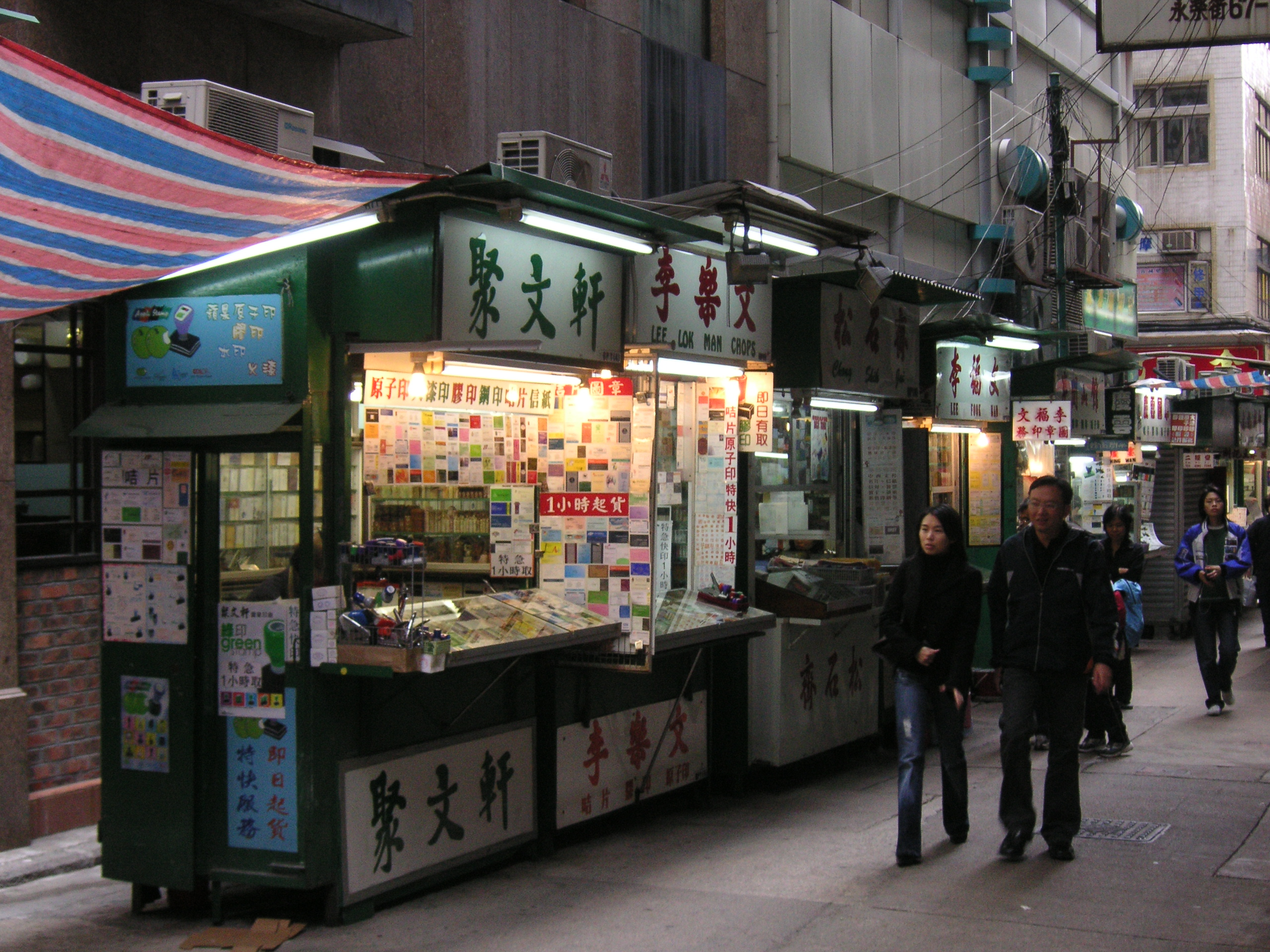
Chop-makers in Man Wa Lane

Man Wa Lane (Chinese: 文華里; Jyutping: man4 waa4 lei5), also commonly known as Chop Alley (圖章街; tou4 zoeng1 gaai1, Malay: Lorong Cincang), is a lane in Sheung Wan, Hong Kong, spanning from Bonham Strand to Connaught Road Central, across Wing Lok Street and Des Voeux Road Central.

Man Wa Lane is famous for stalls of chop-makers. The chops range from traditional Chinese seals to modern rubber stamps. Some stalls also offer services to print various cards.

== See also ==
- List of streets and roads in Hong Kong
