= Hollywood Road Park =

Public park in Sheung Wan, Hong Kong

Coordinates: 22°17′10″N 114°08′52″E

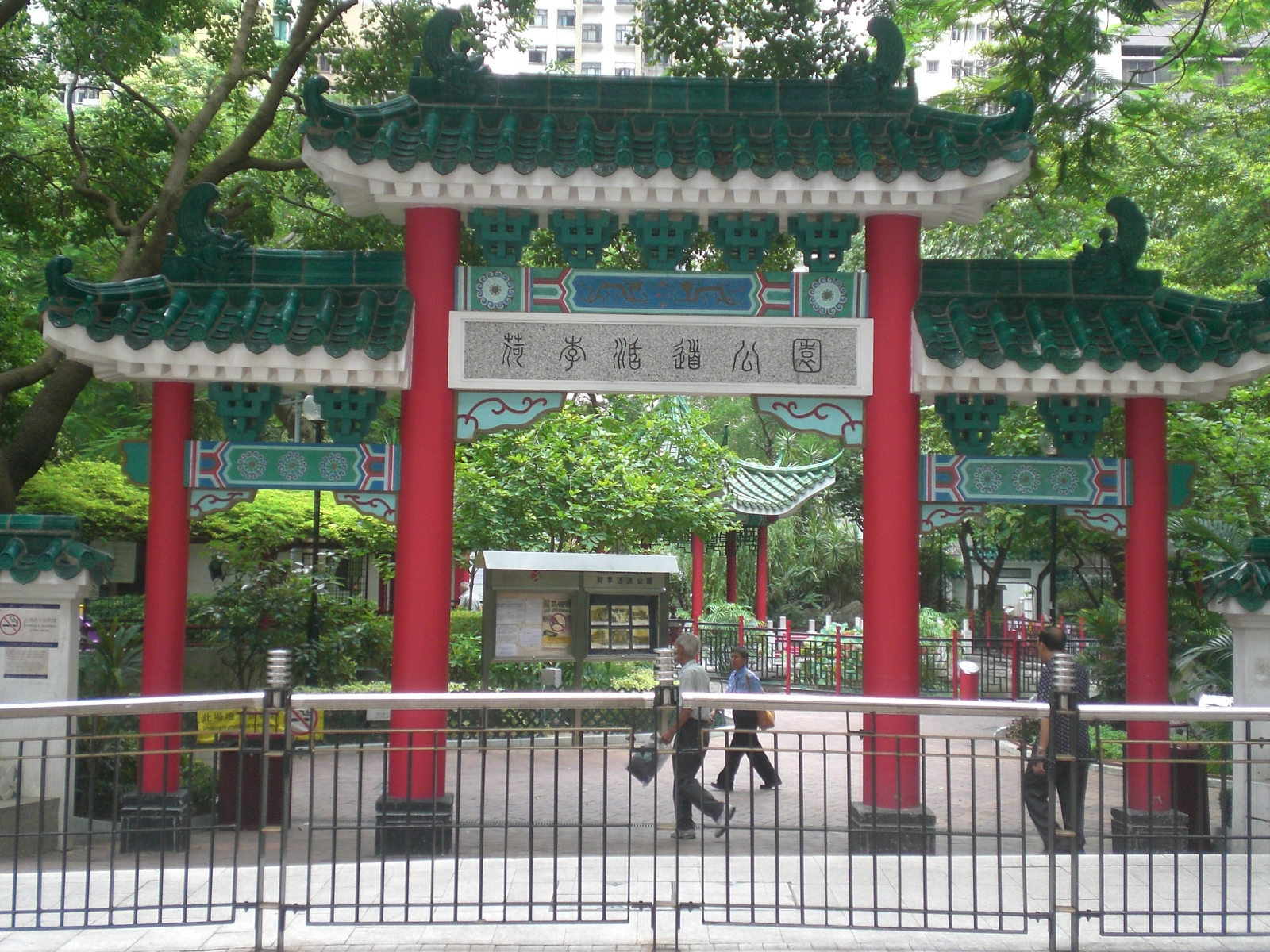
Park entrance along Hollywood Road.

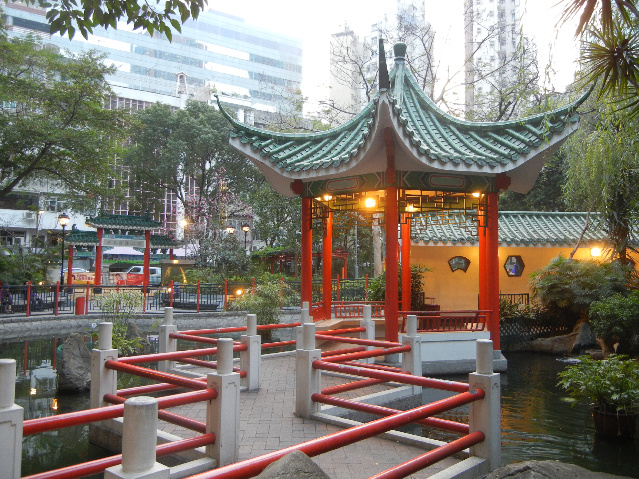
Zig-zag bridge, pavilion and pond.

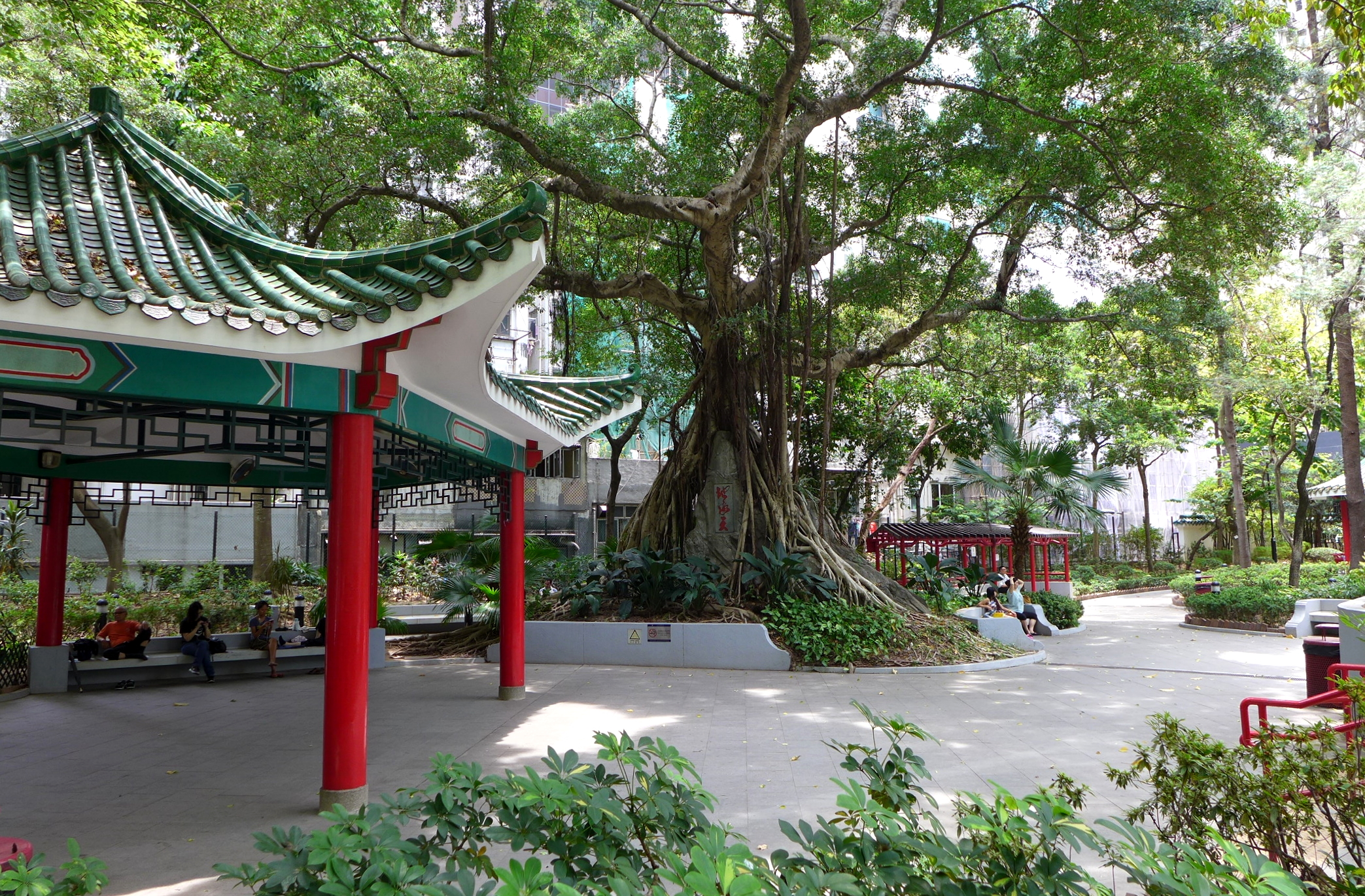
Chinese banyan inside the park.

Hollywood Road Park (Chinese: 荷李活道公園) is an urban public park in Sheung Wan, Hong Kong Island, Hong Kong.

The park is built in Chinese architectural style and is surrounded by buildings nearby.

== History ==
In maps of the 1980s and before, Hollywood Road Park is marked as Possession Point. Possession Point is the location where the Royal Navy landed on Hong Kong Island, before the signing of the Treaty of Nanking. The commander of Far East Fleet, Gordon Bremer, came to Hong Kong via HMS Calliope on 26 January 1841. A flag raising and gun ceremony marked the official possession of Hong Kong, and the landing venue was renamed as Possession Point. And this date is considered as the foundation of Hong Kong.

Hollywood Road Park is also the site of the former Tai Tat Tei (or Dai tat dei, lit. "large piece of land"), which was nicknamed the "poor man's nightclub" in the 1960s and 1970s. The Tai Tat Tei was popular bazaar market. It showcased a rendez-vous of old Hong Kong style street entertainment activities. People gathered to browse at night market, eat cheap food and watch free entertainment.
