= Central (Macau Ferry) Bus Terminus =

Central (Macau Ferry) Bus Terminus 中環（港澳碼頭）巴士總站
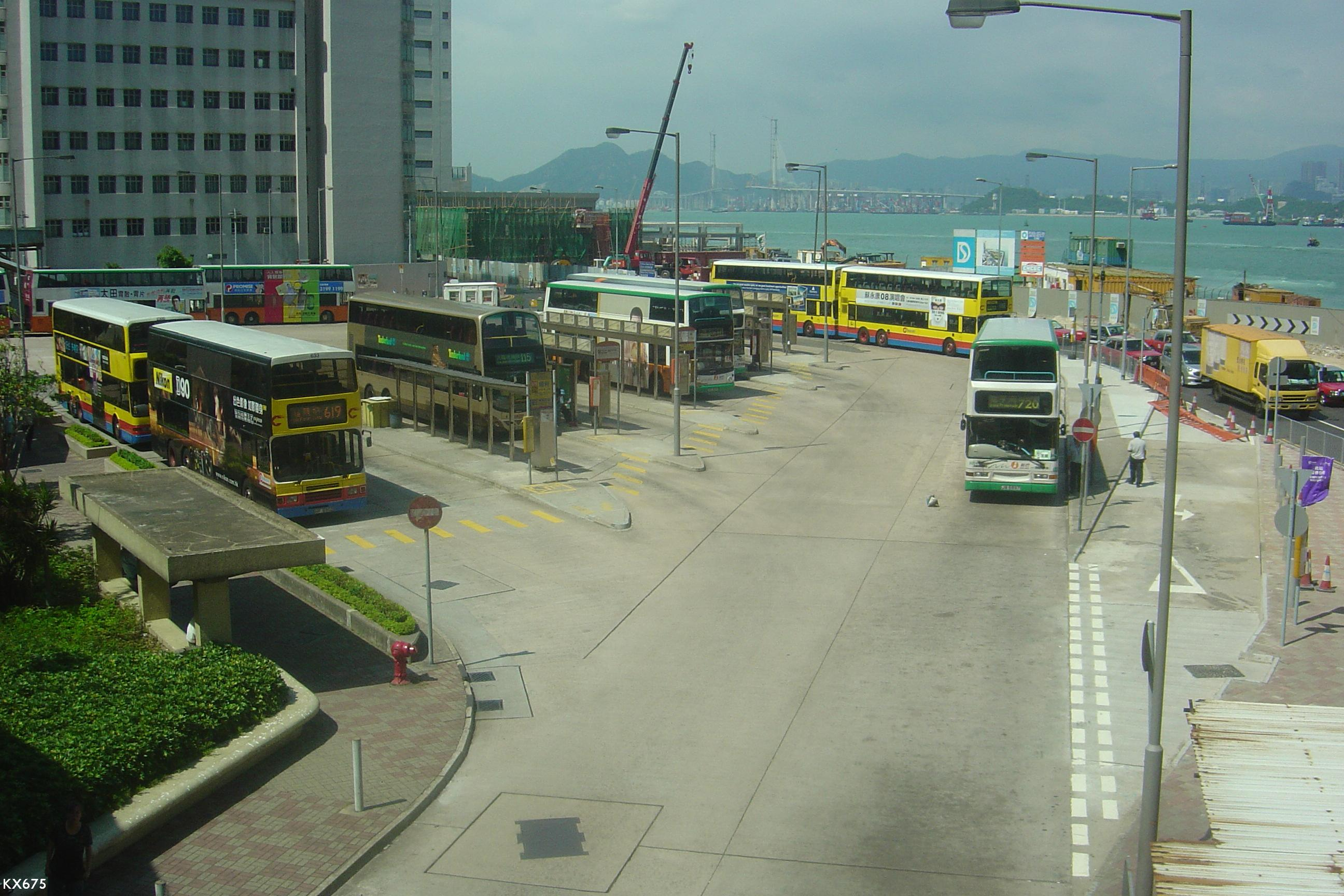

General information
- Location: Connaught Road Central; West of Shun Tak Centre; Sheung Wan; Central and Western
- Bus routes: Routes ending here (without return journey): Routes 115P and 619P
- Connections: Feeder transport: MTR Island line Sheung Wan station Exit D Hong Kong–Macau Ferry Terminal for ferries towards Macau and places around Guangdong; Major streets nearby: Connaught Road Central, Chung Kong Road, Chung King Road; Major structures/sights nearby: Shun Tak Centre (Hong Kong–Macau Ferry Terminal) Western Market, Waterfront Police Station

History
- Opened: First generation: 15 February 1981; 45 years ago; Current terminus: 1 April 1988; 38 years ago
Location

The Central (Macau Ferry) Bus Terminus (Chinese: 中環（港澳碼頭）巴士總站) is a major bus terminus located in Sheung Wan, Central and Western District, Hong Kong, next to the Hong Kong–Macau Ferry Terminal. It is one of the largest open-air bus terminus in Hong Kong and is home to a large variety of cross-harbour tunnel bus routes towards points in Kowloon and the New Territories, making the terminus one of the most important transport interchanges in Hong Kong.

== Facilities ==
Regulators' kiosks for CTB and NWFB are located next to the exit of the terminus. Also, a bus captains' rest kiosk is also set up at the berth for Route 788.

== Feeder transport ==
- MTR Island line Sheung Wan station Exit D
