= Sheung Wan =

Area in Hong Kong

Coordinates: 22°17′07″N 114°09′05″E

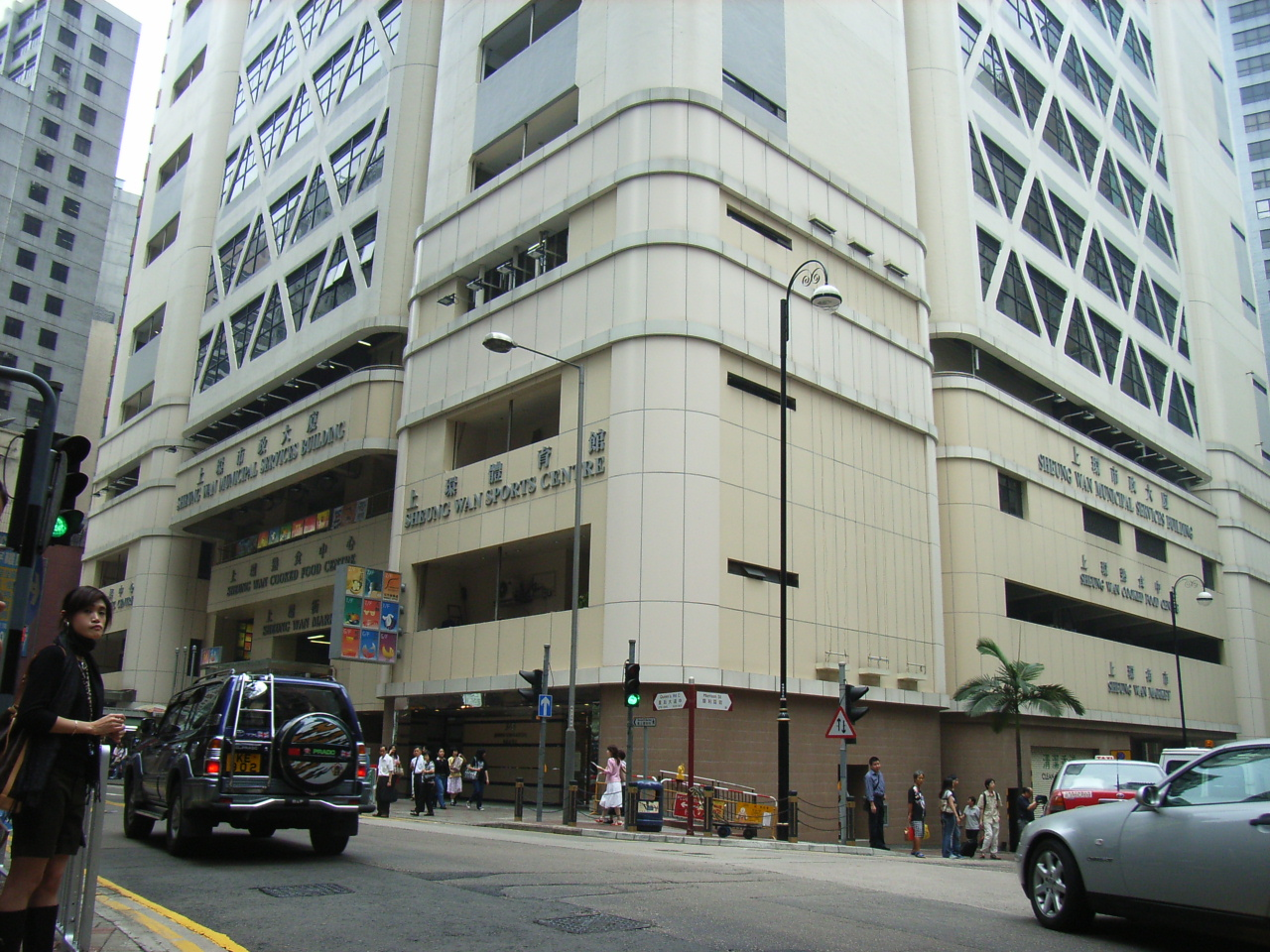
- Sheung Wan Civic Centre, at the corner of Queen's Road Central and Morrison Street
- Traditional Chinese: 上環
- Simplified Chinese: 上环
Transcriptions
Standard Mandarin
- Hanyu Pinyin: Shànghuán
Yue: Cantonese
- Yale Romanization: Seuhng Waàhn
- Jyutping: Soeng6 Waan4
- IPA: [sœŋ˨ wan˩]

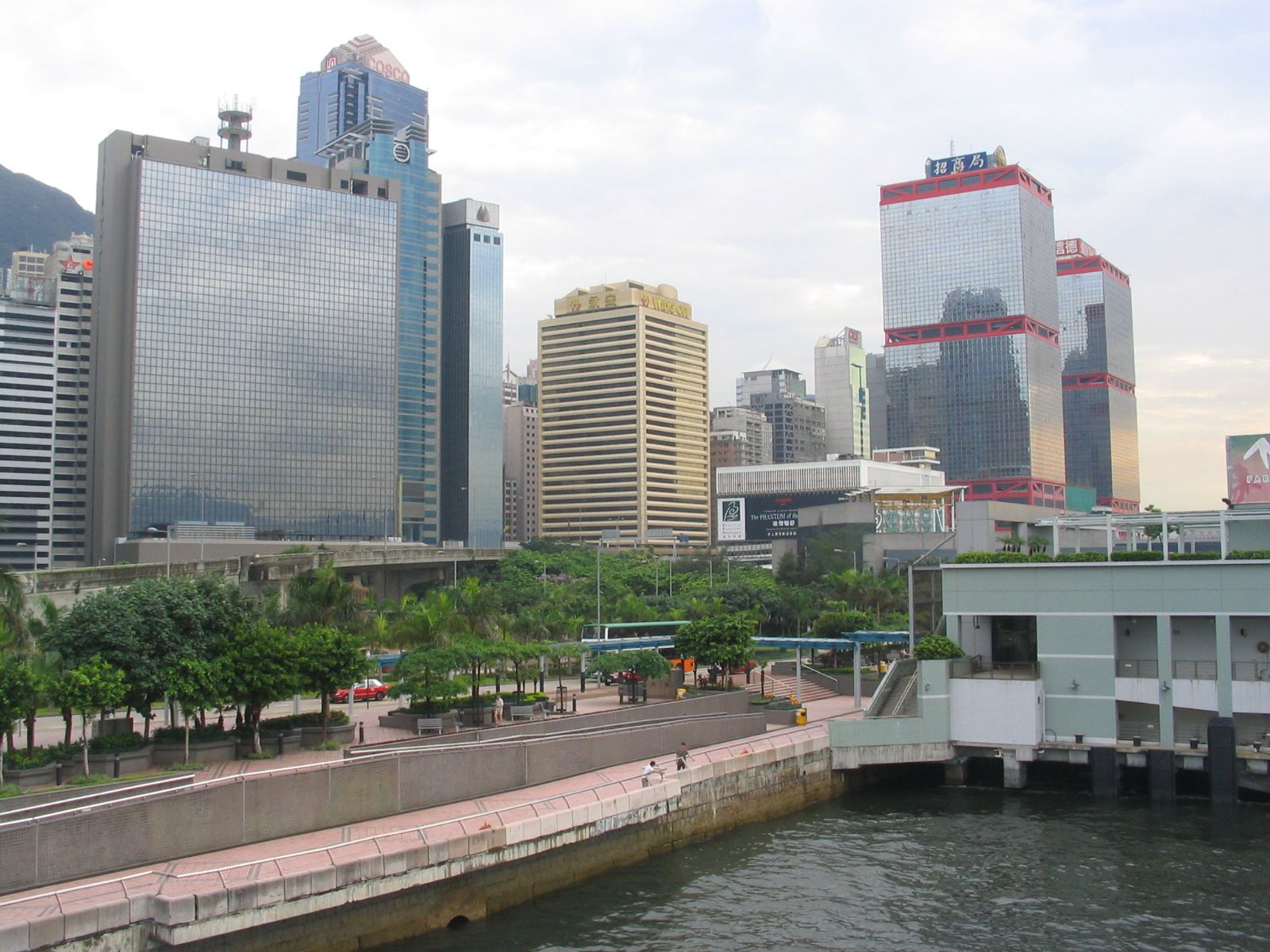
Coastal business buildings in Sheung Wan

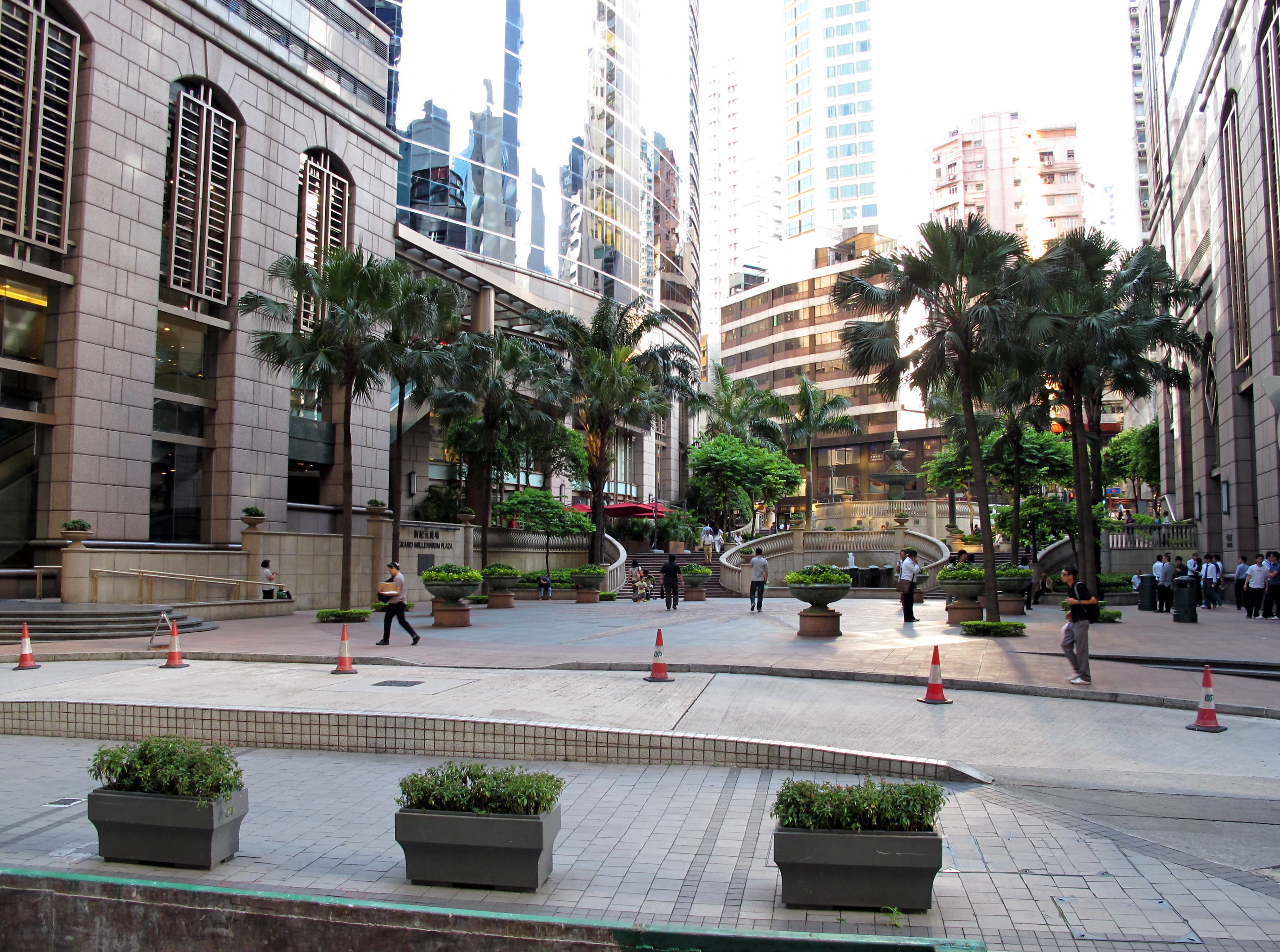
Millennium Plaza in Sheung Wan

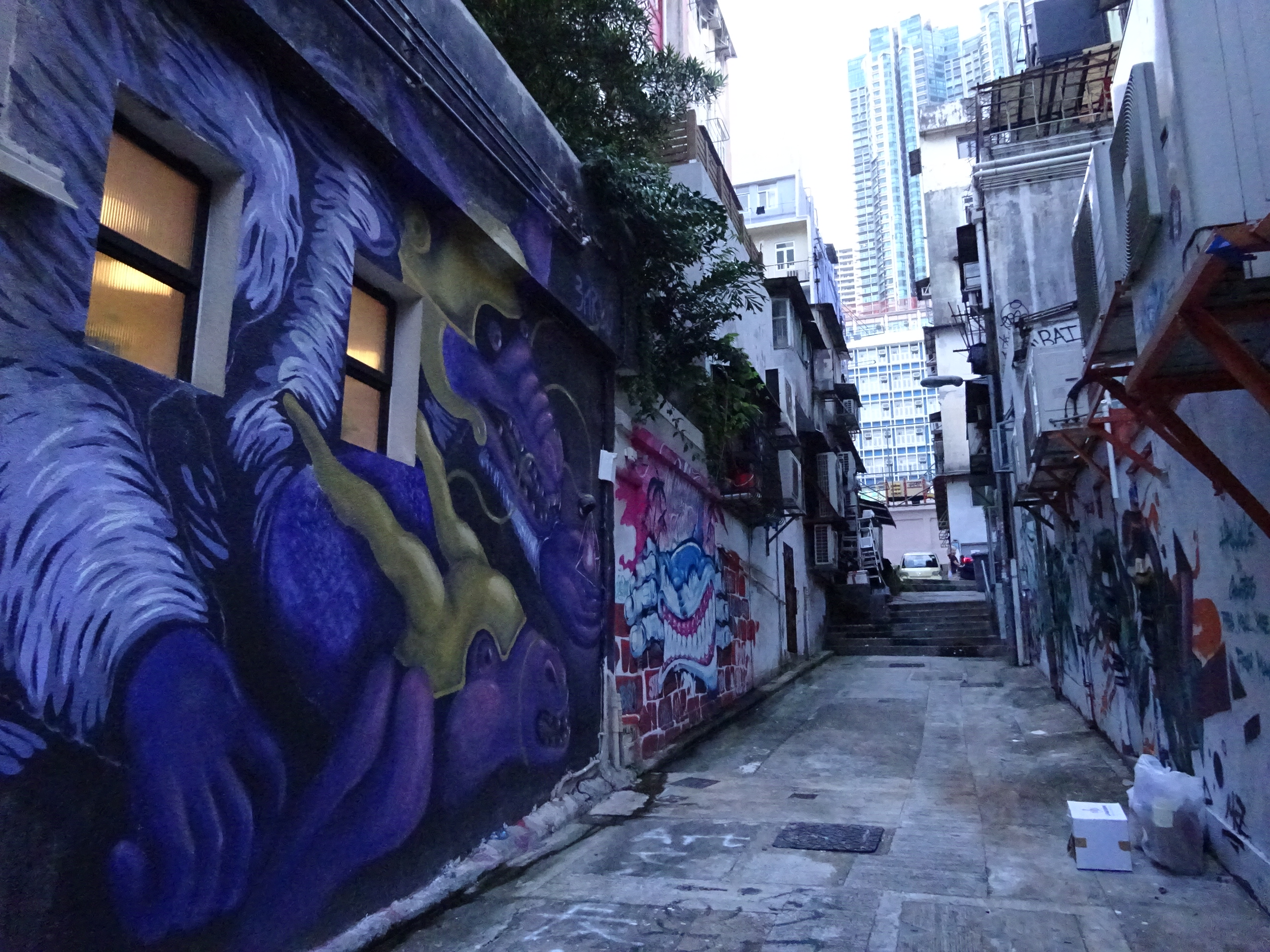
Tai Ping Shan Street Graffiti in Sheung Wan

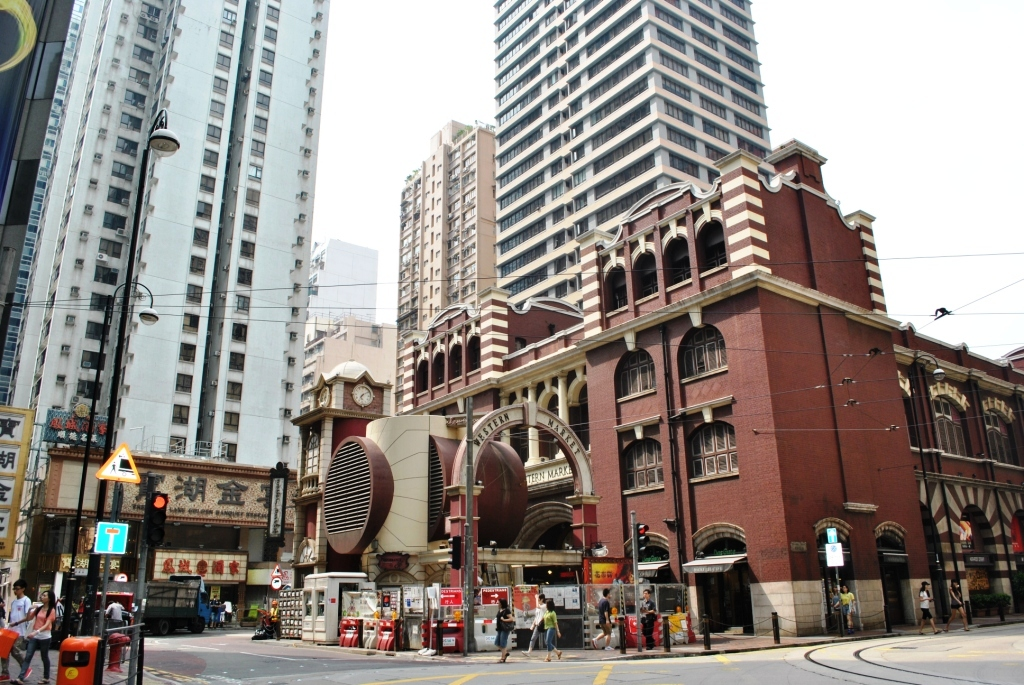
Western Market, Sheung Wan

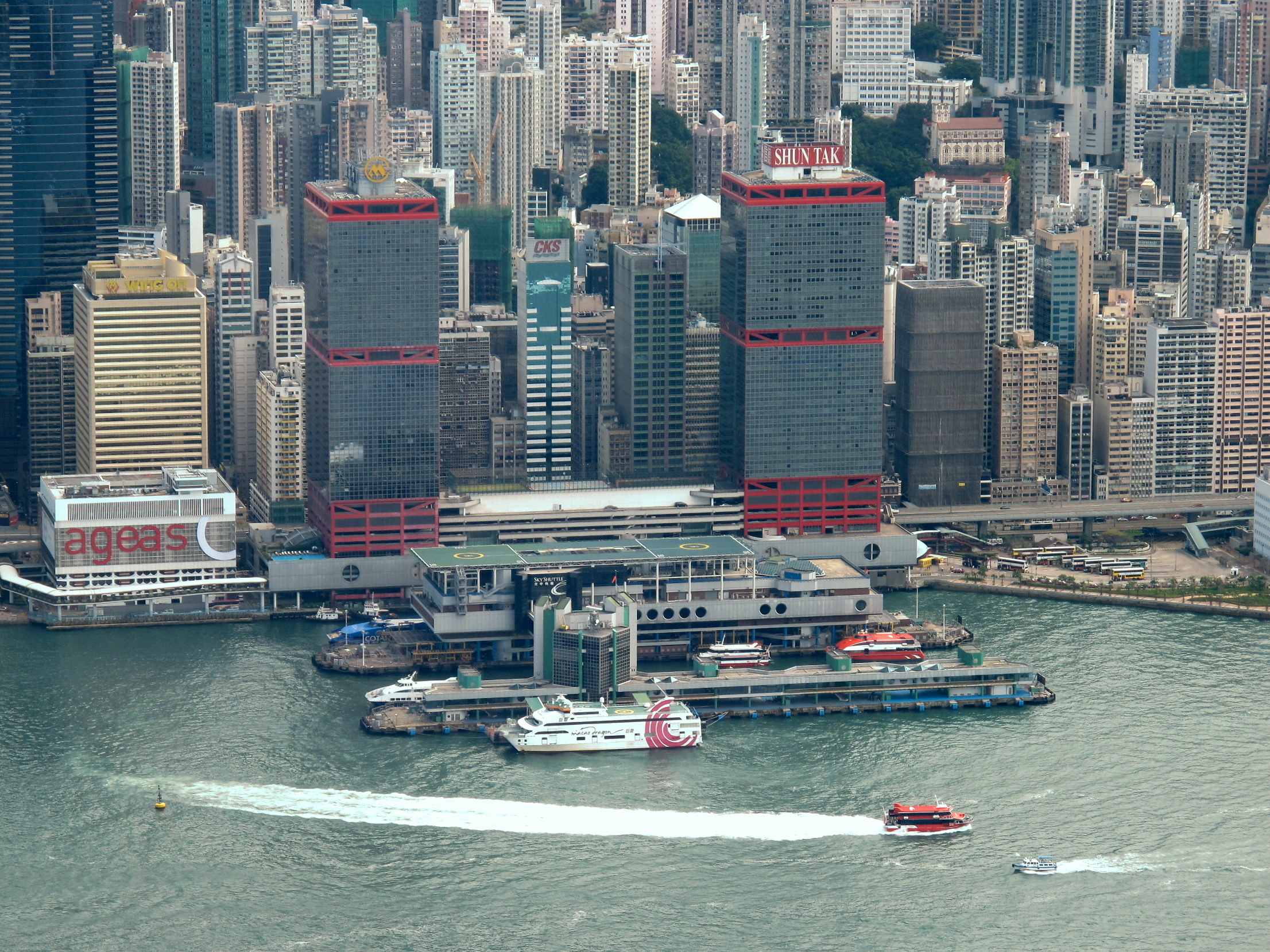
The Hong Kong–Macau Ferry Terminal in Sheung Wan

Sheung Wan (Chinese: 上環; Jyutping: soeng6 waan4) is an area in Hong Kong, located in the north-west of Hong Kong Island, between Central and Sai Ying Pun. Administratively, it is part of the Central and Western District. The name can be variously interpreted as Upper District (occupying relatively high ground compared to Central and Wan Chai), or Gateway District (perhaps a reference to the location where the British first entered and occupied Hong Kong).

== History ==
Sheung Wan was one of the earliest settled places by the British, and belonged to the historical Victoria City. The site of the original occupation of Hong Kong Island by British forces in 1842 was at Possession Street, between Queen's Road Central and Hollywood Road. A plaque to this effect can be found in Hollywood Road Park at the top of Possession Street. The foot of Possession Street, Possession Point, was at that time on the shoreline, but is now several hundred yards inland due to reclamation.

== Geography ==
Sheung Wan is surrounded by Sai Ying Pun in the west, Central in the east, Victoria Harbour in the north and Victoria Peak in the south. Part of the Mid-Levels is located within Sheung Wan. The border between Central and Sheung Wan consists of the entire Castle Lane, the entire Aberdeen Street, the entire Wing Kut Street, the section of Des Voeux Road Central between Wing Kut Street and Wing Wo Street, the section of Wing Wo Street north of Des Voeux Road Central, the section of Connaught Road Central between Wing Wo Street and Rumsey Street, and the section of Rumsey Street from Connaught Road Central to the waterside. Garfield Mansion is in Sheung Wan while Green Field Court is in Central. The border's location south of Seymour Road in the Mid-Levels is unknown.Notable streets in the area include Po Yan Street.

== Features ==
- Asia Art Archive
- Blake Garden
- Hollywood Road Park
- Hong Kong Museum of Medical Sciences
- Man Mo Temple
- Pak Tsz Lane Park
- Sheung Wan Civic Centre
- Sheung Wan Market
- Shun Tak Centre
- Soho, Hong Kong (also part of Central)
- The Center
- Tung Wah Hospital
- Western Market
- YMCA of Hong Kong Bridges Street Centre

=== The Sheung Wan Route ===
The Sheung Wan Route is one part of Central and Western Heritage Trail designed by the Antiquities and Monuments Office and Leisure and Cultural Services Department. The route covers 35 historic buildings and sites in Sheung Wan.

== Streets ==
Streets in Sheung Wan include:

- Aberdeen Street, marking the border with Central
- Bonham Strand and Bonham Strand West
- Bridges Street
- Cleverly Street (Hong Kong) (急庇利街). Named after Charles Saint George Cleverly, the 2nd Surveyor General of Hong Kong Government.
- Des Voeux Road Central and Des Voeux Road West
- Gough Street
- Hillier Street
- Hollywood Road (also in Central)
- Jervois Street
- Ladder Street and other ladder streets
- Man Wa Lane
- Morrison Street (摩利臣街)
- Possession Street
- Pound Lane, a ladder street
- Queen's Road Central and Queen's Road West
- Rumsey Street
- Shing Wong Street, a ladder street
- Tai Ping Shan Street, a popular shopping street
- Upper and Lower Lascar Row
- Wellington Street, Hong Kong (also in Central)
- Wing Lee Street
- Wing Lok Street (Hong Kong) (永樂街)
- Wing Sing Street

== Economy ==
The head office of Wing On is in Wing On Centre (永安中心) in Sheung Wan.

== Education ==
Sheung Wan is in Primary One Admission (POA) School Net 11. Within the school net are multiple aided schools (operated independently but funded with government money) and the following government schools: Bonham Road Government Primary School and Li Sing Primary School (李陞小學).

Another school in the area is Discovery Montessori School, a Montessori-based school located at 3/F Mandarin Building, 43B Bonham Strand, Sheung Wan. Discovery Montessori School (DMS) is for children from 6 months to 6 years old, with programs including playgroup, nursery, and kindergarten.

Due to the high French expatriate population, the French International School of Hong Kong previously operated a Kindergarten campus in Shops 2–4 on the ground floor of Tung Fai Gardens (東暉花園) in Sheung Wan.

== Transport ==
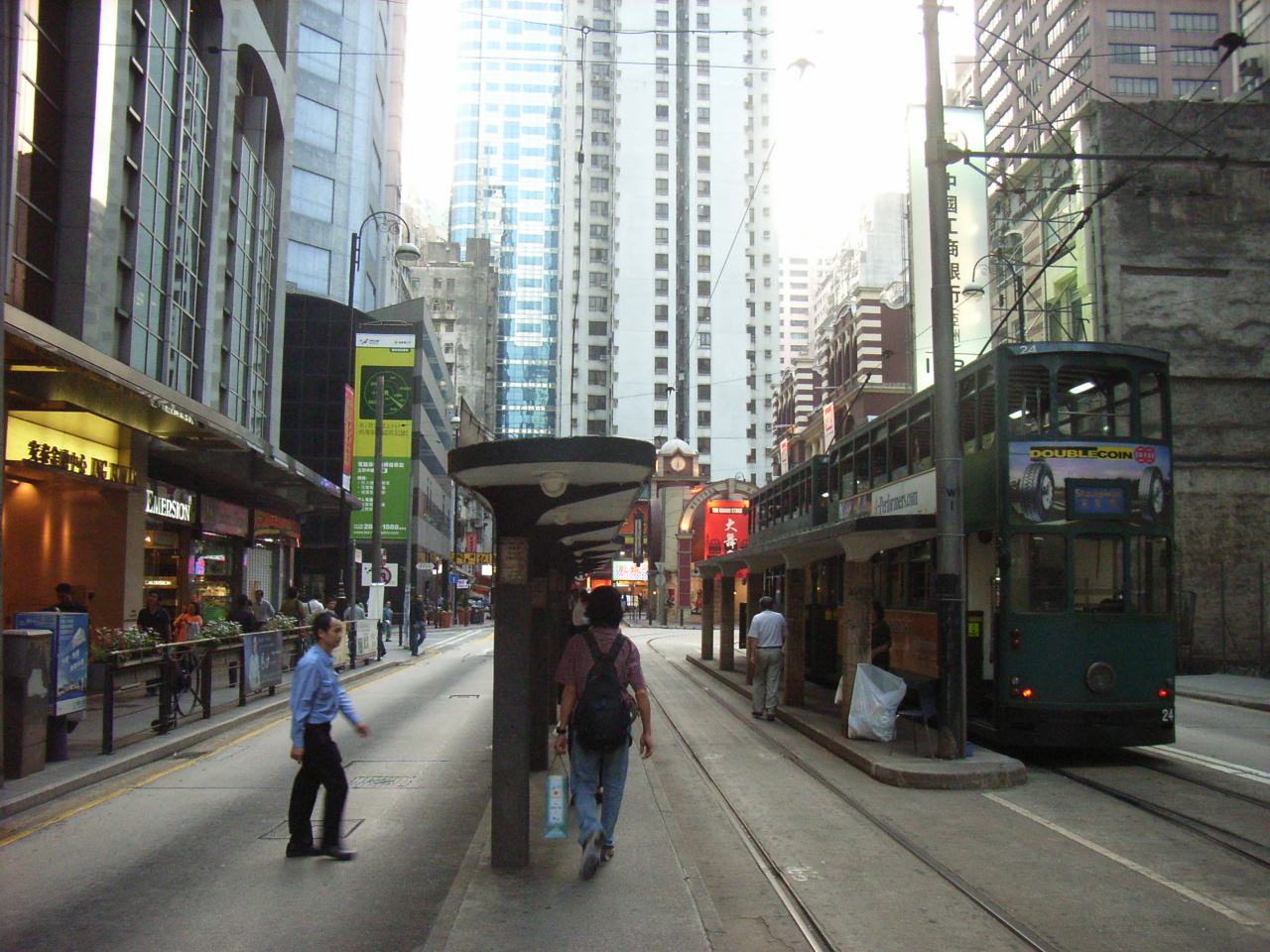
Sheung Wan Tram Terminus

Sheung Wan is served by the Sheung Wan station, formerly the western terminus of the Island line of the MTR metro system. Kennedy Town became the new terminus of the Island on 28 December 2014.

Trams also run through Sheung Wan, and one of the tram termini, Western Market, is located at the junction of Des Voeux Road Central and Morrison Street near its namesake.

The Hong Kong–Macau Ferry Terminal in the Shun Tak Centre has ferries and helicopters to Macau and to several destinations in Mainland China.

Numerous bus routes run through Sheung Wan. Central (Macau Ferry) Bus Terminus, located next to the Hong Kong-Macau Ferry Terminal, is one of the largest bus termini on Hong Kong Island.

== See also ==
- Central and Western Heritage Trail: Sheung Wan Route
- Dr Sun Yat-sen Historical Trail
- List of places in Hong Kong
