= Bonham Strand =

Discontinuous street in Hong Kong

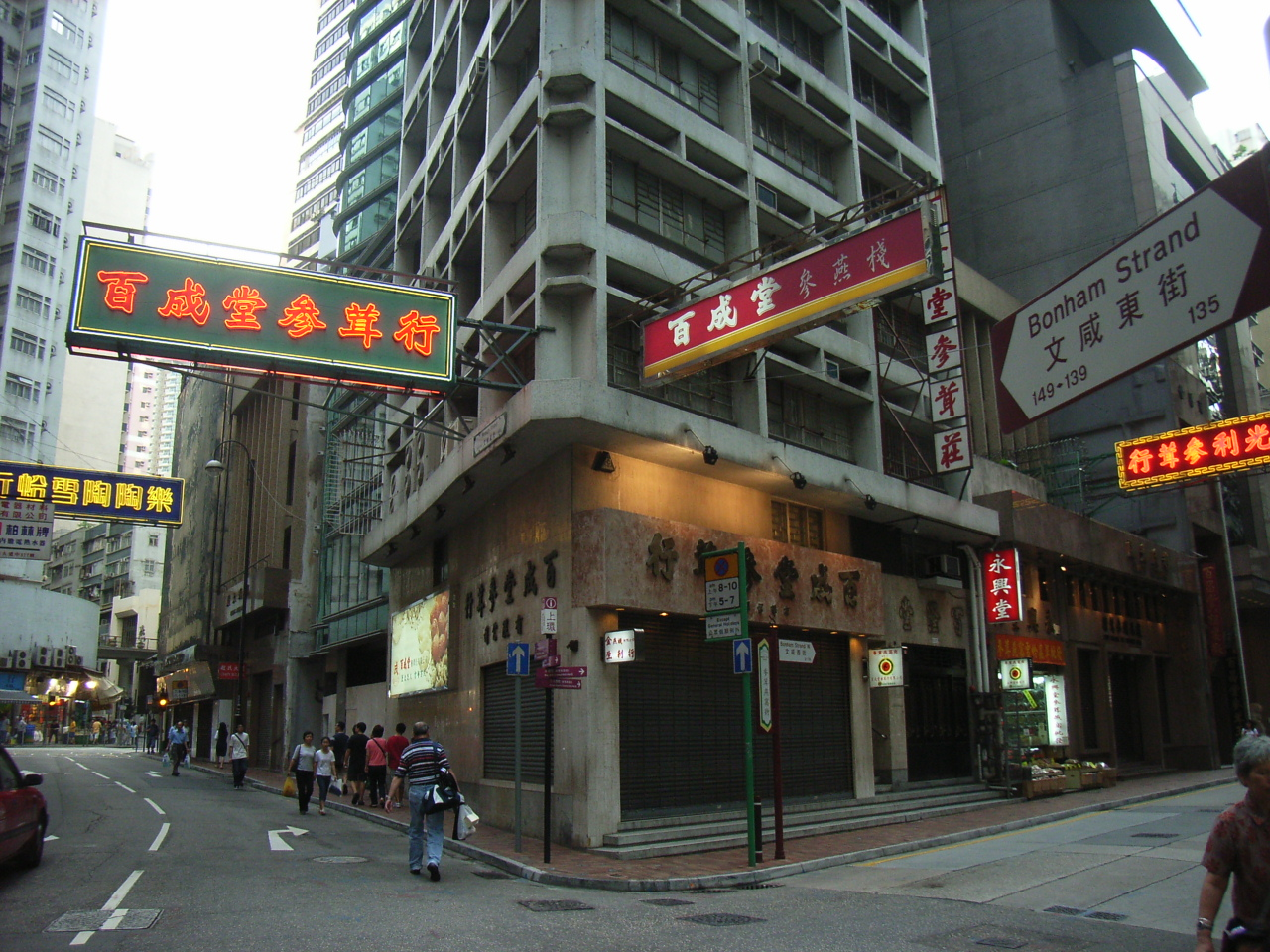
- Bonham Strand in Sheung Wan
- Interactive map of Bonham Strand
- Native name: 文咸街 (Yue Chinese)
- Namesake: Sir George Bonham
- Location: Sheung Wan, Hong Kong
- East end: Queen's Road Central
- West end: Queen's Road / Possession Street; (Bonham Strand); Des Voeux Road West; (Bonham Strand West)

Bonham Strand
- Chinese: 文咸街
Transcriptions
Yue: Cantonese
- Jyutping: man4 haam4 gaai1

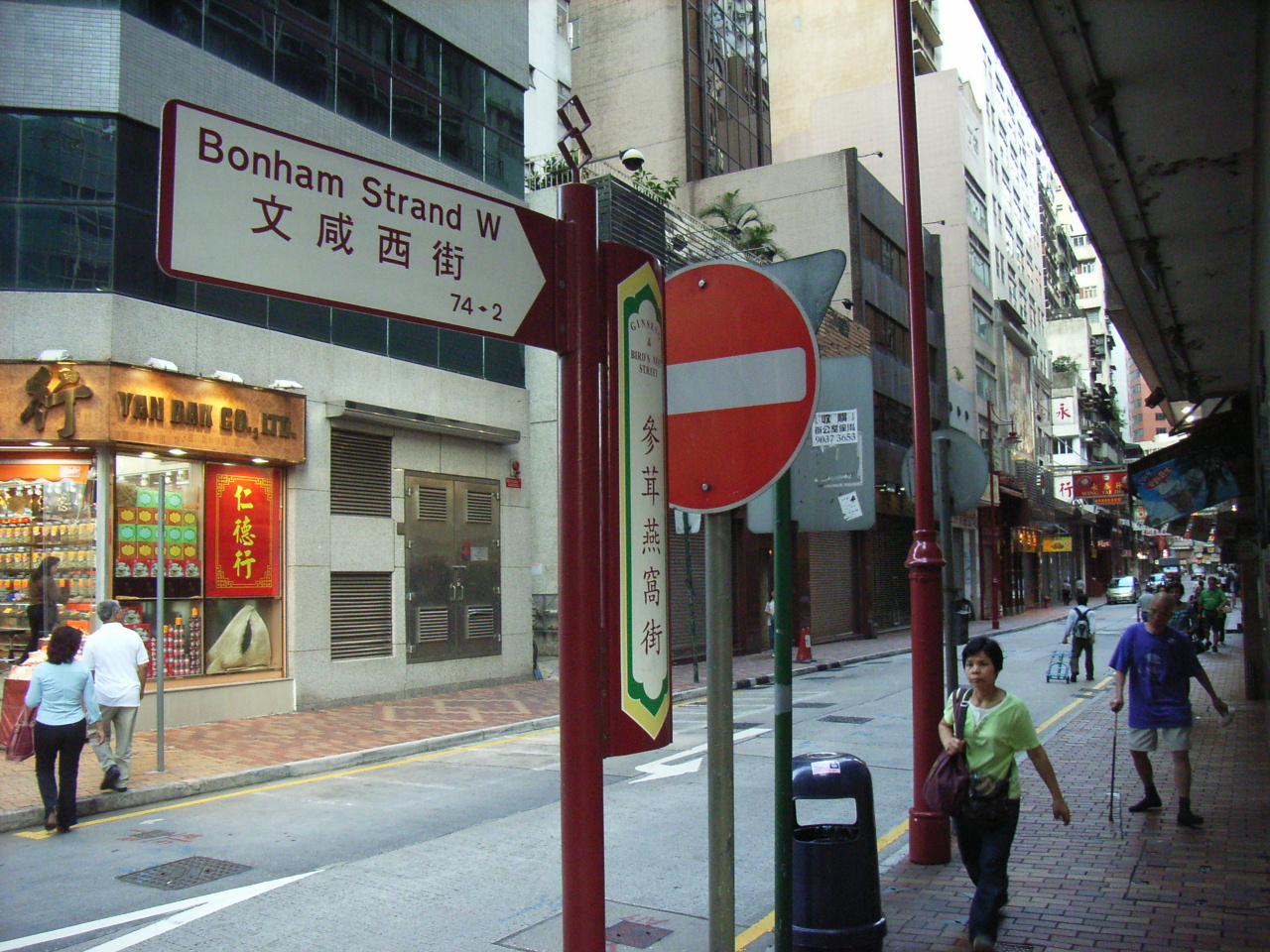
Bonham Strand West

Bonham Strand (Chinese: 文咸街; Jyutping: man4 haam4 gaai1) is a combination of two streets in Sheung Wan, Hong Kong: Bonham Strand (文咸東街) and Bonham Strand West (文咸西街).

As the name suggests, it was originally a strand – and therefore close to shore – but is currently far from the seafront, following several reclamations over time.

The streets are named after Sir George Bonham, the third governor of Hong Kong (1848–1854), who led the reconstruction effort of Sheung Wan after a fire destroyed part of it in 1851. This was the government's first large-scale reclamation and road construction project.

== Bonham Strand ==
Bonham Strand (文咸東街) starts at Queen's Road Central near Cosco Tower, with several junctions with Jervois Street, Mercer Street, Hillier Street, Clevery Street, Morris Street and Wing Lok Street, before returning to another section of Queen's Road Central in Possession Point.

The street is comparatively low to the surrounding area, and is prone to flooding during heavy rainfall.

The street is sometimes mistakenly written as Bonham Strand East after its Chinese name. The directory board in Sheung Wan MTR station is illustrative of the mistake.

== Bonham Strand West ==
Bonham Strand West (文咸西街) begins at Bonham Strand, and ends in Des Voeux Road West.

Its geodetic co-ordinates are 22°17′14″N 114°08′54″E.

== See also ==
- List of streets and roads in Hong Kong
