= Possession Street =

Street in Sheung Wan, Hong Kong

Coordinates: 22.2862°N 114.1486°E

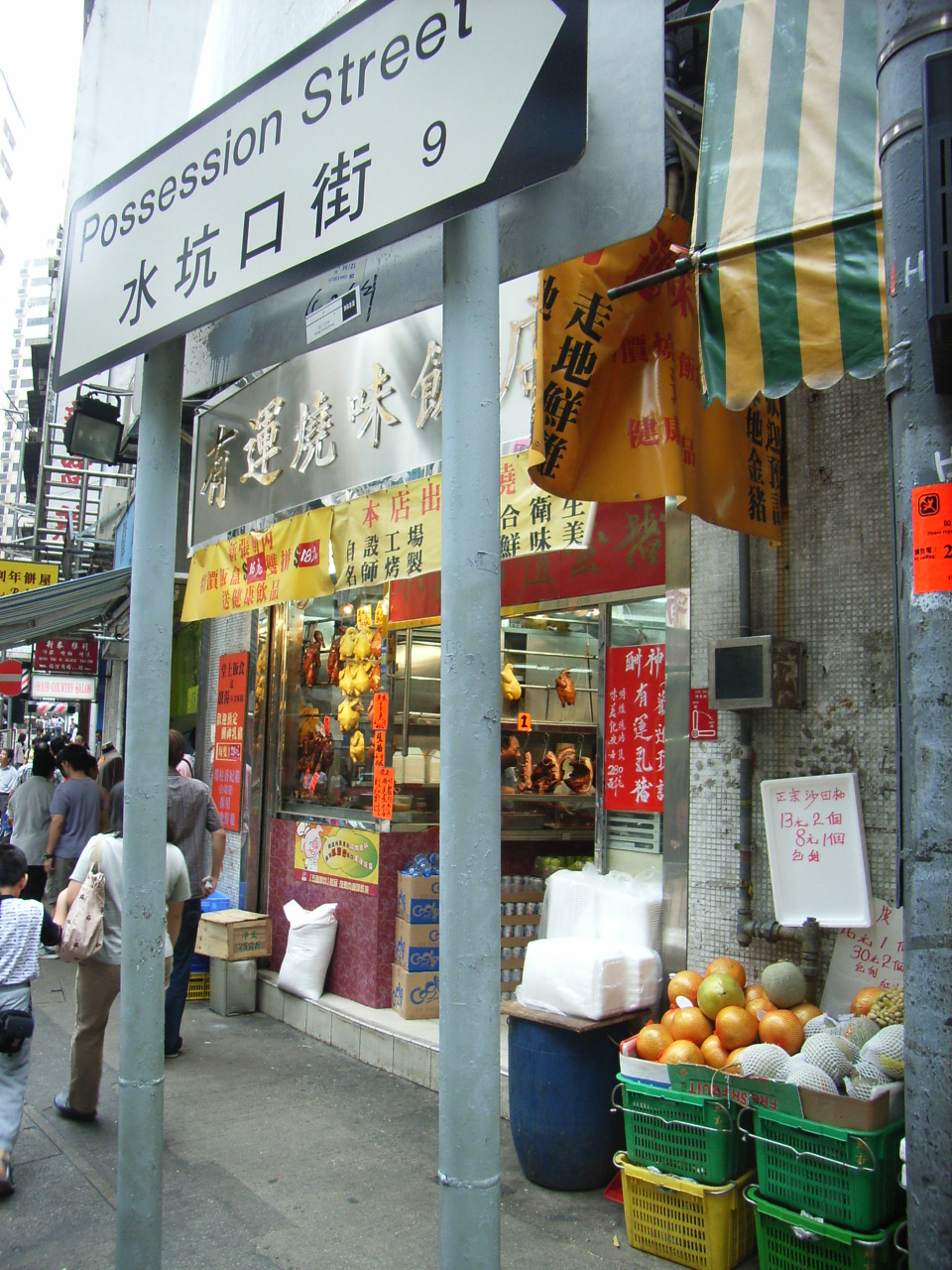
The crossing point of Possession Street and Queen's Road Central

Possession Street (水坑口街; seoi2 haang1 hau2 gaai1) is a street in Sheung Wan, from Queen's Road West to Hollywood Road, on Hong Kong Island, Hong Kong. The street marks the boundary of Queen's Road West and Queen's Road Central.

== Name ==
The original Chinese name was 波些臣街 (Po Se Son Kai), based on the pronunciation of English name. It was later renamed to 水坑口街 (Sui Hang Hou Kai) after a nullah beside.

== History ==
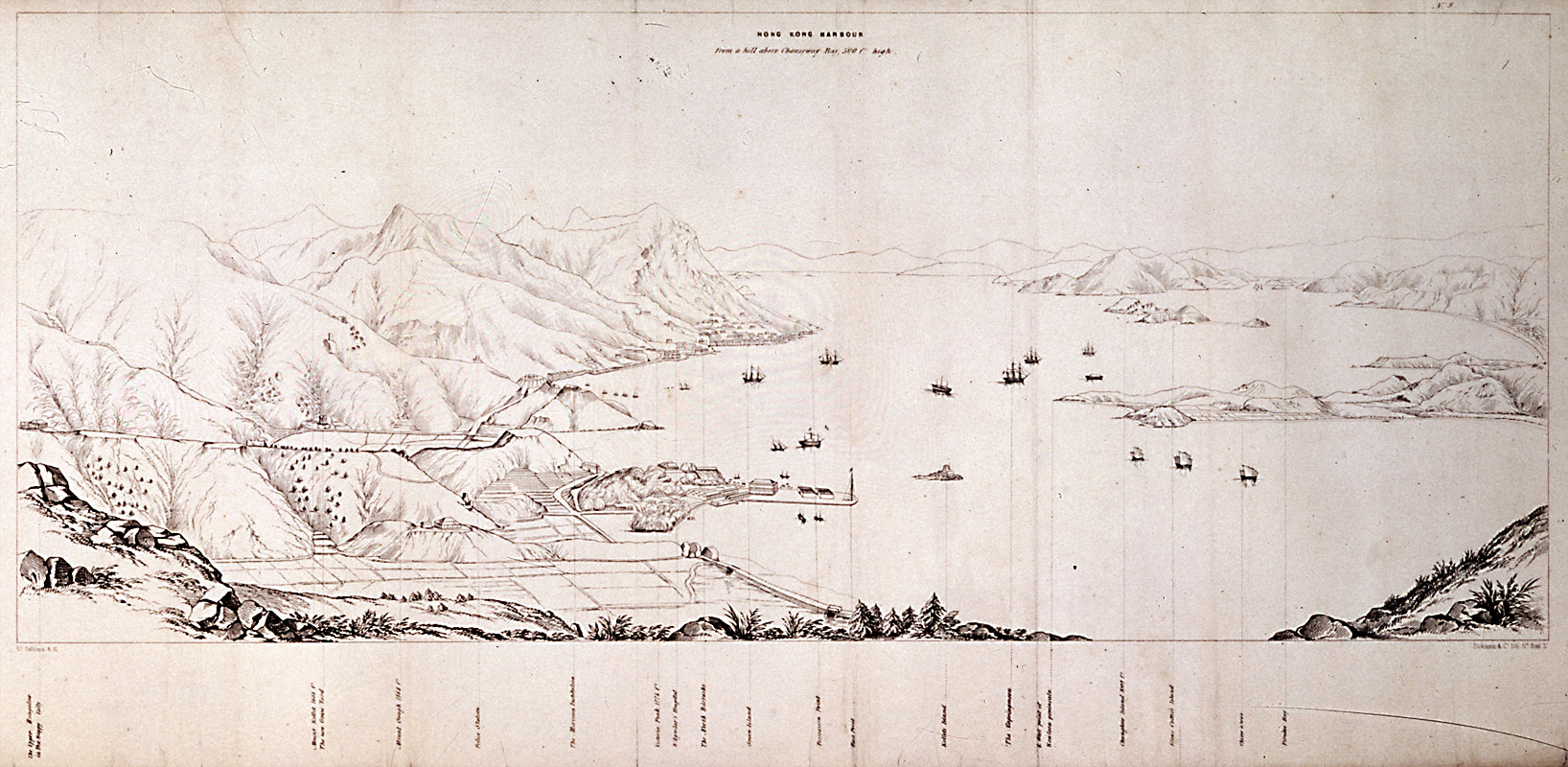
An 1845 map of Hong Kong Harbour, showing Possession Point near the centre

The area was the site of Possession Point, a former point of land on the northwestern coast of Hong Kong, before land reclamation moved the spot further inland. The area is where Commodore Gordon Bremer, commander-in-chief of British forces in China, took formal possession of Hong Kong on 26 January 1841, and this date is considered as the founding of Hong Kong.

Captain Edward Belcher, who surveyed the island in 1841, wrote: "We landed on Monday, the 25th, 1841, at fifteen minutes past eight A. M., and being the bona fide first possessors, Her Majesty's health was drank with three cheers on Possession Mount." Accompanied by officers of the naval squadron the next day, Bremer took formal possession, under a feu de joie from the Royal Marines and a royal salute from the men-of-war ships. The hoisting of the Union Jack was possibly done by either William Dowell, who was a midshipman during the ceremony, or Mohammed Arab, who served in either the Bengal Volunteers or 37th Madras Native Infantry.

The area was kept as an open space, and used for recreation by the local Chinese, who called it Tai Tat Tei (大笪地). It was developed in the 1980s and formed into a hotel and commercial complex, which is also the site of the Hong Kong–Macau Ferry Terminal.

The point has now disappeared from the coastline, but Possession Street and the sudden turn of Queen's Road West reveal its original location. In maps of the 1980s and before, Hollywood Road Park is marked as Possession Point.

At the end of the 19th century, the street was full of brothels, until 1903, when they were relocated to Shek Tong Tsui and the premises was replaced with housing. It resulted in the golden period of Shek Tong Tsui, tong sai fung yuet (塘西風月), where wealthy Chinese merchants gathered.

== See also ==
- List of streets and roads in Hong Kong
- History of Hong Kong (1800s–1930s)
- West Point, Hong Kong
- Flagstaff Hill, Tai Po
