= Queen's Road, Hong Kong =

Series of roads in Hong Kong Island, Hong Kong

Queen's Road
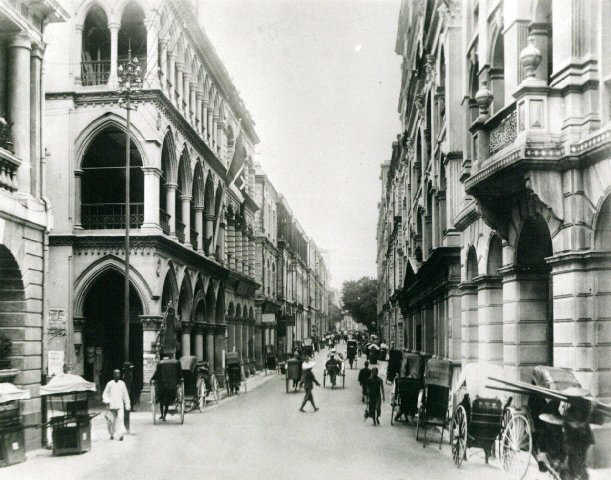
- Queen's Road Central at the junction of Duddell Street, ca. 1900
- Interactive map of Queen's Road
- Native name: 皇后大道 (Yue Chinese)
- Location: Victoria, Hong Kong Island, Hong Kong
- Coordinates: 22°16′51″N 114°09′22″E

Construction
- Construction start: 1841; 185 years ago
- Completed: 1843; 183 years ago

Queen's Road, Hong Kong
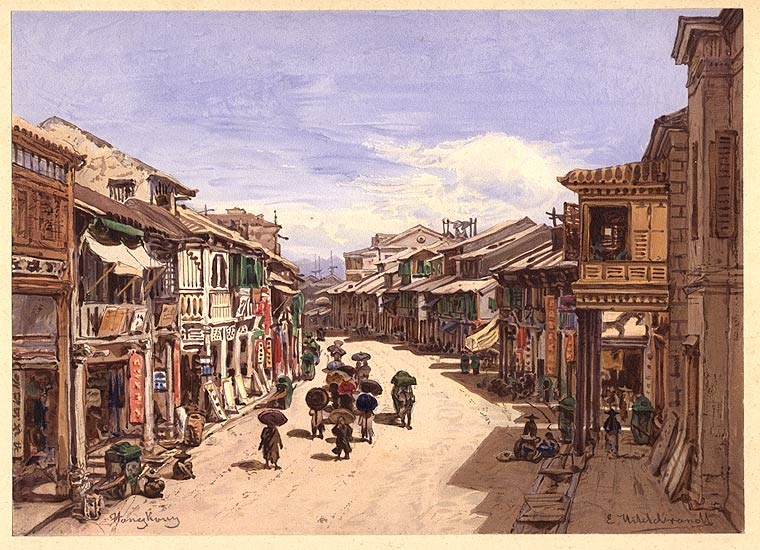
- A painting of Queen's Road Central in 1865
- Chinese: 皇后大道
Transcriptions
Yue: Cantonese
- Yale Romanization: wong4 hau6 daai6 dou6

Queen's Road is a collection of roads along the northern coast of Hong Kong Island within the limits of Victoria City. It was the first road to be constructed in the colony. Constructed by the British between 1841 and 1843, it spans across Victoria City from Shek Tong Tsui to Wan Chai.

At various points along the route, Queen's Road marks the original shoreline before land reclamation projects permanently extended land into Victoria Harbour.

The four sections of the roads are (from west to east): Queen's Road West (Chinese: 皇后大道西; Jyutping: wong4 hau6 daai6 dou6 sai1), Queen's Road Central (皇后大道中; wong4 hau6 daai6 dou6 zung1), Queensway (金鐘道; gam1 zung1 dou6), and Queen's Road East (皇后大道東; wong4 hau6 daai6 dou6 dung1).

== History ==
The road was originally 4 miles (6.5 km) long. The Royal Engineers built the first section to Sai Ying Pun with the help of 300 coolies from Kowloon (Hong Kong), then a territory of China. This section of Queen's Road ran parallel to the beach where Sir Henry Pottinger set up his tent in 1842. Originally named Main Street, it was officially renamed Queen's Road in March 1842 after Queen Victoria of the British Empire. It was mistakenly translated into Chinese as 皇后, meaning queen consort, rather than queen regnant (女皇).

When Hong Kong was founded as a British Crown Colony in 1842, Queen's Road was the hub of the island's activity. The development of the island during this period had been haphazard: winding paths connected the Hong Kong Club for tai-pans, and ran past taverns, squatter huts, and military encampments. The first governors built their homes along Queen's Road; subsequently, the first post office and Christian churches soon arrived. Instead of a properly paved road, newcomers to Hong Kong beheld Queen's Road as a rugged dirt road which was prone to dust clouds and puddles of mud.

=== The Great Fire of Hong Kong 1878 ===
On Christmas Day 1878, a fire broke out and destroyed a large area of the slums along Queen's Road. An eyewitness account was recorded by Constance Gordon-Cumming in her 1886 book Wanderings in China. The fire raged for 17 hours, and burnt down 400 houses across a 10 acres (4.0 ha) area. Thousands of residents were left homeless. Nevertheless, the devastated ruins were recycled for reclamation adjacent to the area (modern-day Bonham Strand).

After the Great Fire of 1878, Queen's Road became the site of some of Hong Kong's most expensive land, and notable buildings.

== Roads ==
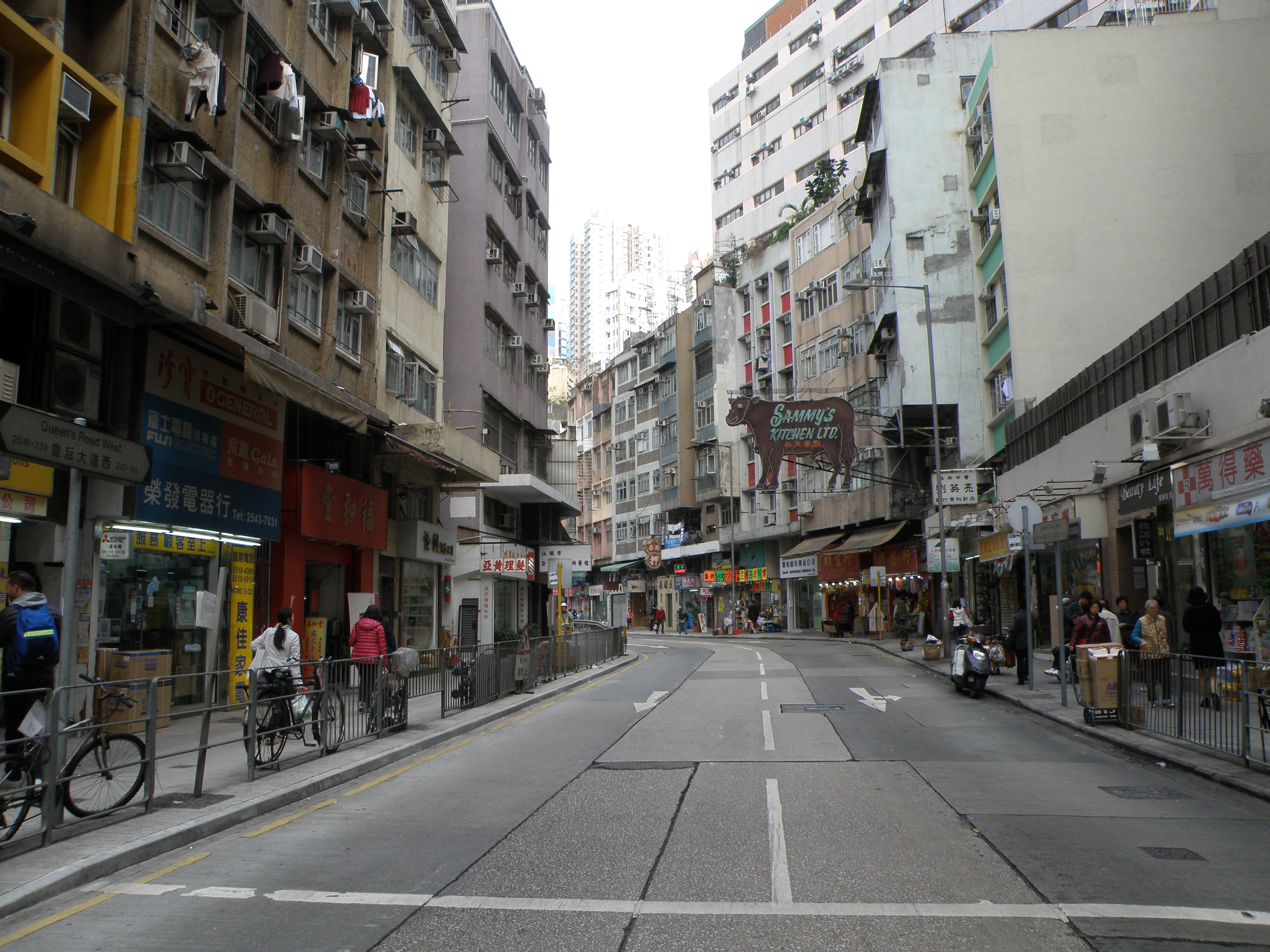
Queen's Road West near Sai Ying Pun

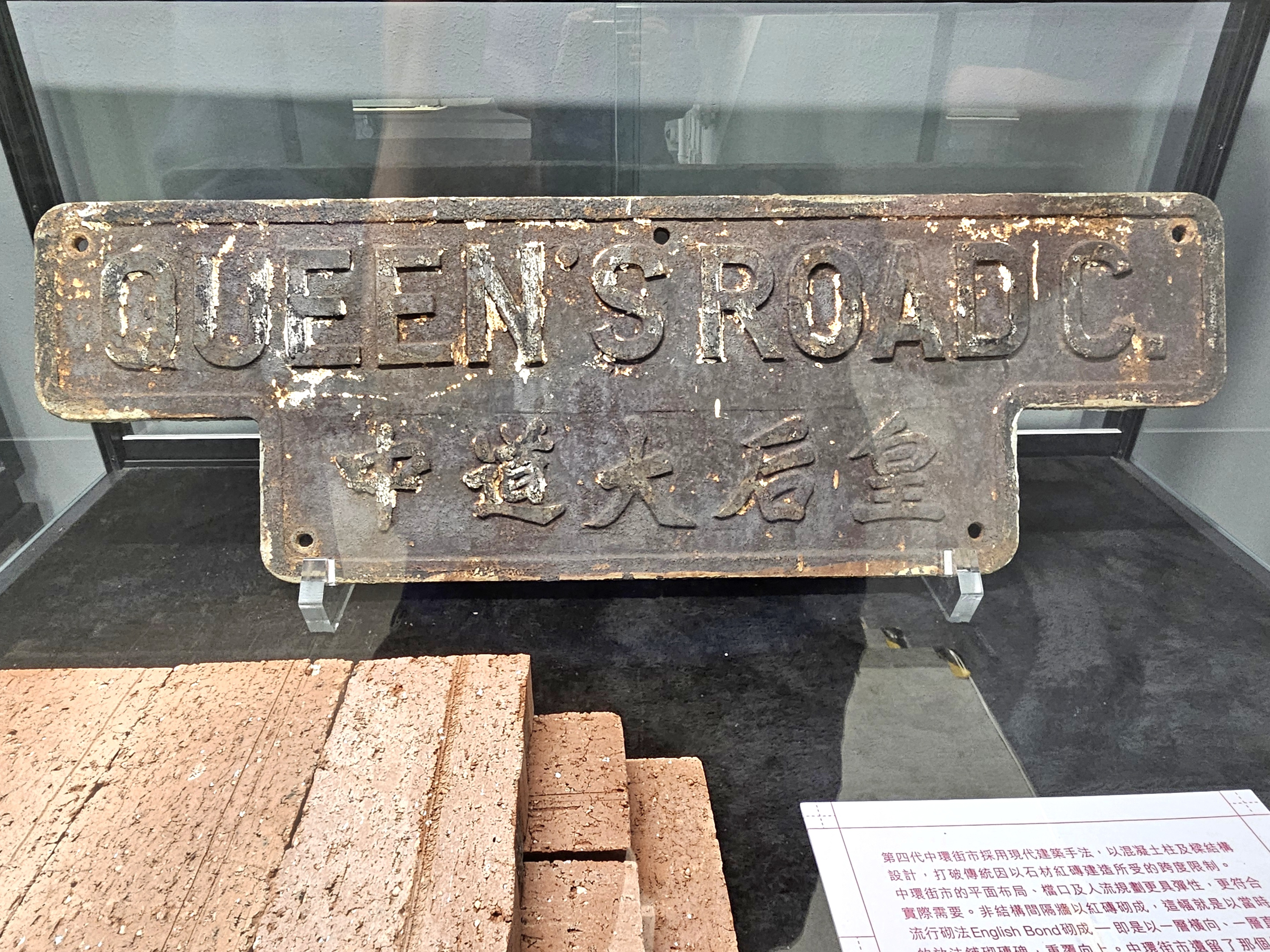
T-shaped street nameplate for Queen's Road Central on display inside Central Market.

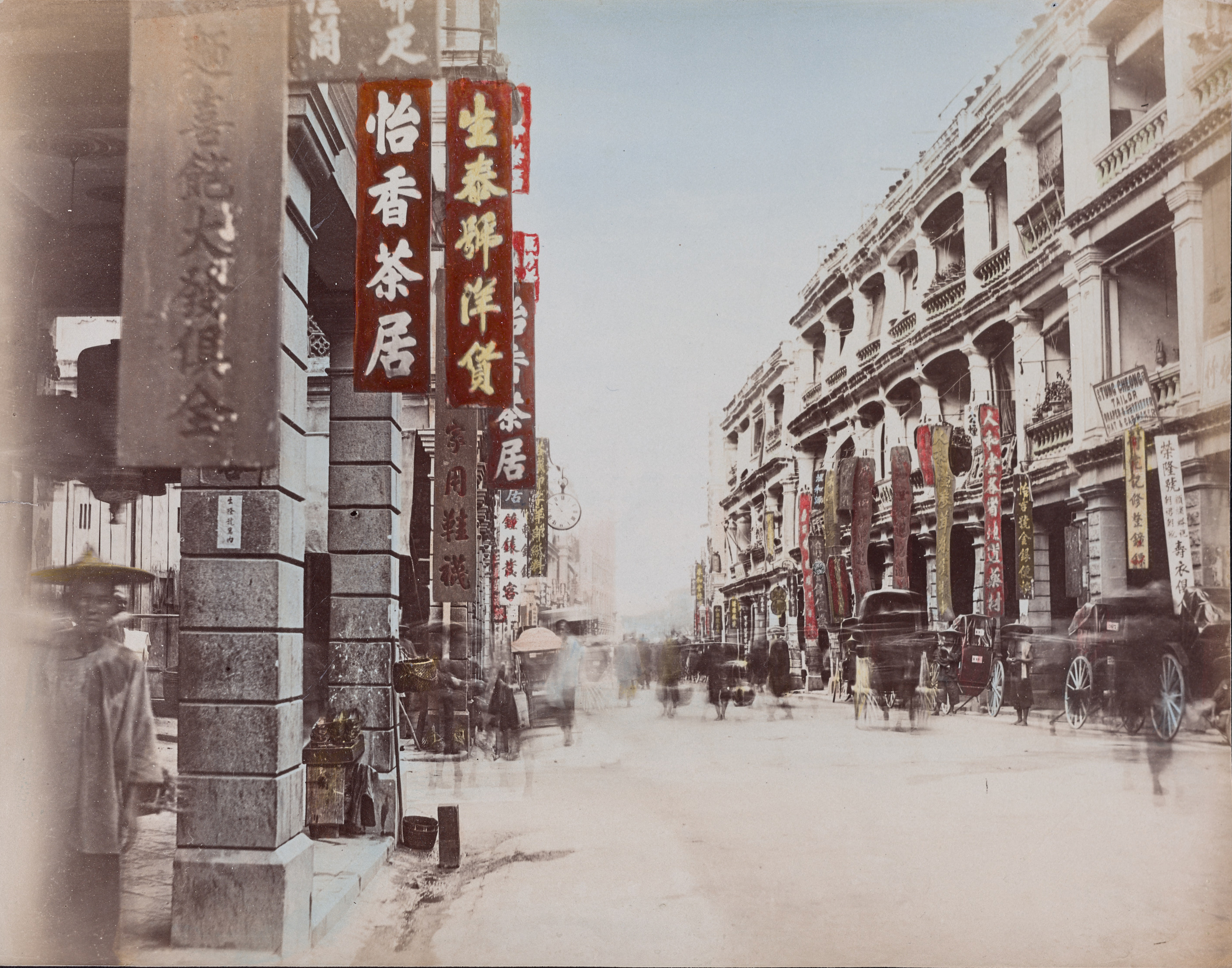
Queen's Road Central in the late 19th century.

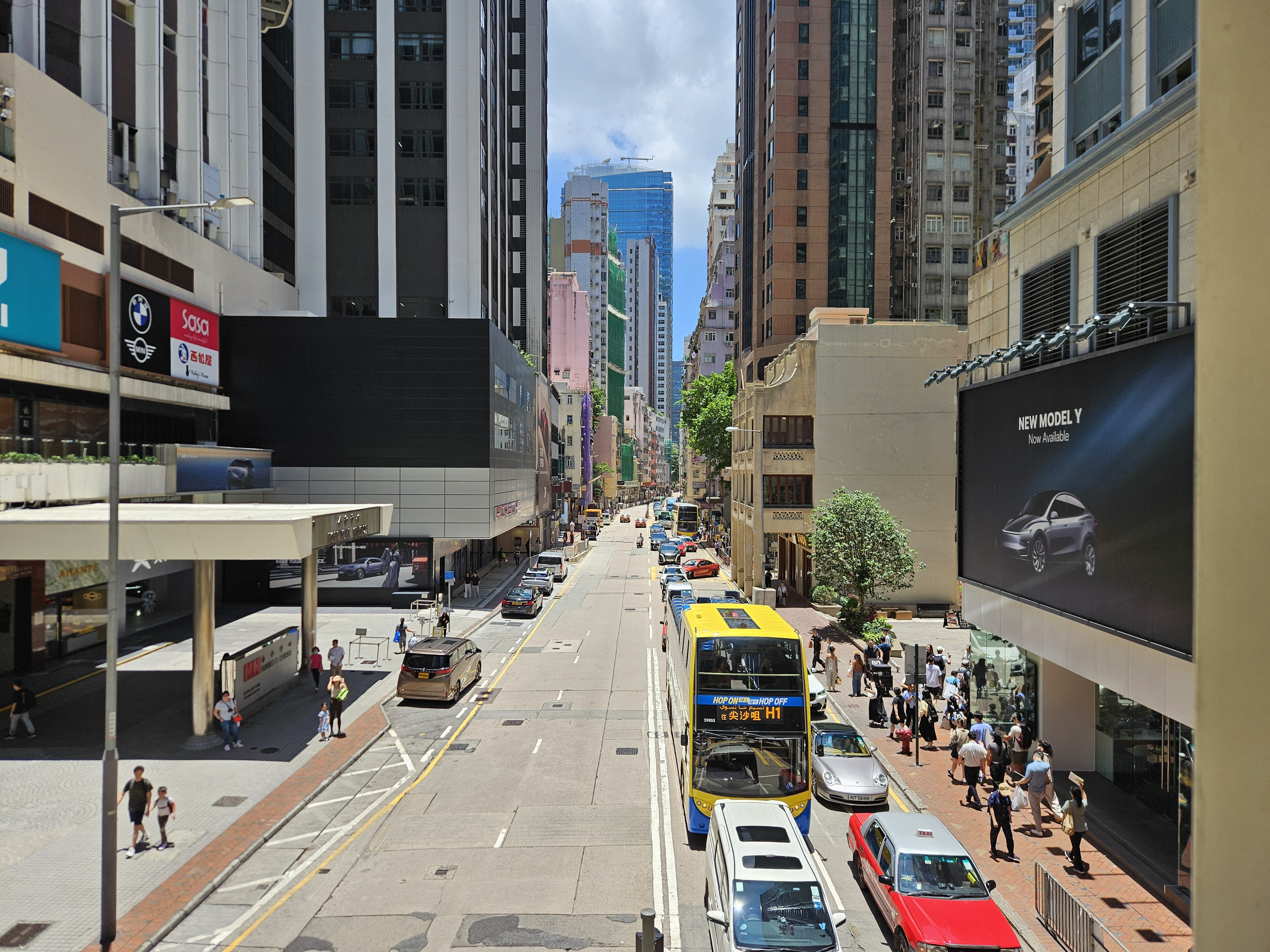
Queen's Road East Wan Chai Section. Hopewell Centre on the left.

=== Queen's Road West ===
Queen's Road West (皇后大道西) runs from Sheung Wan to Shek Tong Tsui. It begins in Sheung Wan at the junction with Possession Street, and ends where it meets the coastal road, Praya in Kennedy Town.

=== Queen's Road Central ===
Queen's Road Central (皇后大道中) runs from Central to Sheung Wan. It was one of the first roads (alongside Hollywood Road) to be built by the British. The road became a vital asset to Queen's Town (later renamed the City of Victoria).

Queen's Road Central intersects with the similarly named Queen Victoria Street – a short street perpendicular to the road which terminates at the junction with Connaught Road, opposite the International Finance Centre.

At the western end of Queen's Road Central, the road becomes Queen's Road West. At the eastern end, it merges with Des Voeux Road Central to become Queensway at the junction of Garden Road.

When Hong Kong was occupied by the Japanese Empire from 1942 to 1945, Queen's Road Central was briefly renamed Meiji-dori, after Emperor Meiji, by the Japanese occupation government.

=== Queensway ===
Queensway (金鐘道) was originally the westernmost section of Queen's Road East. After the development of Admiralty as a business district next to Central, this section was renamed Queensway in 1967. It links Queen's Road Central to Queen's Road East and Hennessy Road.

=== Queen's Road East ===
Queen's Road East (皇后大道東) runs between Wan Chai and Happy Valley. At the western end, Queen's Road East starts at a fork junction with Queensway and Hennessy Road near Justice Drive. Although situated inland, and south of five trunk routes (Gloucester Road, Jaffe Road, Lockhart Road, Hennessy Road and Johnston Road), from Victoria Harbour, Queen's Road East runs along the old, original shoreline of Hong Kong Island.

== In popular culture ==
In 1991, the Taiwanese singer-songwriter Lo Ta-yu released a song titled "Queen's Road East". Its lyrics, which were written by Lin Xi, reference the different sections of Queen's Road, and their potential renaming to express the anxiety felt by the city's residents over the impending handover of Hong Kong in 1997.

In the 1941 film noir movie, The Maltese Falcon, Humphrey Bogart's character (Sam Spade) looks into Mary Astor's character's (Brigid O' Shaughnessy) hat, and finds a label which reads: "Lucille Shop – Queen's Road C Hong Kong".

== See also ==
- List of places named after Queen Victoria
- List of streets and roads in Hong Kong
