= Chau Siu-ki =

Hong Kong businessman (1863–1925)

Unofficial Member of the Legislative Council of Hong Kong
- In office 28 April 1921 – 30 April 1921 (acting)
- Appointed by: Sir R. E. Stubbs
- Preceded by: Ho Fook
- Succeeded by: Ho Fook
- In office 31 May 1923 – 4 October 1923 (acting)
- Appointed by: Sir R. E. Stubbs
- Preceded by: Ng Hon-tsz
- Succeeded by: R. H. Kotewall
- In office 5 March 1924 – 28 August 1924 (acting)
- Appointed by: Sir R. E. Stubbs
- Preceded by: Chow Shou-son
- Succeeded by: Chow Shou-son

Personal details
- Born: 1863 British Hong Kong
- Died: 17 July 1925 (aged 62) British Hong Kong
- Children: Chau Tsun-nin
- Education: Government Central School
- Occupation: Businessman

Chau Siu-ki, JP (1863 – 17 July 1925) was a Hong Kong insurance and shipping magnate, real estate developer and member of the Legislative Council of Hong Kong.

== Business career ==
Chau Siu-ki was a Hong Kong born British subject born in 1863 and was educated at the old Government Central School (today's Queen's College) under the headmastership of Dr. Frederick Stewart. He graduated from the school at age 19 and entered the Wootton and Deacon law firm.

He became a correspondence clerk at the Government Civil Hospital after obtaining the highest place in a competitive examination. He was promoted to correspondence clerk for the Harbour Department a year later where he learned about shipping matters. He remained there for eight years.

He later left the government for the post of an English-speaking secretary for the Man on Insurance Company where he later became a manager and was also hired as secretary of the Chun on Fire Insurance Company. In due time, Chau also established and became director of the Hong Kong and Kowloon Loan and Land Company and the Yuen On and Shiu On Shipping Companies. He was also the managing partner of Tai Sun Bank.

== Public services ==
He was twice chairman of the Tung Wah Hospital and a member of the advisory board of that Chinese charity institution. He was also a member of the District Watchmen Committee, permanent committee of the Po Leung Kuk and the Fire and Marine Associations of Hong Kong. He also served on Flood Relief, the War Charities Committee and other committees many times.

Chau was appointed a Justice of the Peace. He declined the Governor's appointment of the membership of the Sanitary Board in 1909 as he felt the public office would encroach on his commercial affairs at that time. Nonetheless, he helped forming the Police Reserve during the First World War and was a member of the Chinese Committee of that body. Chau also acted as an unofficial member of the Legislative Council on several occasions. He acted on the Legislative Council after Ng Hon-tsz died in office in 1923 and later resigned and was replaced by R. H. Kotewall.

Chau Siu-ki was a close friend to Cecil Clementi who lived at Chau's houses at Po Hing Fong as a tenant during his civil service in Hong Kong. Chau lived at the house next to Clementi's and Chau would come round to see Clementi and had talks together. Cecil Clementi returned to Hong Kong as governor twelve years later in 1925.

== Education affairs ==
Chau took a particularly keen interest in education matters. He was a benefactor of the St. Stephen College and an active member of the Building Committee for the new school building. Just a week or two before he died, he and Principal Rev. W. H. Hewitt were busy collecting money for the new school. Chau was referred to as persuasive in getting money for worthy objects. He was succeeded by his son Chau Tsun-nin after he died. The College Council also set up a preparatory school later was transformed into the St. Stephen's Girls' College.

Chau Siu-ki gave advice to the staff and the students of the college for the school to prevent a student strike during the Canton-Hong Kong strike broke out in June 1925.

When the University of Hong Kong was started, he and Ho Kai, Ts'o Seen-wan and other leaders of the Chinese community donated HK$10,000 a year for five years to establish an Arts faculty. He was appointed a member of the Court of the university.

He was also the founder of the Siu Ki Free Schools in Tung Kun where his family was originally from.

== Death ==
Chau Siu-ki was killed in the Po Hing Fong flood disaster on 17 July 1925 at the age of 62 when his houses collapsed. Shortly before 9 a.m. on 17 July an extensive wall behind the houses near the Caine Road-Ladder Street end was undermined by the heavy rains of the past three days. The flood gave out and swept away seven houses where thirty families inhabited. Chau Siu-ki died a few minutes after removal to the Tung Wah Hospital.

Chau So She, wife of Chau Siu-ki's son Chau Tsun-nin, Chau Hui She, wife of his another son Chau Chak-nin, his another son Chau Kit-nin and his wife, Chau Siu-ki's third and fourth concubines and his aged mothers were also killed in the disaster. Chau Tsun-nin survived the disaster and was rescued from the wreckage.

The funeral took place on 30 July afternoon. Headed by the band of the Confucius Association, the coffin was moved from the Tung Wah Hospital to the Yat Pit Ting farewell pavilion in Kennedy Town. The detachments from the special police and special firemen followed and escorted by the band of the East Surrey Regiment playing Dead March in Saul from Whitty Street. The funeral was attended by Governor R. E. Stubbs, governmental officials and members of the Legislative Council.

Chau's portrait was unveiled at St. Stephen College by Governor Cecil Clementi and a tribute was paid at a ceremony on 3 December 1925. Legislative Council members and staff of the college were also present.

Legislative Council of Hong Kong
Preceded by Ho Fook	Chinese Unofficial Member; 1921	Succeeded by Ho Fook
Preceded by Ng Hon-tsz	Chinese Unofficial Member; 1923	Succeeded by Robert Hormus Kotewall
Preceded by Chow Shou-son	Chinese Unofficial Member; 1924	Succeeded by Chow Shou-son
