= Helen Liang Memorial Secondary School (Shatin) =

School in Sha Tin, Hong Kong

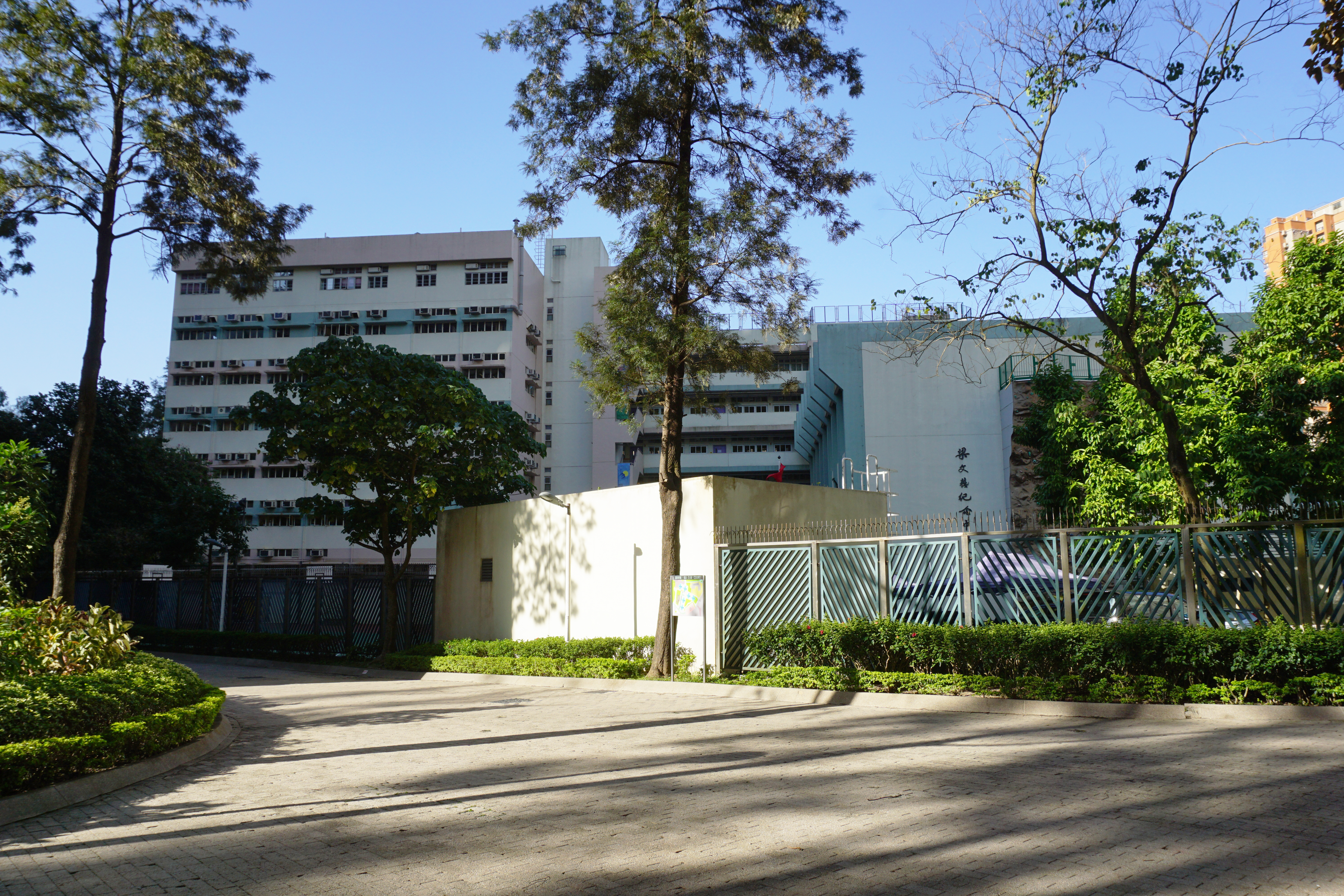

Location
- Sha Tin, the New Territories, Hong Kong
- Coordinates: 22°21′42″N 114°10′26″E

Information
- Type: Government school
- Motto: Eruditio Et Commentatio (博學慎思)
- Founded: 1961 (Primary School) 1977 (Sheung Wan) 1988 (Sha Tin)
- Principal: Mr. Chow Shau-on (周守安)

Helen Liang Memorial Secondary School
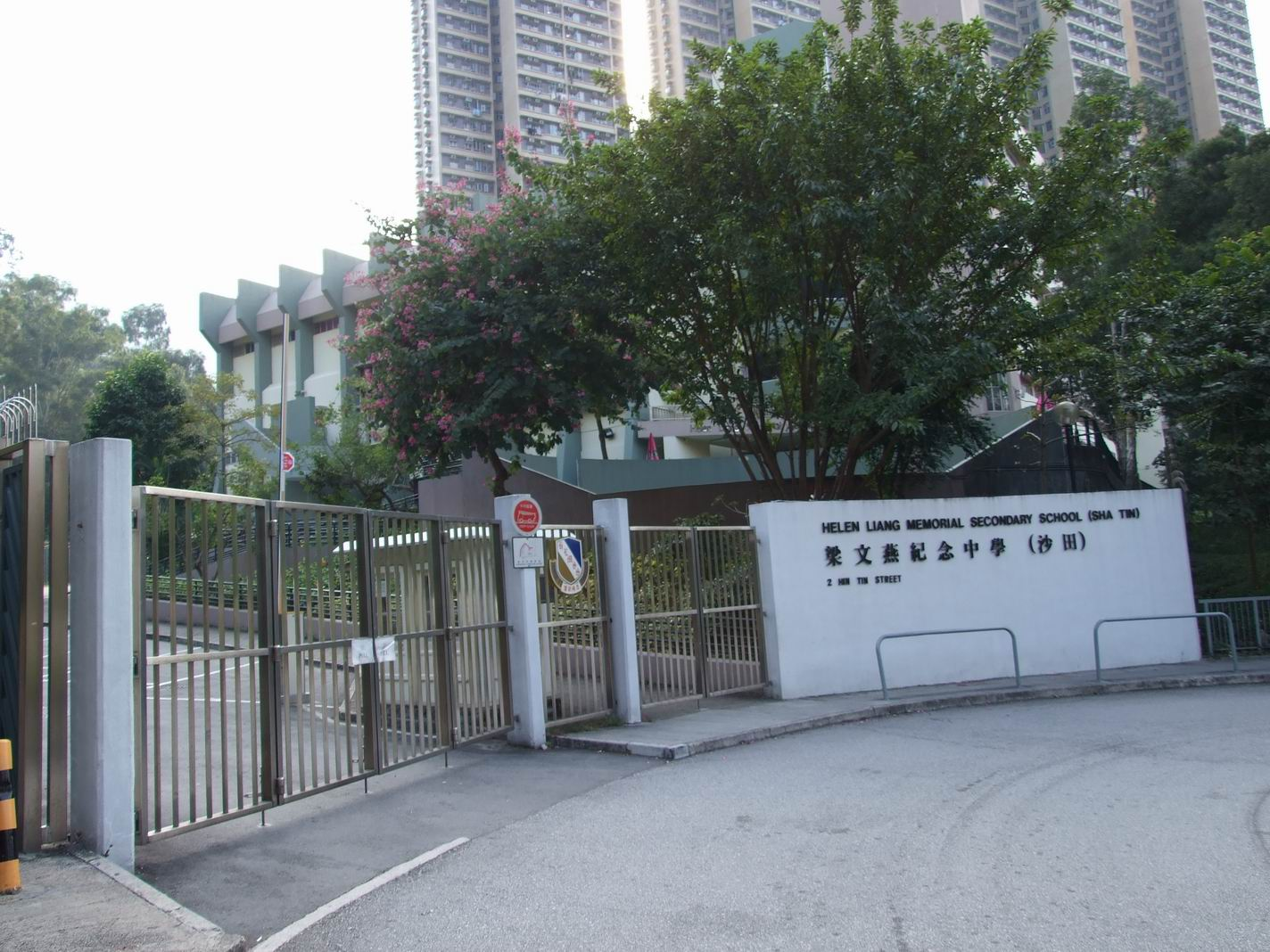
- Helen Liang Memorial Secondary School (Shatin)
- Traditional Chinese: 梁文燕紀念中學(沙田)
- Simplified Chinese: 梁文燕纪念中学(沙田)
Transcriptions
Standard Mandarin
- Hanyu Pinyin: Liáng Wényàn Jìniàn Zhōngxué (Shātián)
Yue: Cantonese
- Jyutping: loeng4 man4 jin3 gei2 nim6 zung1 hok6 (saa1 tin4)

Helen Liang Memorial Secondary School (Shatin) (HLMSS, Chinese: 梁文燕紀念中學(沙田)) is a secondary school in Sha Tin, Hong Kong. The primary school division was founded in 1961, while the secondary school division was founded in 1977 and relocated to the current site of Sha Tin in 1988.

== History ==
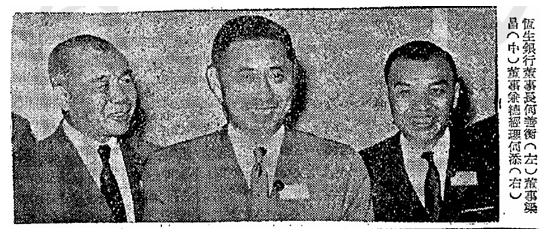
YC Liang (center), Ho Sin Hang (left) and Ho Tim (right) (Wah Kiu Yat Po, 1962-9-4)

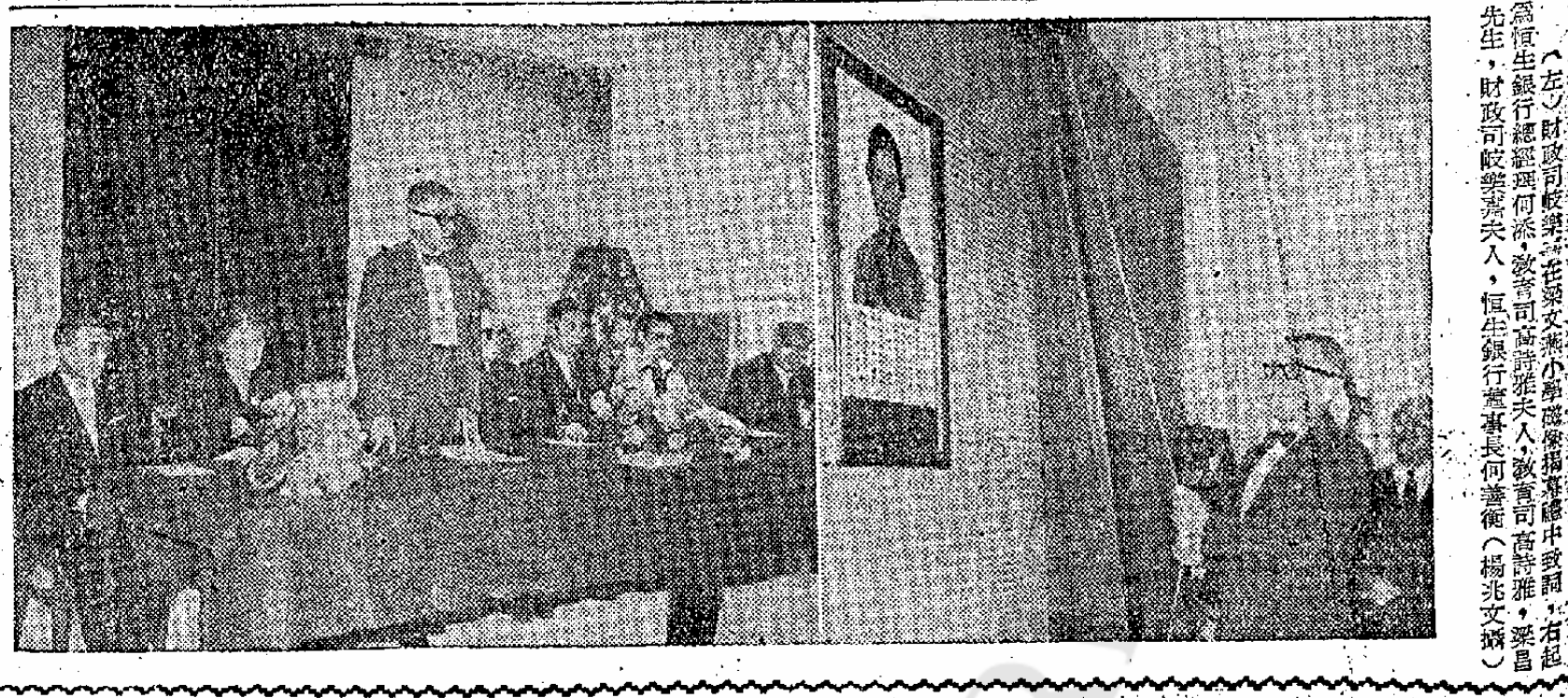
The opening ceremony of the school in 1961 by the then Financial Secretary Arthur Grenfell Clarke.

YC Liang was a businessman in British Hong Kong and Portuguese Macau. During World War II, he was an anti-Japanese intelligence agent in the British Army Aid Group (BAAG). After the war, he founded Yin Cheong Co., Ltd. with his wife, Helen Liang (whose Chinese name contains the word Yin), and they had 5 sons and 2 daughters. Helen Liang died in 1960. Thus in 1961, YC Liang donated money to the Hong Kong Government to found Helen Liang Memorial Primary School to commemorate his deceased wife. The campus location was at Po Hing Fong, Sheung Wan (near the Blake Garden), and the school was opened by the then Financial Secretary Arthur Grenfell Clarke, who was the Godfather of Helen Liang.

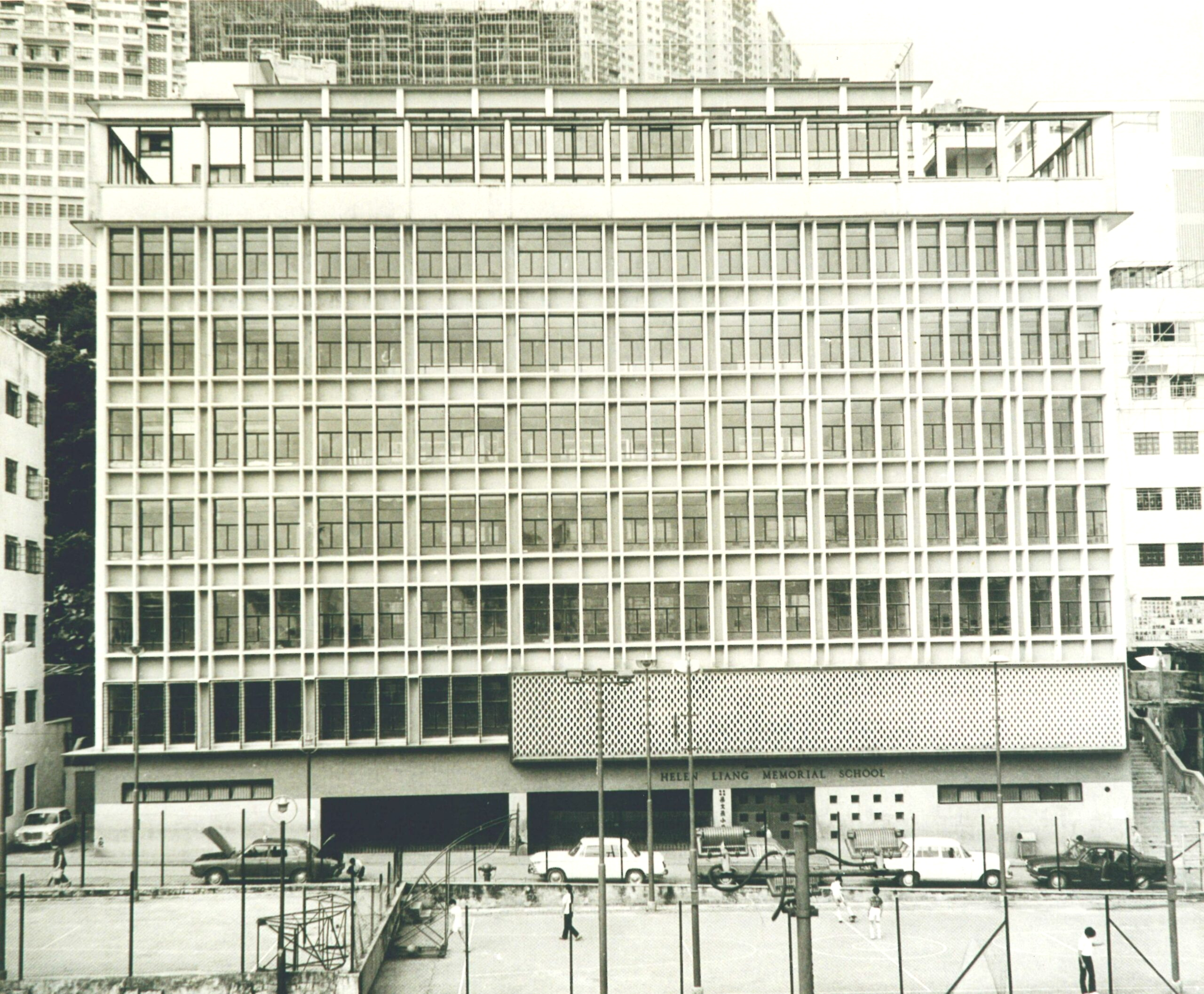
In 1961, Helen Liang Memorial School in the Po Hing Fong was also temporarily used by Ling Daoyang before the merger of the Chinese University of Hong Kong as the premises of United College.

Before the merger of the Chinese University of Hong Kong in 1963, the United College temporarily borrowed half of the Po Hing Fong building of Helen Liang Memorial Primary School as their campus from 1961 to 1962 (the then president was Dr. Ling Daoyang).

Helen Liang Memorial Secondary School was founded in 1977. The funding was donated by YC Liang again. It was also located in Po Hing Fong and named after Ms. Helen Liang, the deceased wife.

In 1988, the Hong Kong Government had granted land of 11,000 square meters in Tai Wai for Helen Liang Memorial Secondary School to build her new campus, and the school thus relocated from Sheung Wan to Sha Tin. The school has also been expanding over the years and has added a lot of facilities. The former site of 40 Po Hing Fong is now the King's College Old Boys' Association Primary School No. 2. It is also the exact location of the Po Hing Fong landslide in 1925.

== Feature ==
Helen Liang Memorial Secondary School (Shatin) locates on a mound in Sha Tin, embraced by a verdant environment. Inside the school stands the outdoor theatre and curved flower path which is peculiar in Hong Kong.

== Facilities ==
There are currently 28 standard classrooms with independent air-conditioning systems (simply it is just 2 air-conditioners per classroom), and includes a science laboratory, several computer rooms, a multi-media learning center, and a literature center. There are also a hall (which is like an auditorium but in Hong Kong style), a library, an outdoor basketball court, an indoor playground with a small digital notice board, and an indoor cafeteria.

== Notable alumni ==
- Dennis To: Actor and martial art champion in Asia

== Nearby historical site ==
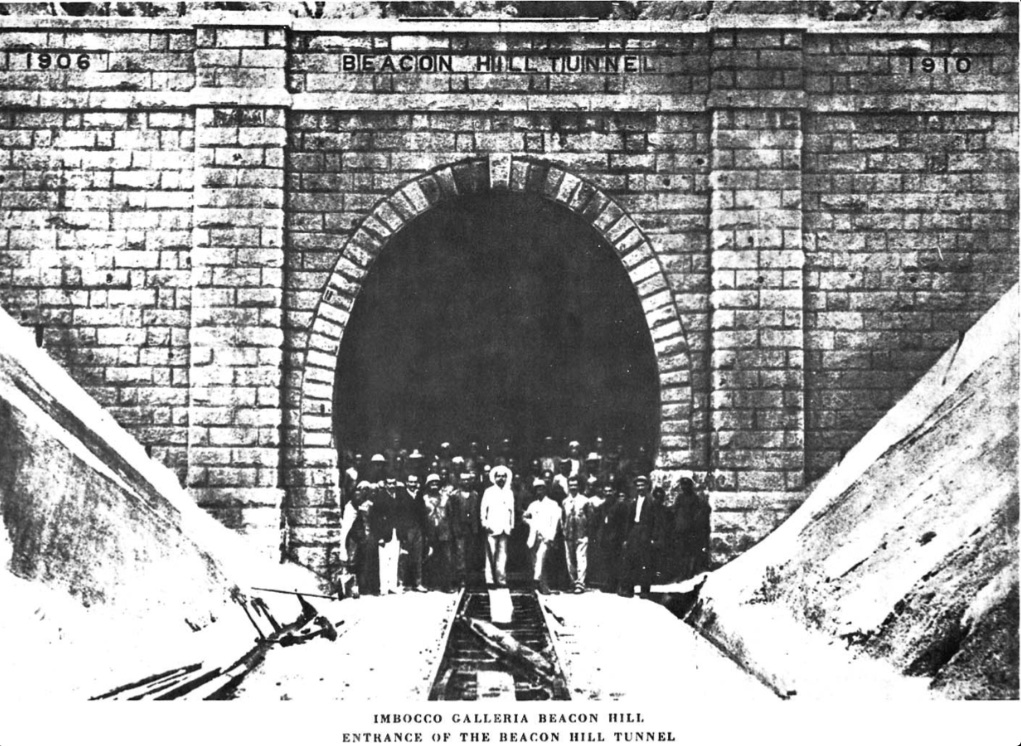
Photograph of the Beacon Hill Tunnel completed in 1910

- Beacon Hill Tunnel: The 100-year-old tunnel which is located at Hin Tin, Tai Wai. The tunnel was originally used as the monorail railway used by the British section of the Kowloon–Canton Railway. It was designed by architect Frederick Southey in 1906 and opened in 1910. After the electrification of the train in 1981, the tunnel was converted to a gas transmission pipeline.
- Sha Tin Water Treatment Work: Located at Hin Tin, Tai Wai and opened in 1964. It is the largest water filtration plant in Hong Kong. It was refurbished in 2015 due to aging facilities.

== See also ==
- List of secondary schools in Hong Kong
- Education in Hong Kong
