= Ng Hon-tsz =

Ng Hon-tsz JP
- 伍漢墀
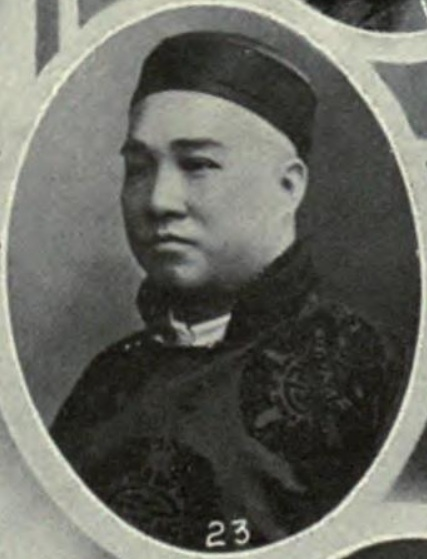

Unofficial Member of the Legislative Council of Hong Kong
- In office June 1931 – 11 April 1923
- Appointed by: Sir Reginald Edward Stubbs
- Preceded by: Lau Chu-pak
- Succeeded by: R. H. Kotewall

Personal details
- Born: 1877 Hong Kong
- Died: 11 April 1923 (aged 47) Hong Kong
- Education: Queen's College

Ng Hon-tsz JP (Chinese: 伍漢墀; 1877 – 11 April 1923) was a Hong Kong businessman and member of the Legislative Council of Hong Kong.

== Career ==
Ng was born in Hong Kong in 1877 in a merchant family. After he graduated from Queen's College. He joined the Yuen Fat Hong, the oldest and then the largest Nam Pak Hong in Hong Kong and became the English correspondent and manager of the shipping department. He was also compradore to the National Bank of China with his brother Ng Long-chow as his assistant, as well as compradore to the Shewan, Tomes & Co. when C. A. Tomes was in charge. He later quit the Shewan, Tomes & Co. and started his own import-export firm of Hontsz & Co. He also owned two piece-goods shops at Canton.

Ng began his public service by serving on the Sanitary Board as a member. He was appointed an unofficial Justice of the Peace in 1909 and a member of the District Watchmen Committee in 1910, which was the advisory board to the Secretary of Chinese Affairs. Ng was also member of the Council and Court of the University of Hong Kong.

He was also director of the Tung Wah Hospital in 1907 and member of the Hospital's Advisory Committee, which was the most prominent charity organisation with high social status in the Hong Kong Chinese community. He was also founder of the Tsan Yuk Hospital. He held other public posts such as member of the Chinese Permanent Cemetery Committee, Chinese Public Dispensary Committee and the Po Leung Kuk Permanent board of directors.

He was appointed unofficial member of the Legislative Council in June 1922 as one of the Chinese representative in the Council in succession to Lau Chu-pak who died in office. As member of the Legislative Council he was an ex-officio member of the Executive Committee of the Chinese General Chamber of Commerce. He was also honorary patron of the Chamber.

== Death ==
In April 1932, Ng Hon-tsz caught a chill after attending Liang Shi-yi's birthday celebration. Dr. Harston was called in and considered his illness as not serious. On 11 April he was still able to hold a long consultation with his new Legislative Council colleague R. H. Kotewall. However he unexpectedly died at his residence at No. 62 Caine Road at about 4 p.m. on the same day at the age of 47 which occasioned much surprise. The cause of his death was stated to be heart failure.

On 17 April, his funeral day, huge crowds lined the route from Ng's residence to Kennedy Town, congested with spectators on Caine Road that the police had to close the thoroughfare to vehicular traffic for two hours. The cortege was moved to the Farewell Pavilion at Kennedy Town, marched with the King's Band playing Chopin's Funeral March and the Dead March in Saul. The funeral was attended by Governor Edward Stubbs as well as many government officials and community leaders. The flag of the Chinese General Chamber of Commerce flew at half mast on that day.

Ng was survived by his wife, one son who was 4 years old when Ng died and several daughters.

Legislative Council of Hong Kong
Preceded by Lau Chu-pak	Chinese Unofficial Member; 1922–1923	Succeeded by Robert Hormus Kotewall
