= Wei Yuk =

Hong Kong businessman

Sir Boshan Wei Yuk CMG JP
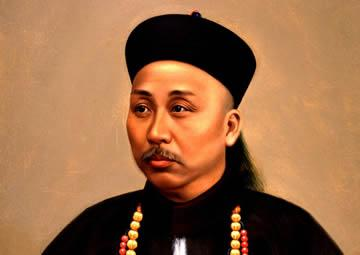

Unofficial Member of the Legislative Council of Hong Kong
- In office 3 December 1896 – 11 October 1917
- Appointed by: Sir William Robinson; Sir Henry Arthur Blake; Sir Frederick Lugard; Sir Francis Henry May
- Preceded by: New seat
- Succeeded by: Ho Fook

Personal details
- Born: 1849 British Hong Kong
- Died: 16 December 1921 (aged 72) British Hong Kong
- Spouse: Lady Wei Yuk (m. 1892–1921)
- Education: Central Government School; Leicester Stoneygate School; Dollar Academy
- Occupation: Compradore

Wei Yuk
- Traditional Chinese: 韋寶珊
Transcriptions
Yue: Cantonese
- Yale Romanization: Wàih Bóu-sāan
- Jyutping: Wai^{4} Bou^{2}-saan^{1}

Sir Boshan Wei Yuk CMG JP (Chinese: 韋寶珊; pinyin: Wéi Bǎoshān; 1849 – 16 December 1921) was a prominent Hong Kong businessman and member of the Legislative Council of Hong Kong.

== Early life, education, and business career ==
Wei was born in Hong Kong in 1849, the son of Wei Kwong (1825–1879), an adopted son of an American missionary, Elijah Coleman Bridgman, at the age of 13; and became the head compradore of the Chartered Mercantile Bank of India, London and China in 1857. His brothers Wei An and Wei Pei were a solicitor and barrister respectively. He married the eldest daughter of Wong Shing, the second Chinese member to be appointed to the Legislative Council of Hong Kong in 1892. Wei received classic Chinese private education and studied at the Government Central School (today known as Queen's College).

Wei was one of the first Chinese to go abroad for Western Education. He proceeded to England in 1867 where he entered the Leicester Stoneygate School. He went to Scotland in 1868 and studied at the Dollar Academy for four years. He returned to Hong Kong after a European tour in 1872.

Wei entered the service of the Chartered Mercantile Bank of India, London and China. Practicing the Chinese custom, he retired from its service for three years when his father died in 1879 and rejoined as compradore and held the position for nearly sixty years.

== Legislative Council unofficial ==
Wei was appointed a Justice of the Peace in 1883 and an unofficial member of the Legislative Council in 1896, representing the Chinese community alongside Kai Ho. In the 1908–09 session presided by Governor Sir Frederick Lugard, an Ordinance to amend the Magistrate's Ordinance 1890 and to effect certain other amendments in the criminal law was tabled in the Legislative Council, criminalising the Chinese habit of spitting in and out of doors were strongly dissented by Kai Ho and Wei, on the ground that to penalise a universal and almost involuntary habit would antagonise the whole Chinese population. A petition movement with 8,000 signature were launched and defeated the legislation.

Shortly after the 1911 Revolution, Wei and Kai Ho voted for an amendment to the Peace Preservation Ordinance which authorised the flogging of rabble-rousers in the prisons, in order to prevent any political and economic instability in Hong Kong, despite Wei and Ho supported the revolution. In April 1912, the Hong Kong government banned the circulation of Chinese coins as it feared the effects of their depreciation after the revolution. In November, Governor May encouraged the Star Ferry and Hong Kong's two tramways stop accepting Chinese coins. Many Chinese took it as an insult to the new Chinese republic and left the local residents with less money for tram fare. A colony-wide boycott broke out, and Wei and Kai Ho defended the tram companies and condemned the boycott for harming the economies of both Hong Kong and Guangdong in a meeting at the Chinese Commercial Union. The boycott ended by early February 1913 with the help from local Chinese merchants.

Boshan Wei Yuk was reappointed for further six-year terms in 1902 and 1908, and a further three-year term in 1914. When he retired from the Legislative Council in October 1917, Governor Sir Henry May paid a very high tribute to Wei.

== Public services ==
He was associated with the official proclamation of the accession of King Edward VII and King George V. He was also a member of the Hong Kong Jubilee Committee in 1890, the Retrenchment Committee in 1894, the Queen's Statue Committee, and the Insanitary Properties Commission, in 1896, the Victoria Diamond Jubilee Committee, and the Indian Famine Relief Committee, in 1897, and the Typhoon Relief Fund Committee in 1906. He was also member of the Council and Court of the University of Hong Kong from 1911 to 1921. Wei and Kai Ho were the first Chinese Freemasons. They took an active part in forming the University Lodge of Hong Kong No. 3666 when the University of Hong Kong was opened in 1912.

Wei was chairman of the Tung Wah Hospital from 1881 to 1883 and from 1888 to 1889, the most prominent Chinese charity authority in Hong Kong. He co-founded the Po Leung Kuk (Society for Protection of Women and Children) and was the permanent member of the committee of the society. He was a good friend to government official Stewart Lockhart, who was godfather to Boshan Wei Yuk's son Lock Wei, and was one of the most enthusiastic supporter of Lockhart's scheme of the Hong Kong District Watchmen's Committee. After its foundation, Wei served as a permanent member of the District Watchmen's Committee from 1898 until his death in 1921.

Wei also served on many commissions appointed by the government to enquire into matters affecting the Chinese and served in connection between the Hong Kong and Chinese governments. He was presented with a gold medal and letter of thanks by the general public and an address of thanks from the Chinese community for his service during the plague epidemic of 1894. During the Six-day riots with the British takeover of New Territories in 1898, Wei was instrumental in pacifying the Chinese. Wei and Kai Ho, as well as other Chinese businessmen spread rumours that the British were going to seize all land, in order to persuade villagers to sell their land cheaply.

Wei was also the originator of the idea of a railway from Kowloon to Canton, and thence to Beijing. The idea was later carried out by the Hong Kong and Chinese governments as the construction of Kowloon-Canton Railway. Wei spent large sum of money in furthering the scheme, which was failed at that time due to the opposition from the Chinese officials.

== Chinese politics ==
During the 1911 Revolution, after Viceroy of Liangguang, Zhang Mingqi sought refuge in the British Consul General's compound, Wei helped establishing peace and order at Canton. He acted as a guarantor of good faith on both the revolutionary army headed by Hu Hanmin and the imperial forces commanded by Admiral Li Chun in Canton.

He was rewarded the Third Class Order of Chao Ho by President Yuan Shikai for his service. He was also offered the civil governorship of Guangdong by President Yuan after Governor Hu Hanmin was driven out by Yuan's army in the Second Revolution, but Wei declined it.

Governors Sir Frederick Lugard and Sir Henry May were uncomfortable with the Chinese Unofficials' active involvement in Chinese politics and close connection with Canton without their prior knowledge. May was convinced that Kai Ho and Wei Yuk were very closely associated with the Sze Yap Association and the government in Canton. An article by Hu Hanmin in the Hong Kong Chinese press on Li Chun's contribution to the revolutionary success in Guangdong in January 1912 included also Wei's role in the revolution. Lugard called for an explanation from Wei who succeeded in explaining away his conduct. However, although May was "willing to acquit Mr. Wei Yuk of disloyalty" in his dispatch to the Secretary of State Lewis Harcourt in 1913, Kai Ho was not so lucky. May said that he had lost confidence in him and he was not reappointed to the Legislative Council.

== Death ==
Boshan Wei Yuk retired in 1917. He died at his residence 37 Wong Nei Chong Road (demolished and now residential flats) at Happy Valley at 9:15 p.m. on 16 December 1921 at the age of 74. He was survived by four sons and two daughters. Lady Wei Yuk died before her husband on 7 February 1921.

== Honours ==
In recognition of his great public services to Hong Kong, Wei was created a Companion of the Most Distinguished Order of St. Michael and St. George in 1908. He was knighted in 1919 after his retirement from the Legislative Council. Wei was also honoured by King Gustave V of Sweden with the First Class Order of Wasa in 1918. He was rewarded the Third Class Order of Chao Ho by President Yuan Shikai for his efforts in maintaining peace and order in Canton during the 1911 Revolution.

== Family ==
His son Wei Wing-lok (韋榮洛) was a well-known Chinese tennis player who was the Chinese national tennis champion in 1914 and was one of the first engineering graduates of the University of Hong Kong in 1916 before matriculating at MIT.

He represented China in the Far Eastern Olympic Games held in China and Japan in 1921 and 1923, captain of China's Olympic Lawn Tennis Team in 1924, making him one of the first Chinese athletes to participate in the Olympics. In 1925, he was the captain of China's first Davis Cup team.

Wei figured in several important championship matches in England (including Wimbledon) in the 1920s.

He died in New York on 23 September 1935.

His great-great-grandson Lo Tak-Chun (卢德俊) is a technologist and venture capitalist based out of Hong Kong. He was one of the first directors for Techstars and served under Paul Chan for two terms under the inaugural Hong Kong Government Innovation, Technology, and Industry Bureau. He also served in the United States Army with distinction.

== Legacy ==
Po Shan Road, in the Mid Levels, was named after him.

Legislative Council of Hong Kong
New seat	Chinese Unofficial Member; 1896–1917	Succeeded by Ho Fook
Preceded by Kai Ho	Senior Unofficial Member; 1914–1917	Succeeded by Sir Henry Pollock
Preceded by Kai Ho	Senior Chinese Unofficial Member; 1914–1917	Succeeded by Lau Chu-pak
