= Lau Chu-pak =

Hong Kong merchant and politician

Lau Chu-pak CMG JP
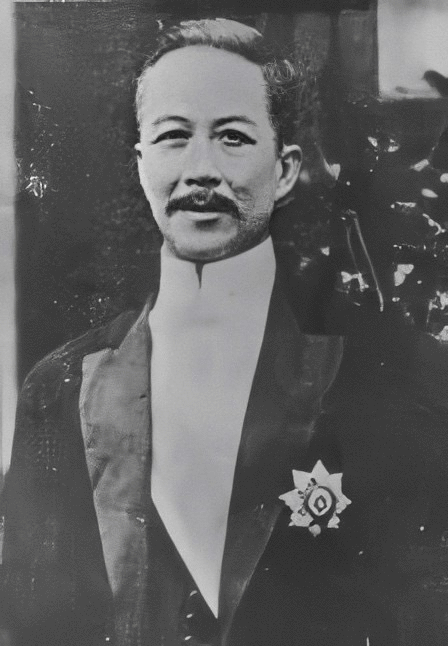

Unofficial Member of the Legislative Council of Hong Kong
- In office 5 September 1913 – 7 June 1922
- Appointed by: Sir Francis Henry May; Sir Reginald Edward Stubbs
- Preceded by: Ho Kai
- Succeeded by: Ng Hon-tsz

Personal details
- Born: 5 June 1867 Hong Kong
- Died: 3 May 1922 (aged 54) Hong Kong

Lau Chu-pak
- Traditional Chinese: 劉鑄伯
Transcriptions
Yue: Cantonese
- Yale Romanization: Làuh Jyu baak
- Jyutping: Lau^{4} Zyu^{3} baak^{3}

Lau Chu-pak CMG JP (5 June 1867 – 3 May 1922) was a Hong Kong merchant and politician.

Lau Chu-pak was admitted to Queen's College in the same year as Sun Yat-sen. He became a clerk at the Hong Kong Observatory and later went into business and became a comprador of the West Point Godown Company in 1888 and of A. S. Watson from 1893. Together with Ho Fook, they founded the Chinese General Chamber of Commerce, where he later served as chairman.

Along with Sir Robert Hotung, Lau was an early developer of the West Hung Hom (now East Tsim Sha Tsui) area of Kowloon in the 1890s.

He held various public posts, including the chairmanship of Po Leung Kuk and Tung Wah Hospital, and was a member of the District Watch Committee and the Sanitary Board. He was appointed as Unofficial Member of the Legislative Council from 1913 until his death in 1922.

He helped found the University of Hong Kong by donating to the endowment fund in 1911. He later became a member of the University's Court between 1911 and 1914 and was made honorary life member of the Court in 1914. He was a member of the University Council from 1911 to 1922.

In 1921, Lau and fellow Legislative Councillor Ho Fook established the Society for the Protection of the Mui Tsai, an initiative aimed at curbing the demise of the mui-tsai system, a form of child slavery in which young girls were bought and sold in Hong Kong and other parts of China. The society had the backing of Chinese community leaders including Ts'o Seen Wan, Chow Shou-son and Ho Kom-tong.

Lau adopted a staunchly conservative and anti-communist stance amid the 1925 Seamen's Strike. He regarded "strong Bolshevist support" as the root cause and opposed any concession.

His son Lau Tak-po founded the Hong Kong and Yaumatei Ferry Company, which is still under the control of the family.

Legislative Council of Hong Kong
Preceded by Ho Kai	Chinese Unofficial Member; 1913–1922	Succeeded by Ng Hon-tsz
Preceded by Wei Yuk	Senior Chinese Unofficial Member; 1917–1922	Succeeded by Chow Shou-son
