= Ho Fook =

Hong Kong compradore and philanthropist (1863–1926)

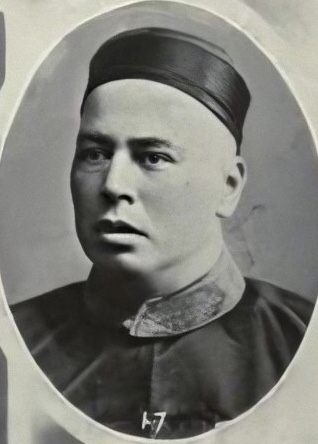

Unofficial Member of the Legislative Council of Hong Kong
- In office 22 October 1917 – 14 November 1921
- Appointed by: Sir Francis Henry May
- Preceded by: Wei Yuk
- Succeeded by: Chow Shou-son

Personal details
- Born: 30 November 1863 British Hong Kong
- Died: 29 August 1926 (aged 62) British Hong Kong
- Spouse: Lucy née Rothwell
- Education: Government Central School
- Occupation: Compradore

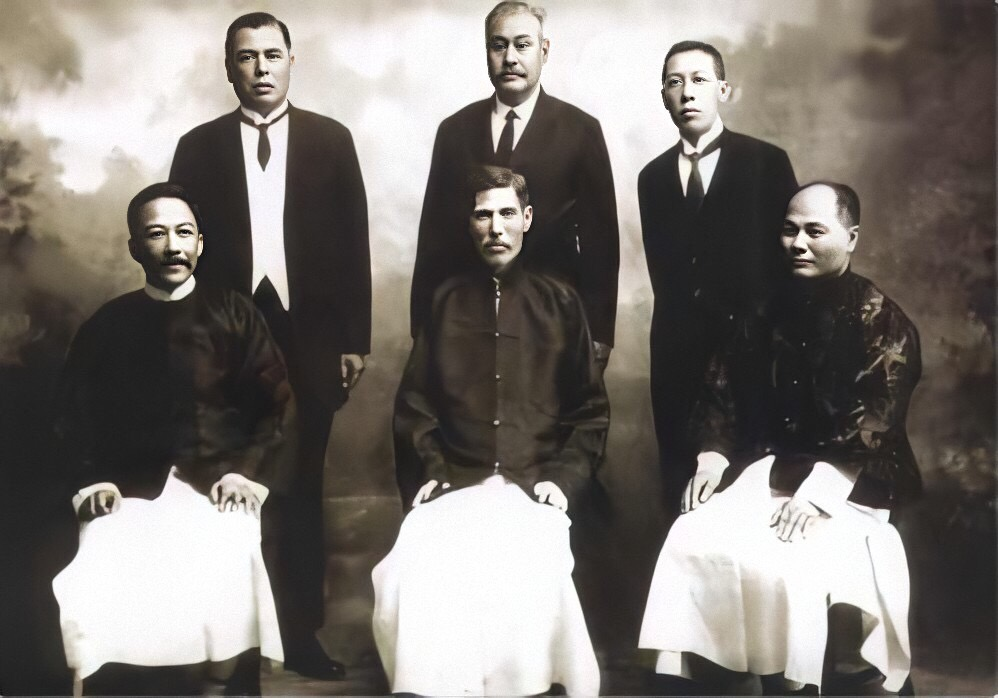
Ho Fook (left, standing) with his brother Robert Hotung (seated, middle)

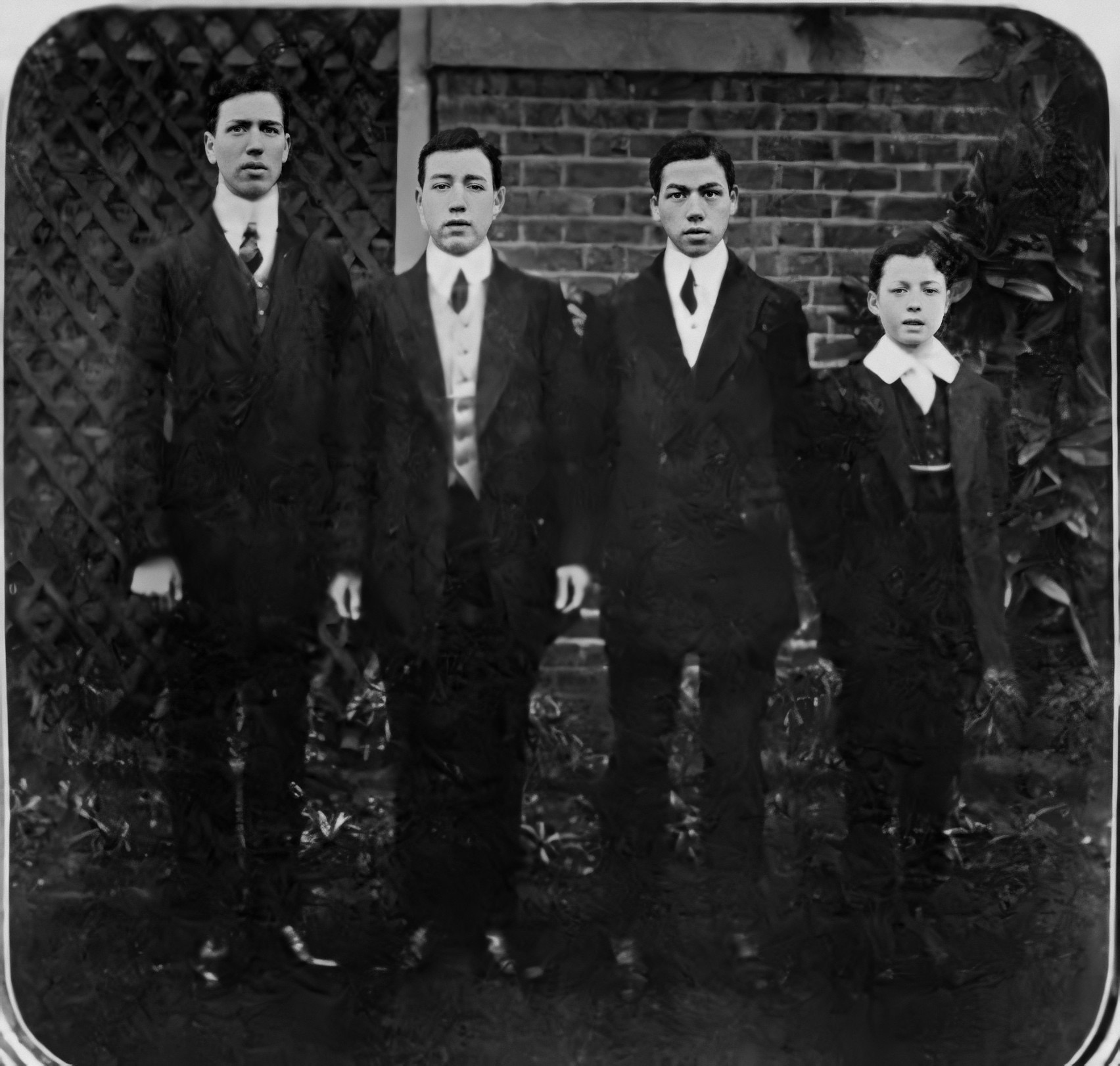
Sons of Ho Fook

Ho Fook (Chinese: 何福; 30 November 1863 – 29 August 1926), alias Ho Chak-sang, JP, was a prominent Hong Kong Eurasian compradore and philanthropist.

== Early life ==
Ho was born in Hong Kong in 1863 to the wealthy Jew Charles Henry Maurice Bosman and Boat Dwellers mother Sze Sze.

== Education ==
Ho studied at the Government Central School (later became the Queen's College).

== Career ==
After graduating, Ho joined a Chinese shipping firm in Haiphong as a clerk and later worked as a translator at the Registrar-General's department. He joined a legal firm called Denneys & Mossop in 1882 as an interpreter and worked at the firm for three years.

In 1891, he was appointed assistant compradore to the Jardine, Matheson & Co. under his elder brother Robert Hotung who was the chief compradore. He succeeded his brother as the chief compradore of the firm in 1900 and his younger half brother Ho Kom-tong became his assistant. His son, Ho Leung, succeeded his father to become the chief compradore of the Jardine, Matheson & Co. after his retirement.

He was appointed many public offices as the leader of the Chinese community. He was appointed Justice of the Peace in 1892 and was appointed to the Legislative Council of Hong Kong in 1917 as one of the representatives of the Chinese community on retirement of Wei Yuk and served until 1921. In 1926, he was appointed to the Board which advised the government upon the distribution of the Trade Loan.

He was also member of the District Watchmen's Committee, member of the Chinese Permanent Cemetery Committee, the Chinese Public Dispensaries Committee, advisory committee of the Tung Wah Hospital and Po Leung Kuk, the two most prominent charitable organisations in the colony. He was also the managing director of the local newspaper Hongkong Telegraph. With Lau Chu-pak, they founded the Chinese General Chamber of Commerce in 1900.

In 1921, Ho and fellow Legislative Councilor Lau Chu Pak established the Society for the Protection of the Mui Tsai in defense of the mui-tsai system, a form of child slavery with the support of Chinese community leaders like Ts'o Seen Wan, Chow Shou-son and Ho Kom-tong.

He served as vice-president of the Ellis Kadoorie Chinese School Society and member of the Court of the University of Hong Kong. he was also the founder of the annual scholarship for students at the Queen's College and the University of Hong Kong. His donation to the University of Hong Kong also became the foundation of the School of Physiology.

== Death ==
Ho suffered from a relapse on 29 August 1926 and died in the afternoon.

== Family ==
Ho Fook's father was a man of Jewish Dutch ancestry named Charles Henri Maurice Bosman (1839–1892) and his mother was Madame Sze, a local woman of Bao'an (present-day Shenzhen) heritage. His brothers Sir Robert Hotung and half-brother Ho Kom-tong (same mother; father Kwok Hing-yin (郭興賢)) were also prominent social figures in Hong Kong. Ho Kom-tong's daughter Grace Ho (何愛瑜) was the mother of Bruce Lee.

Ho Fook had thirteen sons and five of them survived when Ho Fook died. All of them were educated in England and three of whom worked as compradores for various foreign companies, Ho Leung was the chief compradore of the Jardine, Matheson & Co. after his father, Ho Iu was the compradore of the Mercantile Bank of India, London and China, and Ho Ki was the compradore of E.D. Sassoon & Co. Ho Wing, another son of him who was adopted by Robert Hotung was also the compradore of the Hongkong and Shanghai Banking Corporation. There were also Ho Kwong and S. C. Ho in which the latter was member of the Sanitary Board. Ho Fook had also five daughters. One of Ho Fook's grandsons, Stanley Ho, was a casino and shipping magnate.

Ho Fook lived at No. 10, Caine Road (now the site of Caritas House and the Catholic Diocese Centre).

Legislative Council of Hong Kong
Preceded by Wei Yuk	Chinese Unofficial Member; 1917–1921	Succeeded by Chow Shouson
