= Chan Sze Chi =

Hong Kong Christian theologian

- 陳士齊
- Born: 1957 (age 68–69); Hong Kong
- Other names: 齋sir; Sai Sir
- Education: University of Hong Kong, University of Aberdeen, King's College London

Chan Sze Chi (Chinese: 陳士齊; pinyin: Chén Shìqí; born 1957) is a Hong Kong religious scholar and one of the founders of the League of Social Democrats.

== Biography ==
Born in 1957, Chan took up Christianity as a boy following the early death of a sister. He attended Queen's College, Hong Kong and obtained his Bachelor of Divinity at the University of Aberdeen in 1985. After returning to Hong Kong in 1992, he taught in the Department of Religion and Philosophy at Hong Kong Baptist University and earned his PhD in Systematic theology from King's College London in 1997. In 2001, along with Leung Man-tao and Chan Koonchung, he co-founded the Niupeng Academy (牛棚書院), an independent publisher of free works on philosophical and artistic topics, which also acted as a community college within the Niupeng Arts Village (牛棚藝術村) in To Kwa Wan.

Chan is one of the founders of League of Social Democrats although he withdrew after disagreements with Wong Yuk-man. As an activist, he has published numerous research articles on LGBT and sociology, and claims to have been the first Christian theologian in Hong Kong advocating for LGBT rights. He participated in multiple public debates on Christianity in Hong Kong in the 1990s and 2000s, and in 2007 published two critiques of the religious right that led to his characterisation as "one of the most prominent intellectuals within the Christian church opposing the religious right." Chan has advocated for Christians to use the influence of the church to engage in dialogue with the government, including through confrontation. He has also participated as a lecturer in public convocations called "Raising the Bar", where academics give free lectures to the public in bars, with the goal of bringing education into normal social life and inviting the general public into the conversation on academic topics.

During a 26-year career at Hong Kong Baptist University, where he was a popular instructor, Chan often came into conflict with management over university policies, especially language requirements and cash cow General Studies courses. The university opted not to renew his contract after the 2014–15 academic year, and he left their employ in 2018. In the interim, his profile increased as a vocal supporter of students opposed to unpopular university policies, including participation in student protests, where he was the only faculty member joining in. His presence in a 2018 "Occupy HKBU" student protest led to an open letter signed by 150 other faculty members, which accused Chan of betrayal, and alleged that faculty present at the occupied Language Center were subject to harassment.

== Selected publications ==
- Chan Sze Chi; Fok Juk-lin (霍玉蓮) (1993). 思想列車 [The Train of Thought]. Hong Kong: Syundou. ISBN 9789622443563.
- Chan San-hing (陳慎慶), ed. (2008). 香港基督教右派的意識形態 [The Ideology of Hong Kong Christian Rightists]. 衝突與融合：後九七的香港教會與社會 [Conflict and Integration: The Church and Society of Hong Kong in the Post 1997 Era]. Hong Kong Christian Institute (香港基督徒學院). pp. 31–40. ISBN 9789627471691.
- 基督徒關社的真純實踐 (Authentic Practice) [Authentic Practice of Christian Care in Hong Kong]. 關社廿載情—基督徒關懷香港學會二十週年紀念文集 [Collected Works on the 20th Anniversary of the Christian Care for Hong Kong Society]. Hong Kong: 基督徒關懷香港學會. October 2007. pp. 28–31.
- Ziu Sung-ming (趙崇明), ed. (2006). 憶吾師 [Remembering My Teacher]. 三一、創造、文化—根頓神學的詮釋 [Trinity, Creation, and Culture: An Interpretation of Gunton's Theology]. Hong Kong: 基道出版社. pp. 14–25. ISBN 9789624573220.
- Zang Gu-daat (曾家達); Leong Juk-kei (梁玉麒), eds. (2014) [2006]. 助人者的無助與自助 [Helplessness and Self Help of Helpers]. 微光處處 [Points of Light Everywhere]. 香港社會工作者總工會. pp. 238–248. ISBN 9789881591593.
- 福音派教會將自己與同性戀者深陷斷背山. Sze 思. 香港基督徒學院 (Hong Kong Christian Institute). May 2006. No. 99, pp. 28–38 – via Official archives at Google drive.
- 南亞海嘯的進一步反思 [Further Reflection on the South Asian Tsunami]. 念集，香港浸會大學學生關懷南亞海嘯出版委員會 [Reading Collection, Hong Kong Baptist University Student Care South Asian Tsunami Publishing Committee]. May 2006. pp. 31–36.
