= Po Hing Fong landslide =

1925 disaster in Hong Kong

The Po Hing Fong landslide was an accidental collapse of a retaining wall in Po Hing Fong, Hong Kong on July 17, 1925. It was located next to the Blake Garden, causing 75 deaths. It is the landslide accident with the largest number of deaths in the history of Hong Kong.
