= YC Liang =

Hong Kong businessman

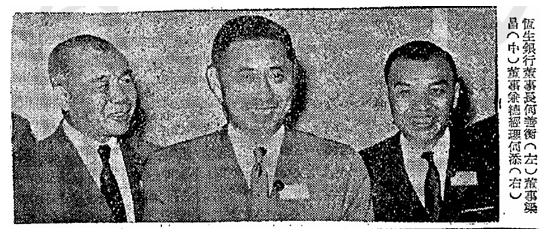
YC Liang (center), Ho Sin Hang (left) and Ho Tim (right) (Wah Kiu Yat Po, 1962-9-4)

YC Liang CBE (Chinese: 梁昌; pinyin: Liáng Chāng; 1918–1979) was a businessman in British Hong Kong. He was an agent in the British Army Aid Group during World War II. He was the father of hydrofoil business between Hong Kong and Macau and a co-founder of Hang Seng Bank.

== Career ==
In 1951, YC Liang founded the Yu On Shipping Company (裕安輪船) together with Ho Yin and Ho Tim. In July of that year, Liang acquired the SS Fatshan from Sir Tsun-Nin Chau's Man On Shipping and Navigation Company marking Liang's first steps into the Hong Kong to Macao ferry business.
