= Queen's College, Hong Kong =

Secondary school in Hong Kong

Queen's College
- 皇仁書院 (Chinese)

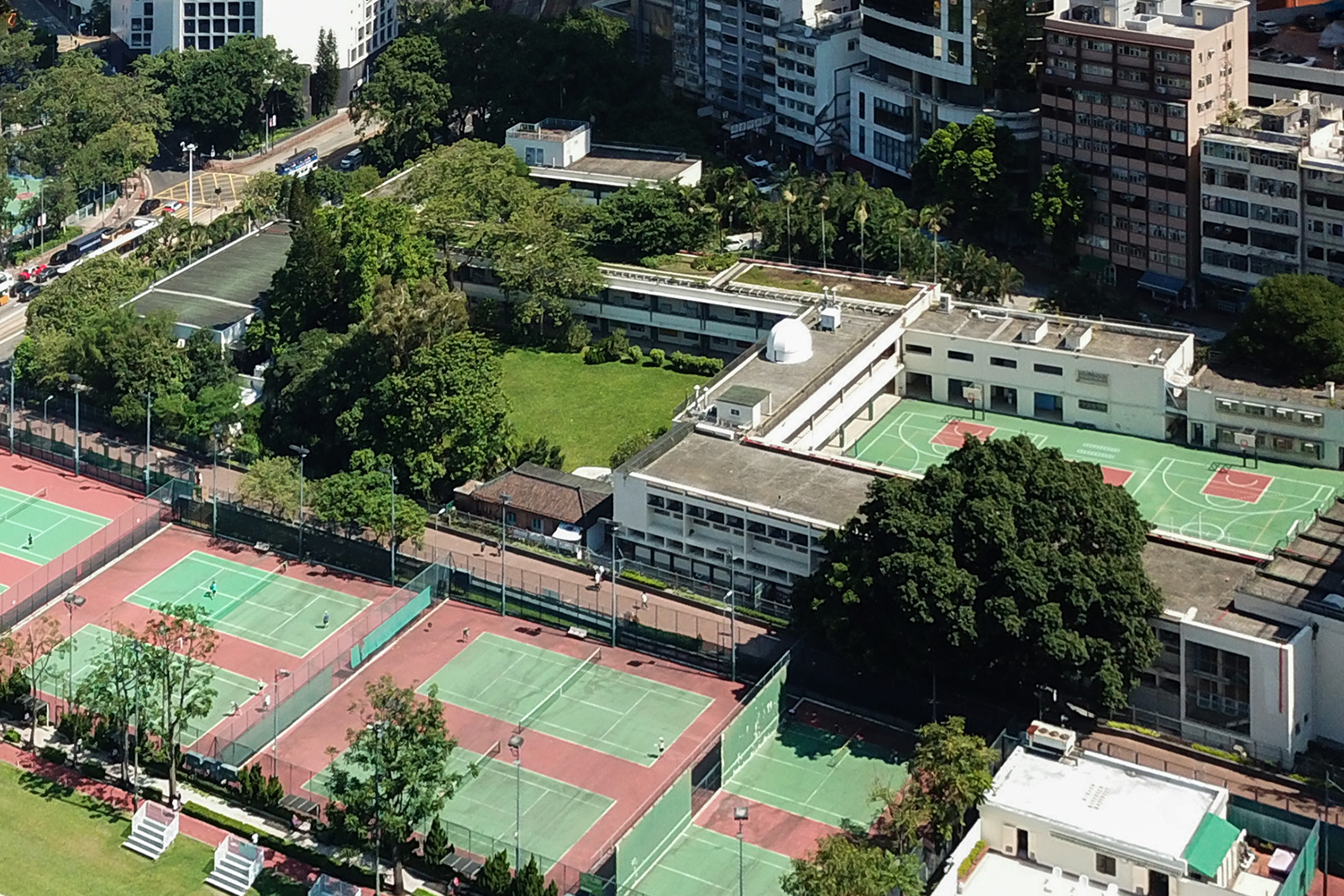
- Queen's College campus

Location
- 120 Causeway Road; Causeway Bay; Hong Kong; 22.2809°N 114.1917°E

Information
- Type: Public, single-sex
- Motto: "Labor Omnia Vincit" (Latin) "勤有功" (Chinese) "Labour conquers all" (English)
- Established: 1862; 164 years ago
- Principal: Mr CHAN Cheung Wai Eric
- Staff: About 90 staff
- Enrollment: About 785 students
- Color: Red
- Mascot: Dragon
- Medium of instruction: English, except for Chinese Language, Chinese History and Mandarin.
- Campus Size: Approximately 2.5 acres (16,766 m^{2})
- School Magazine: The Yellow Dragon, from 1899
- Website: www.qc.edu.hk

Queen's College, Hong Kong
- Traditional Chinese: 皇仁書院
- Simplified Chinese: 皇仁书院
Transcriptions
Standard Mandarin
- Hanyu Pinyin: Huángrén Shūyuàn
Yue: Cantonese
- Yale Romanization: Wòhng yàhn syū yún
- Jyutping: Wong4 jan4 syu1 jyun6*2

Victoria College
- Traditional Chinese: 皇后書院
Transcriptions

The Government Central School
- Traditional Chinese: 中央書院
Transcriptions

Third alternative Chinese name
- Traditional Chinese: 大書院
Transcriptions

Queen's College (Chinese: 皇仁書院) is the first public secondary school founded by the British colonial government in Hong Kong. It was initially named The Government Central School (中央書院) in 1862 and later renamed Victoria College (維多利亞書院) in 1890, and finally obtained the present name of Queen's College in 1894. It is currently located in Causeway Bay.

== History ==
The history of the college can be traced back to the Chinese village schools that were believed to have existed prior to the founding of British Hong Kong as a colony in 1842.

In August 1847, the British colonial government decreed that grants would be given to existing Chinese village schools in Hong Kong. It appointed an Education Committee in November of that year to examine the state of Chinese schools in Victoria, Stanley and Aberdeen, the aim being to bring the schools under closer government supervision. Following its examinations, the Committee reported that 3 Chinese village schools, namely Taipingshan School (28 pupils), Chungwan School (18 pupils) and Sheungwan School (21 pupils) were operating actively within Victoria City under Chinese masters Mr. Chuy Shing-cheung, Mr. Leung Sing-Than and Mr. Mak Mai-chun, respectively. The books used in these schools included the Three Character Classic, and the Four Books and Five Classics. This marked the beginning of the establishment of public education in Hong Kong. Subsequently, government intervention in the provision of education in Hong Kong increased, and in 1857, it established new schools, including West Point School, to meet the ever-increasing demand for education in the burgeoning entrepôt.

In 1860, the British sinologist Rev. Dr. James Legge proposed that the Board of Education establish a Central School that would amalgamate the 3 existing government sponsored and monitored Chinese schools (Taipingshan, Chungwan and Sheungwan) in Victoria City. Two years later, a Government Central School on Gough Street, Central, opened its doors to the public in 1862. Its first headmaster was Dr. Frederick Stewart, who was also appointed Inspector of Schools in the Colony. As Headmaster, he was responsible for the supervision of all schools in Hong Kong until March 1879, when the Government established a separate office for the Inspector; this later became the precursor to the Department of Education, which was then incorporated into the Education Bureau.

In its first five years, the school admitted only Chinese students as a matter of policy. In 1867, it began admitting students of other nationalities, such as British, Indian, Parsee, Japanese and Thai. While Chinese students had to enroll in English classes, students from other nationalities were not expected to study the Chinese classics.

Secular schooling sparked a great deal of controversy with the Hong Kong Governor and religious leaders. On many occasions, the Governor personally scrutinized and intervened in the operations of these schools. Later, the Government established a grant program that enabled religious schools to compete on par with the Central School for funding.

On 26 April 1884, a foundation stone was laid on Aberdeen Street for the school's new premises by Sir George Bowen, Governor from 1883 to 1887. Witnessing the ceremony was Sun Yat-sen, then a student at the school. On the Governor's recommendation, the school was to be renamed Victoria College following the completion of the new building.

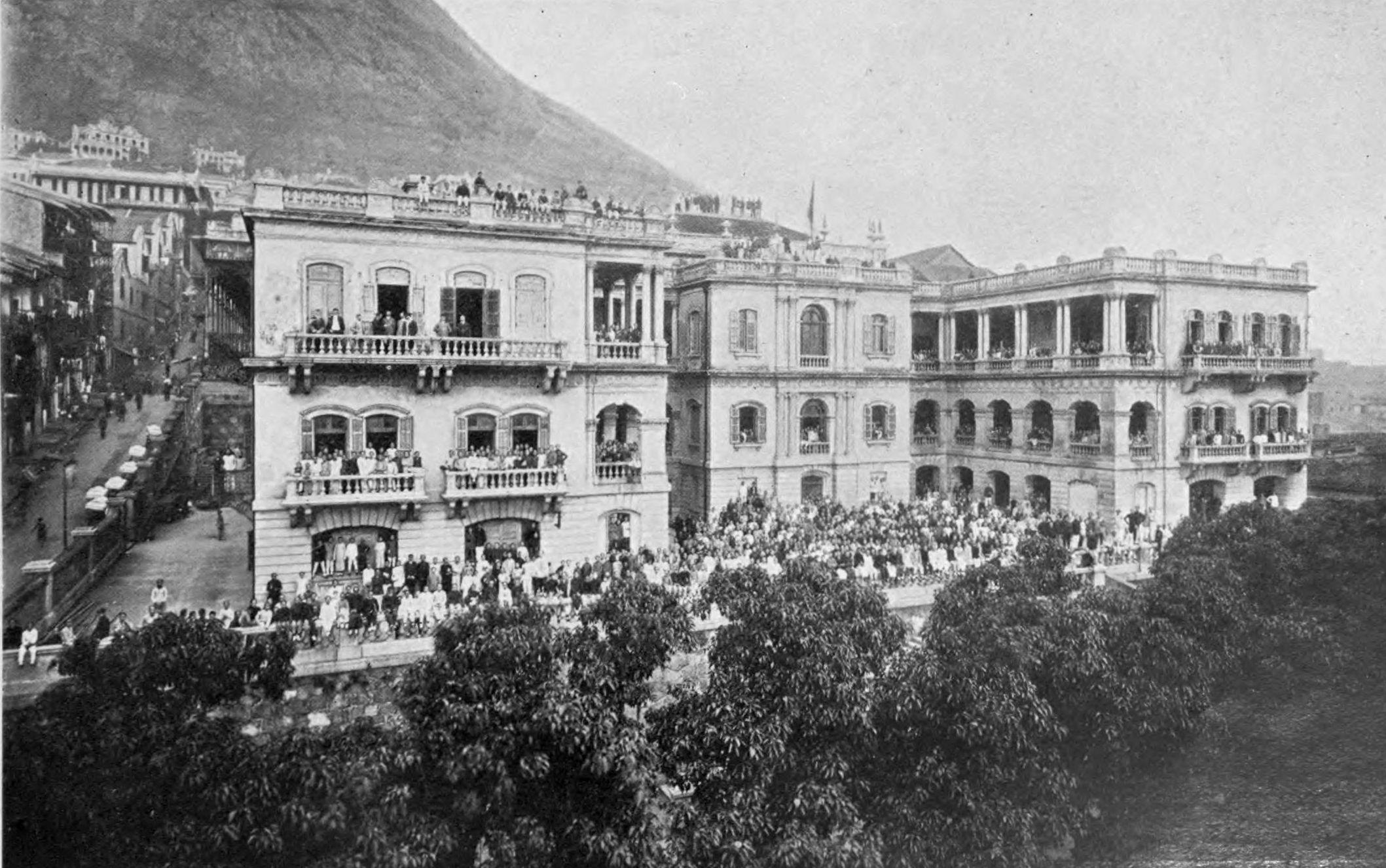
Queen's College, a photograph from 1908

In 1889, construction of the school was completed at a cost of HKD250,000, making it one of the largest and most expensive buildings in Hong Kong at that time.

In 1894, the school was officially renamed Queen's College. Since the 1870s, the Government had wanted to expand the college to become a university; however, the idea was scrapped after the outbreak of the Russo-Japanese War in 1904. Fearing that the benefits it enjoyed in the Far-East could be jeopardized by Japan's growing influence in the region, the British colonial government decided that it was crucial to establish a university that could train graduates in war-related subjects, such as engineering and medicine. While Queen's College remained a secondary school, this eventually led to the establishment of the University of Hong Kong in 1910.

Following the Japanese invasion of Hong Kong in 1941, the school was forced to close, after which it was converted into a Field hospital. Immediately after the fall of Hong Kong, refugees stripped the buildings of their timber for fuel. During the Japanese occupation, the school site was used by Japanese Occupying Forces. As a result, the campus was destroyed during an Allied bombing attack near the end of the War (1944 or 1945). For a brief period after, its ruins were occupied by refugees following the Japanese surrender, and fire accidents were common. Beginning in 1948, the site was cleared to make way for the PMQ.

In 1947, the school re-opened in a temporary facility on Kennedy Road, sharing a campus with Clementi Secondary School.

In 1950, a new campus of Queen's College was built in Causeway Bay to accommodate the school's expansion. It moved to the present site on Causeway Road, opposite Victoria Park, on 22 September. That day, Sir Alexander Grantham, Governor of Hong Kong, announced the re-opening of Queen's College. Since then, the two-storey high building has served countless numbers of Q.C. students.

Until 1951, pupils typically entered Queen's College at Class 4 (equivalent to today's Form 3). In September 1951, two additional grades were created at the bottom end of the school, the lowest grade thus becoming Class 6 (Form 1 today). For a time, these changes in organization and other factors, resulting from the rapid growth of education, led to an uneven distribution of divisions. In 1950 for instance, there were ten divisions of Class 4. In 1951, four of these divisions were transferred to King's College. From 1955, undergraduates intending to focus on the Arts were transferred to King's College and later to Belilios Public School for their Advanced Level year. From 1962, an extra Upper Sixth Form was provided to arts students so that QC boys would no longer have to study at Belilios. Meanwhile, for a brief period, Belilios Girls were sent over to Queen's to study Science. Since then, Queen's College has remained a full-time Anglo-Chinese secondary school for boys.

== School Logo ==
At Queen's College, school logos were only officially adopted after the Second World War. Prior to the War, the school, like other government departments, used the Royal Emblem as its logo. However, Queen's College's first school logo was designed as early as 1923 by Mr Ng Ping-un, Chief Chinese draftsman of the Architectural Office. The post-war school logo changed numerous times, all of them based on Ng's 1923 design. The school's current logo was adopted in 1997 after the transfer of sovereignty over Hong Kong.

== List of Top Scorers in Public Examinations ==
As of 2010, Queen's College has produced the highest number of perfect achievers in the history of Hong Kong Certificate of Education Examination (HKCEE) and Hong Kong Diploma of Secondary Education Examination (HKDSE), with 57 perfect scorers "10As" in HKCEE and 14 "Top Scorers" and "Super Top Scorers" in HKDSE. 7 x 5** "Top Scorers" are candidates who obtained perfect scores of 5** in each of the four core subjects and three electives. 8 x 5** "Super Top Scorers" are candidates who obtained seven Level 5** in four core subjects and three electives, and an additional Level 5** in the Mathematics Extended (M1/M2) module.

== Activities and achievements ==
There are 49 clubs grouped under Sports, Recreational, Religious, Social Services, and Academic (Science & Arts) areas. Most clubs hold events and functions for the participation of all students and many of them organize joint events with sister schools throughout every academic year. They also actively participate in annual school Open Days.

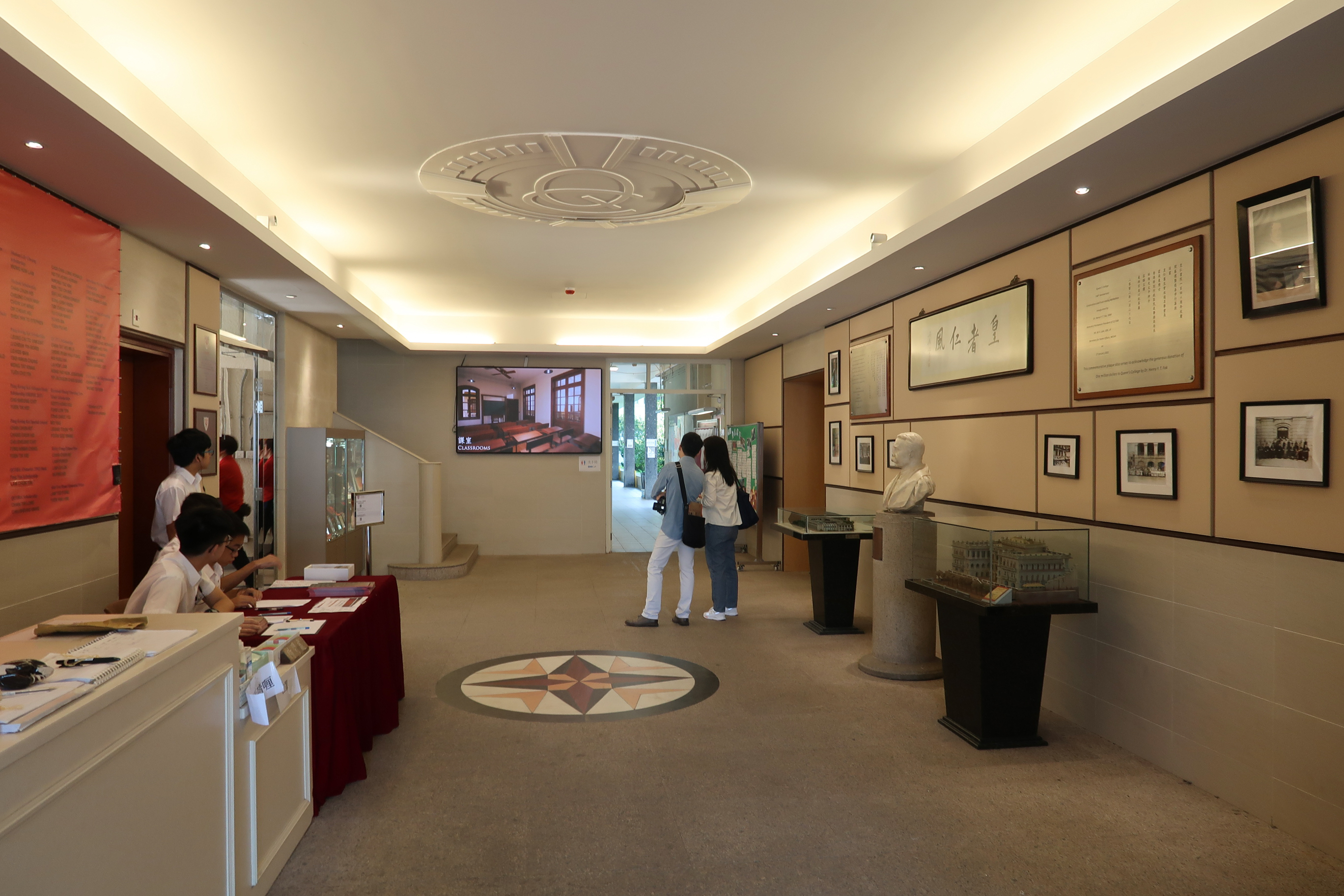
Lobby

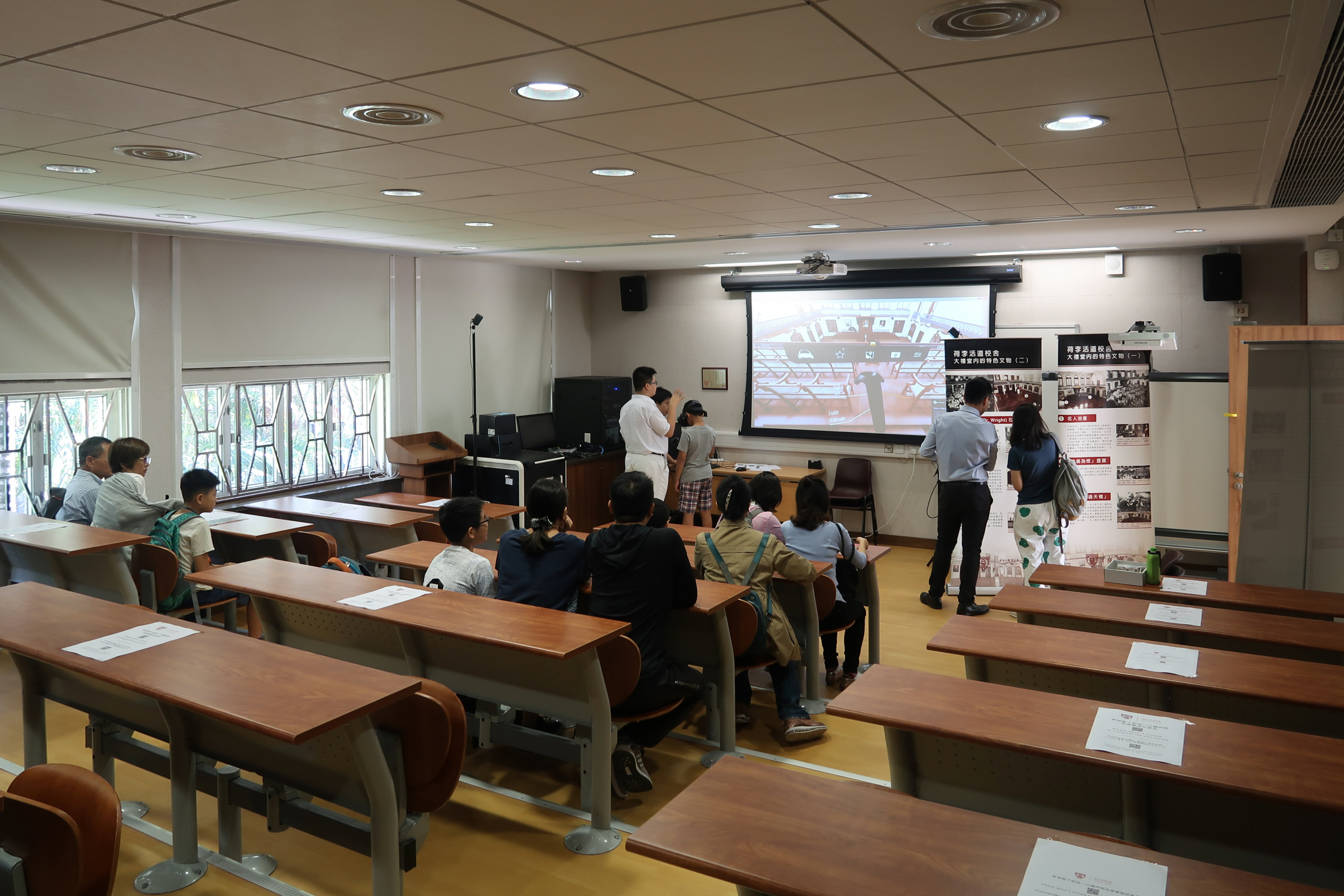
Lecture Theatre

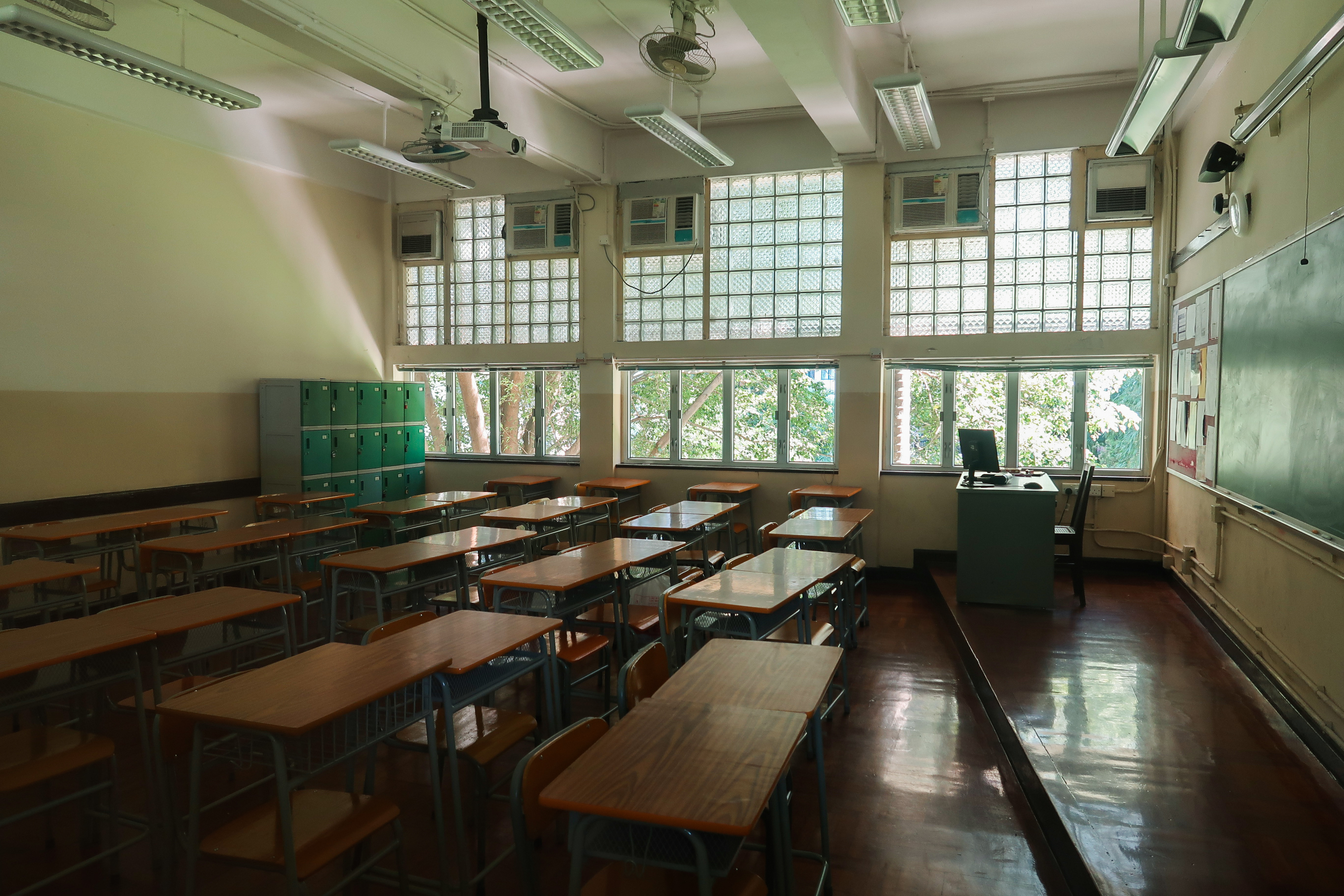
Classroom interior

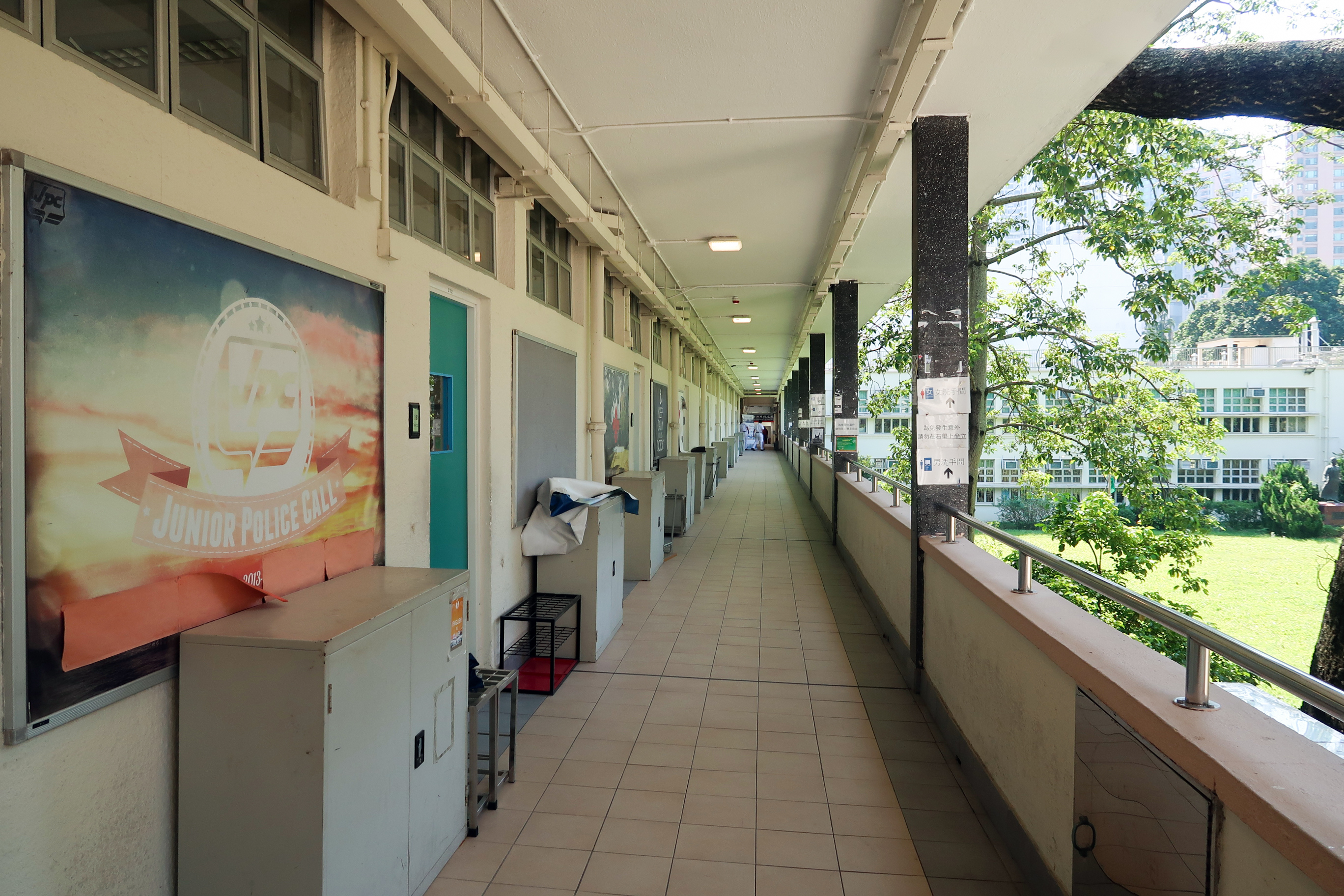
Level 1 corridor

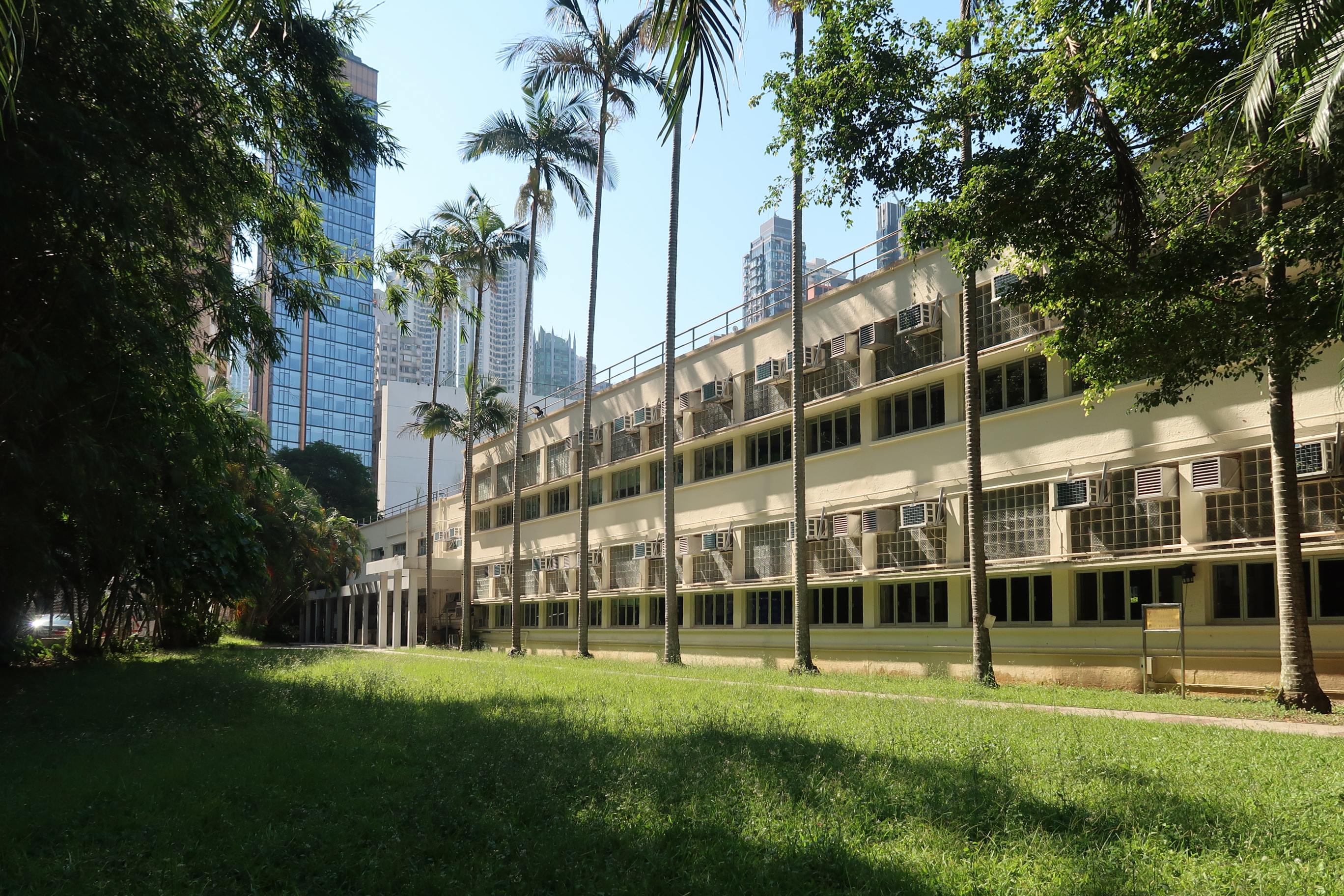
Lawn area

=== Hong Kong Outstanding Students Awards ===
Queen's College students have won 21 of the past Hong Kong Outstanding Students Awards, placing the school in 2nd place among all secondary schools in Hong Kong. Of the 45 winners and finalists, 21 have served on the executive committee of the Hong Kong Outstanding Students' Association (HKOSA)

=== Hong Kong Special Administrative Region Outstanding Students Awards ===
Queen's College counts a total of seven winners and finalists of the Hong Kong Outstanding Students Awards from 2002 to 2017.

== Publications ==
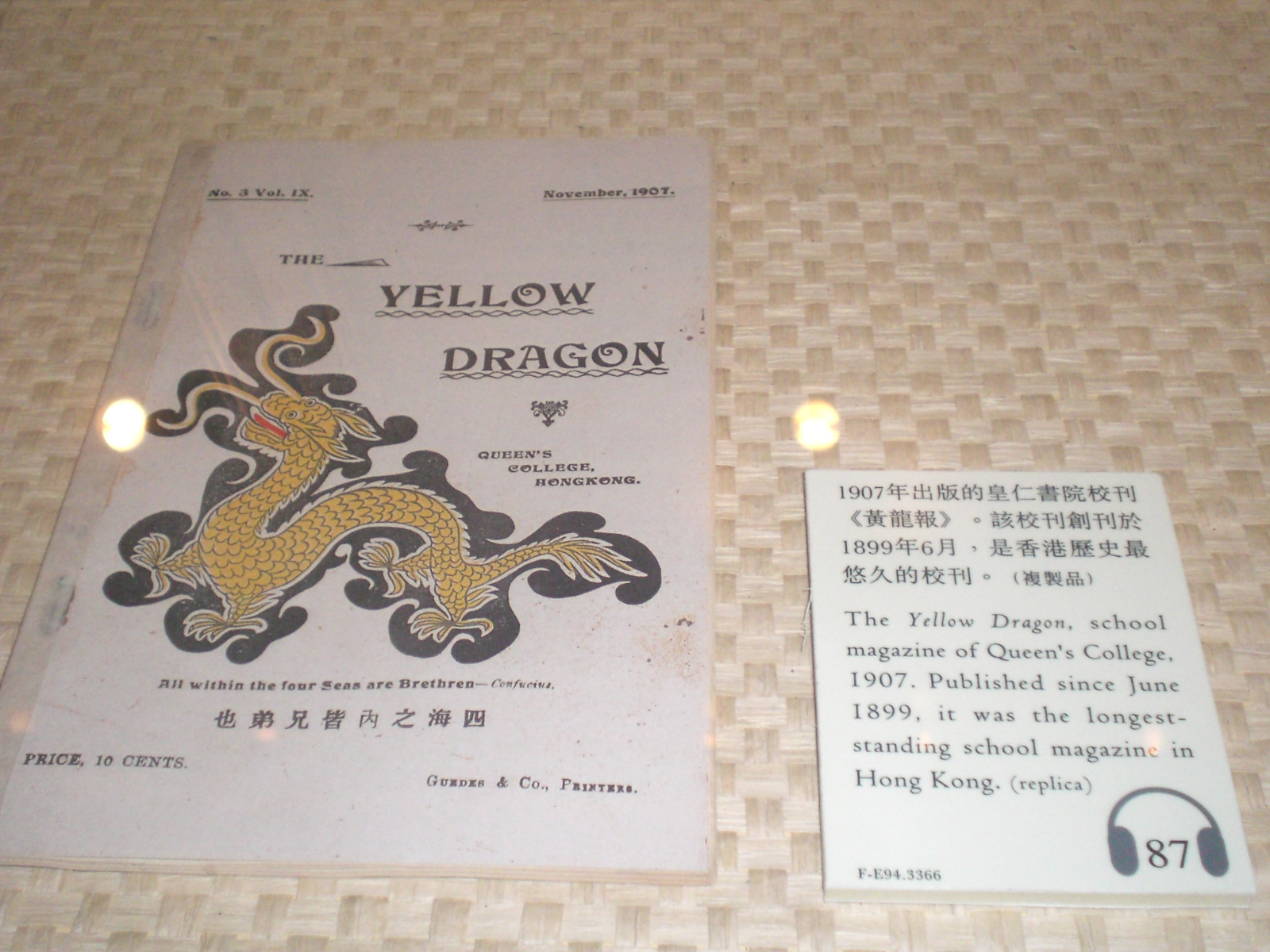
A school magazine named The Yellow Dragon.

First published in June 1899, the Queen's College school magazine, The Yellow Dragon (黃龍報), is the world's oldest existing Anglo-Chinese school magazine. A priceless historical resource, it provides a window into the evolution of education in Hong Kong and on societal evolution in the Asia Pacific region. In 2005, the magazine published its 100th volume. The Chinese section of the edition featured a brief summary of the magazine's past 100 volumes (百期回望專輯), written by seven students to commemorate the special occasion.

Another regular publication is the school newspaper, The Courier (文苑), which has been published since 1968. Currently, 3 issues are produced each year, covering the school's major functions and featuring student contributions.

In commemoration of the school's 125th anniversary, the Queen's College Old Boys' Association published a limited-edition history of the school entitled Queen's College: Its History 1862-1987 in 1987. Its author, Gwenneth Stokes, whose husband John was the Principal of Queen's College from 1965 to 1970, spent 2 years researching the 494-page book in local archives and in the UK.

== Scandals ==
In 2006, it was reported that two Queen's College students robbed a Chinese Medicine Practitioner in his clinic in Shanghai Street, Jordan with cutters and towels soaked with chloroform.

Mr. Chiu Sin Hang, an assistant principal on probation, was involved in several scandals:

- Pressing students to support the police in school magazine: The Queen's College Political Reform Concern Group revealed that Assistant Principal Chiu Sin Hang requested a change in topic to "police force" in the latest The Yellow Dragon at that time, in the hopes of supporting the local police force which has suffered a negative image in the Umbrella Movement. The Yellow Dragon later released a statement confirming the request from Chiu and stated that principal Ms. Li Sui-wah rejected said request. This event caused outrage not just between students and alumni as it inflected students' freedom in expression and created unnecessary burden on the students in charge.
- Failure to declare interests attained in beer-drinking contest: Assistant Principal Chiu Sin Hang attended a dinner event held by the Queen's College Old Boys' Association in which he participated in a beer-drinking contest and prevailed. He won a travel coupon to Macau of around $5000 in value. It was alleged that Chiu did not declare the said prize to his senior or the Education Bureau, breaching the Civil Service Code and the Prevention of Bribery Ordinance, albeit the School Principal was attending the same event and noticing his winning the contest and the travel coupon.

== List of Alumni ==
=== Politicians, judges, diplomats, and military staff ===
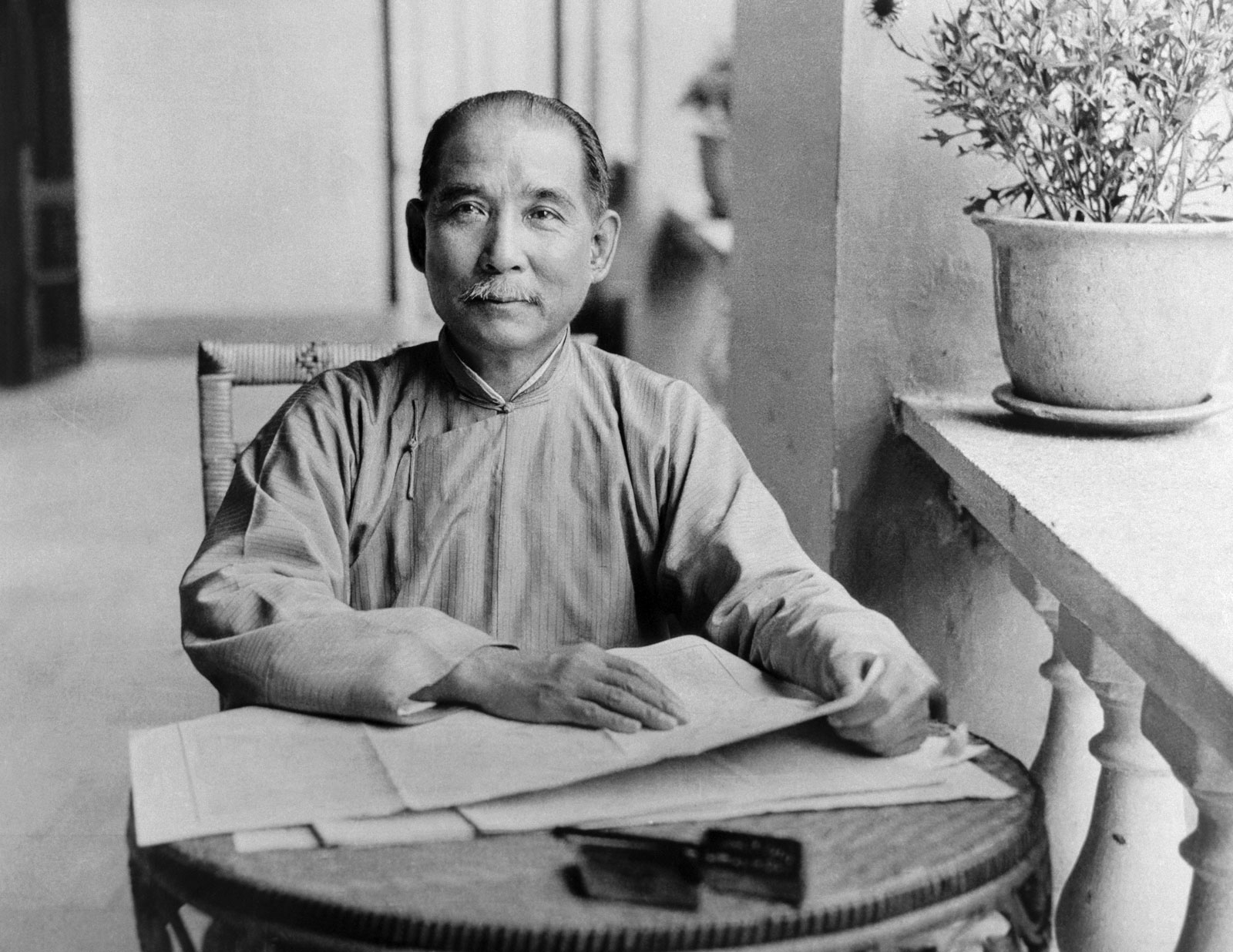
Dr. Sun Yat-sen

- Sun Yat-sen, the chief leader of the 1911 Xinhai Revolution, the founding Provisional President of the Republic of China. He has been recognized as the "Father of the Nation" by the Chinese in Taiwan, Hong Kong, and overseas; while being called the "Forerunner of the Revolution" by the People's Republic of China Government.
- Liao Zhongkai, major Chinese revolutionary leader, the executive member of the Kuomintang Central Committee, foreign minister, military minister, financial minister, and labour minister of the Republic of China. He was assassinated by the rightists in Guangzhou, 20 August 1925.
- Tang Shaoyi, diplomat, politician. He was the first Premier of the Republic of China, the first president of Shandong University, and an early overseas student who studied at Columbia University in New York. He was assassinated by the Kuomintang in 1938.
- Wang Ch'ung-hui, Judge of Permanent Court of International Justice, the League of Nations; Minister of Foreign Affairs, Minister of Justice, First Cabinet of the Republic of China, 1912.
- Chan Kam-tao (陳錦濤), Minister of Finance, First Cabinet of the Republic of China, of Dr. Sun's Southern Government in Guangzhou during the 1920s.
- Wen Tsung-yao, administrative director, Dr. Sun's Southern Government in Guangzhou during the 1920s.
- Luk King-fo (陸敬科), Head of the Bureau of Foreign Affairs, Dr. Sun's Southern Government in Guangzhou during the 1920s.
- Leung Lan-fan, China's first Consul General to Australia during the 1900s, and Superintendent of Customs in Guangzhou during the 1920s.
- Lo Man-kam, former Legislative Councillor and Executive Council Member.
- Ho Sai-lai (何世禮), General of the Republic of China Army; Chief Representative of China to the United Nations Security Council. He studied at British and French military academies.
- Raymond Wong Chok-mui (黃作梅), Second director of Xinhua News Agency-Hong Kong branch; founder of Xinhua's London branch. Member of Dongjiang Anti-Japanese Guerilla. The only Chinese Communist Party member to receive an MBE and invitation from King George VI to attend WWII Victory Parade in London.
- Henry Fok, the Vice Chairman of the National Committee of the Chinese People's Political Consultative Conference.
- Rafael Hui, Chief Secretary for Administration of the HKSAR Government (December 2005 - June 2007).
- Wong Yan Lung, Senior Counsel, Secretary for Justice of the HKSAR Government (December 2005 - June 2012).
- York Chow, Secretary for Health, Welfare, and Food, the HKSAR Government (Effective December 2005).
- Norman Chan, Ex-vice-president of Hong Kong Monetary Authority (1996–2005); vice-chairman of Standard Chartered Asia Pacific (2005-); Founding member of the think-tank Bauhinia Foundation Research Centre (2006); Chief Executive of Hong Kong Monetary Authority (Effective October 2009)
- Kwok Kwok-chuen (郭國全), Honorary Senior Research Fellow in University of Hong Kong, former Government Economist of Hong Kong Special Administrative Region, former Chief Regional Economist, East Asia, of the Standard Chartered Bank.
- Ronny Tong, Senior Counsel, former Legislative Councillor from the Article 45 Concern Group; former Chairman of the Hong Kong Bar Association.
- Szeto Wah, former Legislative Councillor, Chairman of the Hong Kong Alliance in Support of Patriotic Democratic Movements in China.
- Leong Che-hung, Executive Council Member.
- Peter Lai, First Chinese Secretary for Security before Handover; First Secretary for Security of HKSAR.
- Lam Woon-kwong, Director of the Chief Executive's Office of HKSAR (2002–2005), previously the Chairperson of the Equal Opportunities Commission.

=== Medical doctors ===
- Man-Kai Wan (尹文階, 1869-1927), one of the first Chinese doctors of Western Medicine in Hong Kong, the inaugural Chairman of the Hong Kong Chinese Medical Association (1920-1922, forerunner of Hong Kong Medical Association) and one of the founders of Hong Kong Sanatorium & Hospital He practiced Western Medicine with Sun Yat-sen in a joint clinic and sheltered Sun Yat-sen during the 1911 Revolution. His niece is Lee Sun Chau, one of the first female doctors of Western Medicine in China.
- Ko Wing-man, former Secretary for Food and Health of the HKSAR Government (2012–20)

=== Businessmen ===
- Ho Fook, businessman and philanthropist
- Ho Kai, founder, Hong Kong College of Medicine, predecessor of the University of Hong Kong
- Robert Ho Tung, businessman and philanthropist
- Stanley Ho, former chairman, Shun Tak Holdings Limited
- Kan Tung-po (簡東浦), co-founder, Bank of East Asia
- Lau Chu-pak, founder, Chinese General Chamber of Commerce
- Lee Hysan, founder, Hysan Development Company Limited, transformed Jardine's Hill into Lee Gardens
- Lo Cheung-shiu, comprador, Jardine Matheson & Co.
- Jehangir Hormusjee Ruttonjee, founded first brewery in Hong Kong; founder, Ruttonjee Hospital
- Tse Tsan-tai, co-founder, South China Morning Post
- B. Wong Tape (1875–1967), merchant, Dunedin, New Zealand

=== Academics ===
- Tony F. Chan, assistant director, Directorate for Mathematics and Physical Sciences, National Science Foundation; Professor, Computational & Applied Math Group, Department of Mathematics, UCLA. President of Hong Kong University of Science and Technology since 1 September 2009.
- Chan Sze Chi, religious scholar and one of the founders of the League of Social Democrats
- Chan Wai Yee (陳偉儀), Pro-vice-chancellor / Vice President, Professor and director of School of Biomedical Sciences, Master of CW Chu College, The Chinese University of Hong Kong.
- Edward K.Y. Chen (陳坤耀), vice-chancellor of Lingnan University, Hong Kong.
- Jack Cheng (鄭振耀) Pro-vice-chancellor / vice-president, professor of orthopaedics and traumatology, Chinese University of Hong Kong.
- Steven N. S. Cheung, well-known economist in Hong Kong, formerly Professor of Economics at the University of Hong Kong.
- Cheung Yau-kai (張佑啟), Honorary Professor of Engineering and Special Adviser to the vice-chancellor of The University of Hong Kong; formerly pro-vice-chancellor and acting deputy vice-chancellor.
- Chiang Mung, 18th President of Northwestern University; Former President, Purdue University and the John A. Edwardson Dean of its College of Engineering. Previously the Science and Technology Adviser to the Secretary of State, United States and the Arthur LeGrand Doty Professor of Electrical Engineering at Princeton University. 2013 Alan T. Waterman Award recipient.
- Fok Tai-fai (霍泰輝), Pro-vice-chancellor, the Chinese University of Hong Kong.
- Vincent Kwan Pun-Fong (關品方), associate director, HKU Zhejiang Institute of Research and Innovation, Hangzhou; Honorary Professor, The University of Hong Kong.
- Kwan Tze-wan (關子尹), Emeritus Professor, former Head of department, Department of Philosophy, Chinese University of Hong Kong.
- Vincent Lee Hon-leung (李漢良), Director of the School of Pharmacy, Chinese University of Hong Kong.
- Chi-Kwong Li, Ferguson Professor of Mathematics, The College of William and Mary
- Simon Shen (沈旭暉), international politics critic, Table-host of ROUNDTABLE, Adjunct Associate Professor, Institute of Asia-Pacific Studies, The Chinese University of Hong Kong.
- Joseph Sung Jao-yiu (沈祖堯), one of the most significant figures in Hong Kong's fighting with the SARS in 2003. He was the Associate Dean of the Faculty of Medicine, Chinese University of Hong Kong. Vice-chancellor and president of the Chinese University of Hong Kong (1 July 2010 to 31 December 2017).
- Tse Lai-Sing, Francis (謝勵誠), Vice President, Novartis Institutes for Biomedical Research; Adjunct Professor, Nankai University, Tianjin; Vice President & Chief Scientific Officer, Lab Testing Division, 上海药明康德新药开发有限公司.
- Wang Wenshan (王文山), sociologist, anarchist, student leader at the Peking University during the May Fourth Movement 1919. He contacted the Chinese communists and once met Vladimir Lenin in Moscow.
- Wong Kai-chi (黃繼持), writer, translator, literary critic of Chinese literature, former Head of department, Department of Chinese Language and Literature, Chinese University of Hong Kong.
- Wong Kwok-pun, Lawrence (黃國彬), Professor at the Department of Translation of Lingnan University in Hong Kong. His famous Chinese poem 'On Listening to Chan's Zither Performance' (translated from the Chinese title '聽陳蕾士的琴箏'), written in the 1980s, has been one of the prescribed texts of the Chinese Language syllabus of the Hong Kong Certificate of Education Examination from 1993 to 2006.
- Yuen Kwok-yung, Henry Fok Professor in Infectious Diseases, chair and Head of the Department of Microbiology at the Faculty of Medicine, University of Hong Kong
- Chan Ka Shing Kevin (陳家承), Professor & Associate Dean (Research and Postgraduate Studies), Department of Psychology, Faculty of Education and Human Development, EdUHK.

== List of Headmasters and Principals ==
- Dr. Frederick Stewart (1862–1881)
- Dr. G. H. Bateson Wright (黎璧臣, 1881–1909)
- Mr. Thomas Kirkman Dealy, FRGS, FEIS, FCS, DRF (Paris) (狄吏, 1909–1918)
- Mr. Bertram Tanner, ISO (丹雅, 1918–1925)
- Mr. Alfred Herbert Crook, OBE, FRGS (祈祿, 1925–1930)
- Mr. Francis Joseph de Rome, MBE (狄隆, 1930–1939)
- Mr. M. G. O'Connor (Acting) (1939–1941)
- Mr. L. G. Morgan (Acting) (1947)
- Mr. J. J. Ferguson (Acting) (1947)
- Mr. Harry Norman Williamson, OBE (威廉遜, 1947–1961)
- Mr. Cheung King-pak (張經柏, 1961–1964)
- Mr. Wong Yee-wa (Acting) (1964)
- Mr. F. C. Gamble (金寶, 1964–1965)
- Mr. John Stokes (司徒莊, 1965–1970)
- Mr. Raymond Huang (黃勵文, 1970–1973)
- Mr. William Cheng Hsü-ning (鄭旭寧, 1973–1976)
- Mr. Timothy Yung (榮德淵, 1976–1982)
- Mr. Chew Tung-sing (趙東成, 1982–1987)
- Mr. Kong Shiu-chung (江紹忠, 1987–1994)
- Mr. Lee Kar-hung (李家鴻, 1994–2000)
- Ms. Kitty Cheung Lam Lai-king (張林麗琼, 2000–2003)
- Mr. Vincent Li Lok-yin (李樂然, 2003–2013)
- Ms. Li Sui-wah (李瑞華, 2013–2018)
- Ms. Leung Yvetta Ruth (梁路德, 2018-2024)
- Mr. Chan Cheung-wai Eric (陳祥偉, 2024-)

== List of Head Prefects ==
- Leung Fok Tin (1911)
- Tsang On Wing (1912)
- Tang Shu Ham (1913)
- C.O. Daneng (1914)
- A.M. Abbas (1915)
- S.D. Ismah (1916)
- Leung Chuek Hin (1916)
- Ng Ming (1917)
- S.O. Snail (1918)
- Tsoi Tse Shek (1919)
- Wei Tat (1920)
- Iu Tak Cheuk (1921)
- Ho Tung Fan (1922)
- Ching Ming Chow (1923)
- Cheng Iu Man (1924)
- Frank Grose (1925)
- Hu Pak Mi (1926)
- Cheung King Pak (1927)
- Fung Tin Yau (1928)
- Mok Ying Kee (1929)
- V.V. Soonderam (1930)
- Arch E Hunt (1931)
- Hung Ng Chiu (1932)
- Lai Kee Leung (1933)
- Mok Kai Wing (1934)
- S Lee (1935)
- Lo Kan (1936)
- Hung Shek Chiu (1937)
- Au Hung Cho (1938)
- Ng Shun Leung (1939)
- Lam Sui Kwan (1940)
- Wong Yue Shing (1941)
- Tso Shiu Chiu (1953)
- Tse Siu Man (1954)
- Tong Tak Kim (1955)
- Ko Shan Ling (1956)
- Kwok Yau Yan (1957)
- Leung Sung Shan (1958)
- Lau Hon Shung (1959)
- Lee Shew Lai (1960)
- Yue Shu Hoi (1961)
- Tam Lam Sang (1962)
- Wong Chak Po (1963)
- Chow Chee Cheung (1964)
- Wong Sui Leung (1965)
- Au Wai Hin (1966)
- Fung Chuen Fai (1967)
- Chu Kwong Yue (1968)
- Poon Tek Cheung (1969)
- Lee Shu Wing (1970)
- Leung Chi Chiu (1971)
- Chen Chung I (1972)
- Chung Chi Wai (1973)
- Li Tin Chiu (1974)
- Ng Kwok Fan (1975)
- Poon Chung Ho (1976)
- Chan Che Tung (1977)
- Tse Kin Wah (1978)
- Tang Shu Wing (1979)
- Yau Tsz Kok (1980)
- Lee Kwok Lun (1981)
- Yip Kam Keung (1982)
- Wong Yan Lung (1981–82)
- Salleh Siddique (1982–83)
- Chan Ho Yin (1983–84)
- Lee Kang Yin (1984–85)
- Chan Tze Wang (1985–86)
- Chow Wai Shum (1986–87)
- Ma Yu Moon (1987–88)
- Kan Kin Hong (1988–89)
- Chang Chi Ho (1989–90)
- Yip Kam Leung (1990–91)
- Yip Wing Kong (1991–92)
- Chung Chong Sun (1992–93)
- Tsui Siu Kay Gordon (1993–94)
- Chi Yuk Lun (1994–95)
- Chiang Mung (1995–96)
- Ko Cheuk Hin (1996–97)
- Cheung Wan Chi (1997–98)
- Tong Chi Keung (1998–99)
- Lam Shi (1999-2000)
- Lee Wing Cheong (2000–01)
- Lee Chun Hong (2001–02)
- Chiu Kwun Sau (2002–03)
- Cheung Ming Fun (2003–04)
- Cheung Yik Nang (2004–05)
- Tse Cheuk Yin Andrew (2005–06)
- Ko Wang Yui (2006–07)
- Chia Chi Fung (2007–08)
- Chan Tin Yau (2008–09)
- Lee Tat Fung Billy (2009–10)
- Ng Chi Ho Gary (2010–11)
- Tse Tak Mong Desmond (2011–12)
- Leung Ka Kei (2012–13)
- Mak Li Shun (2013–14)
- Hon Pun Yat (2014–15)
- Choy Wai Chak (2015–16)
- Yuen Wai Him (2016–17)
- Lau Pok Wai (2017–18)
- Ng Shing Him (2018–19)
- Fung Wing Kan (2019–20)
- Pang Ho (2020–21)
- Yeung Ho Eden (2021–22)
- Hu Wang Hei (2022–23)
- Chun Yuk Hei (2023–24)
- Kwong Yu Chung (2024–25)

== Queen's College History Museum ==
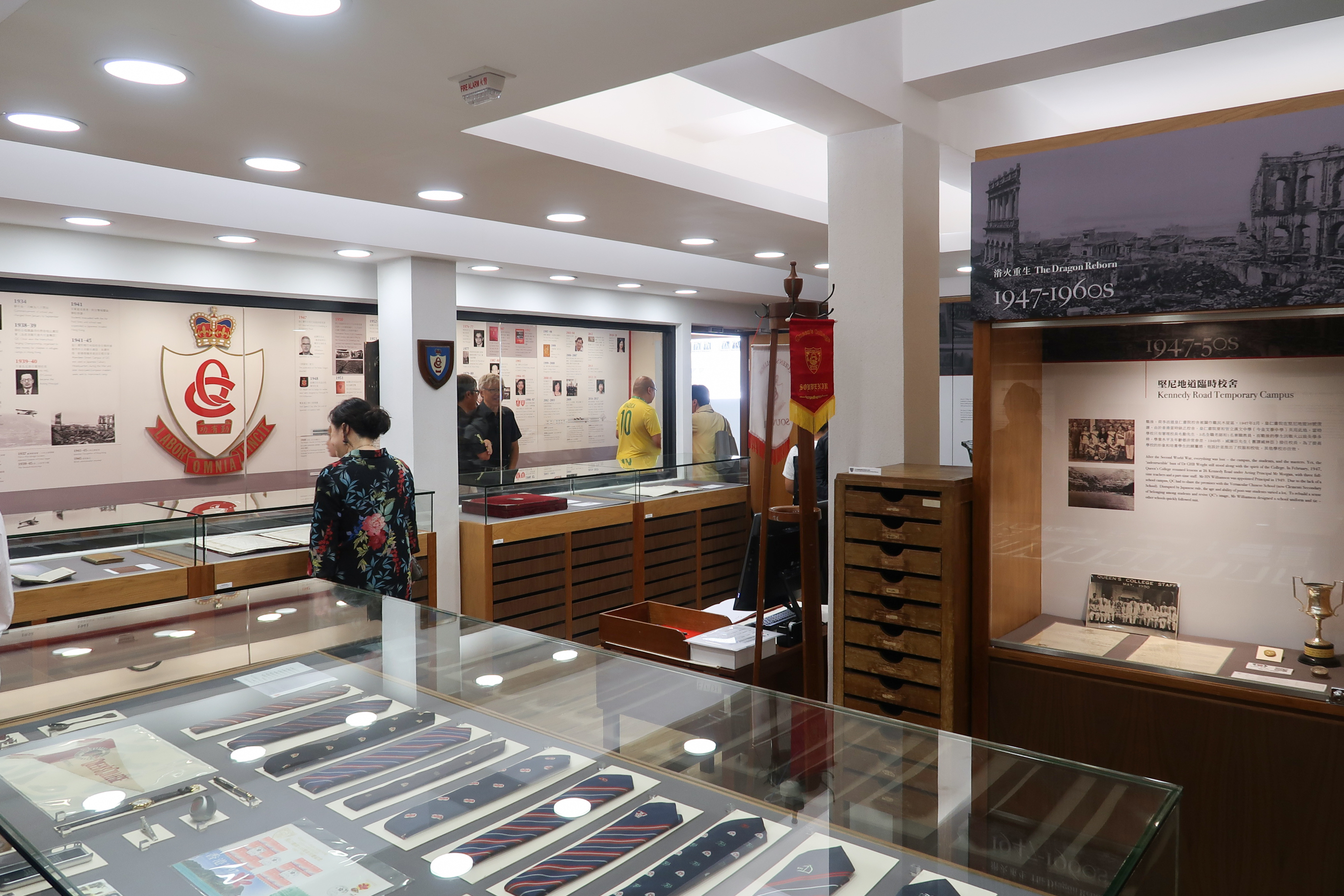
History Museum Interior

History

The Queen's College History Gallery was established in 2013 to illustrate the history of the school and to serve as an archive for preserving and restoring school-related artifacts, documents and relevant publications. To give the 4000-piece strong collection and exhibition a more favourable environment, a new purpose-built museum converted from several classrooms was completed and opened on 23 January 2017. Renamed the Queen's College History Museum, it currently hosts a permanent exhibition entitled "From Gough Street to Causeway Road: Change and Continuity of Queen's College" curated by Old Boys Honorary Curators.

List of Special Exhibitions

- 2017-18 - Special Collections: Photos, Reports, Publications & Correspondences
- 2018-19 - The Early Days of Queen's College
- 2019-20 - 120th Anniversary of The Yellow Dragon
- 2020-21 - Brotherhood Over a Century: Centenary of the QC Old Boys' Association
- 2021-22 - Treasures of a School History Museum: 160 Years of Queen's College in 16 Objects
