= Po Hing Fong =

Street in Sheung Wan, Hong Kong

Coordinates: 22.284320°N 114.147775°E

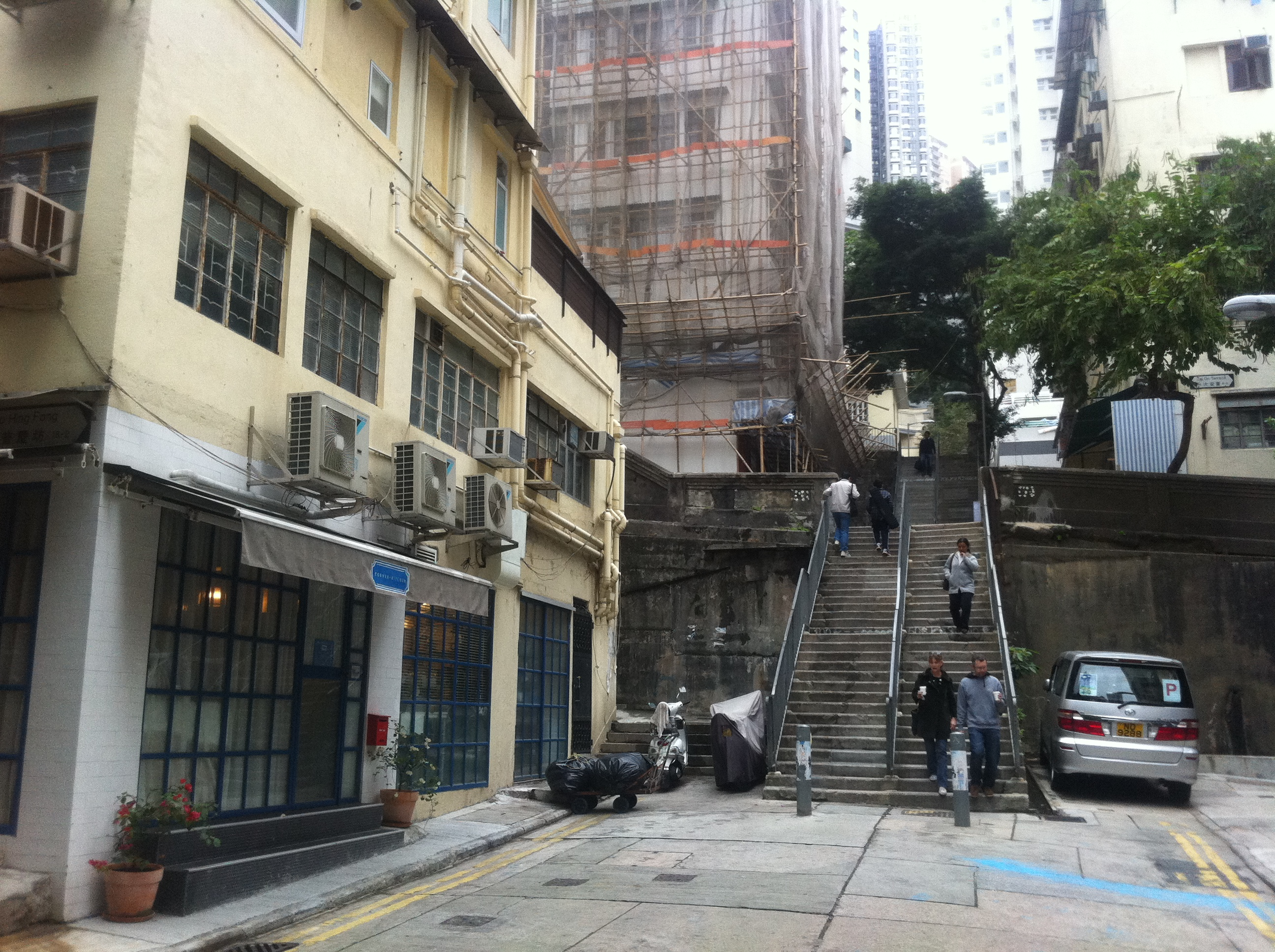
- Traditional Chinese: 普慶坊
- Simplified Chinese: 普庆坊
Transcriptions
Standard Mandarin
- Hanyu Pinyin: Pǔqìng Fang
Yue: Cantonese
- Yale Romanization: Pou2 hing3 fong1

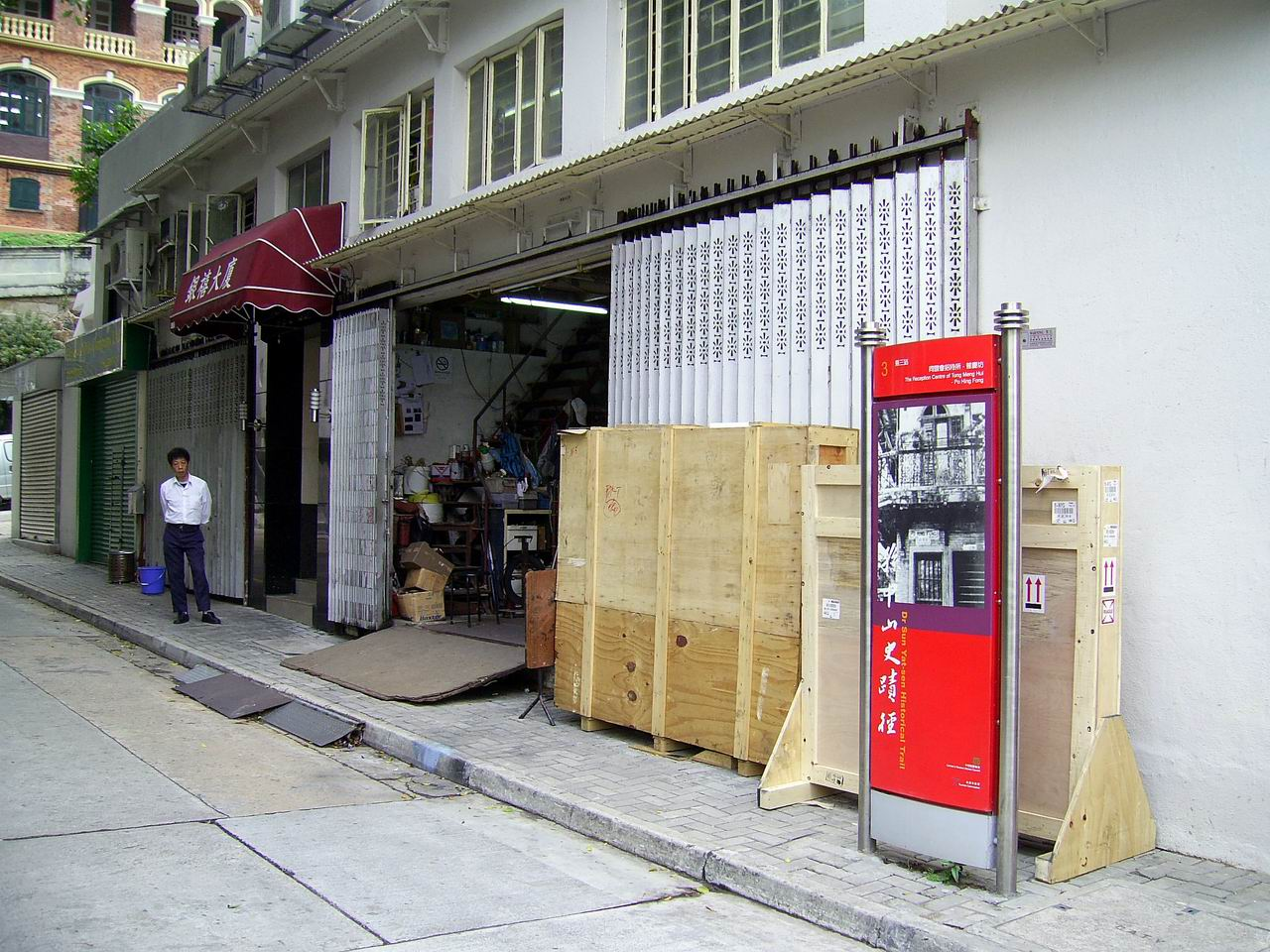
Marker of the Dr Sun Yat-sen Historical Trail at the Original site of the Tongmenghui Reception Centre, in Po Hing Fong

Po Hing Fong is a cul-de-sac in Sheung Wan, Hong Kong.

In recent years, it has transformed into a funky new neighbourhood nicknamed PoHo, following an influx of artists and quirky shops, including bohemian cafés, boutiques, and design studios.

== History ==
Po Hing Fong was the original site of one of the Tongmenghui Reception Centres, an anti-Qing revolutionary organisation led by Dr. Sun Yat-sen, to provide refuge for revolutionaries.

Chau Siu-ki, a prominent Hong Kong businessman, used to own two houses in Po Hing Fong. Sir Cecil Clementi, the then Governor of Hong Kong, lived in one of Chau's houses when he was a civil servant.

On 17 July 1925, shortly before 9 a.m., an extensive wall behind the houses near the Caine Road-Ladder Street end of the street collapsed after having been severely undermined by the heavy rains of the previous three days. The ensuing flood swept away seven houses (collectively inhabited by a total of 30 families) in Po Hing Fong. Nearly 80 people were killed in the disaster – including Chau Siu-ki and many of his family members. His son, Chau Tsun-nin, miraculously survived after having fortuitously fallen from his bed under a table which supported the weight of the bricks. Chau Tsun-nin later became a member of the Executive Council and Legislative Council of Hong Kong.

== Notable residents ==
- Sir Cecil Clementi, Governor of Hong Kong
- Chau Siu-ki, Hong Kong insurance and shipping magnate, real estate developer, and member of the Legislative Council.
- Sir Chau Tsun-nin, barrister, businessman, and member of the Executive Council and Legislative Council.

== See also ==
- List of streets and roads in Hong Kong
