= Chinese General Chamber of Commerce =

Hong Kong non-profit organization

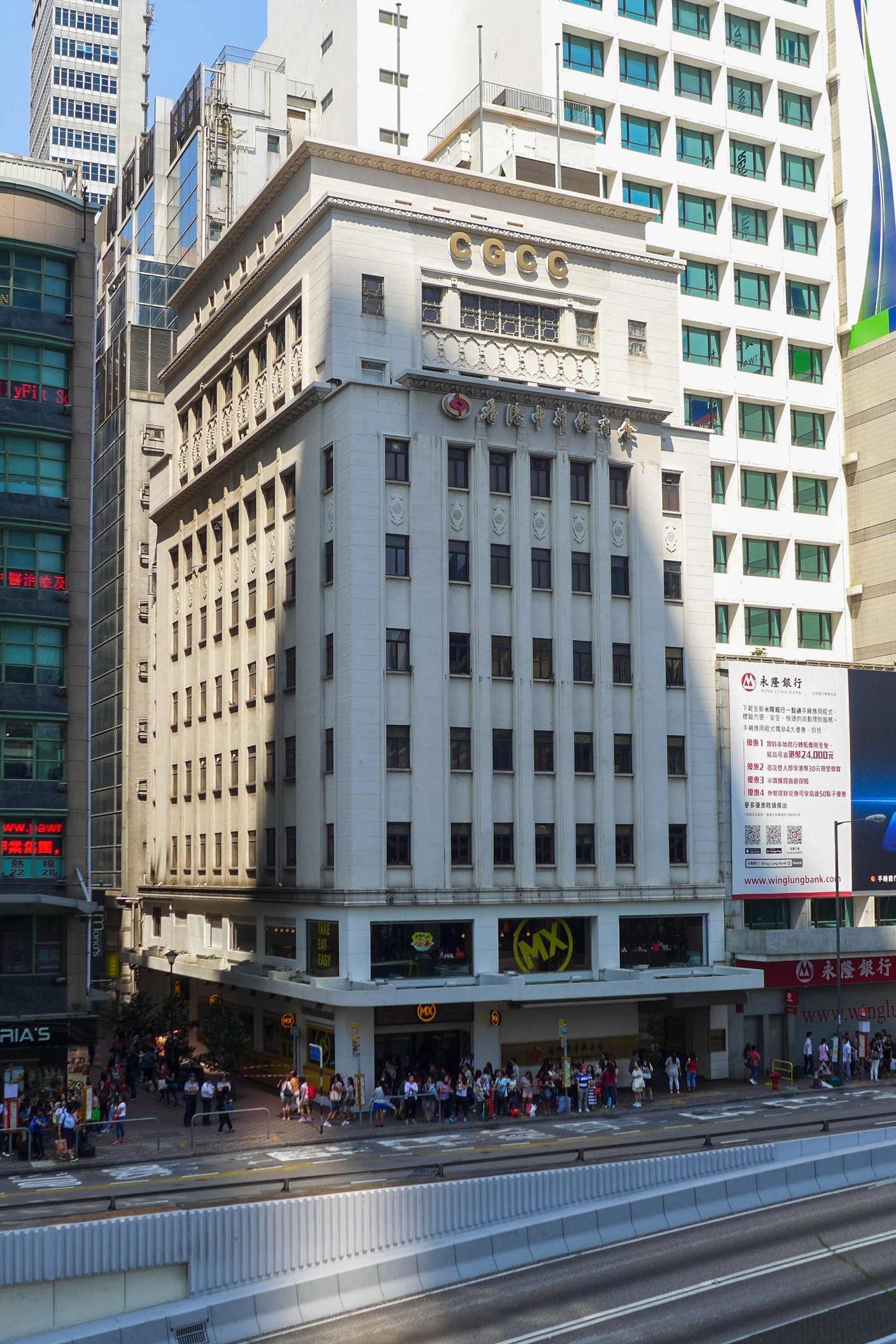
- Chinese General Chamber of Commerce Building
- Abbreviation: CGCCHK
- Formation: 1900; 126 years ago
- Legal status: Not-for-profit organisation
- Purpose: Chambers of commerce of Hong Kong Chinese businessmen
- Location: 4/F., 24-25 Connaught Road Central, Central, Hong Kong
- Region served: Hong Kong
- Members: 6,000
- Chairman: Dr. Charles Yeung
- Website: www.cgcc.org.hk

The Chinese General Chamber of Commerce (CGCCHK; Chinese: 香港中華總商會) is a non-profit organization of local Chinese firms and businessmen based in Hong Kong. It was founded in 1900 by Ho Fook and Lau Chu-pak, two prominent leaders of the Chinese community during the colonial period. It is one of the oldest and largest chambers of commerce in Hong Kong. At present, the Chamber has a membership of over 6,000, comprising association, company and individual members.

Largely regarded as a pro-Beijing group, it has representative in the Legislative Council of Hong Kong through the Commercial (Second) functional constituency and also many other political sectors such as the Election Committee which is responsible for the Chief Executive election, Hong Kong Monetary Authority, Information Technology and Broadcasting Bureau, and Education and Manpower Bureau. The current holder of the seat in the Legislative Council is Martin Liao.
