= Comprador =

Person who acts as an agent for certain foreign organizations

comprador
- Traditional Chinese: 買辦
- Simplified Chinese: 买办
Transcriptions
Standard Mandarin
- Hanyu Pinyin: mǎibàn
Yue: Cantonese
- Jyutping: maai5 baan6

Alternative Chinese name
- Traditional Chinese: 江擺渡
- Simplified Chinese: 江摆渡
Transcriptions
Standard Mandarin
- Hanyu Pinyin: jiāngbǎidù
Yue: Cantonese
- Jyutping: gong1 baai2 dou6

Second alternative Chinese name
- Chinese: 康白度
Transcriptions
Standard Mandarin
- Hanyu Pinyin: kāngbǎidù
Yue: Cantonese
- Jyutping: hong1 baak6 dou6

A comprador or compradore (English: /kɒmprəˈdɔːr/) is a "person who acts as an agent for foreign organizations engaged in investment, trade, or economic or political exploitation." An example of a comprador would be a native manager for a European business house in East and South East Asia, and, by extension, social groups that play broadly similar roles in other parts of the world.

== Etymology and usage ==
The term comprador, a Portuguese word that means buyer, derives from the Latin comparare, which means to procure. The original usage of the word in East Asia referred to a native servant in European households in Guangzhou in southern China or in the neighboring Portuguese colony at Macao - such persons went to market to barter their employers' wares. The term then evolved to mean the native contract-suppliers who worked for foreign companies in East Asia or the native managers of firms in East Asia. Compradors held important positions in southern China - buying and selling tea, silk, cotton and yarn for foreign corporations and working in foreign-owned banks. Robert Hotung (1862–1956), who worked in the late-nineteenth century as a comprador of the trading conglomerate Jardine, Matheson & Co., allegedly became the richest man in Hong Kong by the age of 35. The Hong Kong firm of Li & Fung, founded in 1906, partly functioned as a Canton comprador in its early stages.

Marxist theoreticians in the 20th century applied the term comprador bourgeoisie to similar trading-classes in regions outside East Asia.

With the emergence or the re-emergence of globalization, the term "comprador" has reentered the lexicon to denote trading groups and classes in the developing world in subordinate but mutually-advantageous relationships with metropolitan capital. The Egyptian Marxist Samir Amin (1931–2018) discussed the role of compradors in the contemporary global economy in his work. In addition, the Indian economist Ashok Mitra (1928–2018) labelled the owners and managers of firms attached to the Indian software industry as compradors. Growing identification of the software industry in India with comprador "qualities" has led to the labeling of certain persons associated with the industry as "dot.compradors".

Marxist terminology counterposes a comprador bourgeoisie, perceived as the serving the interests of foreign imperial powers, to a national bourgeoisie, which is considered as opposing foreign imperialism and promoting the independence of its own country and, as such, could be, under some circumstances, a short-term ally of socialist revolutionaries.

Mikhail Delyagin has characterised the 21st-century Russian state as in itself a comprador in a system of comprador capitalism.

Irish historian Dr. Conor McCabe, building on analyses present in the writings of early 20th Century Irish socialists like James Connolly, Peadar O'Donnell and Brian O'Neill, has used the concept of "comprador capitalism" to help explain the development of the Irish financial sector and the Irish economy more broadly.

== Notable compradors ==
=== China ===
- Chang Kia-ngau (Shanghai)
- Zheng Guanying
- Liu Hongsheng
- Tong King-sing (Guangdong)
- Ho Tung (Hong Kong)

== See also ==
- Factor (agent)
- List of trading companies
- Social structure of China
- Protégé system
- Capitulations of the Ottoman Empire
- Collaborationism
