= Central and Western Heritage Trail =

Heritage trail in Hong Kong

The Central and Western Heritage Trail is a Heritage Trail in Hong Kong, that was designed by the Antiquities and Monuments Office of the Leisure and Cultural Services Department.

It covers the Central and Western District of Hong Kong and consists of 3 parts:

- The Central Route (3 sections)
- The Sheung Wan Route (2 sections)
- The Western District and the Peak Route (2 sections)

== The Central Route ==
=== Section A ===
Name	Location	Notes	Photographs	Ref
A1 - Edinburgh Place				
A2 - Statue Square				
A3 - Cenotaph	Chater Road			
1 - Old Hong Kong Club Building	3A Chater Road/3 Jackson Road, between Chater Road and Connaught Road Central	Built in 1897, demolished in 1981 to make place for the present building.		
A4 - Old Supreme Court (Legislative Council Building)	8 Jackson Road, on Statue Square	Declared Monument		
A5 - Commemorative Plaque for the Old Site of Cricket Club	Chater Garden, directly east of the Legislative Council building			
2 - Old Site of Murray House	Now the site of the Bank of China Tower. Murray House was dismantled and rebuilt in Stanley			
A6 - Commemorative Plaque for the Old Site of City Hall	The site is now occupied by the HSBC Main Building.			
3 - Old Site of Murray Parade Ground				
A7 - Former French Mission Building (Court of Final Appeal)	1 Battery Path	Declared Monument		
A8 - St. John's Cathedral	4 Garden Road	Declared Monument		

=== Section B ===
Name	Location	Notes/References	Photographs
B9 - Flagstaff House (Museum of Tea Ware)	10 Cotton Tree Drive, within the Hong Kong Park	Declared Monument	
B10 - Rawlinson House (Cotton Tree Drive Marriage Registry)	19 Cotton Tree Drive	Grade II Historic Building	
B11 - Cassels Block (Hong Kong Visual Arts Centre)	7A Kennedy Road, within the Hong Kong Park	Grade II Historic Building	
B12 - North and West Blocks of St. Joseph's College	7 Kennedy Road	Declared Monuments	
B13 - 28 Kennedy Road (Office of the Former Chief Executives of the HKSAR)	28 Kennedy Road	Grade I Historic Building	
B14 - First Church of Christ, Scientist, HK	31 MacDonnell Road	Grade II Historic Building	
B15 - St. Paul's Co-educational College	33 MacDonnell Road	Grade III Historic Building	
B16 - Hong Kong Zoological and Botanical Gardens	Upper Albert Road		
B17 - Main Building, the Helena May	Garden Road	Declared Monument	
4 - Peak Tram Terminus	33 Garden Road		

=== Section C ===
Name	Location	Notes/References	Photographs
C18 - Government House	Upper Albert Road	Declared Monument	
C19 - Catholic Cathedral of Immaculate Conception	16 Caine Road	Grade I Historic Building	
C20 - Victoria Prison	16 Old Bailey Street	Declared Monument	
C21 - Former Central Magistracy	1 Arbuthnot Road	Declared Monument	
C22 - Central Police Station	Hollywood Road	Declared Monument	
C23 - Original Site of Heng Yian Lou Western Restaurant	2 Lyndhurst Terrace		
C24 - Original Site of the Zhongguo Ribao (China Daily) Office	24 Stanley Street		
C25 - Commemorative Plaque for Dr. Jose Rizal	Century Square, 1-13 D'Aguilar Street		
C26 - Original Site of Hejizhan	24 Wellington Street		
C27 - Old Dairy Farm Building	2 Lower Albert Road	Grade II Historic Building. Houses the Fringe Club and the Foreign Correspondents' Club	
C28 - Bishop's House	1 Lower Albert Road	Grade I Historic Building	
C29 - St. Paul's Church	Glenealy		
C30 - Duddell Street Steps and Gas Lamps	Duddell Street	Declared Monument	
5 - Old Site of Pedder Street Clock Tower	Junction of Queen's Road Central and Pedder Street	Demolished in 1913	
C31 - Pedder Building	12 Pedder Street	Grade II Historic Building	
C32 - Commemorative Plaque for the Original Waterfront in 1841	Central Building		
C33 - Commemorative Plaque for the Praya Reclamation of 1843-65	Chater House, 11 Chater Road. Plaque located on Pedder Street facade.		
C34 - Commemorative Plaque for the Praya Reclamation of 1890-1904	Chater House, 11 Chater Road		
6 - Old Site of the General Post Office	Between Connaught Road Central, Pedder Street and Des Voeux Road Central	Demolished in the 1970s. Present site of the World-Wide House.	

== The Sheung Wan Route ==
=== Section B ===
Name	Location	Notes/References	Photographs
1 - Old Site of the Central Fire Station	Des Voeux Road Central	Location of the Hang Seng Bank Building	
2 - Central Market	80 Des Voeux Road Central, Central	Grade III Historic Building	
3 - Pottinger Street		Nicknamed Stone Slabs Street (石板街)	
4 - Original Site of the Hong Kong Headquarters of the Xingzhonghui (Revive China Society)	13 Staunton Street		
5 - Muslim Mosque	30 Shelley Street, Sheung Wan	Grade I Historic Building. Jamia Mosque.	
6 - Ohel Leah Synagogue	70 Robinson Road, at the junction with Castle Road	Grade I Historic Building	
7 - London Mission Building	78 and 80 Robinson Road	Grade III Historic Building. Now a private clubhouse.	
8 - Kom Tong Hall	7 Castle Road, Central	Grade II Historic Building. Houses the Dr. Sun Yat-sen Museum since December 2006	
9 - Original Site of the Daoji Mission House	59 Hollywood Road		
10 - Old Site of the Alice Memorial Hospital and Hong Kong College of Medicine	77-81 Hollywood Road		
11 - Original Site of the Furen Literary Society	Pak Tsz Lane		
12 - Site of the school where Yeung Ku-wan was assassinated by Qing agents	52 Gage Street, corner of Aberdeen Street		
13 - Original Site of Yang Yao Ji - meeting place for "The Four Bandits"	24 Gough Street (original address is at 6 Gough Street)		
14 - Commemorative Plaque for Dr. James Legge	44 Gough Street		
15 - Original Site of the Central School	44 Gough Street		
16 - Original Site of the Queen's College	Aberdeen Street		
17- Original Site of the American Congregational Mission Preaching House	2 Bridges Street (now Bridges Street Market)		

=== Section A ===
Name	Location	Notes/References	Photographs
18 - Man Mo Temple	124-130 Hollywood Road	Grade I Historic Building	
19 - Chinese Young Men's Christian Association of Hong Kong (Chinese Y.M.C.A)	51 Bridges Street		
20 - Old Pathological Institute (Hong Kong Museum of Medical Sciences)	2 Caine Lane	Declared Monument	
21 - Old Site of the Police Officers' Quarters - Caine Road	Between Caine Road and Seymour Road	The site has been turned into a park, the Caine Road Garden.	
22 - Hop Yat Church	2 Bonham Road	Grade II Historic Building	
23 - One of the Original Sites of Tongmenghui (United League) Reception Centre	Po Hing Fong		
24 - Commemorative Plaque for the Outbreak of the Bubonic Plague in 1894	Blake Garden		
25 - Kwong Fook I Tsz	Tai Ping Shan Street		
26 - Tai Ping Shan Street			
27 - Tung Wah Hospital	12 Po Yan Street	The Main Block is a Grade III Historic Building	
28 - Hollywood Road			
29 - Old Site of the Possession Point (Shui Hang Hau)	Hollywood Road Park, near Possession Street		
30 - Old Site of the Tai Tat Tei	Hollywood Road Park		
31 - Old Site of the Ko Shing Theatre	117 Queen's Road West	The theatre was demolished in 1973.	
32 - Bonham Strand			
33 - Old Site of the Nam Pak Hong Union	Bonham Strand West		
34 - Old Site of the Western Market (South Block) (Sheung Wan Complex)	345 Queen's Road Central	The South Block, built in 1858, was demolished in 1980. It was replaced by Sheung Wan Complex.	
35 - Western Market (North Block)	323 Des Voeux Road Central	Declared Monument	

== The Western District and the Peak Route ==
Western District comprises three small districts namely Sai Ying Pun, Shek Tong Tsui and Kennedy Town.

=== Section A ===
Name	Location	Notes/References	Photographs
1 - Peak Tram Terminus	33 Garden Road		
2 - Old Peak Café	121 Peak Road, the Peak	Grade II Historic Building. Renamed The Peak Lookout in 2001.	
3 - Gate Lodge of the Former Mountain Lodge	Mount Austin Road, the Peak	Declared Monument	
4 - Old Site of the Mountain Lodge	Lugard Road, the Peak	The building was demolished in 1946. Now the site of Victoria Peak Garden	
5 - Pinewood Battery	Lung Fu Shan Country Park		
6 - Boundary Stone, City of Victoria	Hatton Road, 400 m from its start at Kotewall Road		
7 - Stone House	15 Kotewall Road, Mid-Levels	Grade III Historic Building. Now a private residence.	

=== Section B ===
Name	Location	Notes/References	Photographs
8 - Old Halls, the University of Hong Kong	Mid-Levels	Old Halls is a collective name given in 1966 to Lugard, Eliot and May Halls. Only Eliot and May Halls remain.	
9 - Main Building, the University of Hong Kong	Mid-Levels	The exterior of the building is a Declared Monument	
10 - Hung Hing Ying Building, the University of Hong Kong	Mid-Levels	The exterior of the building is a Declared Monument	
11 - Elliot Pumping Station and Filters Workmen's Quarters	Pok Fu Lam Road, Kennedy Town	Grade II Historic Building	
12 - Former Fung Ping Shan Museum (University Museum and Art Gallery, the University of Hong Kong)	94 Bonham Road	The Fung Ping Shan Building is a Grade II Historic Building	
13 - Tang Chi Ngong Building, the University of Hong Kong	Mid-Levels	The exterior of the building is a Declared Monument	
14 - King's College	63A Bonham Road, Sai Ying Pun	Grade II Historic Building	
15 - Kau Yan Church	97A High Street, Sai Ying Pun	Grade III Historic Building	
16 - Old Tsan Yuk Maternity Hospital	36A Western Street, Sai Ying Pun	Grade III Historic Building. Named "Western District Community Centre" since 1973.	
17 - Main Building of St. Stephen's Girls' College	2 Lyttelton Road, Mid-Levels	Declared Monument	
18 - Old Site of Diocesan Boys' School	9A Bonham Road	Now the Bonham Road Government Primary School	
19 - Old Lunatic Asylum (Chinese Block)	45 Eastern Street, Sai Ying Pun	Grade II Historic Building. Now the Eastern Street Methadone Clinic.	
20 - Old Mental Hospital	2 High Street, Sai Ying Pun	The façade is a Grade I Historic Building. Now part of the Sai Ying Pun Community Complex.	
21 - Upper Levels Police Station	1F High Street, Sai Ying Pun	Grade III Historic Building. Now used as the Crime Hong Kong Island Regional Headquarters.	
22 - St. Louis School	179 Third Street, Sai Ying Pun	Grade III Historic Building	
23 - Ex-Western Fire Station	12 Belcher's Street, Kennedy Town	Grade III Historic Building. Converted into the Po Leung Kuk Chan Au Big Yan Home for the Elderly.	
24 - Fok Hing Tong, Hong Kong Society for the Promotion of Virtue	8-9 Tai Pak Terrace		
25 - Lo Pan Temple	15 Ching Lin Terrace, Kennedy Town	Grade I Historic Building	
