= D'Aguilar Street =

Street in Central, Hong Kong

Coordinates: 22.28112°N 114.15552°E

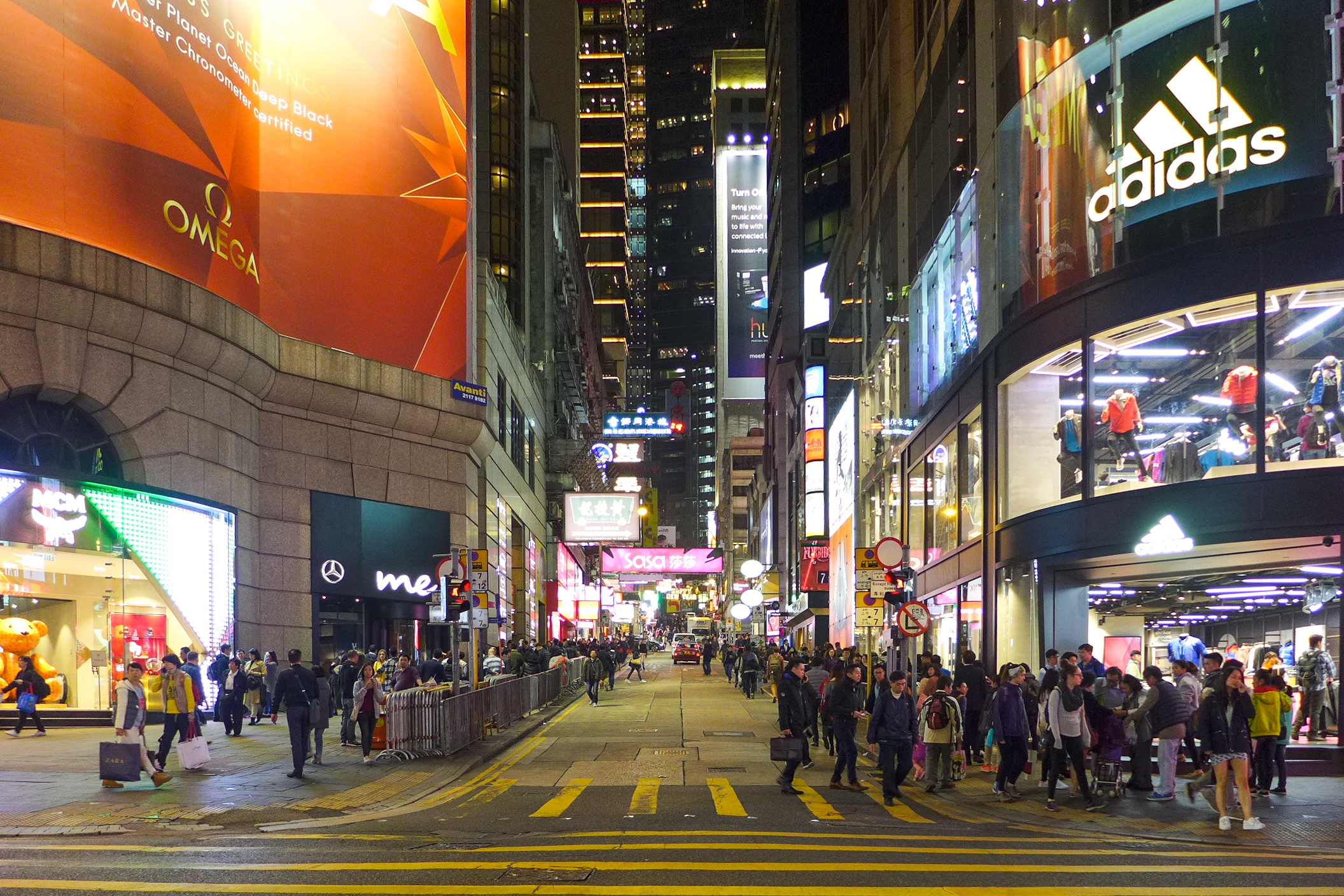
Intersection of the lower end of D'Aguilar Street with Queen's Road in 2016

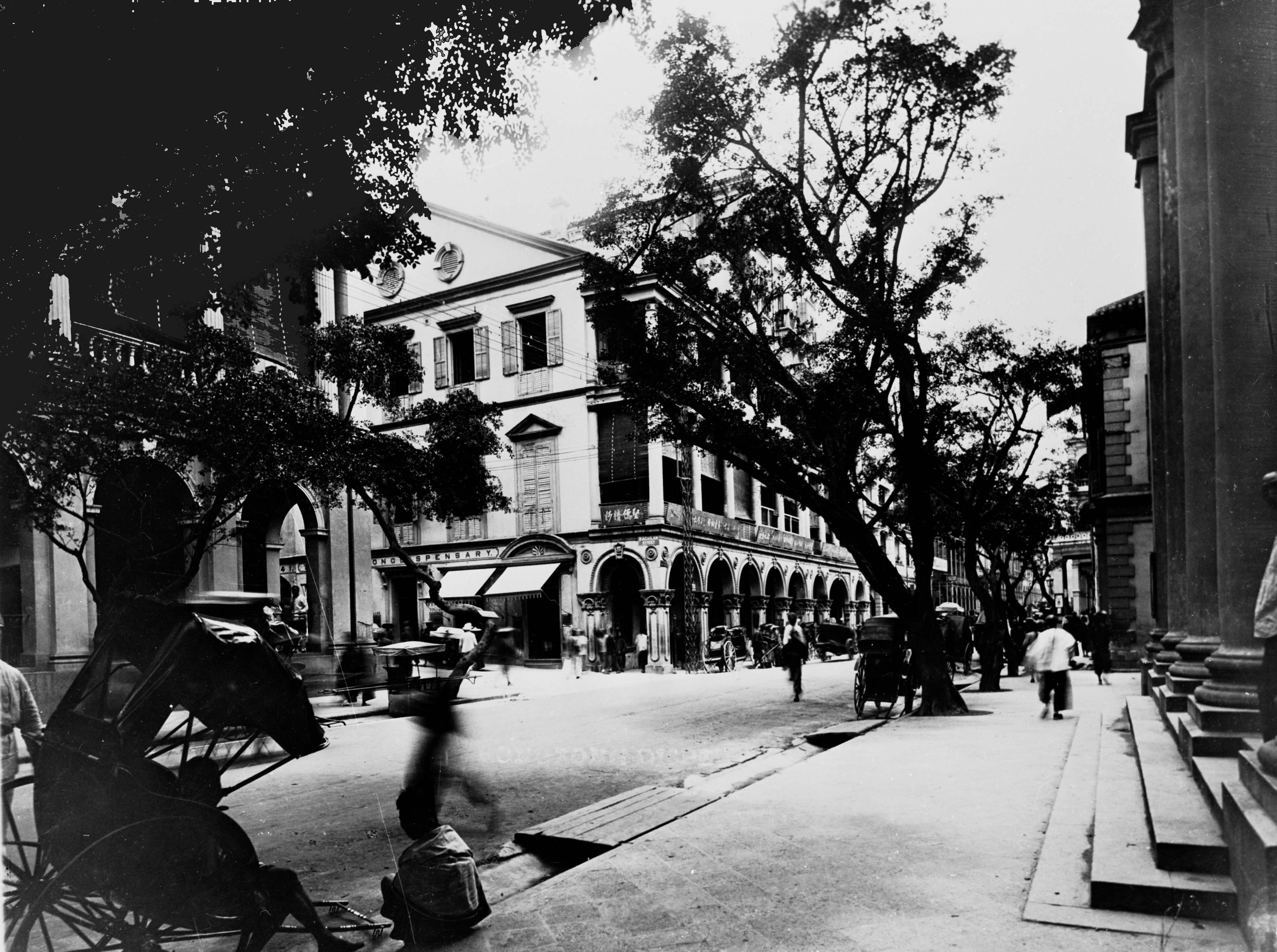
Intersection of the lower end of D'Aguilar Street with Queen's Road in 1890. The building at the corner with arcades was the first generation of the Hong Kong Club Building.

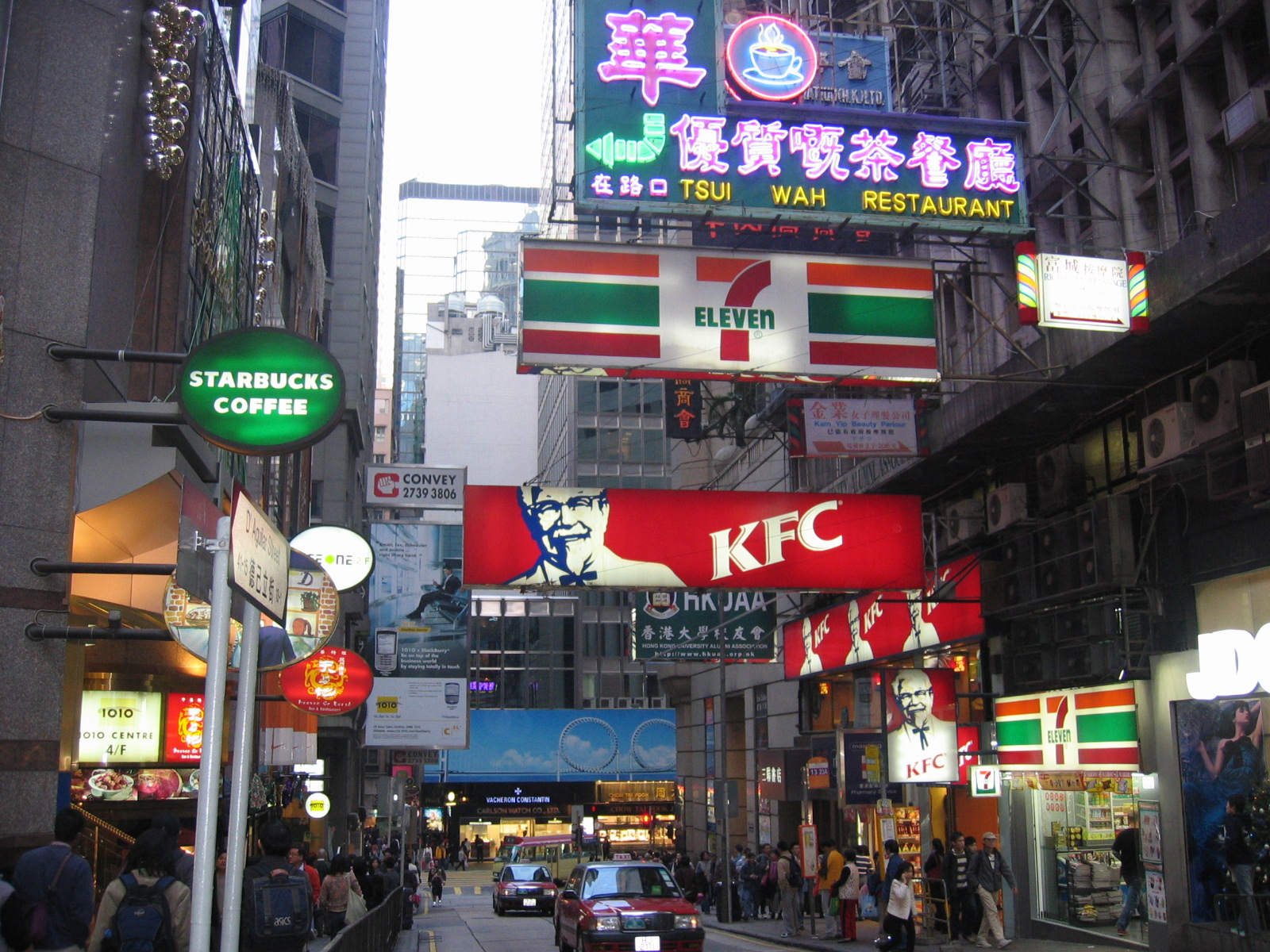
Lower section of D'Aguilar Street in 2005, with Queen's Road Central visible in the background.

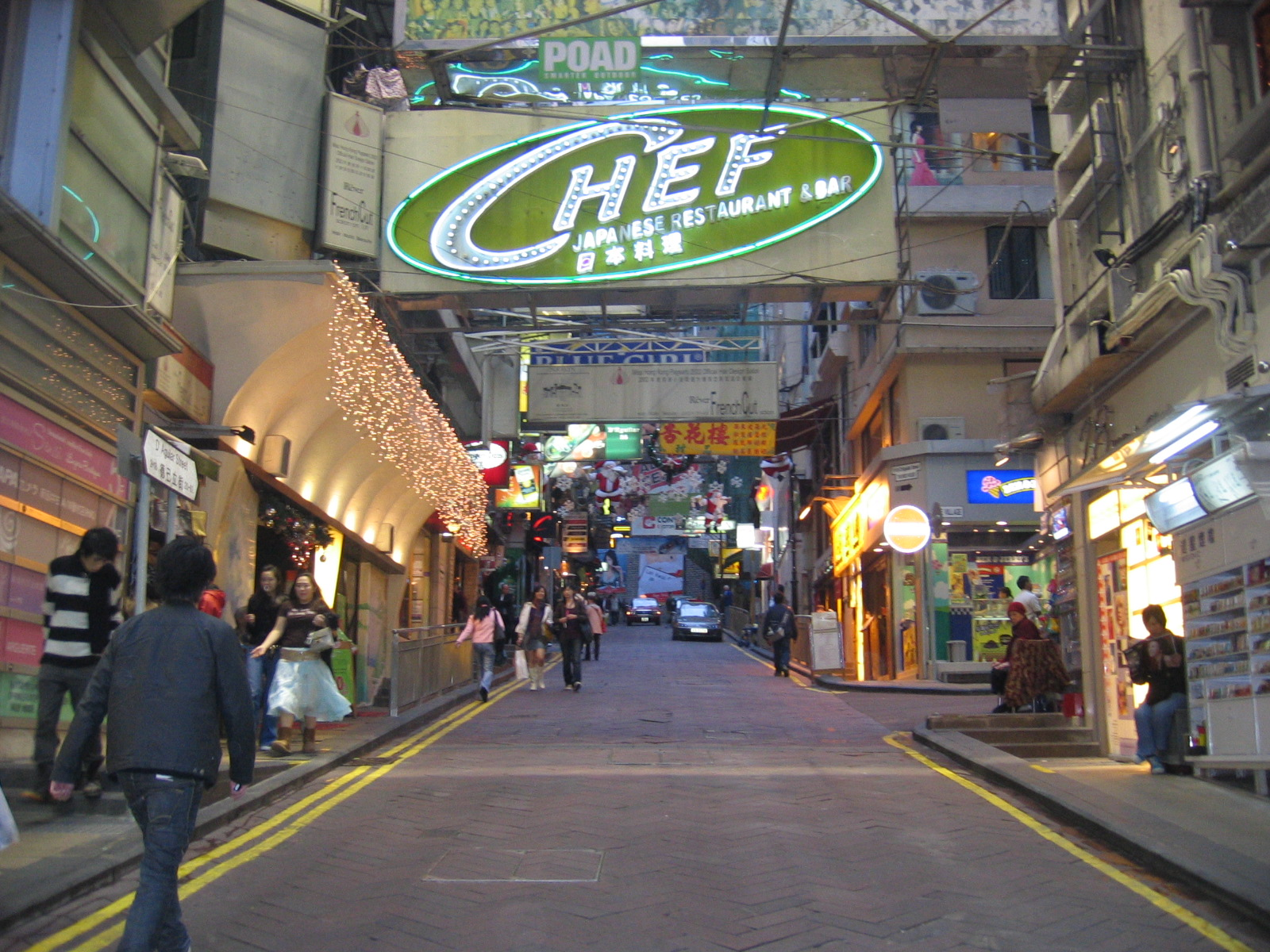
D'Aguilar Street, near its intersection with Wo On Lane and Lan Kwai Fong.

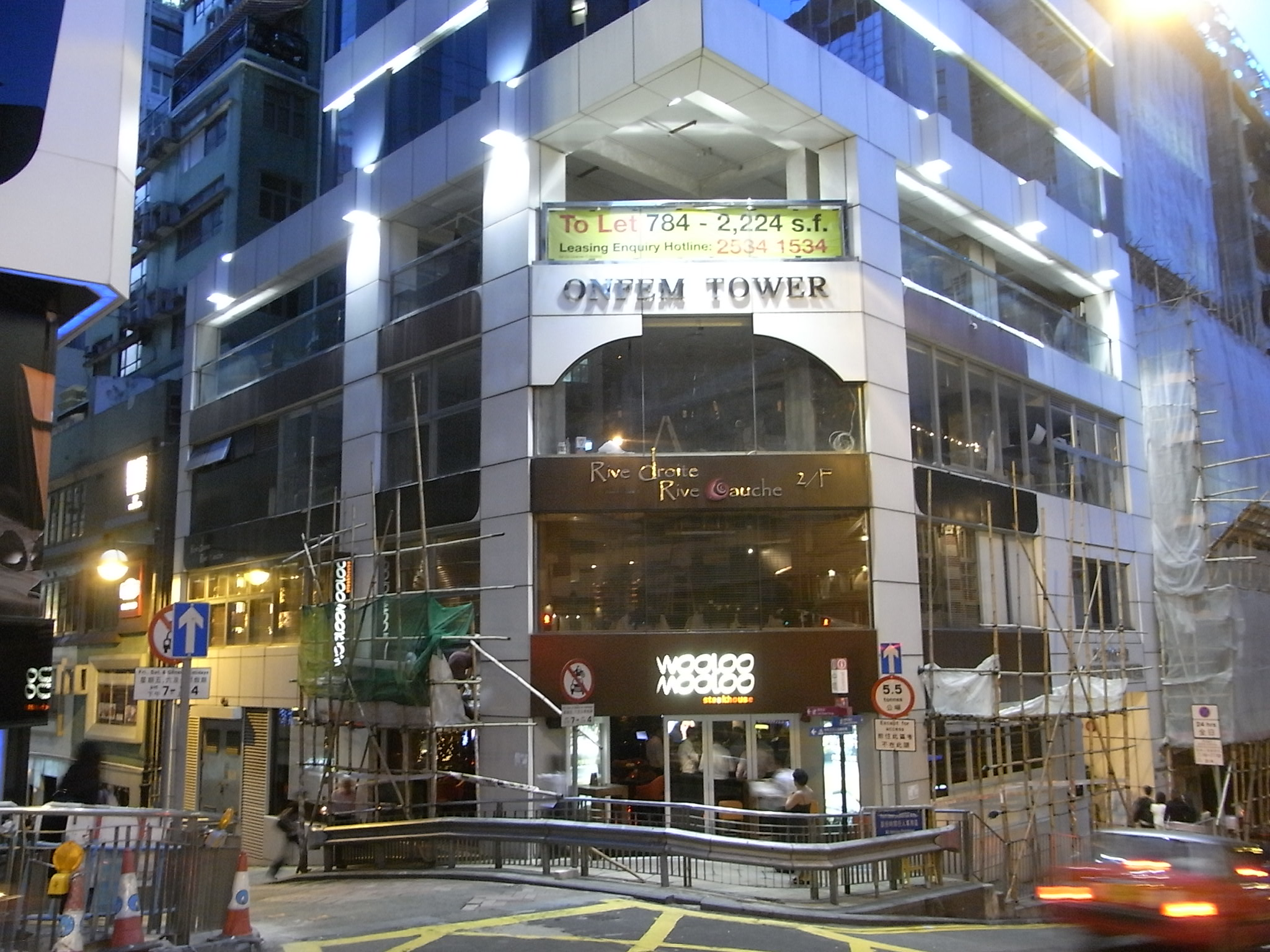
Upper end of D'Aguilar Street, at its intersection with Wyndham Street.

D'Aguilar Street (Chinese: 德己立街, formerly 德忌笠街 and 德記拉街) is a street in Central, Hong Kong.

It is named after George Charles d'Aguilar (1784–1855), Major General and Lieutenant Governor of Hong Kong from 1843 to 1848.

== Location ==
D'Aguilar Street is an L-shaped street starting from Queen's Road Central, west of Entertainment Building facing straight to Theatre Lane. It runs uphill and meets Stanley Street, Wellington Street, Wo On Lane and Lan Kwai Fong (twice). It turns after meeting Lan Kwai Fong and ends at the junction with Wyndham Street, Glenealy and Lower Albert Road near the Fringe Club.

== History ==
D'Aguilar Street was the location of the clinic of Filipino national hero José Rizal who lived in Hong Kong from the December 1891 to June 1892.

== Features ==
The higher section of D'Aguilar Street, together with Lan Kwai Fong, is a famous site for night life in Hong Kong. The area is collectively called Lan Kwai Fong, after the name of one of its streets. Foreign restaurants and bars can be found in the area.

== See also ==
- List of streets and roads in Hong Kong
