= Albert Road =

Albert Road may refer to:

- Albert Road Halt railway station, a disused station in Plymouth, England
- Lower Albert Road, a road where major government offices are located on Government Hill in Hong Kong
- Upper Albert Road, a road where the residence of the Chief Executive of Hong Kong is located on Government Hill in Hong Kong
- "Albert Road", a song by English Teacher from the album This Could Be Texas
