= Foreign Correspondents' Club (Hong Kong) =

Club for journalists and diplomats

Coordinates: 22°16′49.1″N 114°9′21.5″E

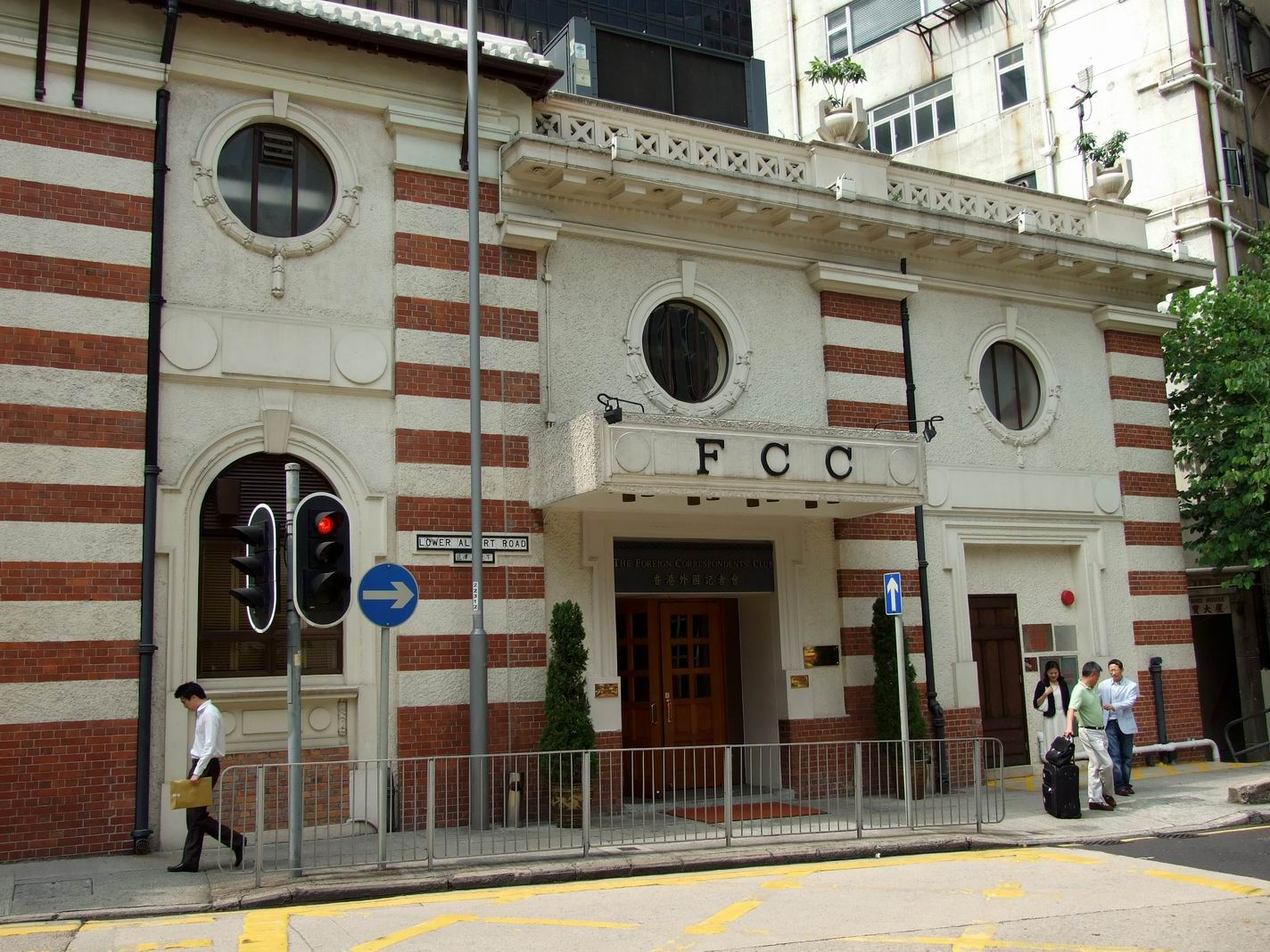
- Entrance of the Foreign Correspondents' Club on Lower Albert Road.
- Traditional Chinese: 香港外國記者會
- Simplified Chinese: 香港外国记者会
Transcriptions
Standard Mandarin
- Hanyu Pinyin: Xiānggǎng Wàiguó Jìzhě Huì
Yue: Cantonese
- Jyutping: hoeng1 gong2 ngoi6 gwok3 gei3 ze2 wui6*2

The Foreign Correspondents' Club (FCC) in Hong Kong is a members-only club and meeting place for the media, business and diplomatic community. It is located at 2 Lower Albert Road in Central, next to the Hong Kong Fringe Club, and they both occupy the Old Dairy Farm Depot at the top of Ice House Street, one of the few remaining colonial buildings in the Central district.

== History ==
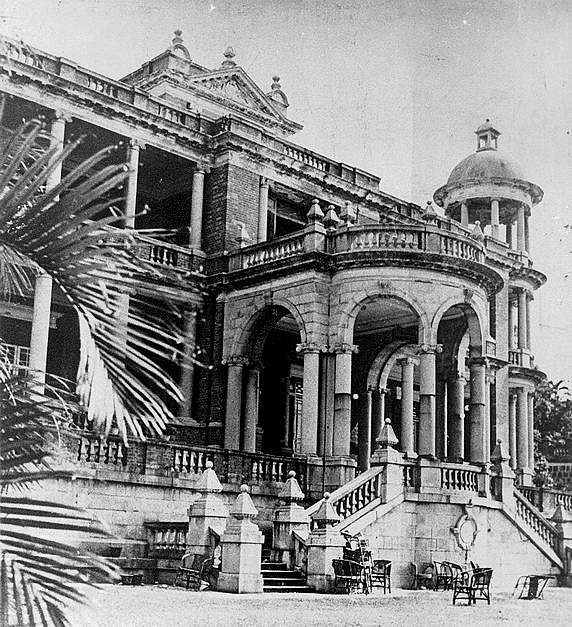
One of the buildings having historically housed the Foreign Correspondents' Club was located at 41A Conduit Road. It was portrayed as a hospital in the 1955 film Love Is a Many-Splendored Thing. The building was demolished in the late 1960s.

The club was founded in Chongqing in 1943 and moved to Hong Kong from Shanghai, where it was set up on 23 June or 25 June 1949. The club has been located in several buildings since its inception in Hong Kong. It has occupied the North Block of the Old Dairy Farm Depot since 1982. On 14 August 2018, the club hosted a lunch talk which pro-independence activist Andy Chan gave a speech. Beijing had tried to block the talk, but the club did not change the plan on ground of freedom of speech. As retaliation, Victor Mallet, the vice-president of FCC, was denied renewal of his visa.

In 2022, the government added a new national security clause to the club's lease "to safeguard national security and to sufficiently protect the Government's rights and interests."

== Membership ==
The FCC has the following membership categories:

- Correspondent
- Journalist
- Associate (in this category anyone can join although there is a waiting list which can vary from several months to several years)
- Corporate
- Diplomatic

The membership of the FCC (which totals around 2,400) includes foreign correspondents, reporters and members of the business and diplomatic community. The majority of members (around 1,600) are in the associate membership category. Previously it also included the Chief Executive of Hong Kong, but no chief executive since Donald Tsang has accepted an offer of membership.

When prominent international figures from the worlds of commerce, politics or entertainment visit Hong Kong, many choose to address the FCC's speaker lunches as the best means of reaching their desired audience – both directly and through media coverage of the events. Past speakers include the former chief executive Sir Donald Tsang, former chief secretary Mrs Anson Chan.

== Features ==
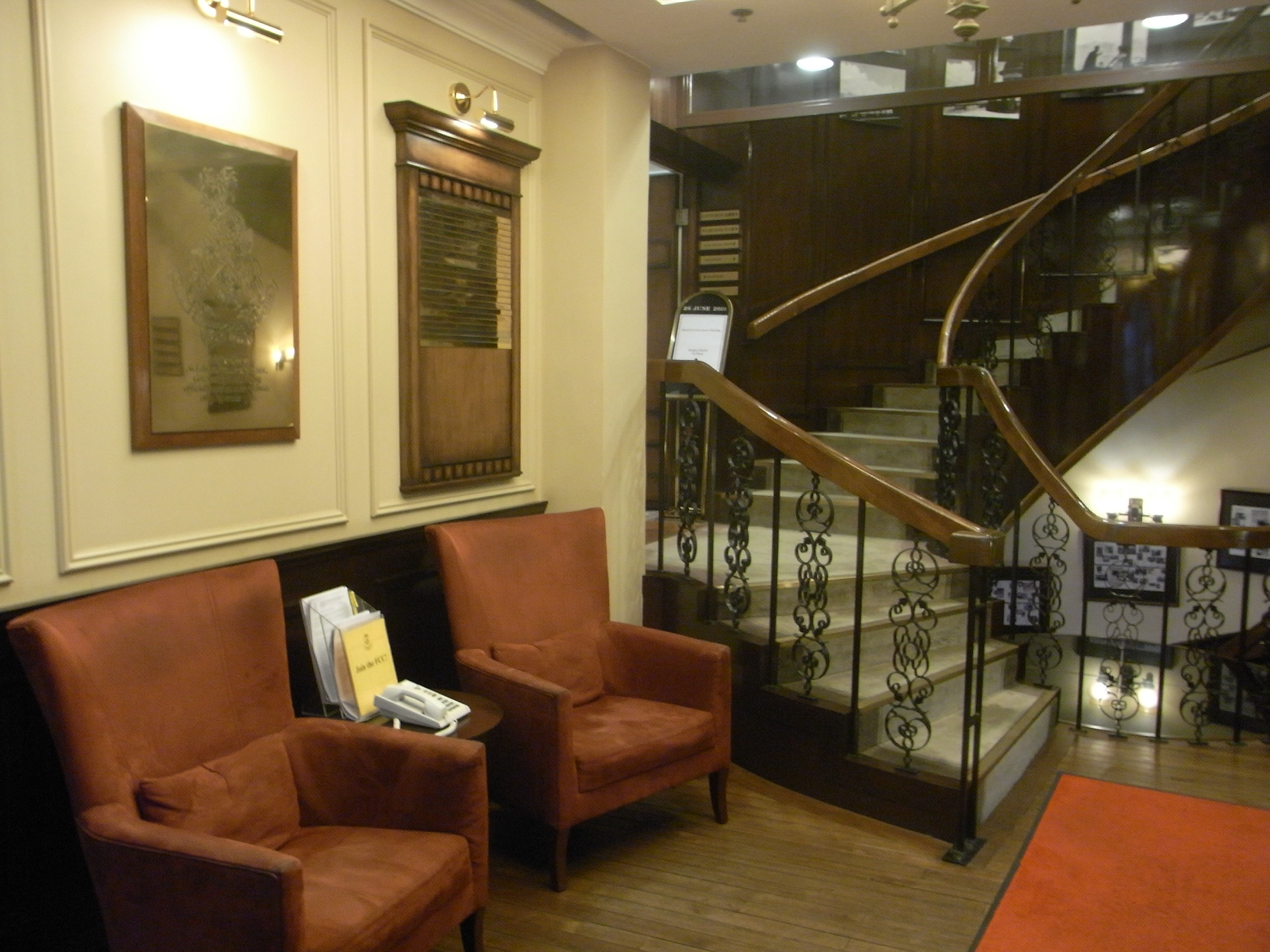
Foreign Correspondents' Club, Hong Kong.

The heart of the FCC building is The Main Bar (on the ground floor) which maintains its reputation for colourful characters both from the media and other professions. The FCC has two restaurants on the first floor: the Main Dining Room focused primarily on western-style cuisine, and the Chinese Restaurant.

In the basement is Bert's Bar, named after the late Bert Okuley, long time FCC member and jazz pianist. Bert's features live jazz several nights each week, often with the house band under the leadership of musical director Allen Youngblood.

The basement also contains The Work Room where local and visiting members can use the broadband-connected facilities to prepare their articles, and a small but well-equipped Health Club with fitness equipment, a sauna and a steam room.

== In popular culture ==
- The club is featured in John le Carré's 1977 novel The Honourable Schoolboy.
- The FCC has appeared several times in films:
  - Love Is a Many-Splendored Thing (1955), directed by Henry King. The FCC was located at Conduit Road at that time.
  - Chinese Box (1997), directed by Wayne Wang. Features the Main Bar.
  - Series 4, episode 1 of the British television series Cracker.

== See also ==
- United Services Recreation Club
