= Ice House Street =

Road in Hong Kong

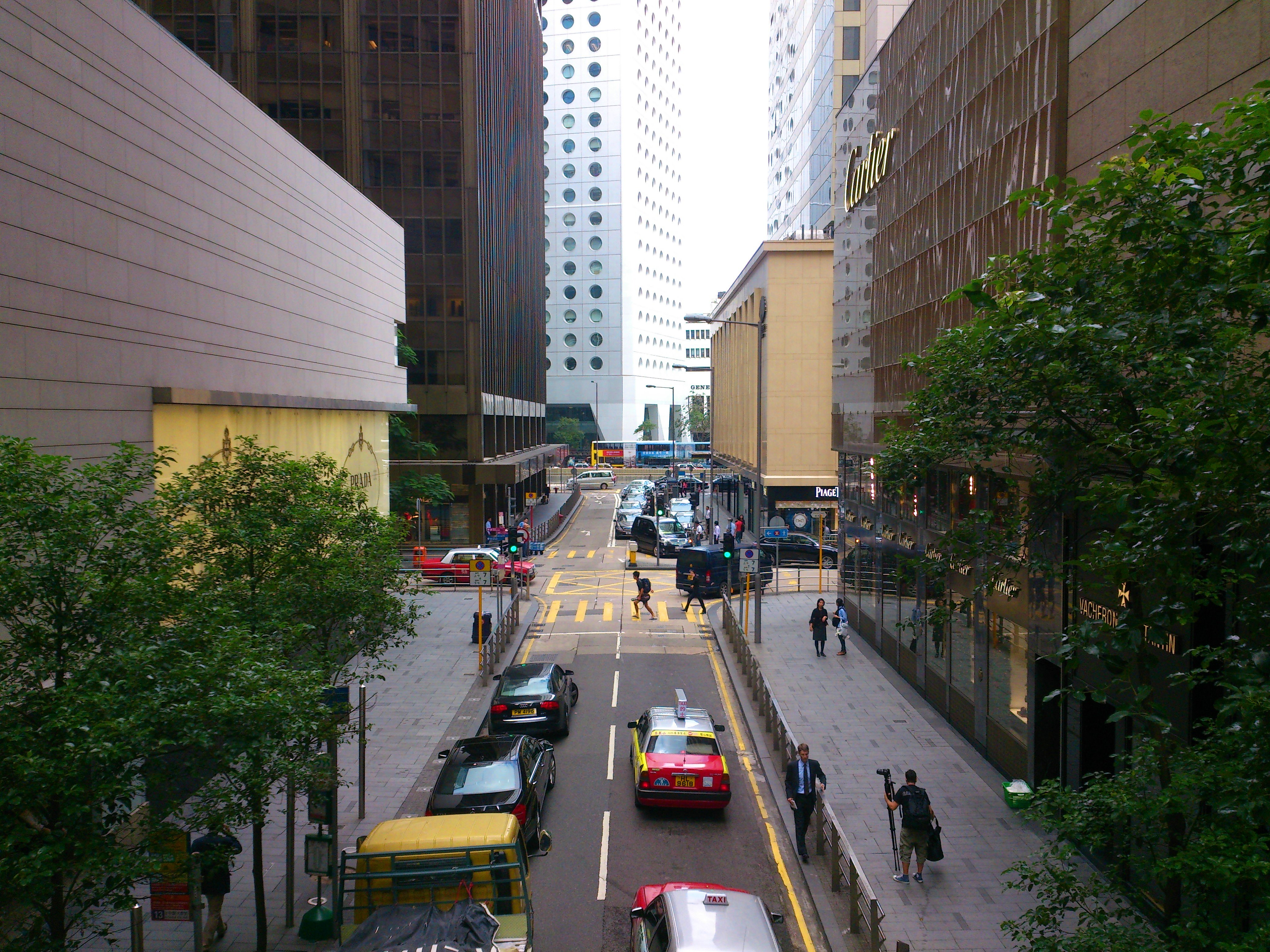
- The northern end of Ice House Street, near the junction with Chater Road. Connaught Road can be seen one block beyond Chater.
- Interactive map of Ice House Street
- Native name: 雪廠街 (Yue Chinese)
- Length: 550 m (1,800 ft)
- Location: Central, Hong Kong
- South end: Lower Albert Road
- North end: Connaught Road Central

Ice House Street
- Traditional Chinese: 雪廠街
- Simplified Chinese: 雪厂街
Transcriptions
Standard Mandarin
- Hanyu Pinyin: Xuěchǎng Jiē
Yue: Cantonese
- Jyutping: syut3 chong2 gaai1

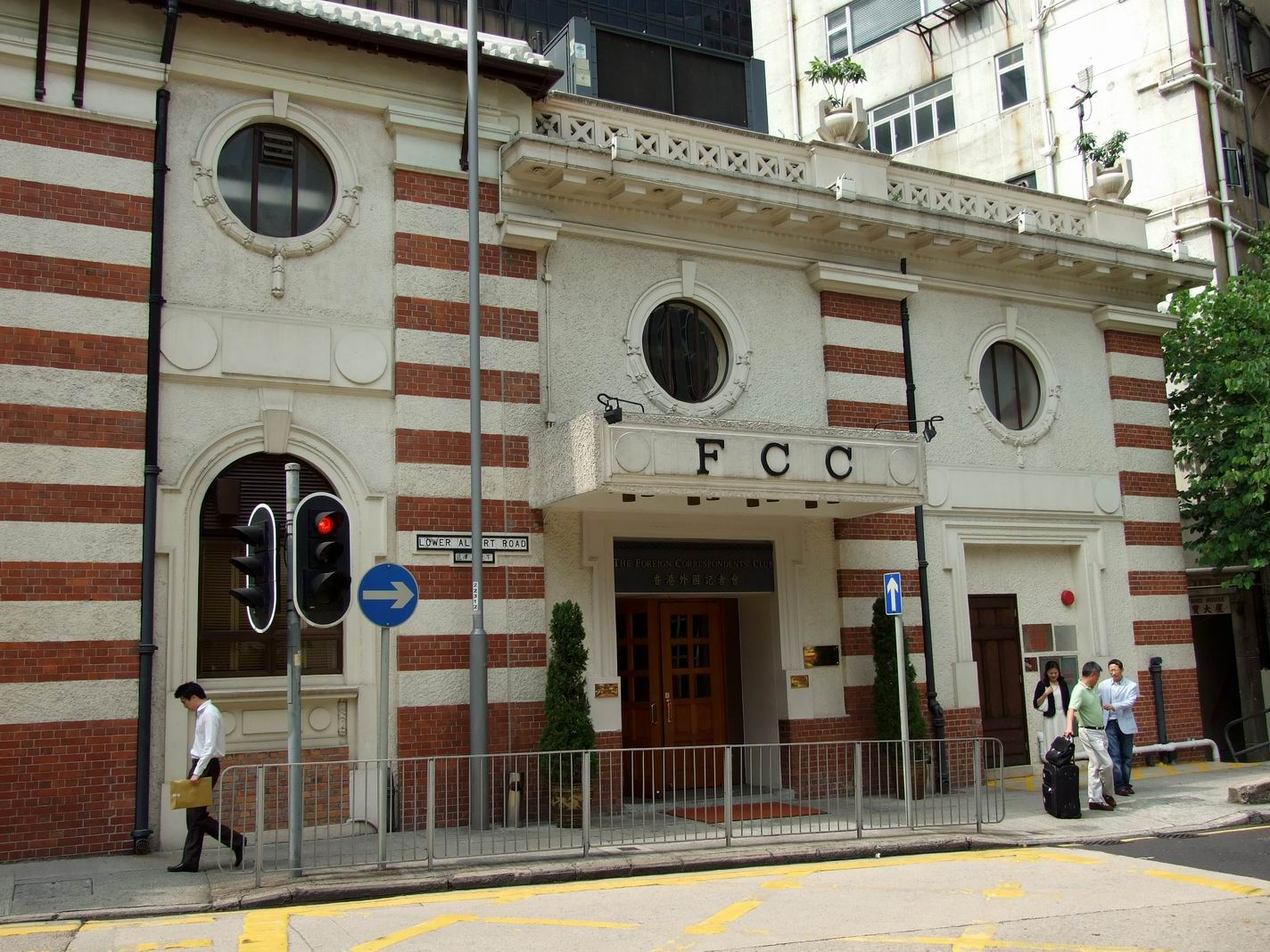
The Foreign Correspondents' Club, housed in the Old Dairy Farm Depot, is located at the southern end of Ice House Street

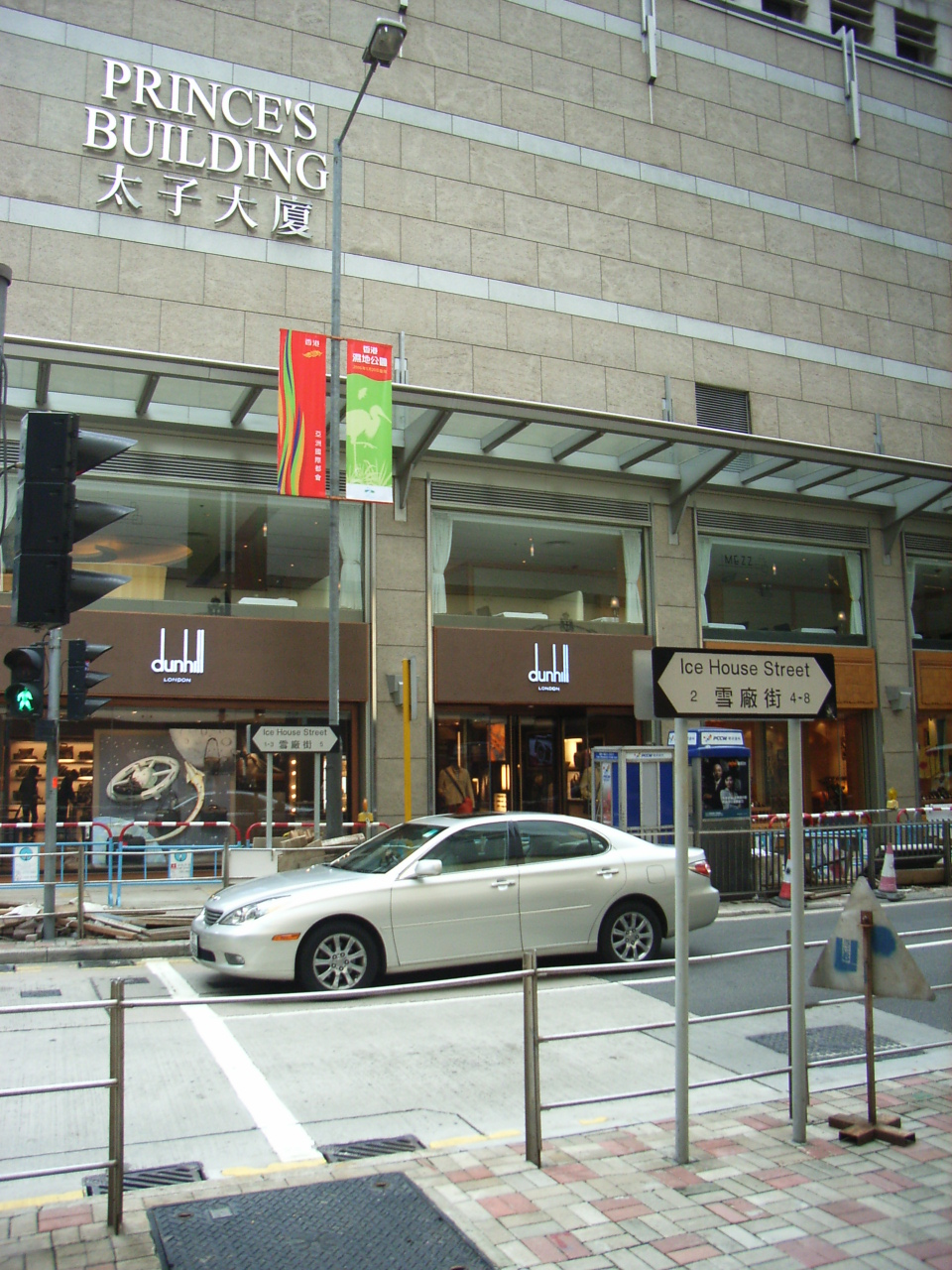
Ice House Street façade of Prince's Building.

Ice House Street (Chinese: 雪廠街; Jyutping: syut3 chong2 gaai1) is a one-way street in Central, Hong Kong Island. Named after the structure previously located on it that housed the city's only source of ice, it stretches from Lower Albert Road to Connaught Road. The street is noted for several historical landmarks situated on it – most notably the Club Lusitano and the Old Dairy Farm Depot.

== History ==
During the First Opium War, the British occupied Hong Kong in 1841; the following year, the territory was ceded to them in the Treaty of Nanking. Four years later, in 1845, the Hong Kong Ice Company was founded. It was set up with the intention of selling ice blocks from the United States—specifically from New England and New York State. These were transported to the colony on clippers, and traded as a commodity. To persuade the company to sell ice to local hospitals at cost price, the Government of Hong Kong granted the company the site for an ice house rent-free for 75 years. The building eventually lent its name to the street it was situated on; it was Hong Kong's only source of ice, as there weren't any commercial ice-making facilities in the colony. The building was located on the junction of Ice House Street with Queen's Road Central, and continued to store ice imports until 1874, when ice production commenced in Causeway Bay.

== Description and features ==
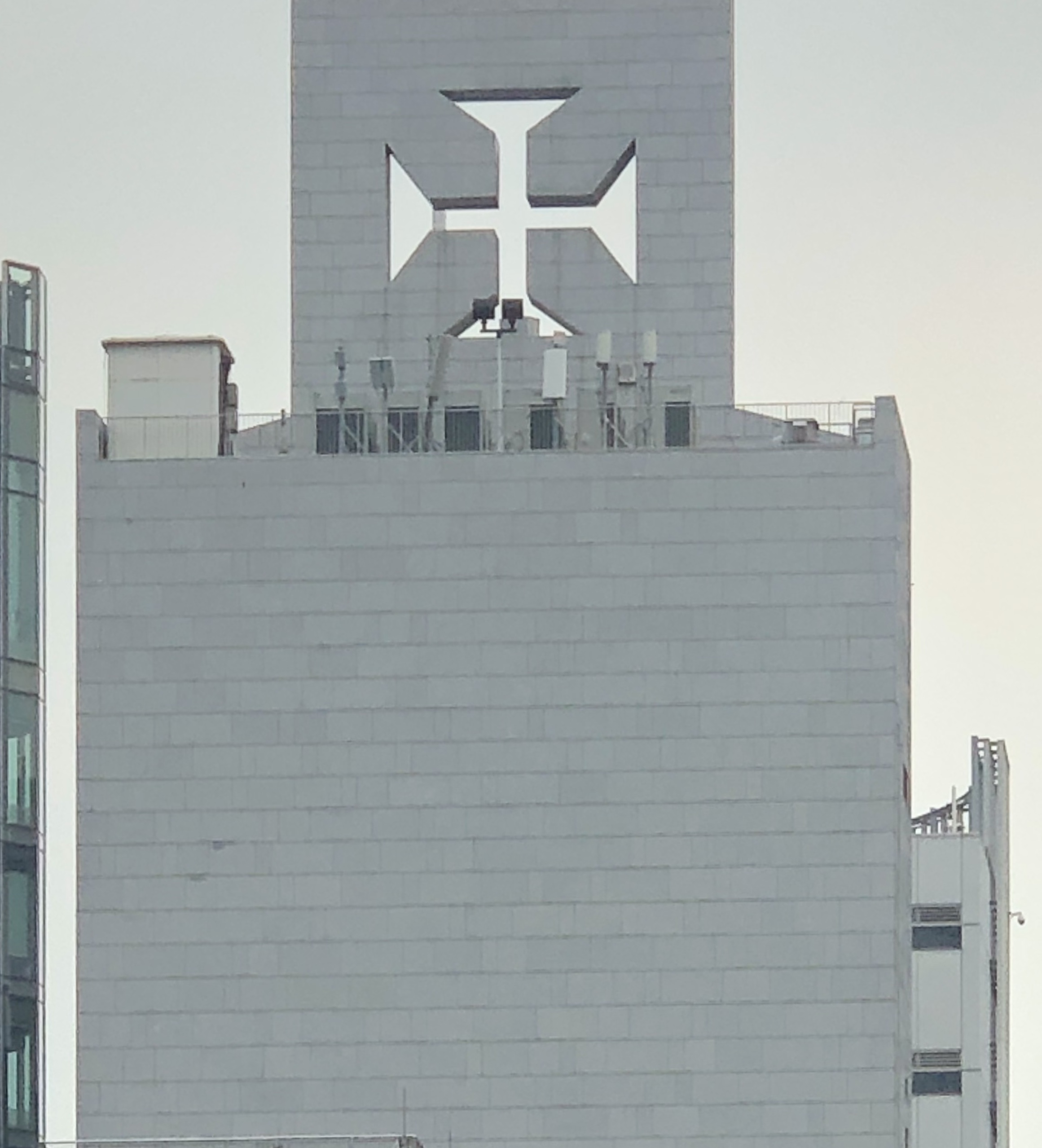
The Portuguese cross (Cruzeiro) atop Club Lusitano at 16 Ice House Street.

From its southern end, Ice House Street begins at the junction with Lower Albert Road. This is where the Old Dairy Farm Depot is located. Built by Dairy Farm, one of the first companies that sold ice cream and refrigerated milk in the city, it currently houses the Hong Kong Fringe Club and the Foreign Correspondents' Club. Although not officially on the street itself, the Bishop's House is situated across from the depot, and overlooks it from an elevated vantage point. It serves as the residence of the Archbishop of Hong Kong. The next landmark on Ice House Street is the flight of stairs which descends onto Duddell Street, and contains four gas lamps from the 1870s that are declared monuments and the only functioning gas lamps in Hong Kong. Before the street intersects with Queen's Road Central, it passes the Club Lusitano. The club, which is a meeting point for Portuguese expatriates in the city, has been located on the site since 1920 when it moved down from its original 1866 site on Shelley Street. The building has since been reconstructed twice: in 1967 and between 1996-2002

After crossing Queen's Road, Ice House Street goes past 9 Queen's Road Central. Although the current skyscraper is located on the site of a former building which stood there until 1987, the old complex's address was 9 Ice House Street. The street then intersects with Des Voeux Road Central and Chater Road before ending at the junction with Connaught Road Central.

== Other features ==
Other buildings located along the street include:

- Former Central Government Offices West Wing – 11 Ice House Street
- Alexandra House and Prince's Building, between Des Voeux Road Central and Chater Road
- Mandarin Oriental, between Chater Road and Connaught Road Central

== Major intersections ==
The entire route is in Central, Central and Western District.

km	mi	Destinations	Notes
0.00	0.00	Lower Albert Road	Southern terminus at one way street
0.27	0.17	Queen's Road Central	
0.40	0.25	Des Voeux Road	
0.55	0.34	Connaught Road to Route 4	Northern terminus at one way street
1.000 mi = 1.609 km; 1.000 km = 0.621 mi

== See also ==
- List of streets and roads in Hong Kong
