= HKCH =

HKCH may refer to:

- Hong Kong City Hall, a multi-purpose cultural complex in Central
- Hong Kong Central Hospital, a defunct private hospital in Central
- Hong Kong Children's Hospital, a government hospital in Kai Tak
