= William Pedder =

British navy lieutenant

William Pedder (21 June 1801 – 1854) was a lieutenant in the British Navy who was the fourth person appointed, under the first two Chief Superintendents, for the administration of the Government of Hong Kong and its second legal officer. He was Hong Kong's first Harbour Master and Marine Magistrate.

== Early life ==
Pedder was born on the Isle of Wight, probably the son of George Pedder, a surgeon, and his wife Mary Apsey. He entered the Royal Navy on 5 April 1814 and served in 1821 on HMS Iphigenia together with fellow Midshipman and later to be first Administrator of Hong Kong Charles Elliot. He was promoted to lieutenant on 11 June 1822 and commissioned on 21 June 1824.

Pedder married another Pedder, daughter of J Pedder, on 17 October 1825 in Swansea. By May 1838, they had sons William Henry and Frederick, and daughter Susan, and two more sons were to follow.

In October 1834, Pedder joined the Coastguard as a Chief Officer and continued in that service till 1839.

== China ==
Pedder was appointed First Officer of the secret British East India Company vessel Nemesis, a revolutionary iron steam-ship design, upon its completion in 1839, under Captain William Hutcheon Hall, another of his former fellow midshipmen on Iphigenia.

On 27 February 1841, Pedder was one of a landing party at Whampoa Reach and praised by his commander for his gallantry in his role in the capture of the Chinese forts on the Bocca Tigris.

He was appointed Harbour Master and Marine Magistrate of Hong Kong on 31 July 1841. He established Hong Kong's first police force, the Water Police, at some time between late 1841 and April 1842.

Pedder's duties as Harbour Master were to control movements of all vessels, including use of anchorages, to maintain good order and to issue notices of deadlines for accepting outgoing mail. He had full magisterial and police authority in respect of the imposition of the harbour control regulations. His supporting staff initially consisted of Assistant Harbour Master and Officiating Marine Magistrate, together with their clerks, Indian interpreters, boatmen and coolies. His office was a room in his house, then situated on a hill by the harbour, next to the road bearing his name. A separate building a short distance to the east of his home was adopted for the formal Harbour Master's Office in 1845, on the site of today's Bank of China Building, Bank Street.

Pedder was a committee member of the Society for the Relief of Destitute Sick Foreigners, formed in 1846.

Suffering ill health, Pedder took leave of absence from his duties in November 1853 and returned to England. He died on 16 March 1854 at Ryde, Isle of Wight, and probate of his will was granted the same year.

== Legacy ==
One of Hong Kong's first streets to be laid out was named in his honour as was one of its earliest piers. The area above modern-day Central on Ice House and Wyndham Streets was known as Pedder's Hill at least until the last years of the 19th century.
