= Benny Chia =

Founder of Hong Kong Fringe Club, curator, writer

Benny Chia (simplified Chinese: 谢俊兴; traditional Chinese: 謝俊興; pinyin: Xiè Jùn Xing) is an author, festival director, curator, and an active member in the Hong Kong arts scene. He founded the Hong Kong Fringe Club in 1984, modelled after the Adelaide Festival Fringe, and turned a disused ice depot on Lower Albert Road in Central Hong Kong into a vibrant arts venue: the Fringe Club. The history of Fringe Club is covered in Benny Chia's memoir Life on the Fringe – The Almost Naked Memoir, published by Hong Kong University Press and MCCM Creations in November 2024.

== Career ==
Raised in a single-parent and deprived family, Chia turned his life around through his innate love for arts and education, and became the first non-British in charge of a fly-by-night arts outfit during the days of colonial Hong Kong in the 1980s. Born in Singapore and educated in Hong Kong, Paris and Louvain, Benny Chia 謝俊興 launched the Hong Kong Fringe Festival in 1983, founded the Fringe Club in 1984 and steered the Fringe Club as General Manager and Artistic Director through to 2022 – almost forty years. He created artistic concepts and wrote scripts for the theatre, and wrote articles for the South China Morning Post and other publications. Chia is a founding member of Hong Kong Arts Development Council, Hong Kong International Film Festival, and the Hong Kong Arts Administrators Association. Honours awarded include the Bronze Bauhinia Star from the HKSAR Government, the Badge of Honour from the former Hong Kong Government, Best Arts Promoter from the Hong Kong Artists Guild, and Hero of Hong Kong from Time Out Magazine.

Chia curated multiple arts exhibitions, notably, frogtopia – hongkornucopia, as part of the Venice Art Biennale 2011, featuring Hong Kong artist Frog King; Ac.cul.tur.at.ion; Shirt Art; Dare to Dream; Almost Blue; and others.

== Playwright and stage production ==
Title	Year	Producers	Venue	Country	Director and Main Cast
Hong Kong Fable	1986	Hong Kong Fringe Club	Fringe Theatre, Dom Pedro theatre, Macau	Hong Kong, Macau	Producer: Benny Chia Director: Desmond Jones Mime artists: Philip Fok & Cheng Pok Yee
Six Chapters of a Floating Life	1987	Hong Kong Fringe Club	Premiered in 'A Celebration of Hong Kong Artist, City Hall Silver Jubilee' on 19 October 1987	Toured in Forum, Macau; Price Theatre, Adelaide; National Theatre, Taipei; Carnivale, Sydney	Director & Choreographer: Kaitai Chan, Concept and Script: Benny Chia Cast: Lindzay Chan; Philip Fok
Lament of Sim Kim	1991	Hong Kong Fringe Club	Chinese Theatrical Arts Festival 1991, City Hall Theatre	Hong Kong	Director & choreographer: Kaitai Chan Concept & Script: Benny Chia
Great Expectations	1992	Hong Kong Fringe Club & Sydney Theatre Company co-production	Festival of Asian Arts Opening Programme, Hong Kong Cultural Centre, Grand Theatre	Hong Kong	Director: Rodney Fisher Concept: Kaitai Chan Scriptwriter: Benny Chia Design: Ho Ying Fung
Lianne & Chuck	1996	Hong Kong Fringe Club	Hong Kong Fringe Club	Hong Kong	Directed & choreographed by Kai Tai Chan Concept: Kaitai Chan Script: Benny Chia Collages: Christopher Doyle
Play the Old City Once Upon the Time in Wong Uk Hong Kong at War - a city of love and betrayal	1999-2002	Hong Kong Fringe Club	Site-specific performances at Wong Uk, Shatin, Hong Kong; Coastal Defence Museum	Hong Kong	Concept: Benny Chia Script: Lung Man Hong Director: Tang Shu Wing Heritage consultant: Professor Shiu Kwok Kin
Ho Chi Ming in Hong Kong	2006	Hong Kong Fringe Club	CPS Central Police Compound & the Fringe Club	Hong Kong	Producer: Benny Chia Director: Peter Jordon Concept & Script by Peter Wesley-Smith Dramaturg: William Gluth Cast: Lee Chun Chow
體驗劇場：她和他的時間之流	2017	Hong Kong Fringe Club	Hong Kong Fringe Club	Hong Kong	Producer: Benny Chia Scriptwriter: Pat To Yang Director: Indy Lee
意識之流 Stream of Consciousness	2018	Hong Kong Fringe Club	Hong Kong Fringe Club	Hong Kong	Producer: Benny Chia Director: Yan Pat To

== Retirement and authorship ==
Benny Chia retired from the Fringe Club in 2022 and started his career as an author with his first book Life on the Fringe – The Almost Naked Memoir, published in 2024 by Hong Kong University Press and MCCM Creations.
