= Old Dairy Farm Depot =

Building in Central, Hong Kong

Coordinates: 22.2802°N 114.156°E

- 舊牛奶公司倉庫
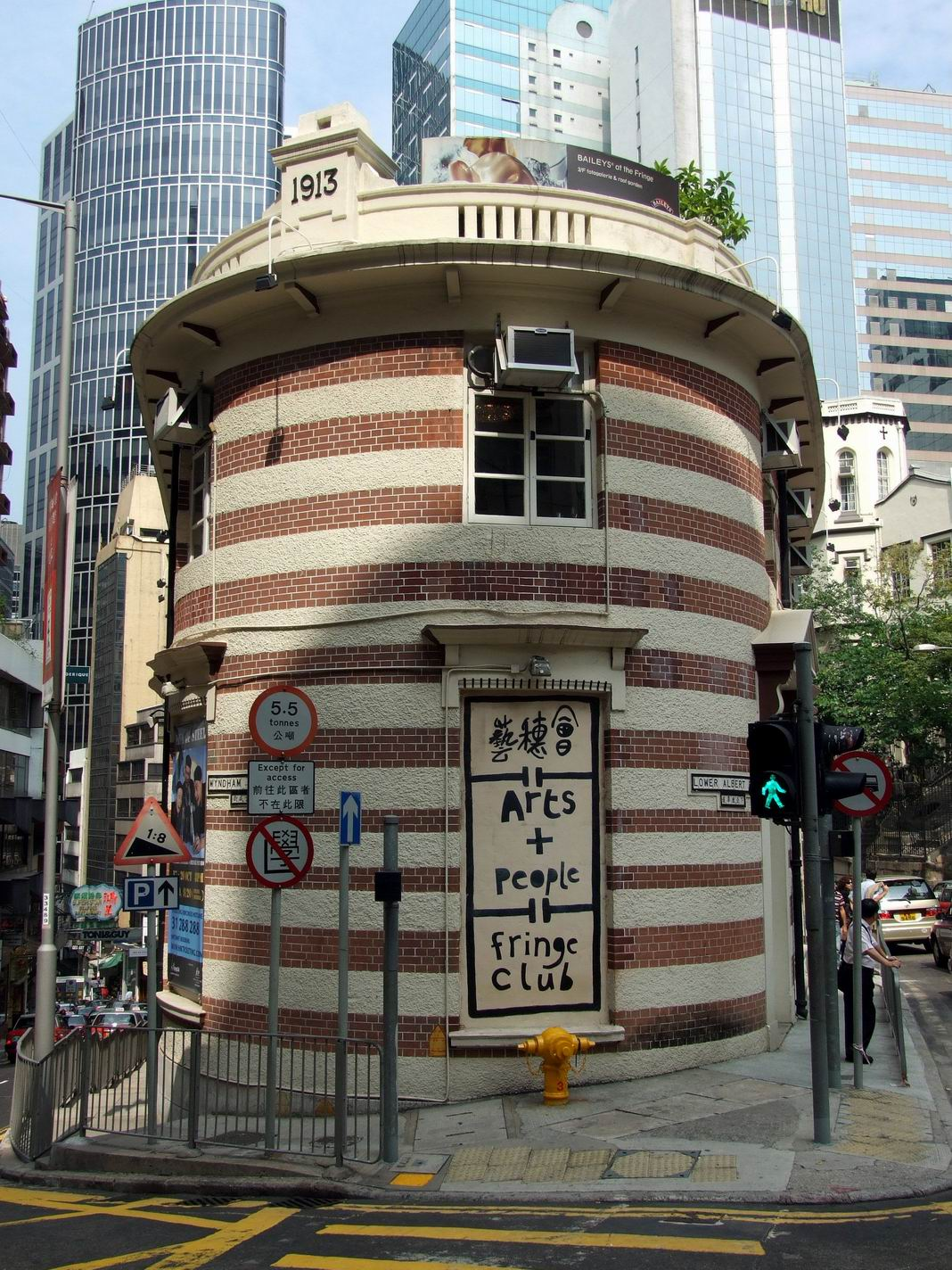
- A view of the curved, striped end of the South Block from Glenealy
- Interactive map of the Old Dairy Farm Depot area

General information
- Status: Leased – arts venue & clubhouse
- Architectural style: Late Victorian eclectic
- Classification: Grade I declared monument
- Location: Hong Kong, 2 Lower Albert Road, Central
- Current tenants: North Foreign Correspondents' Club; South Fringe Club
- Construction started: 1890
- Renovated: 1913
- Landlord: Government Property Agency

Design and construction
- Architecture firm: Danby & Leigh
- Main contractor: Dairy Farm

Renovating team
- Awards and prizes: Antiquities & Monuments Office's Award of Merit

Old Dairy Farm Depot
- Traditional Chinese: 舊牛奶公司倉庫
- Simplified Chinese: 旧牛奶公司仓库
Transcriptions
Standard Mandarin
- Hanyu Pinyin: Jiù Niúnǎi Gōngsī Cāngkù
Yue: Cantonese
- Yale Romanization: Gauh ngàuh náaih gūng sī chōng fu
- Jyutping: Gau6 ngau4 naai5 gung1 si1 cong1 fu3

Old Dairy Farm Building
- Traditional Chinese: 舊牛奶公司寫字樓
- Simplified Chinese: 旧牛奶公司写字楼
Transcriptions
Standard Mandarin
- Hanyu Pinyin: Jiù Niúnǎi Gōngsī xiězìlóu
Yue: Cantonese
- Yale Romanization: Gauh ngàuh náaih gūng sī sé jih làuh
- Jyutping: Gau6 ngau4 naai5 gung1 si1 se2 zi6 lau4

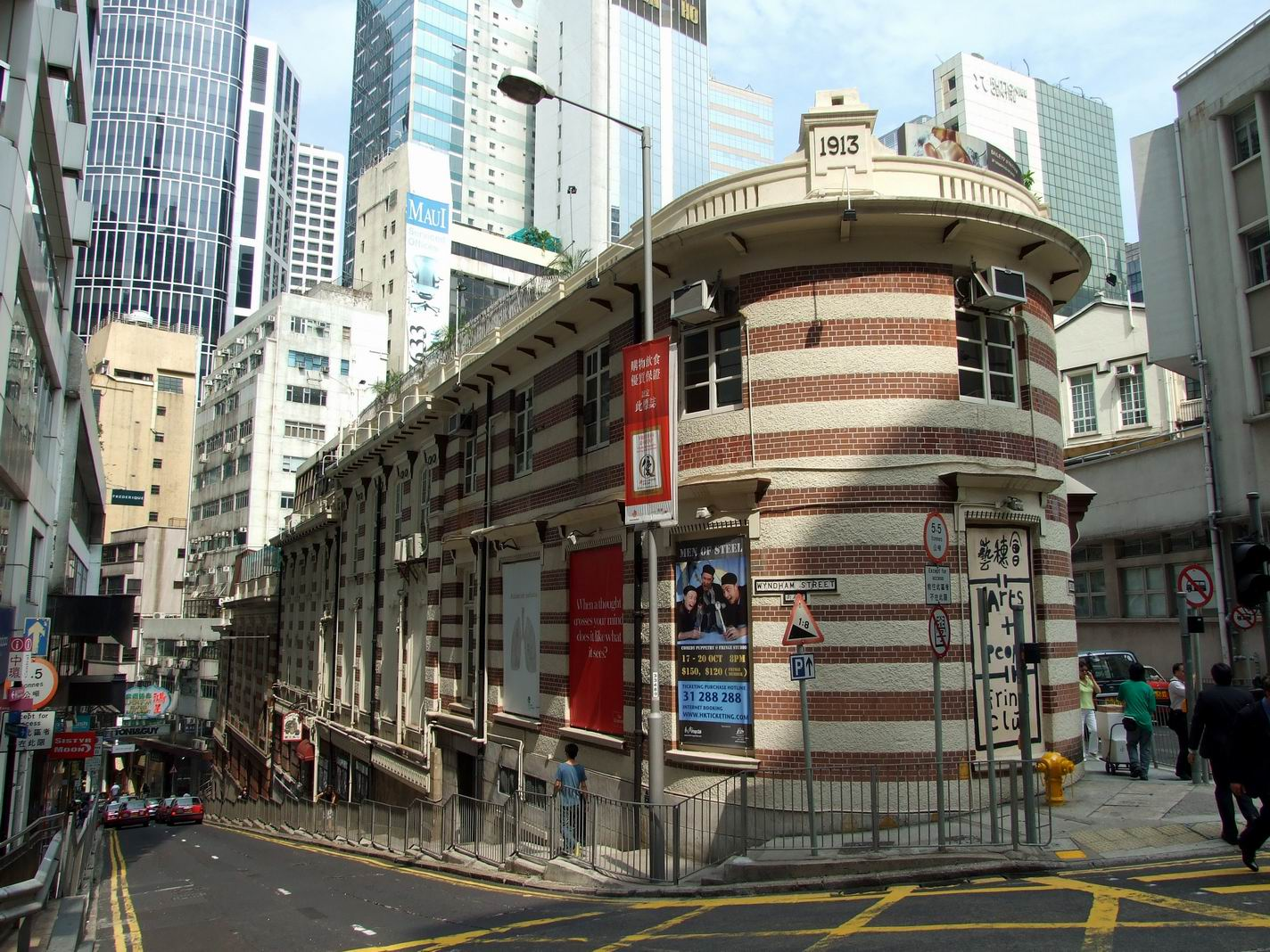
The Old Dairy Farm Depot along Wyndham Street. Lower Albert Road is on the right.

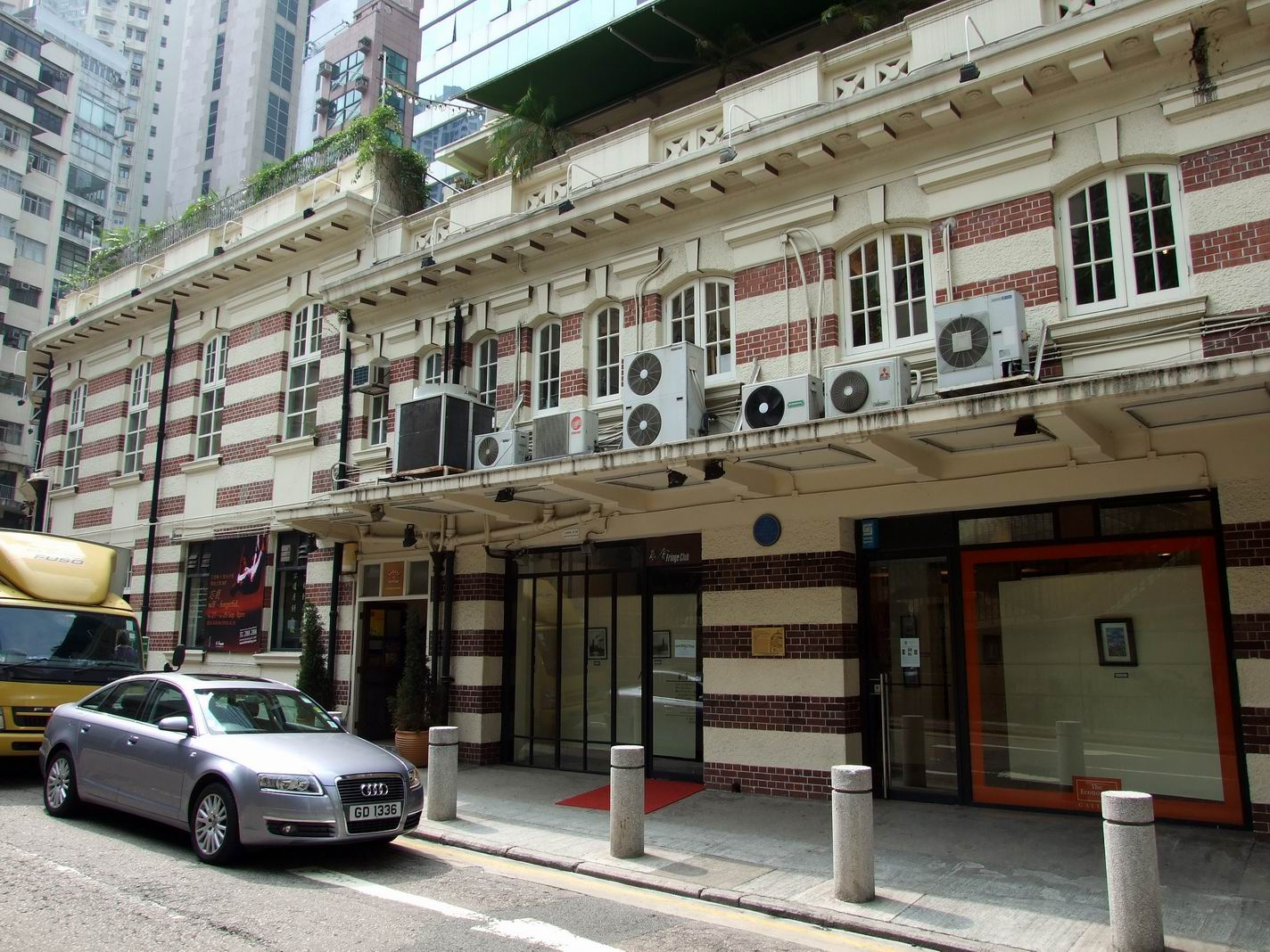
Entrance of the Hong Kong Fringe Club, Lower Albert Road.

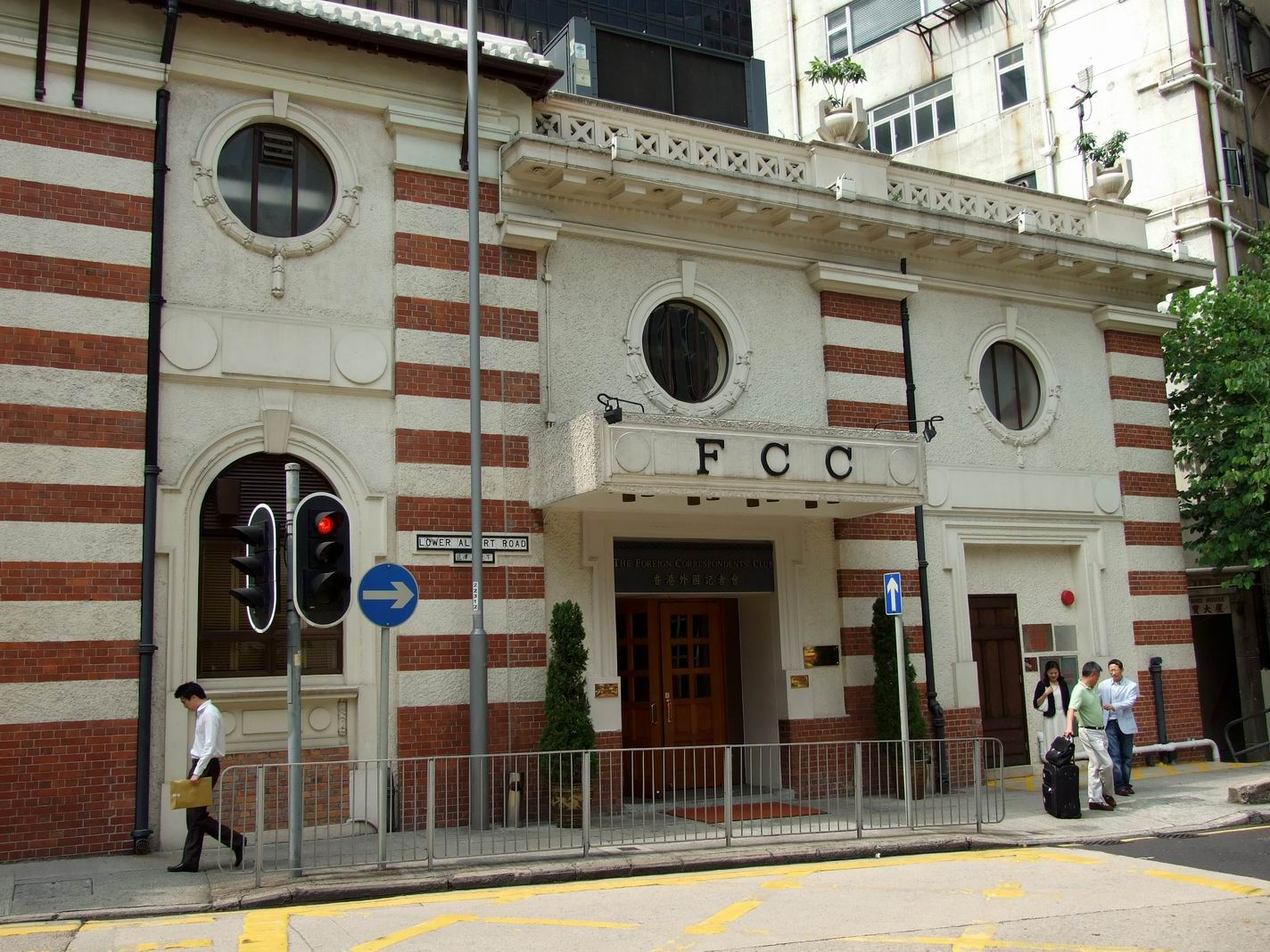
The Foreign Correspondents' Club.

The Old Dairy Farm Depot, or Old Dairy Farm Building, is a building in Central, Hong Kong, which currently houses the Hong Kong Fringe Club (South Block) and the Foreign Correspondents' Club (North Block). It is located at 2 Lower Albert Road. The back of the building is located along Wyndham Street, while its edge faces Glenealy.

== History ==
In 1892, Dairy Farm built a low-rise brick and a stucco building on Lower Albert Road in Central for use as a cold storage warehouse. It was designed by Danby & Leigh (now Leigh & Orange). The original depot only comprised about half (the southern part) of the present premises. This warehouse was later renovated and expanded in 1913, 1917 and 1925 to include a dairy shop, a room for meat smoking, a cold storage room for winter clothes and residency for the general manager. The building later evolved into the company headquarters until the company moved in the 1970s.

The Foreign Correspondents' Club started occupying the North Block in 1982. The South Block has been leased by the Hong Kong Fringe Club since 1984. It has undergone many major renovations since the Fringe Club moved in.

== Architecture ==
The building is built in the Eclectic architectural style with strong Neoclassical and some Arts and Crafts influence. The facade features polychromatic "bandaged" brickworks.

== Conservation ==
The building is located along the Central and Western Heritage Trail. It was listed as a Grade II historic building in 1981, and as a Grade I historic building in 2009. The project of renovation and refurbishment of the Old Dairy Farm Building and its conversion into the Hong Kong Fringe Club was a winner of the 2001 Hong Kong Heritage Awards, organised by the Antiquities Advisory Board and the Antiquities and Monuments Office.
