= Upper Albert Road =

Road in Hong Kong

Coordinates: 22°16′45″N 114°09′19″E

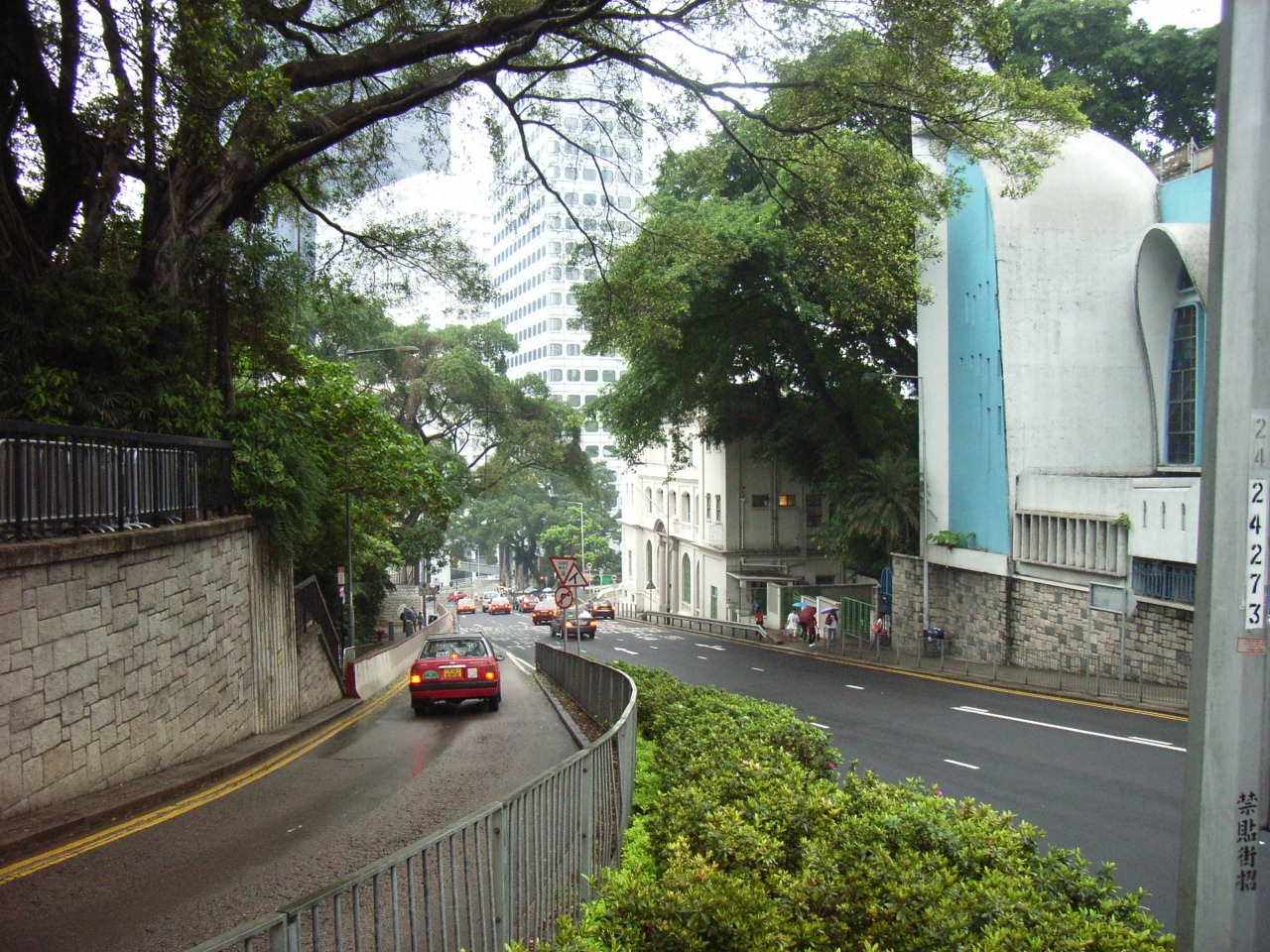
- Upper Albert Road on the left and Garden Road right
- Traditional Chinese: 上亞厘畢道
Transcriptions
Yue: Cantonese
- Jyutping: seung6 nga3 lei4 bat1 dou6

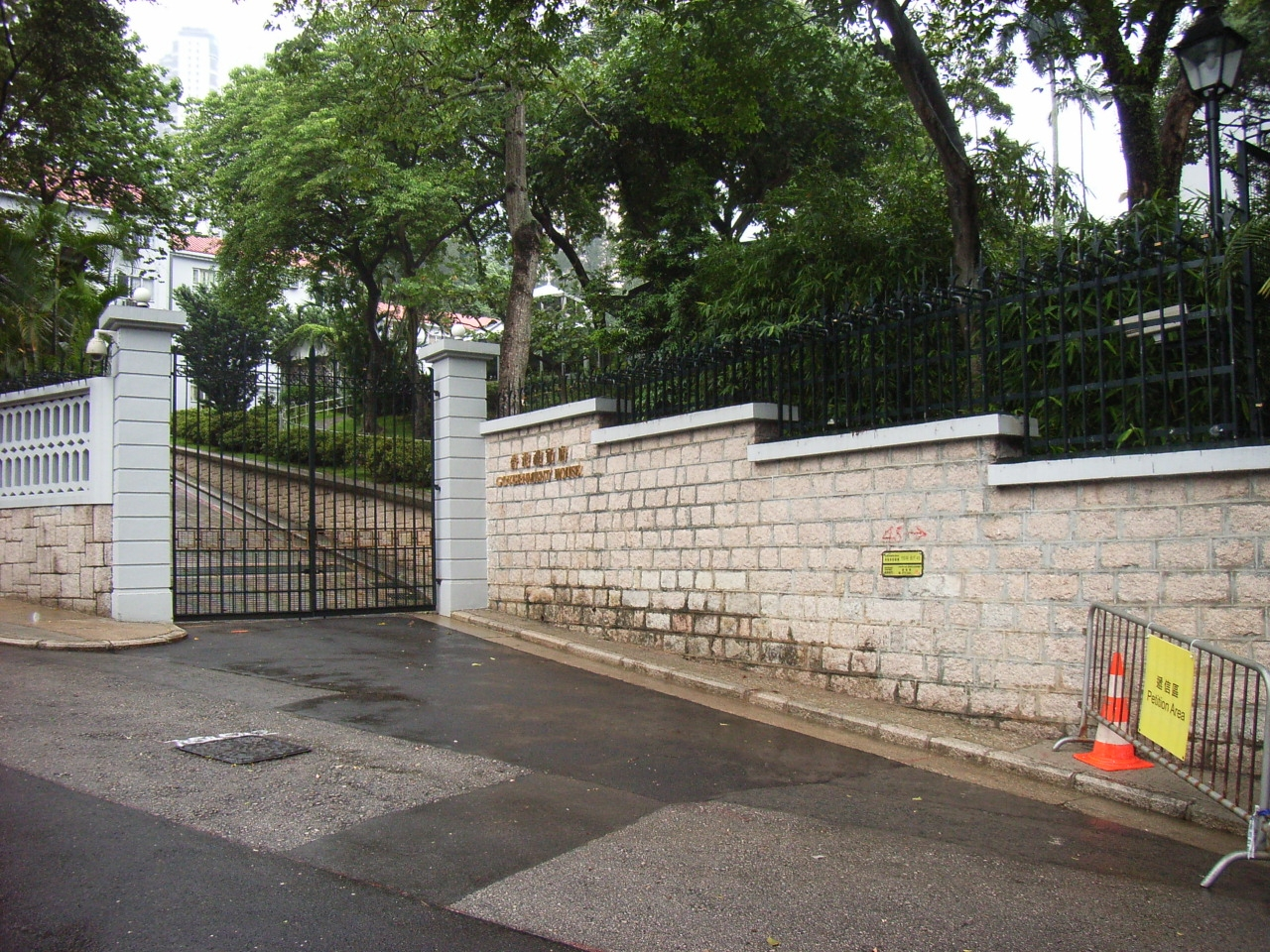
The backdoor of Government House, the destination of protests

Upper Albert Road is a road on Government Hill in the Central area of Hong Kong.

The road was named after Prince Albert of Saxe-Coburg and Gotha, the consort of Queen Victoria.

Surrounding Government House, the residence of former governors of Hong Kong and the present chief executive of Hong Kong, the road is used as a destination for various protests which sometimes results in traffic congestion, and as such Upper Albert Road is used as a synonym of the Chief Executive's Office.

The road is irregularly U-shaped and almost encircles Government House. Starting from Lower Albert Road, the road winds up the hills and turns near the Consulate General of United States of America building. It intersects with Garden Road, Kennedy Road and Cotton Tree Drive.

On the upper part of the road, its north side is covered by the Hong Kong Zoological and Botanical Gardens and ends in the junction with Caine Road, Glenealy and Arbuthnot Road near the headquarters of Caritas Hong Kong.

As it forms part of the early development of the city of Victoria, some old curtain fig trees stand beside the road.

== See also ==
- List of streets and roads in Hong Kong
