= Hong Kong Central Hospital =

- The Hong Kong Central Hospital Ltd.
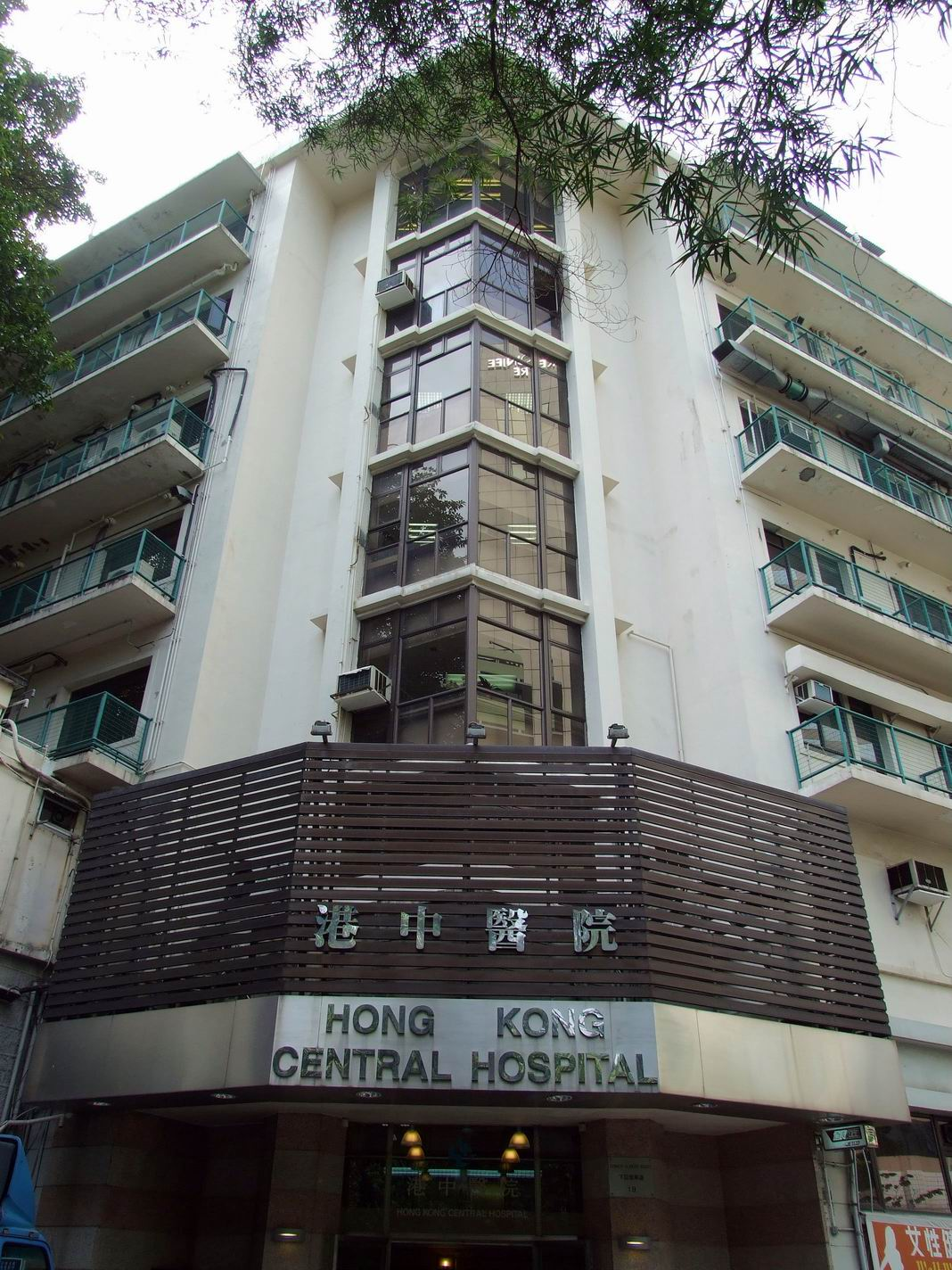
- Hong Kong Central Hospital main entrance in 2007

- Location within Hong Kong

Geography
- Location: 1B Lower Albert Road, Central, Hong Kong
- Coordinates: 22°16′47″N 114°09′23″E

Organisation
- Care system: Private
- Type: General

Services
- Emergency department: No Accident & Emergency
- Beds: 85

History
- Founded: 1966
- Closed: 2012

Links
- Website: https://www.hkch.org at the Wayback Machine (archived July 22, 2011)
- Lists: Hospitals in Hong Kong

Hong Kong Central Hospital (Chinese: 港中醫院) was a non-profit, general private hospital located in the Central area of Hong Kong Island, Hong Kong.

== Services ==
The hospital's services include a large number of specialties which cover a broad area of medicine. At its height, the hospital carried out 60% of Hong Kong's abortions.

HKCH is a member of the Hong Kong Private Hospitals Association. It was surveyed bi-annually by the Trent Accreditation Scheme, a UK-based major international healthcare accreditation scheme, but is currently not accredited by any independent accreditation scheme.

== Closure ==
The hospital closed on 1 September 2012, following a dispute that stretched back to 2009, and is the first private hospital in the city to close its doors. Plans for the site's reconstruction, which includes building a 25-storey non-profit hospital, were submitted in January 2017.

== See also ==
- List of hospitals in Hong Kong
