= Glenealy, Hong Kong =

Street in Central, Hong Kong

Coordinates: 22°16′42.72″N 114°9′11.58″E

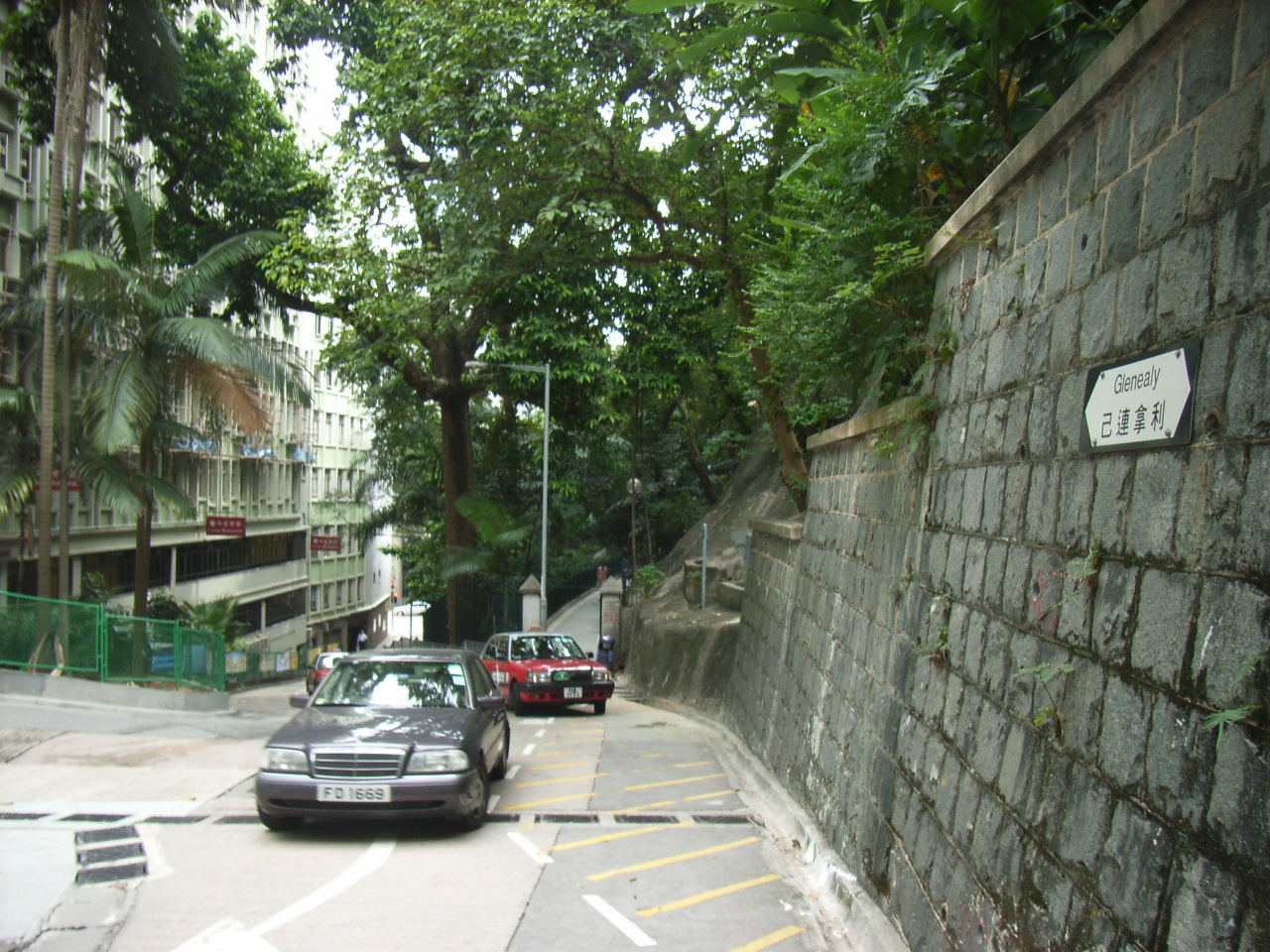
- Glenealy, looking north from the pedestrian footpath by the roundabout next to Caritas House
- Traditional Chinese: 己連拿利
- Simplified Chinese: 己连拿利
Transcriptions
Standard Mandarin
- Hanyu Pinyin: Jǐliánnálì
Yue: Cantonese
- Yale Romanization: Géi lìhn nàh leih
- Jyutping: Gei2 lin4 na4 lei6

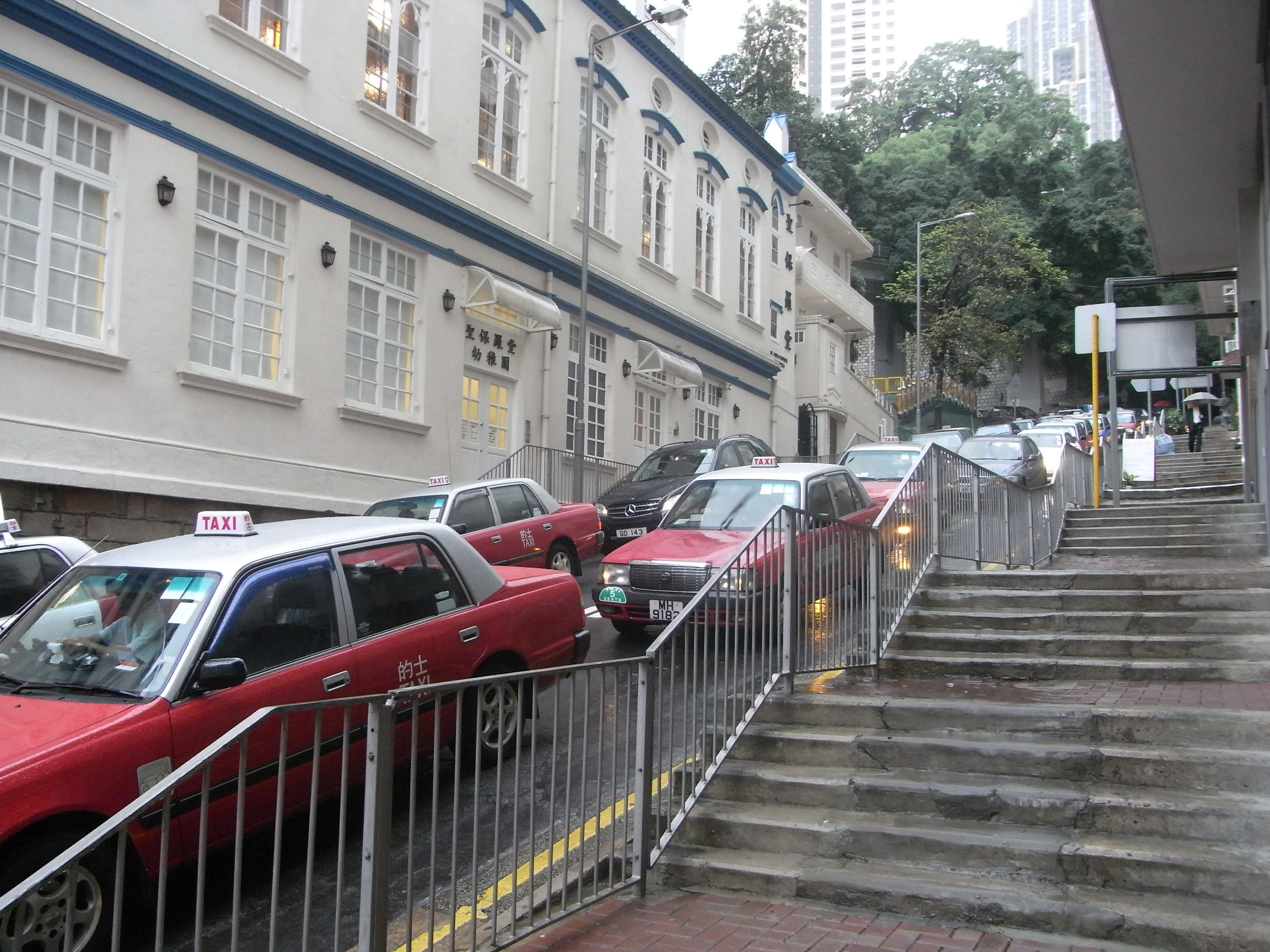
Section near Wyndham Street, Central, Hong Kong

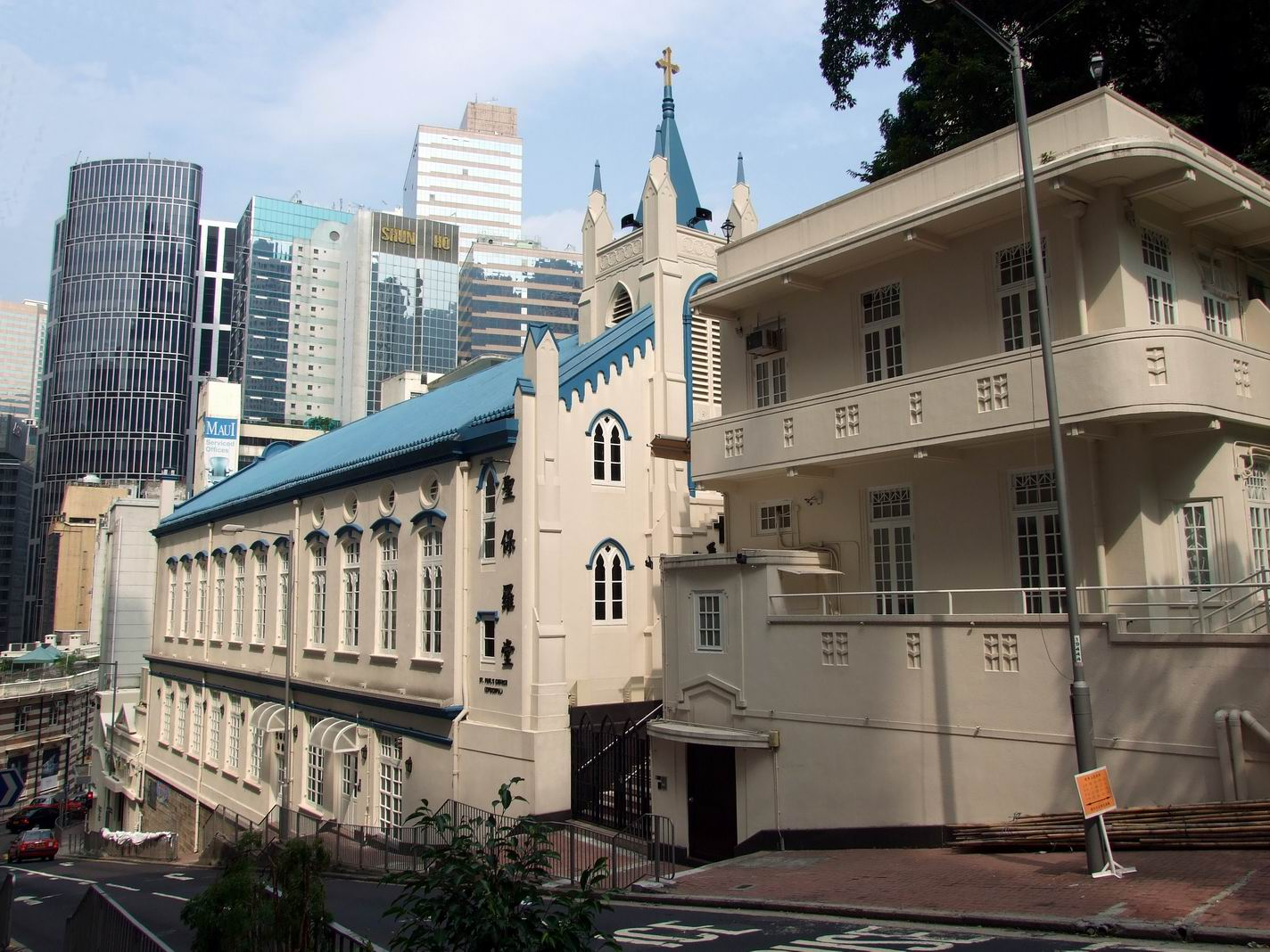
The Anglican Sheng Kung Hui St Paul's Church along Glenealy

Sign warning motorists of the steep gradient

Glenealy (Chinese: 己連拿利; formerly 忌連拿利) is one of the few thoroughfares in Hong Kong without a street type suffix. Located in the Mid-Levels on Hong Kong Island, it starts at the junction of Wyndham Street and Lower Albert Road, winding its way uphill to the Hong Kong Zoological and Botanical Gardens, where it continues as a pedestrian footpath to Robinson Road, and ends at the junction with Hornsey Road and Conduit Road.

== Name ==
Glenealy is the short form of a valley called Glenealy Ravine (己連拿利谷; gei2 lin4 naa4 lei6 guk1). The valley separates Government Hill in the east from Pedder's Hill in the west.

The valley was previously known as Elliot's Vale (義律谷; ji6 leot6 guk1), after Charles Elliot, and the road leading to the house named Glenealy which was located on the site of the present Roman Catholic cathedral is known as Elliot Crescent.

Vale in Elliot's Vale means 'river valley', and a river does indeed run from Victoria Peak down to Central. The Elliot Vale name seems, however, to have been as short-lived as Elliot's administration. The name Glenealy was quickly restored after Elliott's administration ended, and the Ravine suffix added as befitting of the valley's steepness.

== Features ==
Glenealy was also the name of a mansion in the Victorian era. It belonged to an American opium trader, Warren Delano Jr., grandfather of Franklin Delano Roosevelt, the 32nd president of the United States of America. The mansion later gave way to the Cathedral of the Immaculate Conception, the construction of which commenced in 1883. The present address of the cathedral is 16 Caine Road.

Another Glenealy landmark is the 100-year-old Anglican St. Paul's Church in Sheng Kung Hui, whose gates actually open to Wyndham Street. St. Paul's College was founded here, too, in 1851 as a school for boys. It was closed in 1941 due to the Japanese invasion of Hong Kong. After the war it was briefly amalgamated with St. Paul's Girls' School to become St. Paul's Co-educational College, and a new campus was built away from Glenealy on Bonham Road where it became an independent institution.

Glenealy is one of the steepest roads in Hong Kong that is in use by public transport; it has a gradient of 1:5 in the section connecting Robinson Road with Conduit Road. Minibus routes 2*, 3, 3A and 45A all pass along this part of Glenealy, which is often congested during peak hours. The other roads with a 1:5 gradient that are used by public transport are Aberdeen Reservoir Road, Breezy Path, and Castle Road.

The present Glenealy Street is very short, running from Nos. 1–10 only. The nearest point from which to reach Glenealy 1 is an uphill walk from the Hong Kong Fringe Club, whilst the nearest point from which to reach Glenealy 10 is by walking downhill from Caine Road near Caritas House, through a very short pedestrian subway.

A total of three Glenealy street signs can be found – one is tucked away at the far end at the bottom of the hill where it is barely visible; the other is outside the Sheng Kung Hui Kindergarten (part of St. Paul's Church) and does not list the building numbers on that section of the street; the third sign, affixed to the side of Caritas House, is the only one to list the building numbers (10–6).
