= Wyndham Street =

Street in Central, Hong Kong

Coordinates: 22.280479°N 114.155002°E

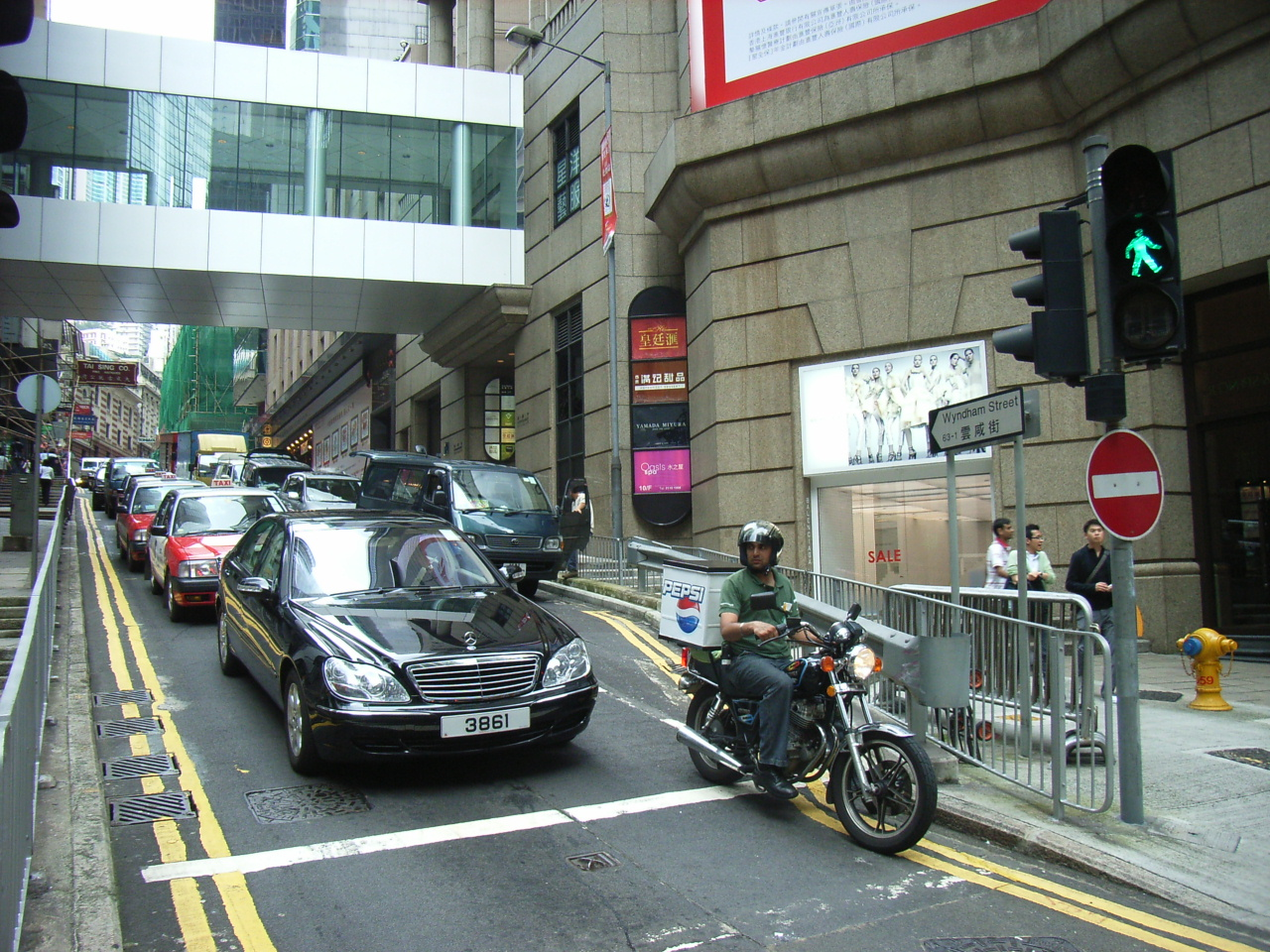
- Wyndham Street
- Traditional Chinese: 雲咸街
- Simplified Chinese: 云咸街
Transcriptions
Standard Mandarin
- Hanyu Pinyin: Yúnxián Jiē
Yue: Cantonese
- Yale Romanization: Wàhnhàahm Gāai
- Jyutping: wan4 haam4 gaai1

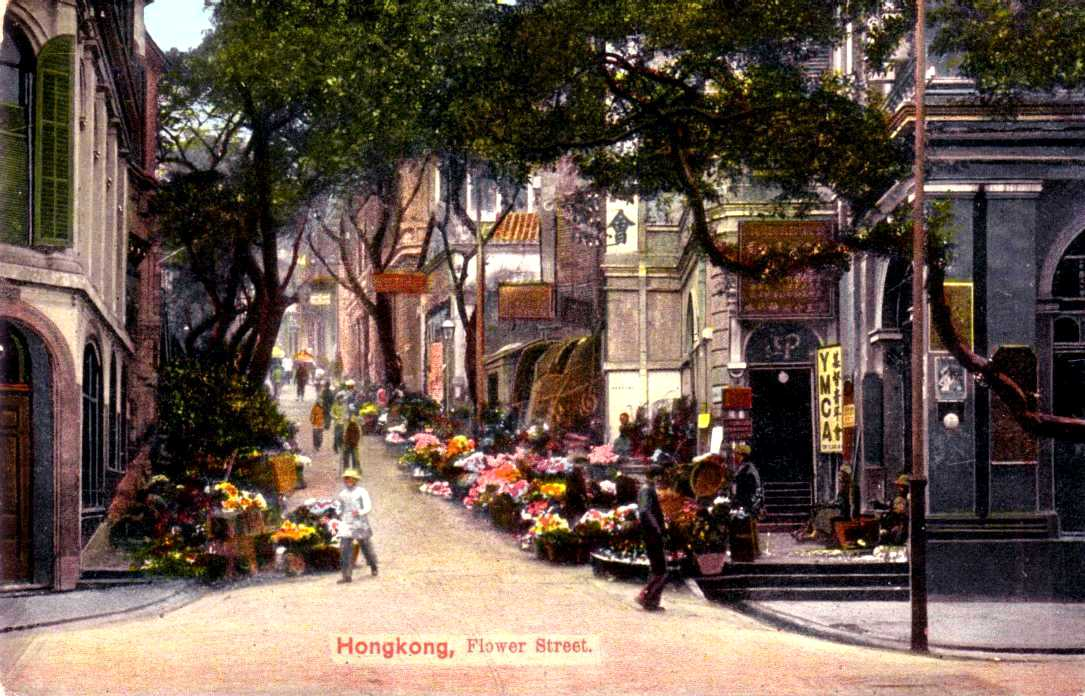
Wyndham Street a.k.a. "Flower Street" circa 1920. Here at its intersection with Queen's Road Central (same location as the above photo)

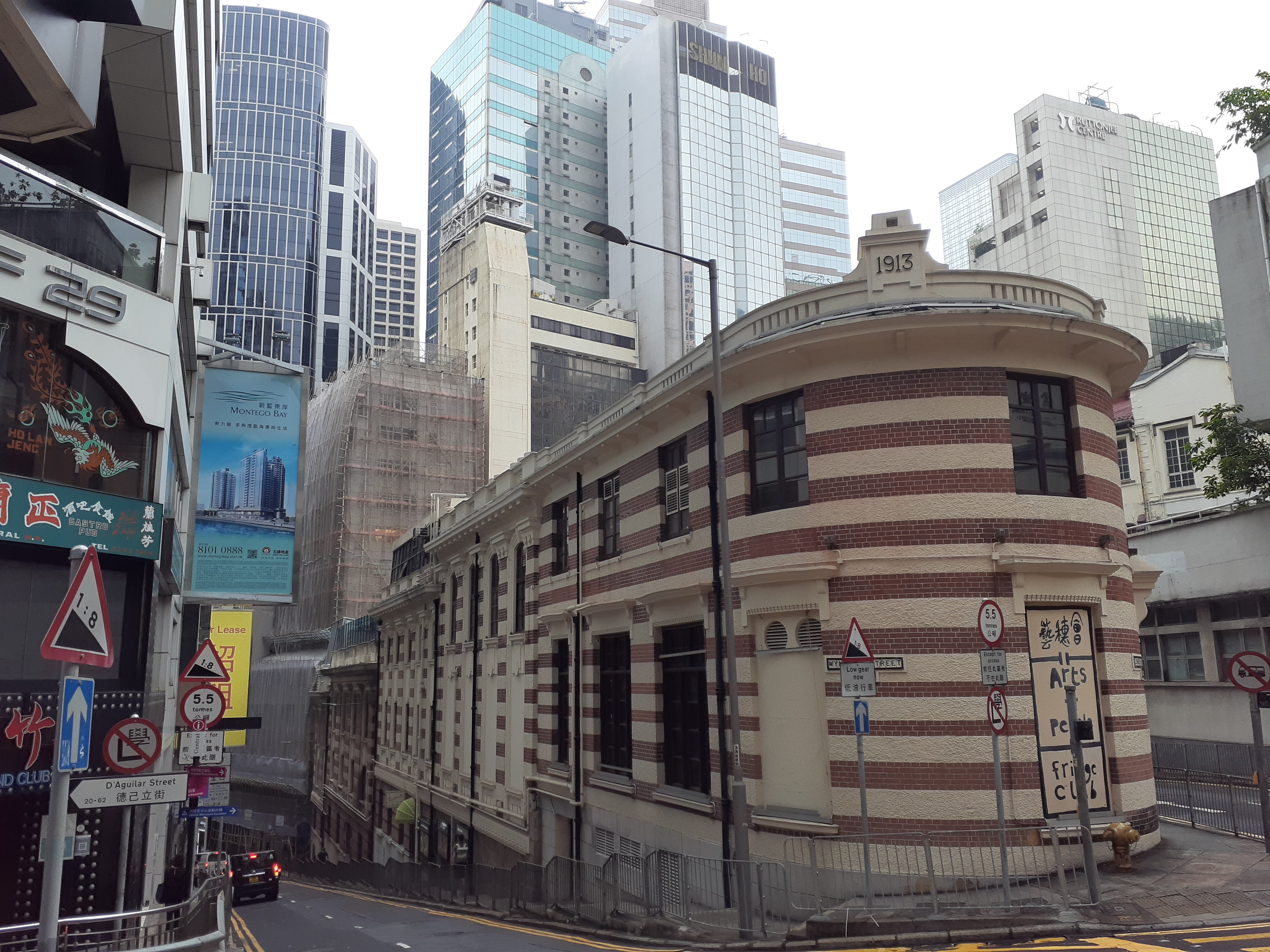
Wyndham Street at its intersection with D'Aguilar Street. The building on the right is the Old Dairy Farm Depot.

Antique cast-iron street nameplate.

Wyndham Street is a one-way street in Central, Hong Kong. It is one of the earliest colonial streets, and was originally known as Pedder's Hill (after William Pedder).

== Location ==
The street starts at the junction with Hollywood Road and Arbuthnot Road, near the Central Police Station, and heads downhill to terminate at Queen's Road Central, near the Entertainment Building.

== History ==
Lieutenant William Pedder the first lieutenant of the Nemesis was the first harbourmaster of Hong Kong, and established Pedder Street as the centre of Victoria City's commerce in the early days of the colony. Pedder had his office built on the cliffs above what is now Wyndham Street. For many years, the site on the top was known as Pedder's Hill.

The street was later renamed in honour of Sir Charles Wyndham, who served as the British Colonial Secretary in the early 1840s.

In the early 20th century, Wyndham Street was nicknamed "Flower Street" because of the numerous stalls selling flowers. In 1928, the flower stalls were moved to D'Aguilar Street, and the "Flower Street" name became attached to the new location.

== See also ==
- List of streets and roads in Hong Kong
