= Lower Albert Road =

Road in Hong Kong

Coordinates: 22°16′48″N 114°09′23″E

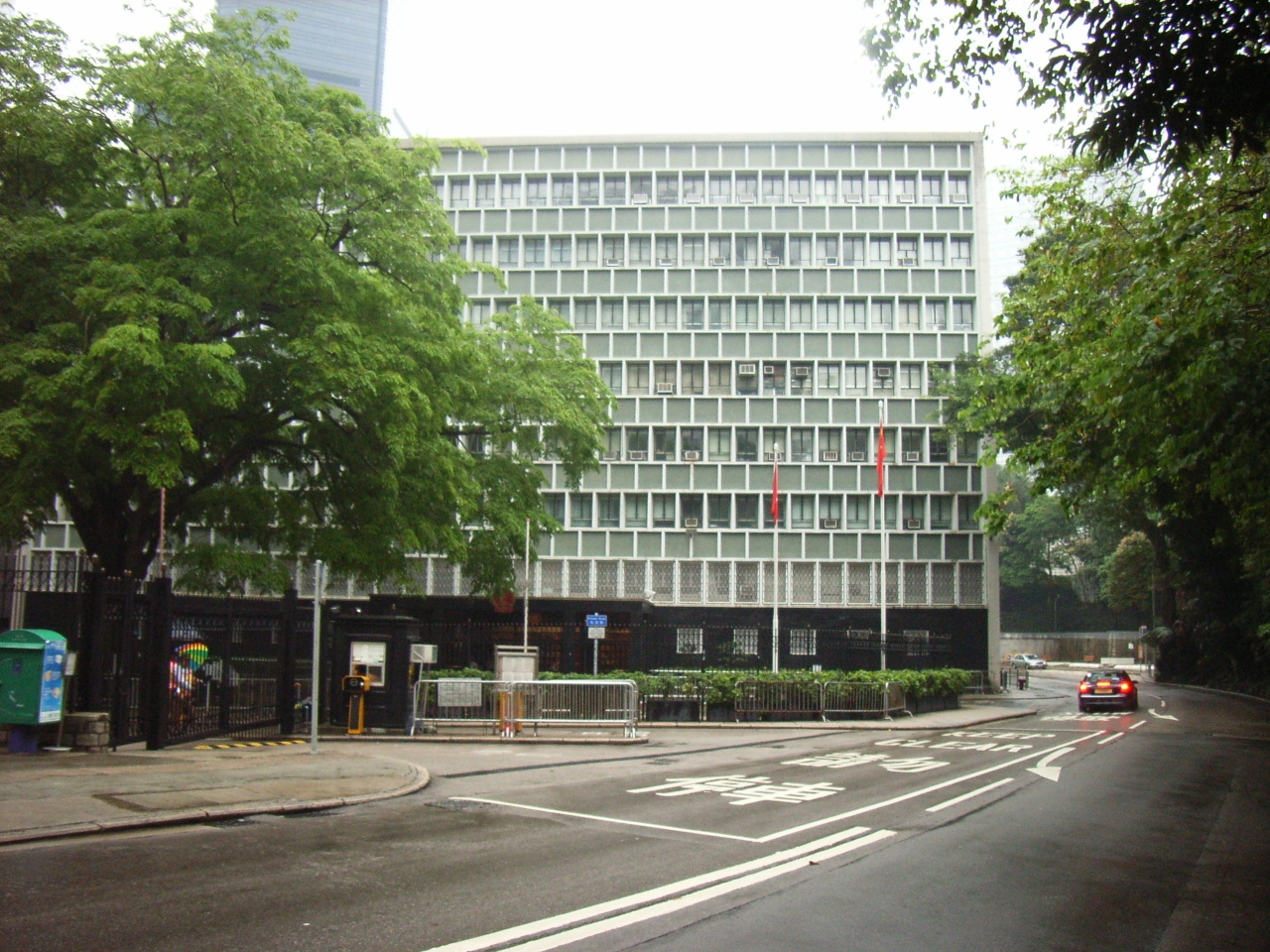
- The Main Wing of Former Central Government Offices at Lower Albert Road
- Traditional Chinese: 下亞厘畢道
- Simplified Chinese: 下亚厘毕道
Transcriptions
Standard Mandarin
- Hanyu Pinyin: Xià Yàlíbì Dào
Yue: Cantonese
- Jyutping: ha6 nga3 lei4 bat1 dou6
- IPA: [hàː ŋɐ̄lȅipɐ́t tòu]

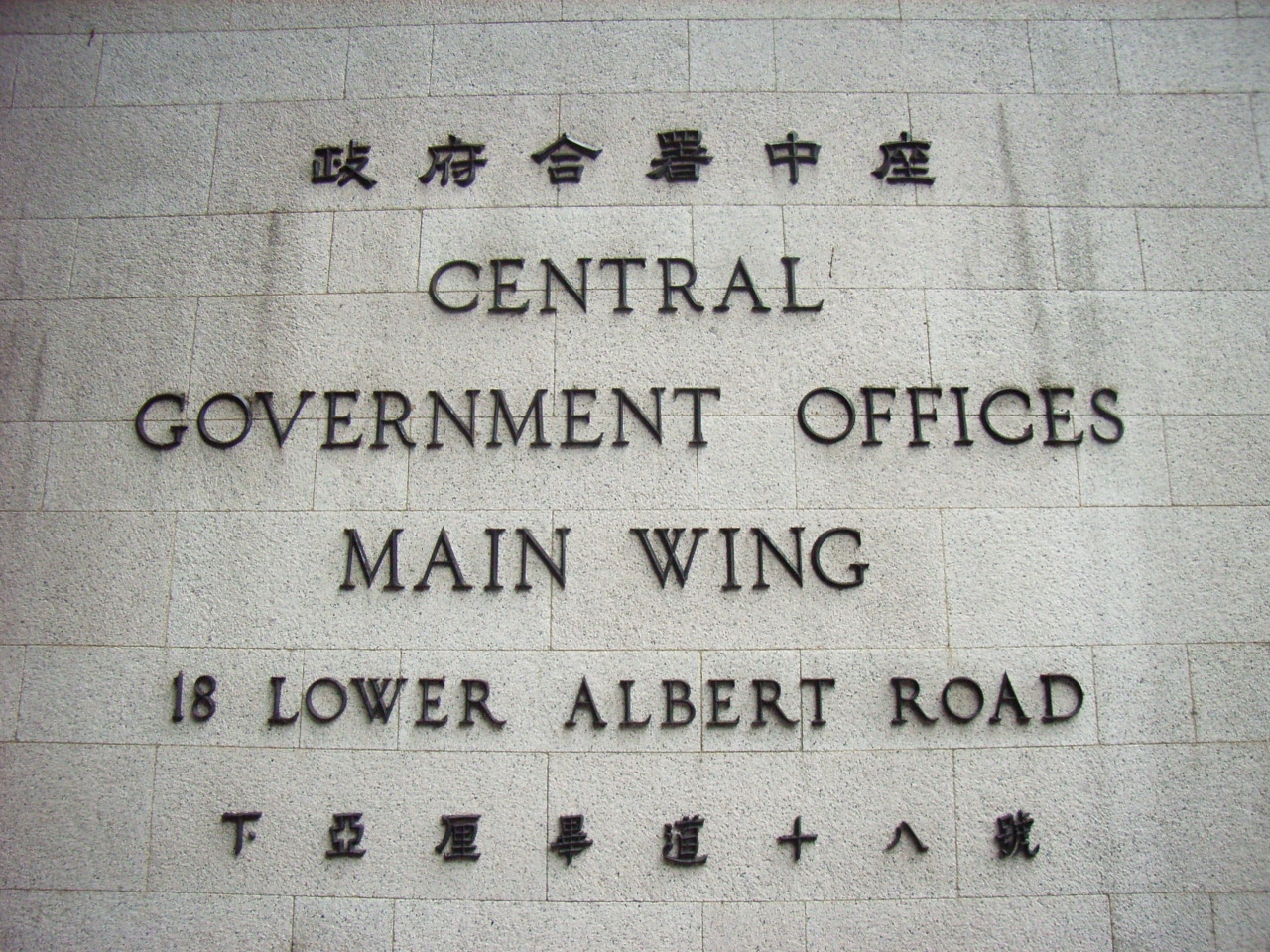
The sign and address of the Main Wing of Former Central Government Offices

Lower Albert Road (Chinese: 下亞厘畢道; Jyutping: haa6 aa3 lei4 bat1 dou6) is a road on the Government Hill in the Central area of Hong Kong.

The road was named after Prince Albert of Saxe-Coburg and Gotha, the consort of Queen Victoria.

== Features ==
The south major entrance of the Former Central Government Offices, where major officials worked until 2011, is located at the Lower Albert Road and was another common destination for protests after Government House of Upper Albert Road. The East and Main Wings of the Former Central Government Offices are on Lower Albert. The West Wing address is on Ice House Street.

Starting from the junction with Wyndham Street and Glenealy near the Fringe Club (Old Dairy Farm Depot), Lower Albert Road passes the Bishop's House and meets Ice House Street near Hong Kong Central Hospital. It branches Upper Albert Road beneath Government House and goes along the south side of Former Central Government Offices and ends in Garden Road near the terminus of Peak Tram.

As it is part of early development of Victoria City, some old ficus microcarpa are located beside the road.

== See also ==
- List of streets and roads in Hong Kong
