= Fringe Club =

Not-for-profit arts organisation

Coordinates: 22.28014°N 114.15575°E

- 藝穗會
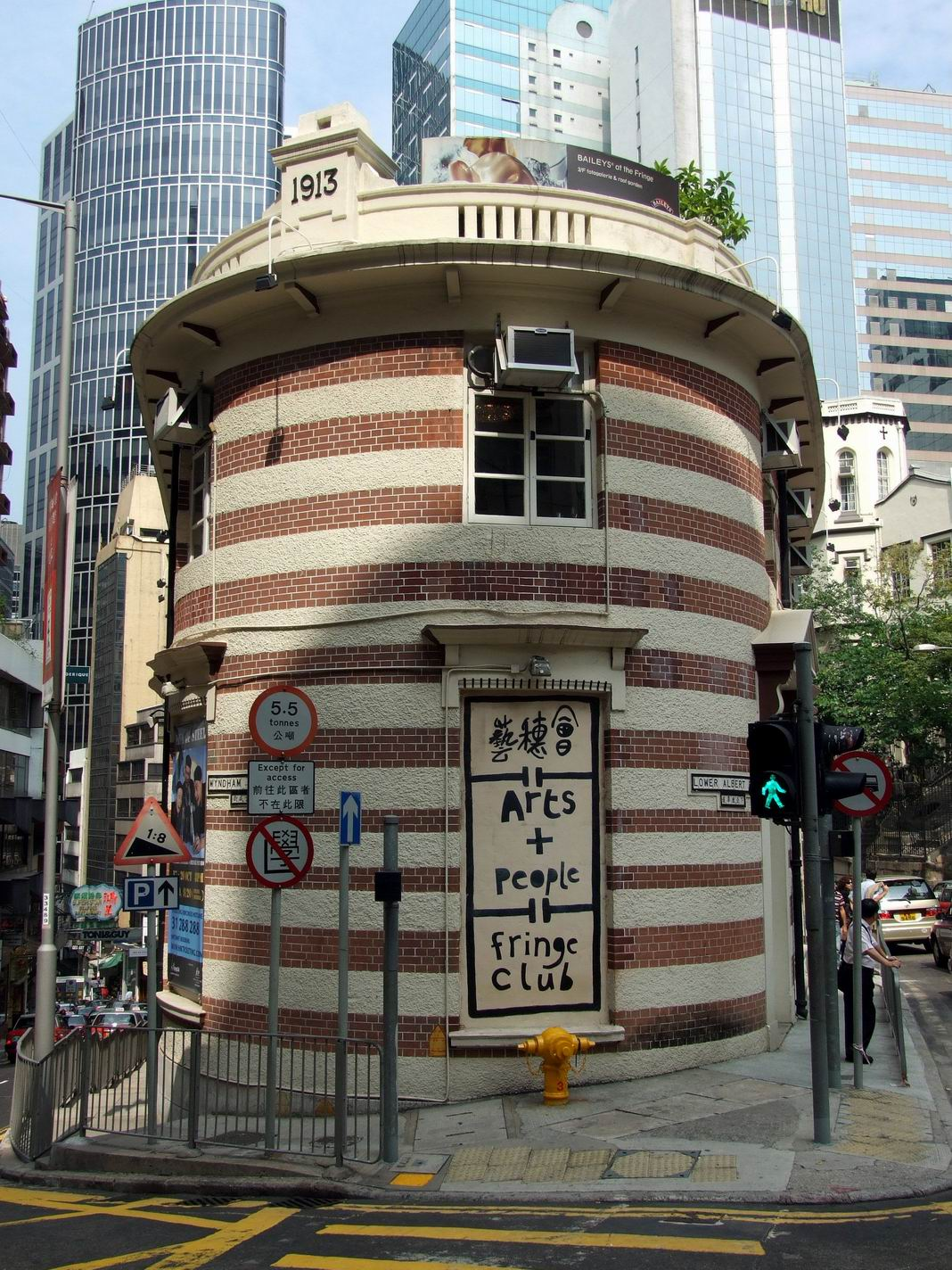
- Formation: 1983
- Type: Not-for-profit arts organisation
- Headquarters: 2 Lower Albert Road, Central, Hong Kong
- Director: Benny Chia
- Chairman: Wailee Chow
- Board of directors: Anson Chan; Antony Szeto; Wu Chi Wai; Douglas Young Chi-chiu
- Website: hkfringeclub.com

Fringe Club
- Traditional Chinese: 藝穗會
- Simplified Chinese: 艺穗会
Transcriptions
Standard Mandarin
- Hanyu Pinyin: Yì Suì Huì
Yue: Cantonese
- Yale Romanization: Ngaih seuih wúih
- Jyutping: Ngai6 soei6 wui5

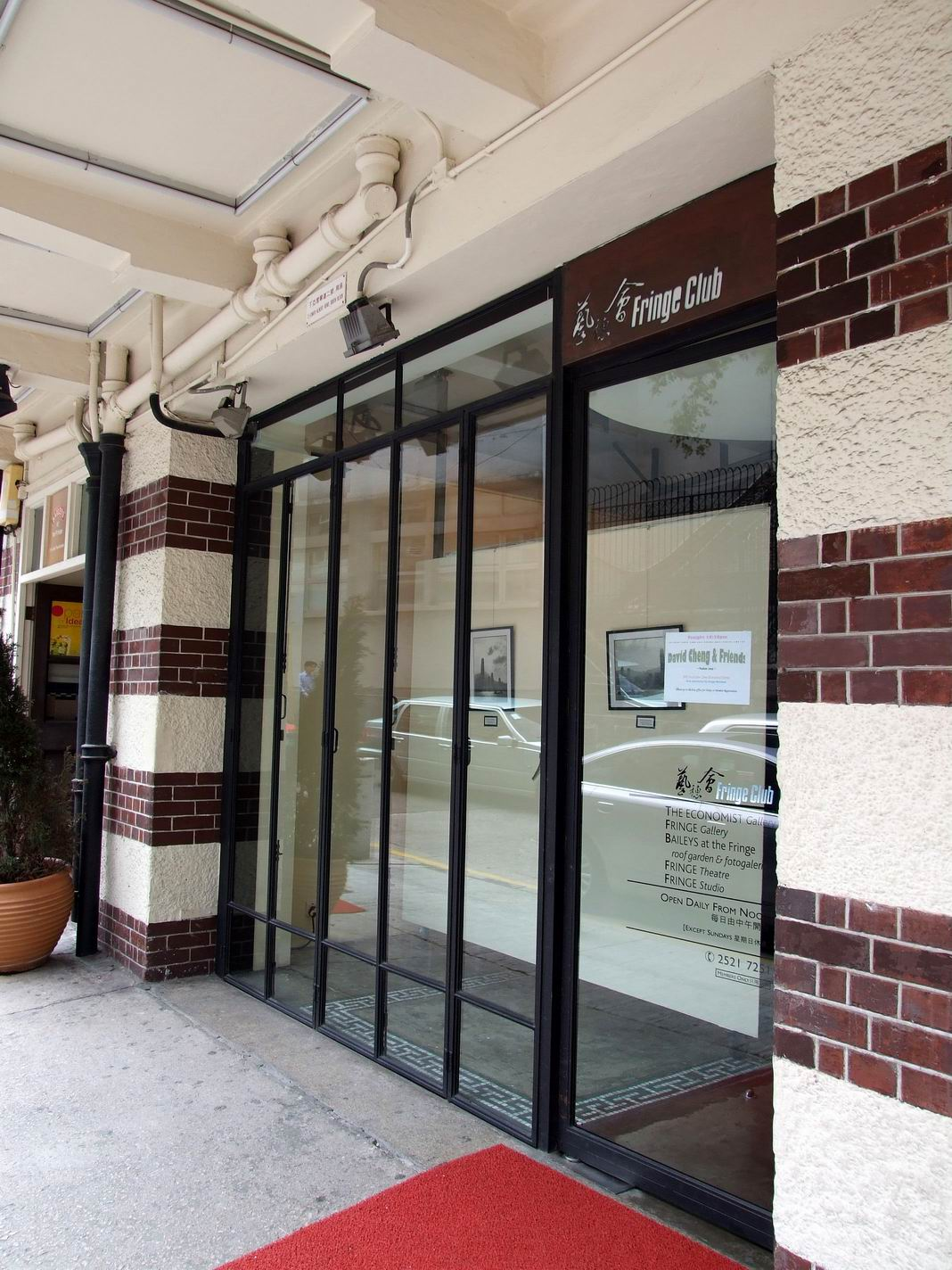
Fringe Club main entrance

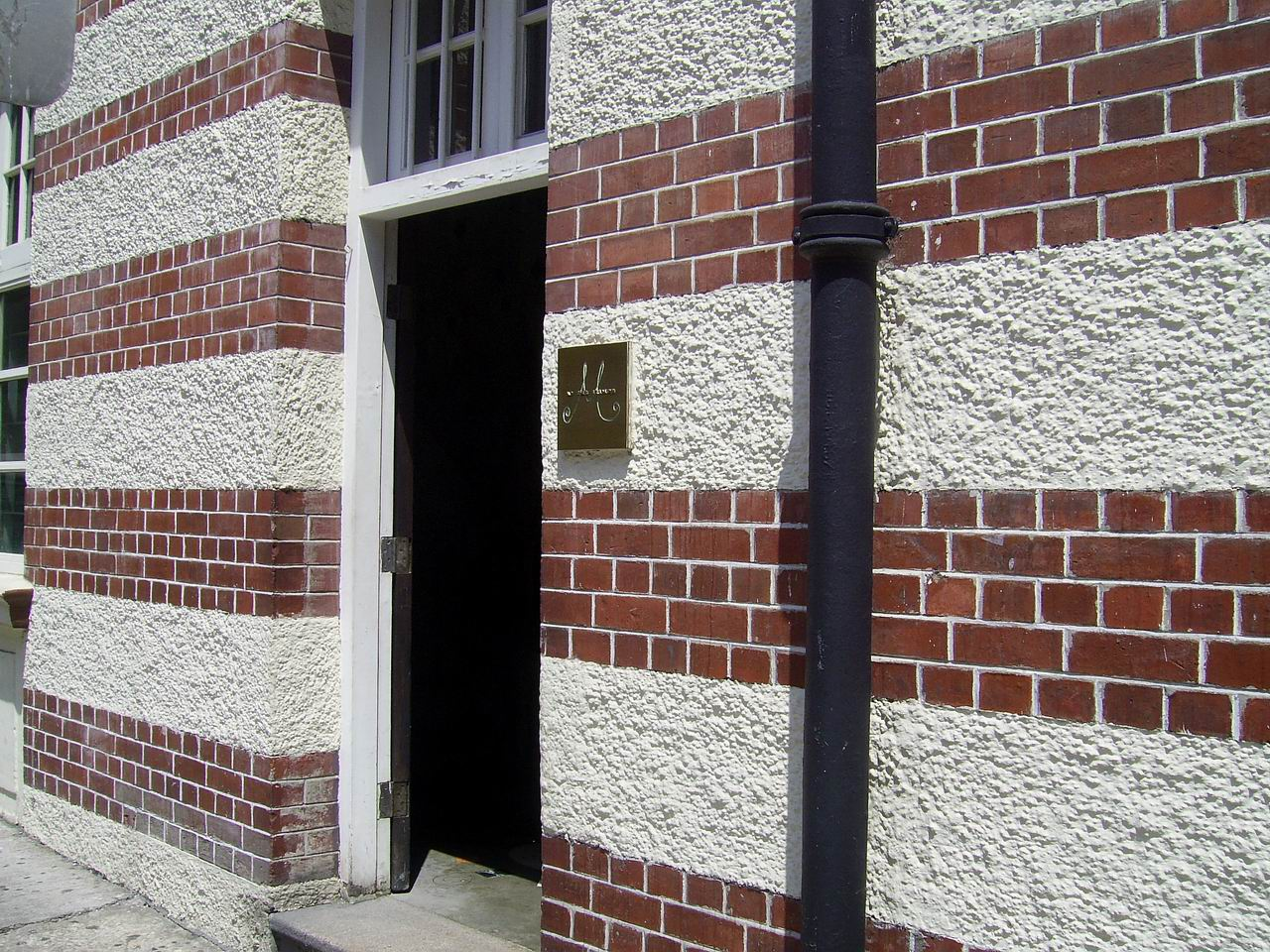
"M at the Fringe" entrance

Founded by Benny Chia in 1984, the Fringe Club is a not-for-profit arts organisation. Its mission is to help emergent artists, promote Hong Kong artists abroad through cultural exchange and overseas touring, and conserve and develop Hong Kong cultural heritage.

It provides rent-free contemporary arts space for exhibitions and performances. It is located in 2 Lower Albert Road, Central District. It is housed in a Grade-I heritage building, the old Dairy farm cold storage depot, built circa 1892 in a late Victorian eclectic style. The facade of this building is distinguished by its "blood and bandages" brickwork.

== Premises ==
In 1892, Dairy Farm built a low-rise brick and stucco building on Lower Albert Road in Central for use as a cold storage warehouse. This warehouse was later renovated and expanded in 1913 to include a dairy shop, a room for meat smoking, a cold storage room for winter clothes and residency for the general manager. The building later evolved into the company headquarters until the company moved in the 1970s. The abandoned building was acquired by the Hong Kong Fringe Club in 1984.

- The building has undergone many major renovations to make it a vibrant place for contemporary arts since the Fringe Club moved in, in 1983. In 2001, the building won a Hong Kong Government Heritage Award for its use of the building. It has been categorised as a Grade I historic building.

== Arts venues ==
The Fringe Club has two studio theatres, an exhibition area, a rehearsal room, restaurants, a roof garden and offices. It features and promotes theatre, dance, music and exhibitions.

The operation of this organisation is supported by the Hong Kong Arts Development Council and earned incomes from its food and beverage facilities, ticket sales, advertising, membership fees, sponsorship and donations.

Anita Chan Lai-ling Gallery

Anita Chan Lai-ling Gallery is converted from the garage of the old Dairy Farm Cold Storage Depot. It is now an art space for contemporary work by Hong Kong and international artists.

Fringe Dairy

Fringe Dairy is the only jazz and cabaret space in Hong Kong. The original features are still retained when this place served as the front shop of the old Dairy Farm Cold Storage Depot for selling milk and ice cream, such as the 1913 tiled floor, tall French windows with wooden shutters and overhead fans.

The Jockey Club Studio Theatre

The Jockey Club Studio Theatre was used as dry storage of fur coats of the old Dairy Farm Cold Storage Depot. It is now transformed into a black-box studio.

Fringe Underground

The Fringe Underground Theatre was the warehouse of the old Dairy Farm Cold Storage Depot to process blocks of ice and cold meat. It is now transformed into a theatre for art performance and creative experimentation.

Fringe Vault

Fringe Vault served to keep and store blocks of ice, dairy products and cold meats. It now serves as a cafe, where the original white-tiled walls and other architectural features have been preserved.

Colette Artbar

Colette Artbar was once the staff dormitory of the old Dairy Farm. It is now designed to provide an art space for exhibiting photography and paintings. It is named to commemorate Colette Koo, a multi-talented artist and actress.

NOVE at the Fringe

It was the Taipan’s office and residence. The fireplace can still be found in the room, and the chimney was connected to the rooftop. It is now a Chinese restaurant.
