= Shelley Street =

Street in Central, Hong Kong

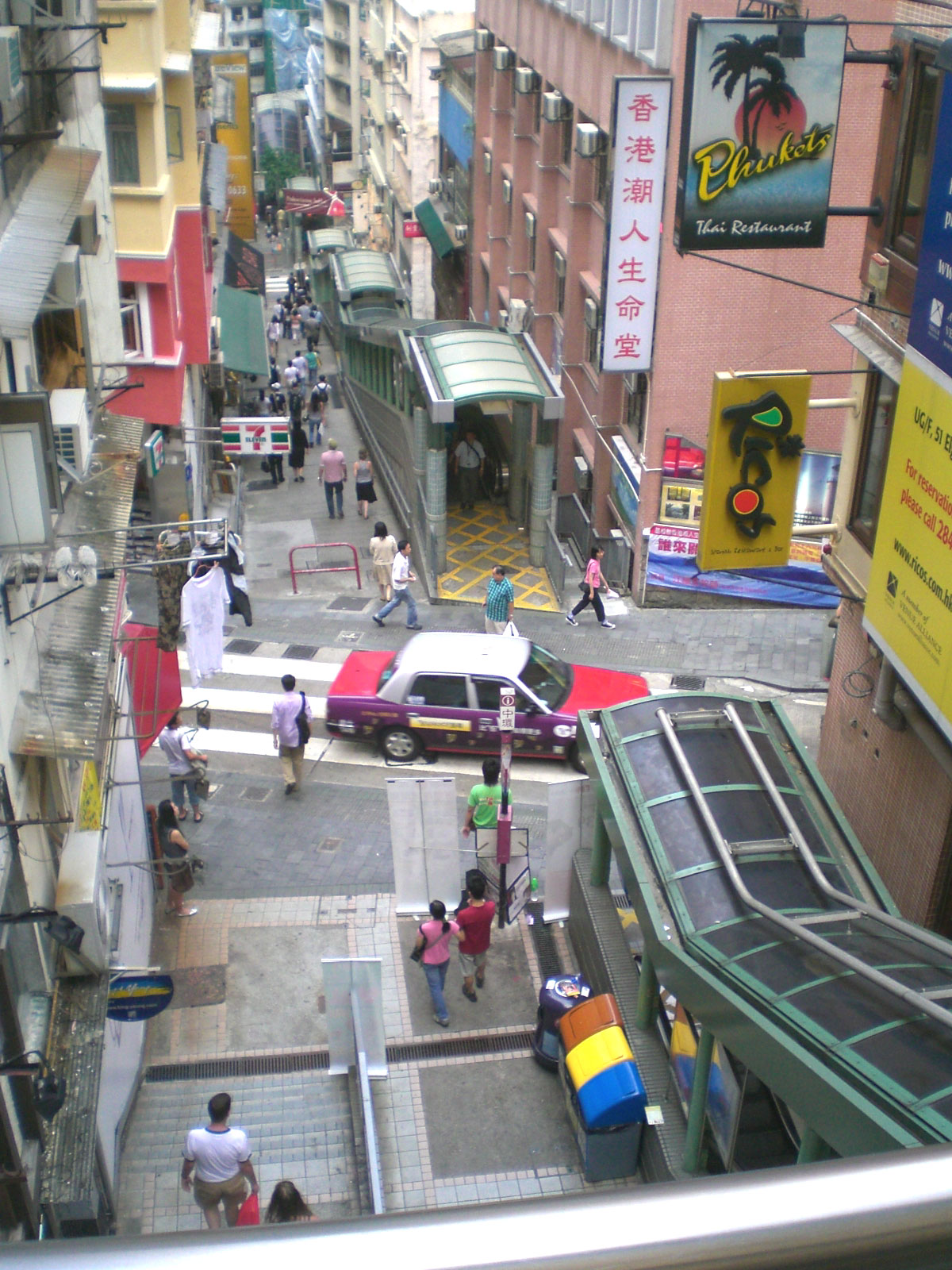
Shelley Street, at its intersection with Elgin Street.

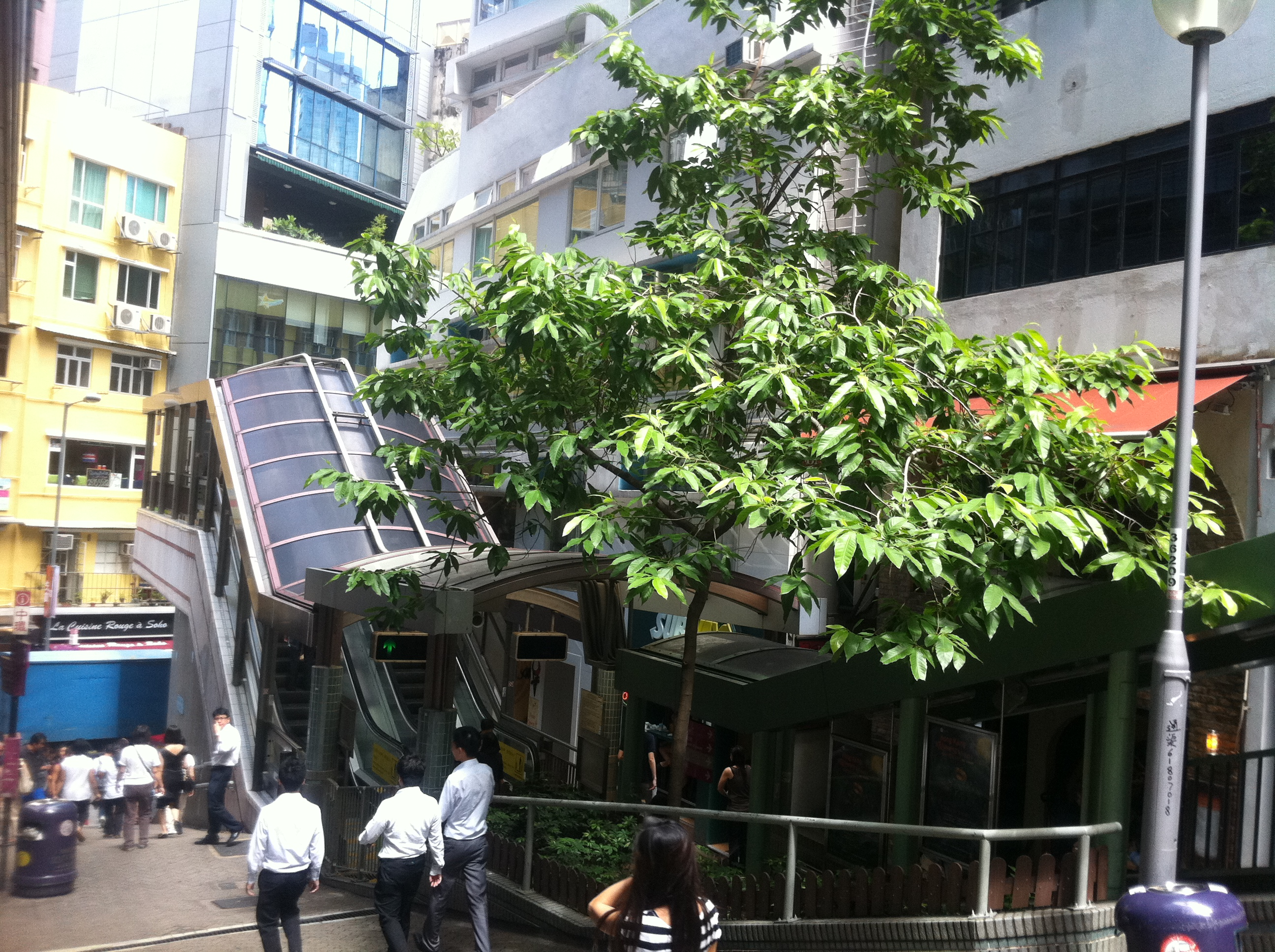
The lower end of Shelley Street, near Hollywood Road.

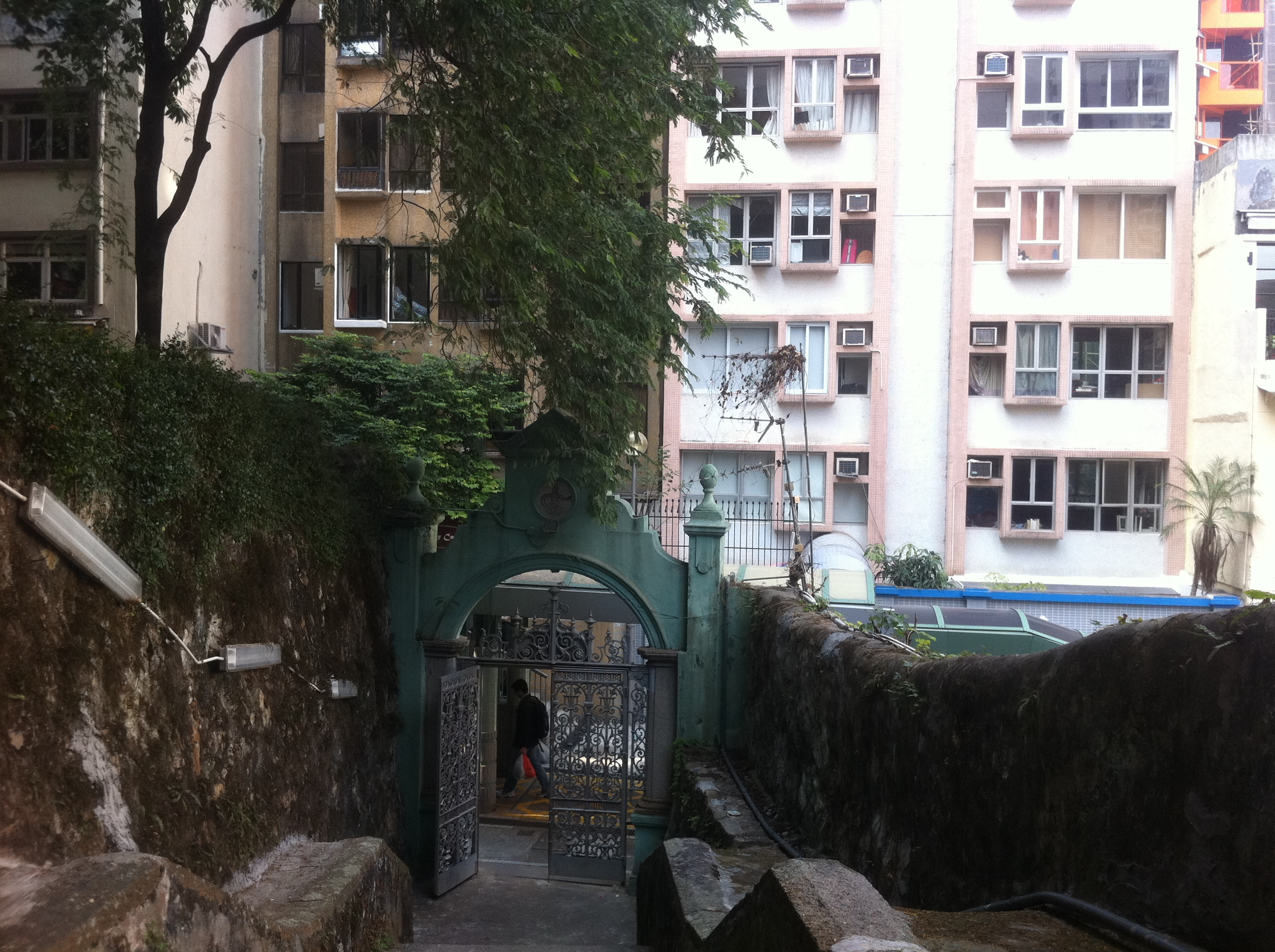
Shelley Street viewed from Jamia Mosque.

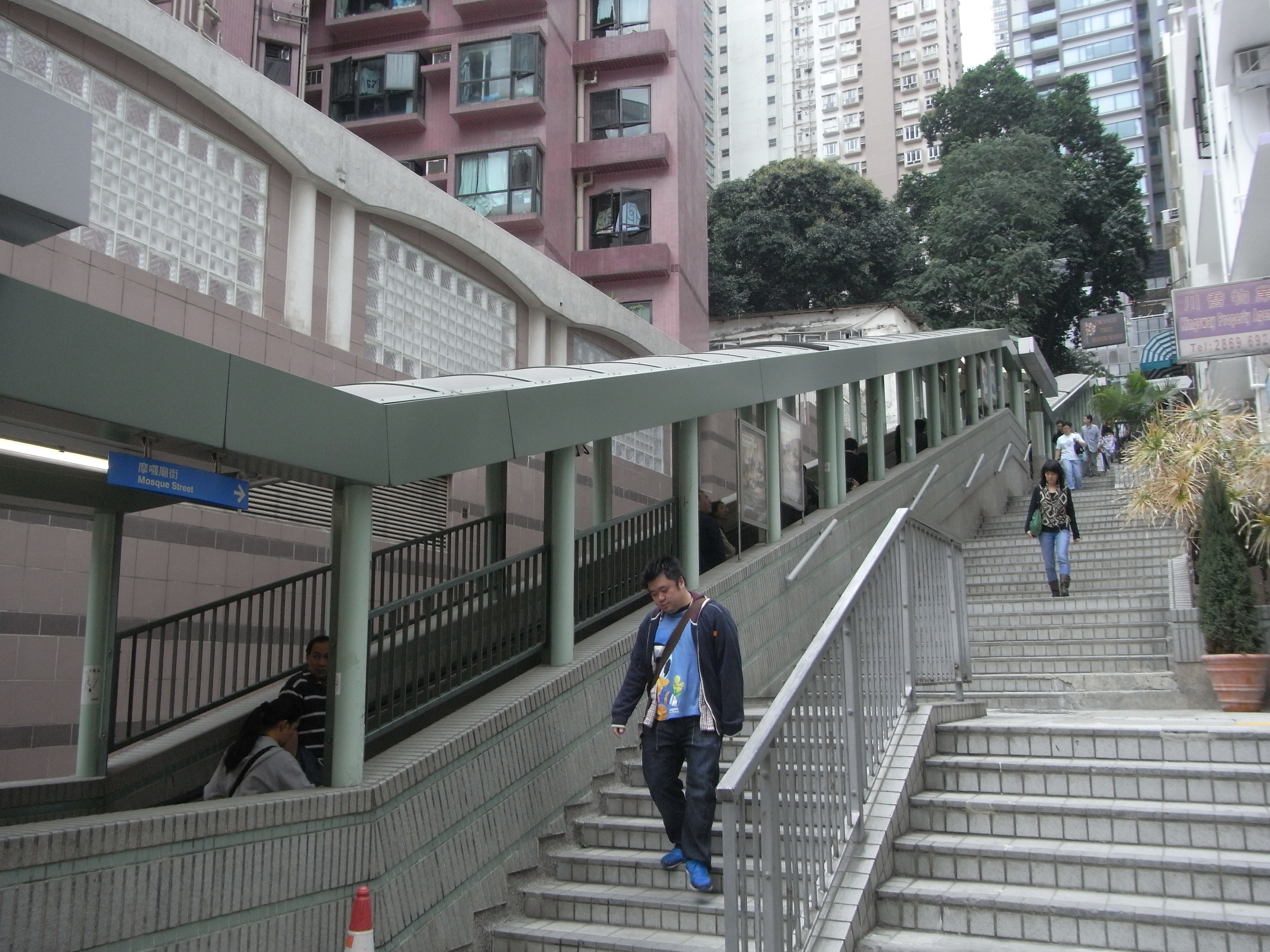
Shelley Street near Rednaxela Terrace.

Vintage street nameplate.

Shelley Street (Chinese: 些利街) is a ladder street in Central, Hong Kong. The Central–Mid-Levels escalators run along the entire length of the street.

== Name ==
The street is named after Adolphus Edward Shelley, an early British colonial administrator. The second son of Sir John Shelley, 6th Baronet, he arrived unemployed in Hong Kong from India in June 1844 with vague recommendation letters from Lord Stanley, the then Secretary of State for War and the Colonies, and soon became Auditor General – a position he held until 1846. Shelley was described in a private letter by Sir John Francis Davis, the second Governor of Hong Kong, to Lord Grey as "dissipated, in debt, negligent, guilty of falsehood, and quite unfit for the high office". In an 1844 letter to James Matheson, Alexander Matheson described Shelley as a "swindler". He is said to have escaped Hong Kong because of poor investments, and in 1847, was appointed Assistant Auditor-General of Accounts of Mauritius.

== Location ==
Shelley Street runs uphill from Hollywood Road to Robinson Road in the Mid-Levels. On the way, it intersects Tsun Wing Lane, Staunton Street, Elgin Street, Caine Road, Leung Fai Terrace, Prince's Terrace, Rednaxela Terrace ("Alexander" spelled backwards), Mosque Street, and Mosque Junction.

== History ==
Until the early 20th century, the area was mostly inhabited by Portuguese people working as clerks for large British companies. The Club Lusitano, a gathering place of the local Portuguese community, was located on Shelley Street below Caine Road until 1866, when it was moved to its present location at Ice House Street (according to other sources, the club was located at Shelley Street from December 1866 to 1920).

The Central–Mid-Levels escalators opened in 1993.

== Features ==
The lower part of the street is part of the SoHo entertainment area which is home to many restaurants, bars, and shops.

The upper part of the street is mostly residential.

Jamia Mosque is located near the top of the street at its junction with Mosque Street. It was built in 1849, and was the first mosque in Hong Kong.

== See also ==
- List of streets and roads in Hong Kong
