= Bakehouse (disambiguation) =

Bakehouse may refer to:

- Bakery, an establishment that makes and/or sells flour-based products
- Bakehouse (bakery), a Swiss bakery chain in Hong Kong
- Bakehouse (building), used for baking bread
- Bakehouse (Dirmstein), a cultural heritage bakehouse in Dirmstein, Germany
- Bakehouse Theatre in Angas Street, Adelaide, South Australia
- Bakehouse Art Complex, arts complex in Miami
