= Central–Mid-Levels escalator =

Outdoor escalator and walkway system in Hong Kong

- Outdoor escalator and walkway
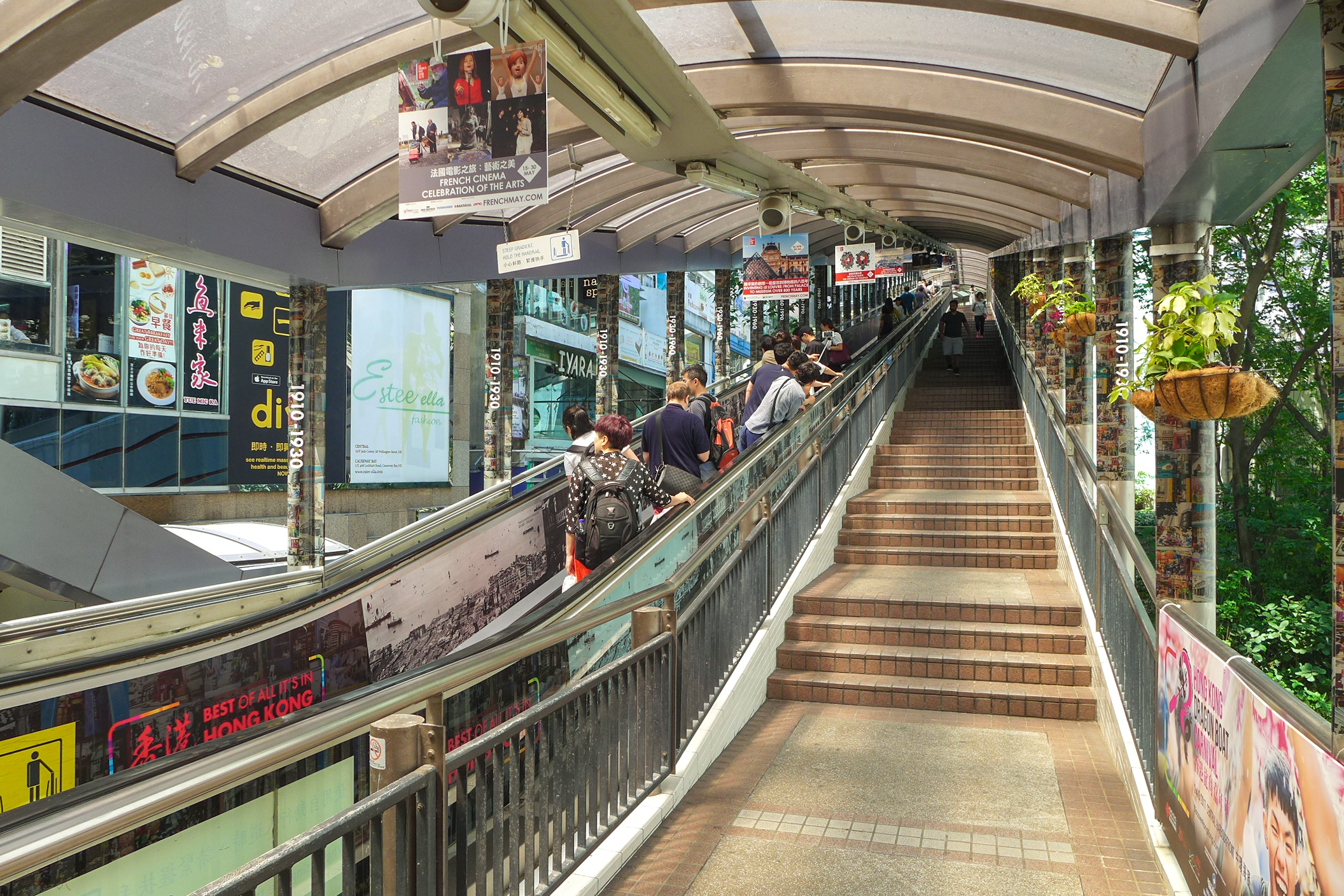
- Inside the escalator system
- Features: Escalators, walkways, moving walkways, stairs
- Constructed: 1991–1993
- Opened: 15 October 1993; 32 years ago
- Height: 135 m (443 ft)
- Length: 800 m (2,600 ft)
- Owner: Government of Hong Kong
- Location: Hong Kong Island, Hong Kong
- Interactive map of Central–Mid-Levels escalator
- Coordinates: 22°17′1″N 114°9′17″E
- Website: Transport Department profile

Central–Mid-Levels escalator
- Traditional Chinese: 中環至半山自動扶梯系統
- Simplified Chinese: 中环至半山自动扶梯系统
Transcriptions
Standard Mandarin
- Hanyu Pinyin: Zhōnghuán zhì Bànshān Zìdòngfútī Xìtǒng
Yue: Cantonese
- Yale Romanization: zùng waan zí bún sàan zìh dùhng fu tài hàih tūng
- Jyutping: zung1 waan4 zi3 bun3 saan1 zi6 dung6 fu4 tai1 hai6 tung2
- IPA: [t͡sʊ̋ŋ.wä̏ːn.t͡sīː.pūːn.sä̋ːn.t͡sìː.tʊ̀ŋ.fȕː.tʰɐ̋i̯.hɐ̀i̯.tʰʊ᷄ŋ]

The Central–Mid-Levels escalator and walkway system in Hong Kong is the second longest outdoor covered escalator system in the world, after the Wushan Goddess Escalator in Chongqing, China. The system covers over 800 m (2,600 ft) in distance and traverses an elevation of over 135 m (443 ft) from bottom to top. It opened in 1993 to provide an improved link between Central and the Mid-Levels on Hong Kong Island.

As part of ongoing renewal works, the escalators at the top of the system between Robinson Road and Conduit Road were replaced and returned to service on 11 July 2018. Three refurbished escalators between Mosque Street and Robinson Road followed in early 2019, while two replacement escalators between Caine Road and Elgin Street opened in June 2019.

Apart from serving as a mode of transport, the system is also a tourist attraction and is lined with restaurants, bars, and shops.

== History ==
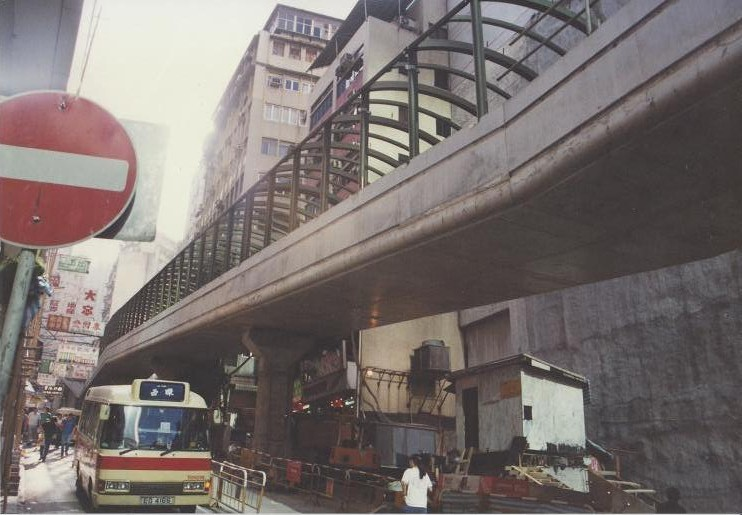
Central–Mid-Levels escalators under construction in the early 1990s

=== Origins ===
The project began in the early 1980s when the government found that much of the east-west traffic in the area arose from north-south travel demand, as the steep topography did not allow for major roads to be built straight up the hill. There was talk of linking Central and Mid-Levels with escalators, a monorail, or a cable-car system.

In late 1982, private consultants Peter Y.S. Pun and Associates and MVA Asia were commissioned to investigate traffic improvement measures in Central. In their report entitled A Study of the Transport Requirements of the Mid-Levels and Central District, the consultant recommended, among other things, to build an "escalator assisted pedestrian route" linking Mid-Levels to the existing Central Elevated Walkway system and a new bus terminus that they proposed should be built on the site of the Central Market. This proposal was well-received by Mid-Levels residents.

=== Construction and opening ===
The Highways Department commissioned Maunsell Consultants Asia to draw up a detailed design for the system. The Executive Council approved the project on 16 March 1990. Construction began at the end of February 1991, and was carried out by a joint venture between Hong Kong contractor Paul Y. – ITC Construction and the French company Sogen. It took two and a half years to build, and opened to the public at 6:00 am on 15 October 1993.

The opening of the escalator fuelled the proliferation of new restaurants and other commercial operations in the intermediate levels, and contributed to the development of the "SoHo" entertainment district. New businesses opened up in the first or second floors of existing buildings, and added signage to attract escalator riders.

=== Capital cost ===
The system cost HK$240 million (US$31 million) to build, although it was originally approved in March 1990 with a budget of $100 million and annual maintenance costs of $950,000. In November 1996, the Director of Audit issued a report that called the project a "white elephant", saying that it failed to achieve the primary objective of reducing traffic between the Mid-Levels and Central, as well as over-running its budget by 153 per cent. The Highways Department's poor handling of the project was the main reason for having five cost revisions of the project since the budget had been initially approved. The Director of Audit blamed it for failing to address the risks and complexities associated with the project in the pre-tender estimates, and costs rising because of delays. Land resumption costs were also underestimated by $74 million (or 180 per cent). The report also points out that a "before-and-after" study by the Transport Department indicated no obvious reduction in traffic congestion.

== Description ==
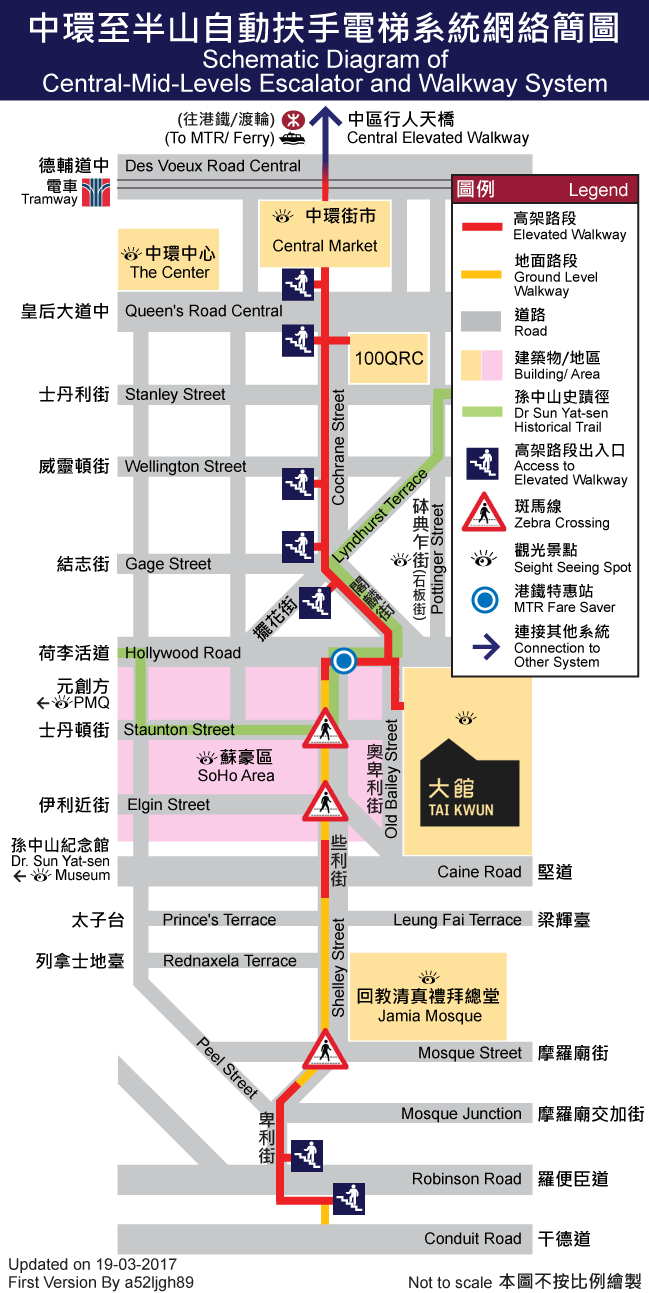
Schematic diagram of the system

=== Route ===
The escalators exist because Hong Kong Island is dominated by steep, hilly terrain, which makes it the home of several unusual methods of transport up and down the slopes. The Central–Mid-Levels escalator system was featured on the CNN website as one of the "coolest commutes" in the world in March 2015.

It links Queen's Road Central in Central with Conduit Road in the Mid-Levels, travelling primarily up Cochrane Street and Shelley Street. At Queen's Road Central, the Central–Mid-Levels escalators system is connected through Central Market to the Central Elevated Walkway, an extensive footbridge network covering the Central area.

The escalator system is 800 m (2,600 ft) long with a vertical climb of 135 m (443 ft). The total travel time is twenty minutes, but many people walk while the escalator moves to shorten their trip. Due to the geographical situation, the same distance is equivalent to several miles of zigzagging roads if travelling by car. According to Guinness World Records, these escalators together form the longest outdoor covered escalator system.

=== Design ===
The system includes 18 escalators and three inclined moving walkways. Due to the complex terrain, parts of the system run on elevated concrete structures, while other sections sit at ground level.

The moving walkways have a tread width of one metre (3.28 feet), allowing faster pedestrians to pass slower users. In line with Hong Kong escalator etiquette, slower or idle users generally keep to the right. The three walkways have inclines of 8.1°, 11.9° and 11.7°. Eleven of the escalators have a typical 30° incline, while the remaining seven have a non-standard 17.5° incline.

All the walkways (except for at-grade road crossings) are covered to protect users from the rain, although the sides are open to the elements. The roofing structure was designed to be visually attractive, and incorporates translucent polycarbonate to allow sunlight to illuminate the walkways.

== Operations ==
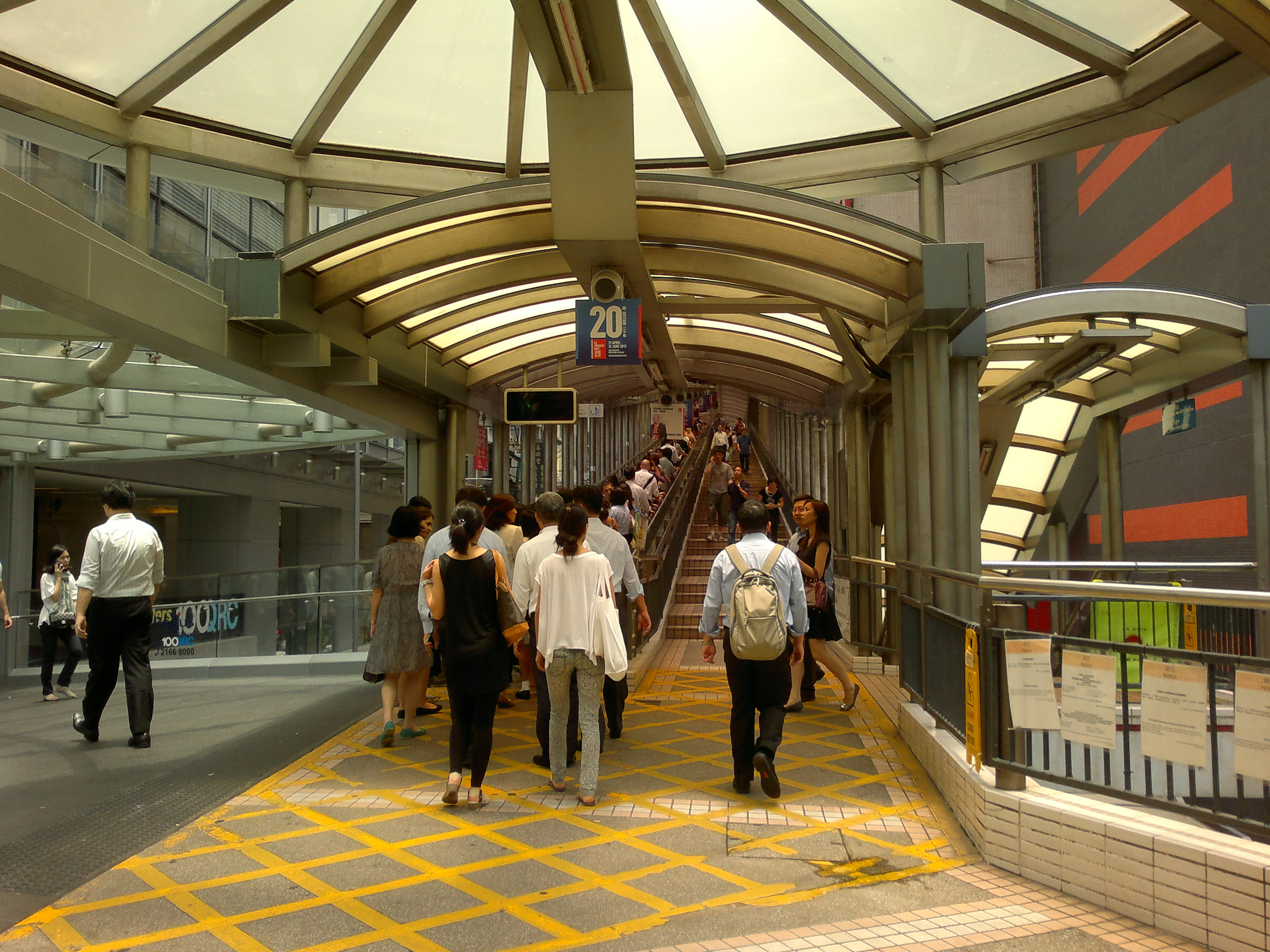
Lower entrance of the system, adjacent to the 100QRC building. This entrance is on a footbridge connecting with the Central Elevated Walkway.

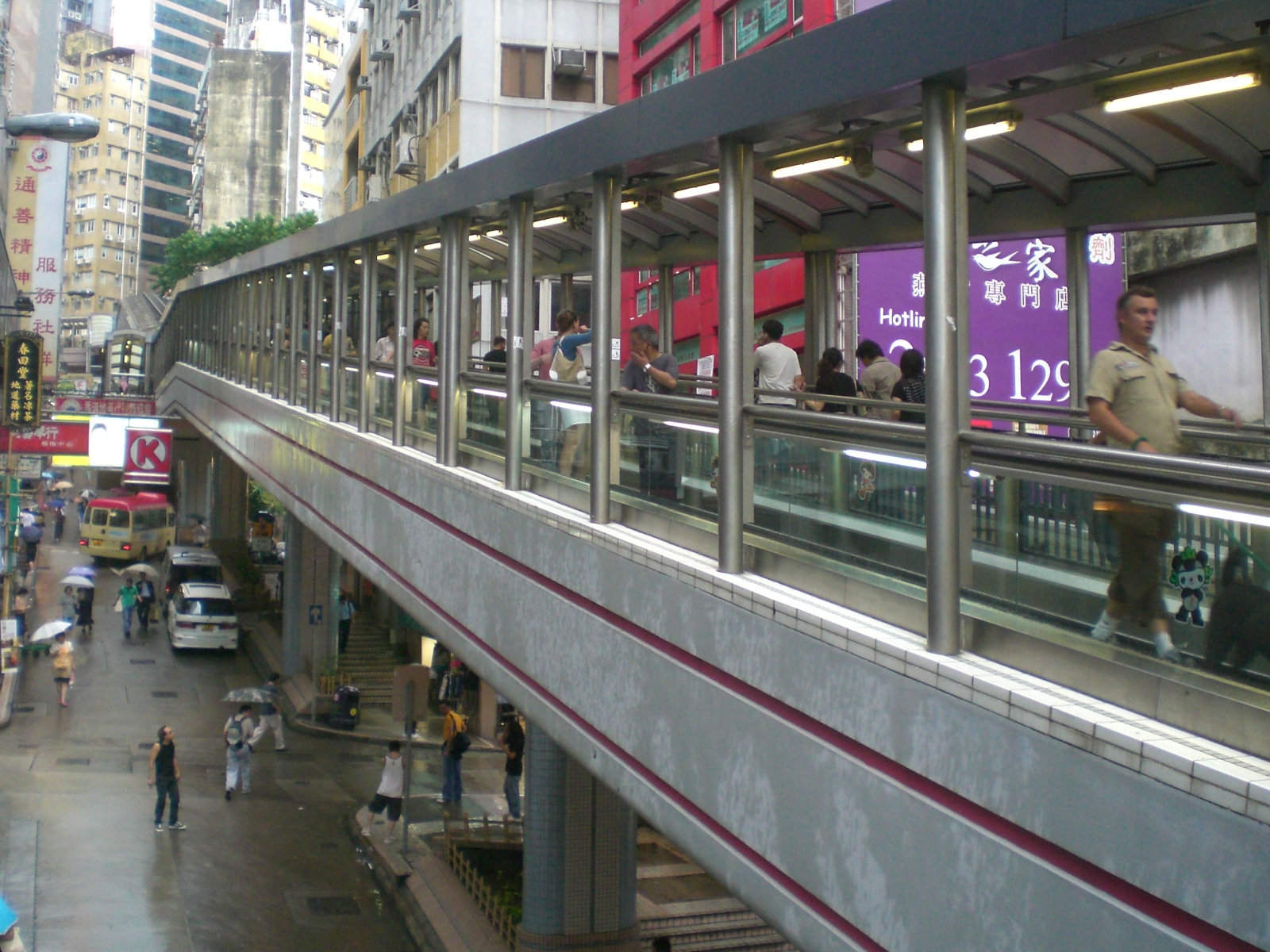
Side view of the system at Queen's Road Central.

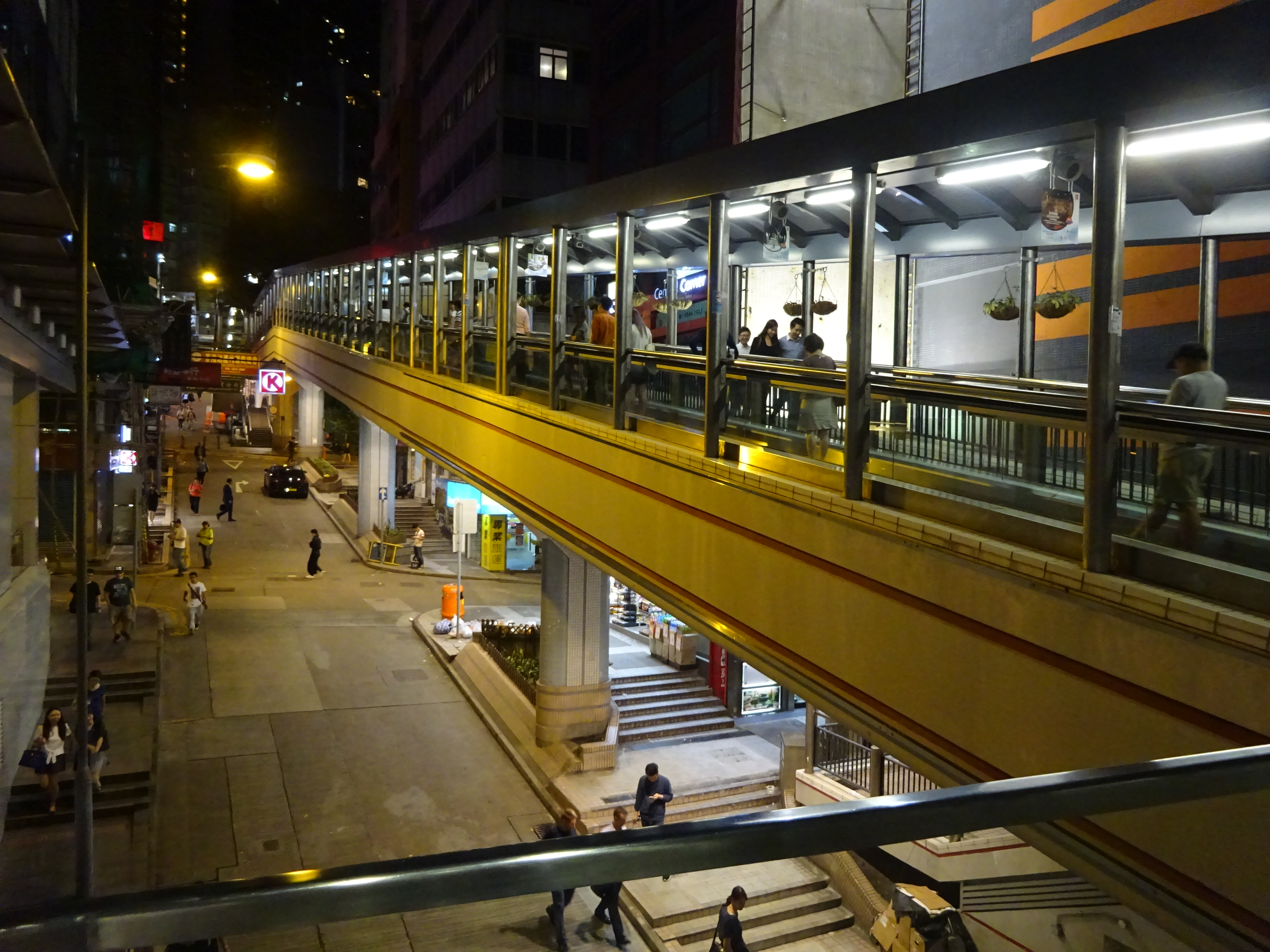
Junction of Cochrane Street and Stanley Street at night

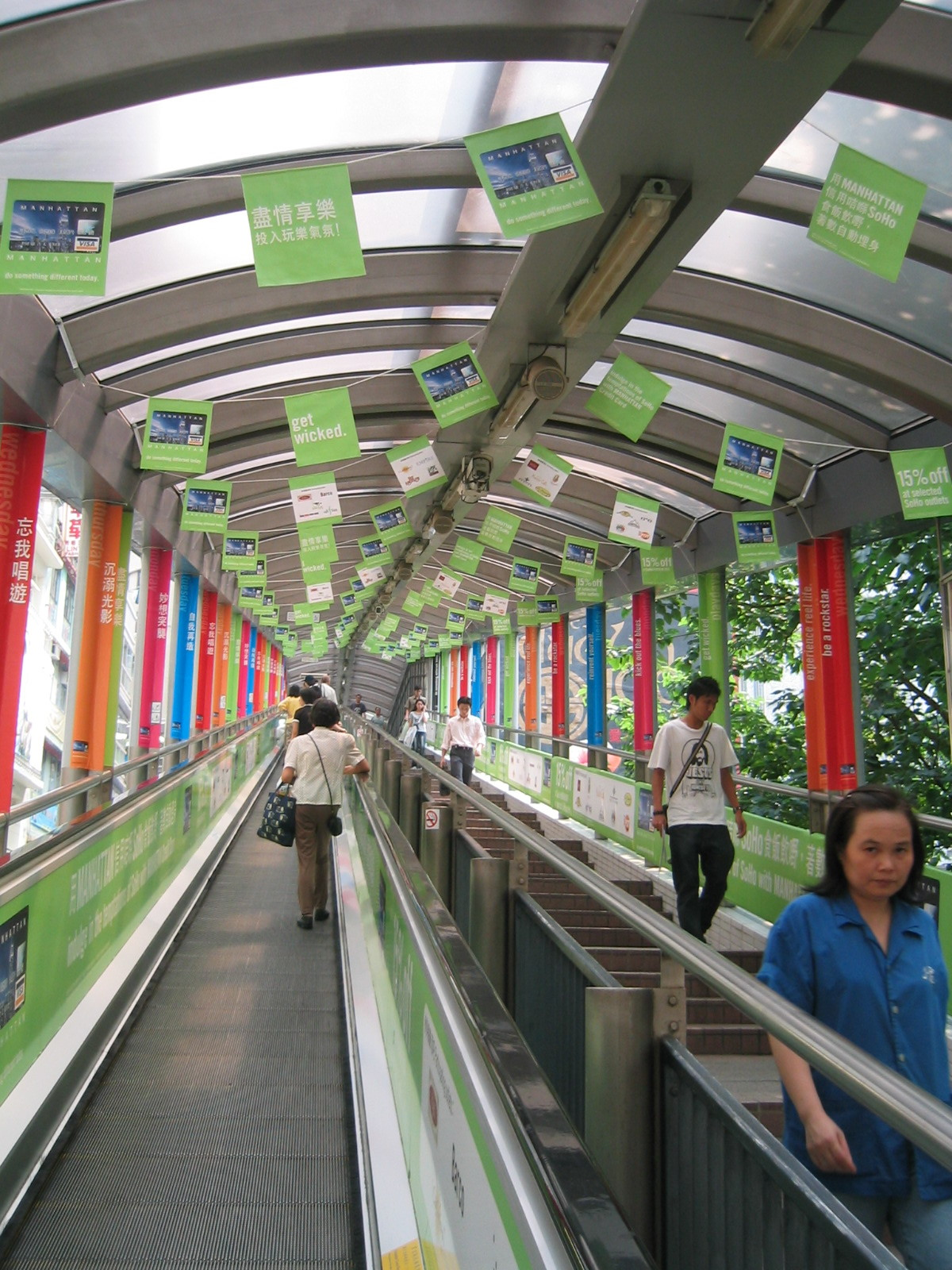
Inside the escalator system. Pictured is an inclined moving walkway section.

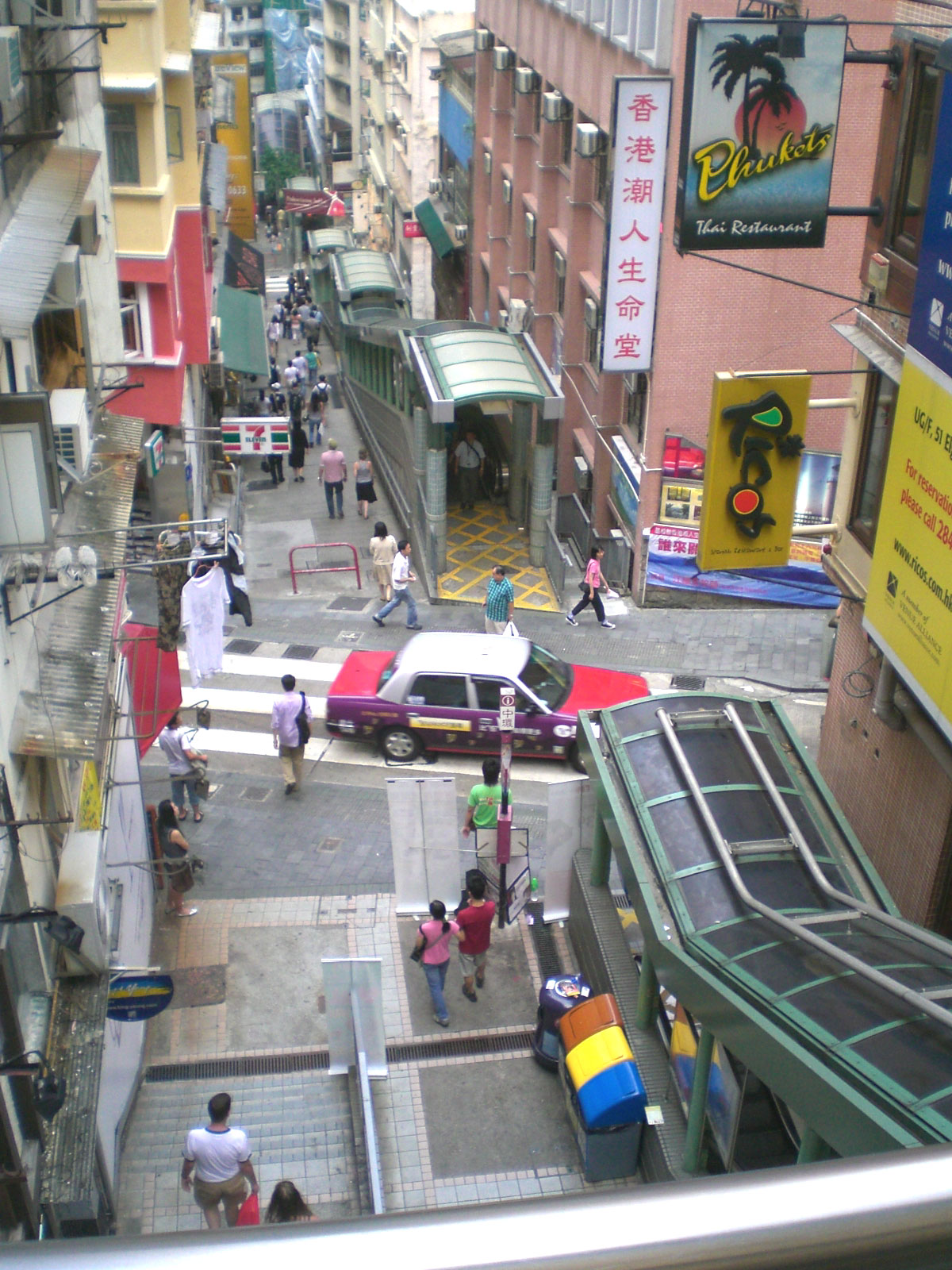
Top view of the system at Shelley Street, at its intersection with Elgin Street

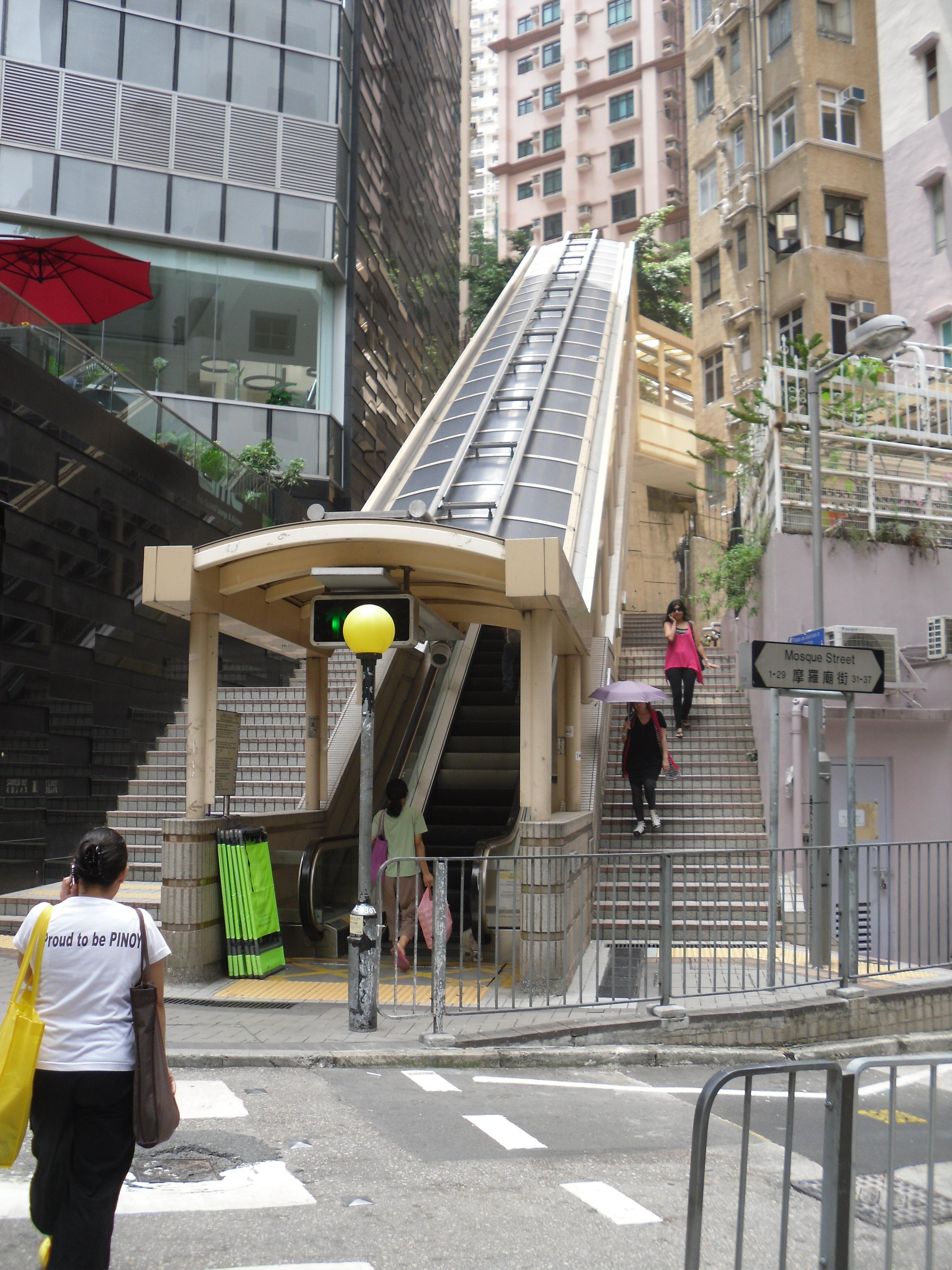
Mosque Street entrance

=== Daily patronage ===
The Transport Department conducted patronage surveys for the entire system in 2005 and 2010. In 2005, the system saw about 54,000 daily pedestrian trips. This grew to 85,000 trips in 2010. The department noted that the escalator has relieved demand for public transport, but has not led to many motorists giving up driving or reduced traffic congestion, in line with the traffic planning principle of induced demand.

Year	Daily usage
1996	34,000
2005	54,000
2010	85,000
2016	78,000

=== Management and maintenance ===
Management and maintenance of the system is the responsibility of the Electrical and Mechanical Services Department (EMSD). It is monitored during operating hours by staff in a control room near Caine Road. The system is equipped with 75 CCTV cameras, LED variable-message signage, and a public address system with about 200 speakers. Since 2014, EMSD has contracted out management and maintenance to a private company. As of 2014, the annual maintenance cost of the system is about HK$12.5 million.

The entire system is being refurbished in stages in a project expected to last from 2018 to 2022.

=== Tidal flow ===
The one-way escalators and moving walkways run downhill from 6 a.m. to 10 a.m. and then uphill from 10 a.m. to midnight daily. Users wanting to travel in the opposite direction must use the staircases and ramps along the escalator, which consists of total 782 steps between Conduit Road and Queen's Road Central footbridge. There is an entrance and exit on each road it passes, often on both sides of the road.

== Bisecting streets ==
The system runs through the whole length of Cochrane Street (named for Rear Admiral Thomas Alexander Cochrane) between Queen's Road Central and Hollywood Road. Then it runs along the entire length of a ladder street, Shelley Street.

The whole system bisects the following streets/roads:

- Queen Victoria Street (域多利皇后街)
- Des Voeux Road Central (德輔道中)
- Queen's Road Central (皇后大道中)
- Stanley Street (士丹利街)
- Wellington Street (威靈頓街)
- Gage Street (結志街)
- Lyndhurst Terrace (擺花街)
- Old Bailey Street (奧卑利街)
- Hollywood Road (荷里活道)
- Staunton Street (士丹頓街) – SoHo area
- Elgin Street (伊利近街)
- Caine Road (堅道)
- Mosque Street (摩羅廟街)
- Mosque Junction (摩羅廟交加街)
- Robinson Road (羅便臣道)
- Conduit Road (干德道)

== As film location ==
The Central–Mid-Levels escalators have been used as filming locations for several films, including:

- Chungking Express (1994). Director Wong Kar-wai stated: "That interests me because no one has made a movie there. When we were scouting for locations we found the light there entirely appropriate."
- Chinese Box (1997). Set in the months immediately preceding the 1997 handover of Hong Kong, the flat-cum-office of the main character John (Jeremy Irons) is located directly at the Central–Mid-Levels escalators.
- The Batman film The Dark Knight (2008). Filming took place there 6–11 November 2007.

== See also ==
- Centre Street escalator link
- List of streets and roads in Hong Kong
- Transport in Hong Kong
