= Staunton Street =

Street in Central, Hong Kong

Coordinates: 22.28150°N 114.15336°E

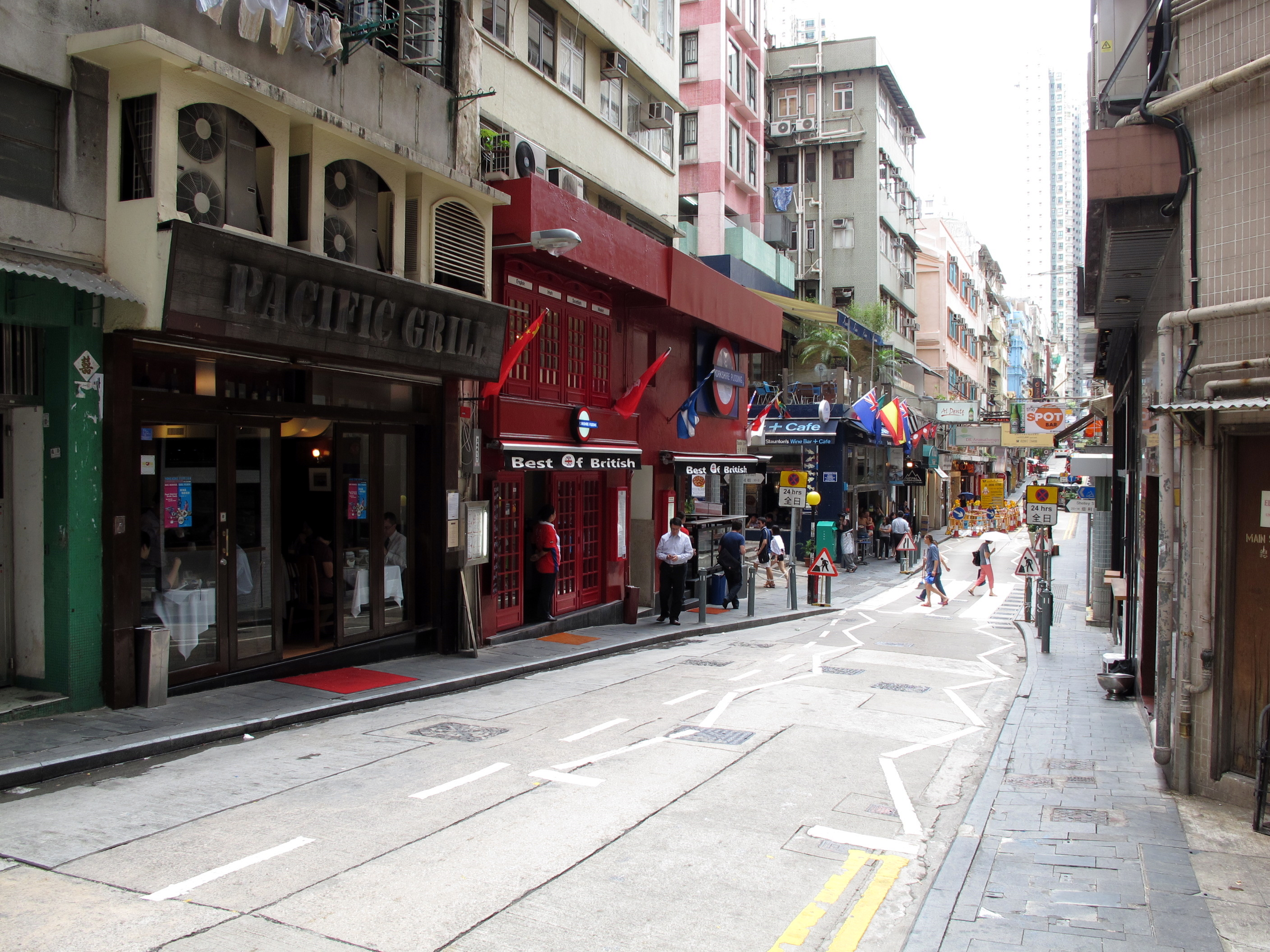
Bars and restaurants on Staunton Street.

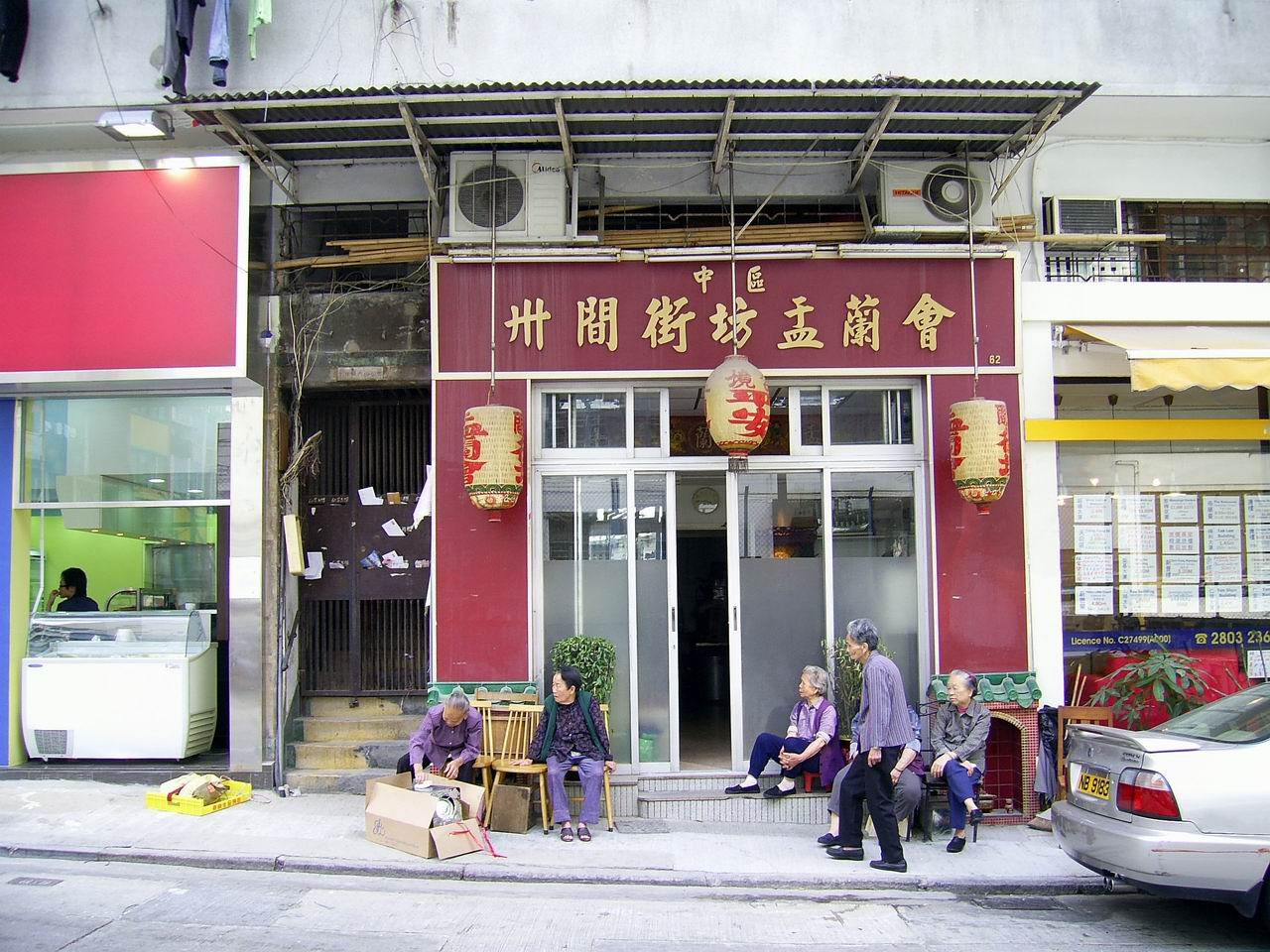
Association for the "Thirty Houses" Ghost Festival

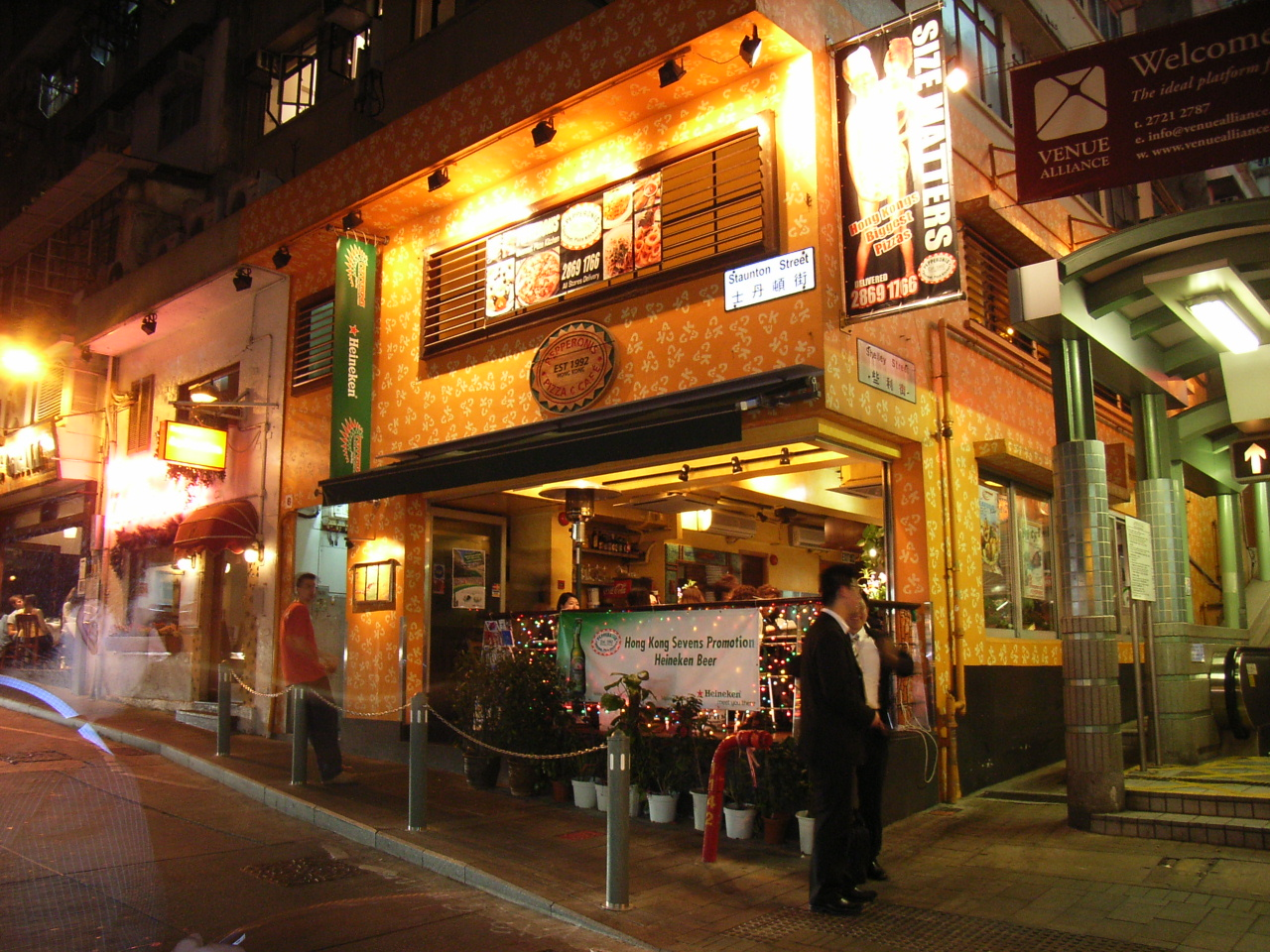
The street at night

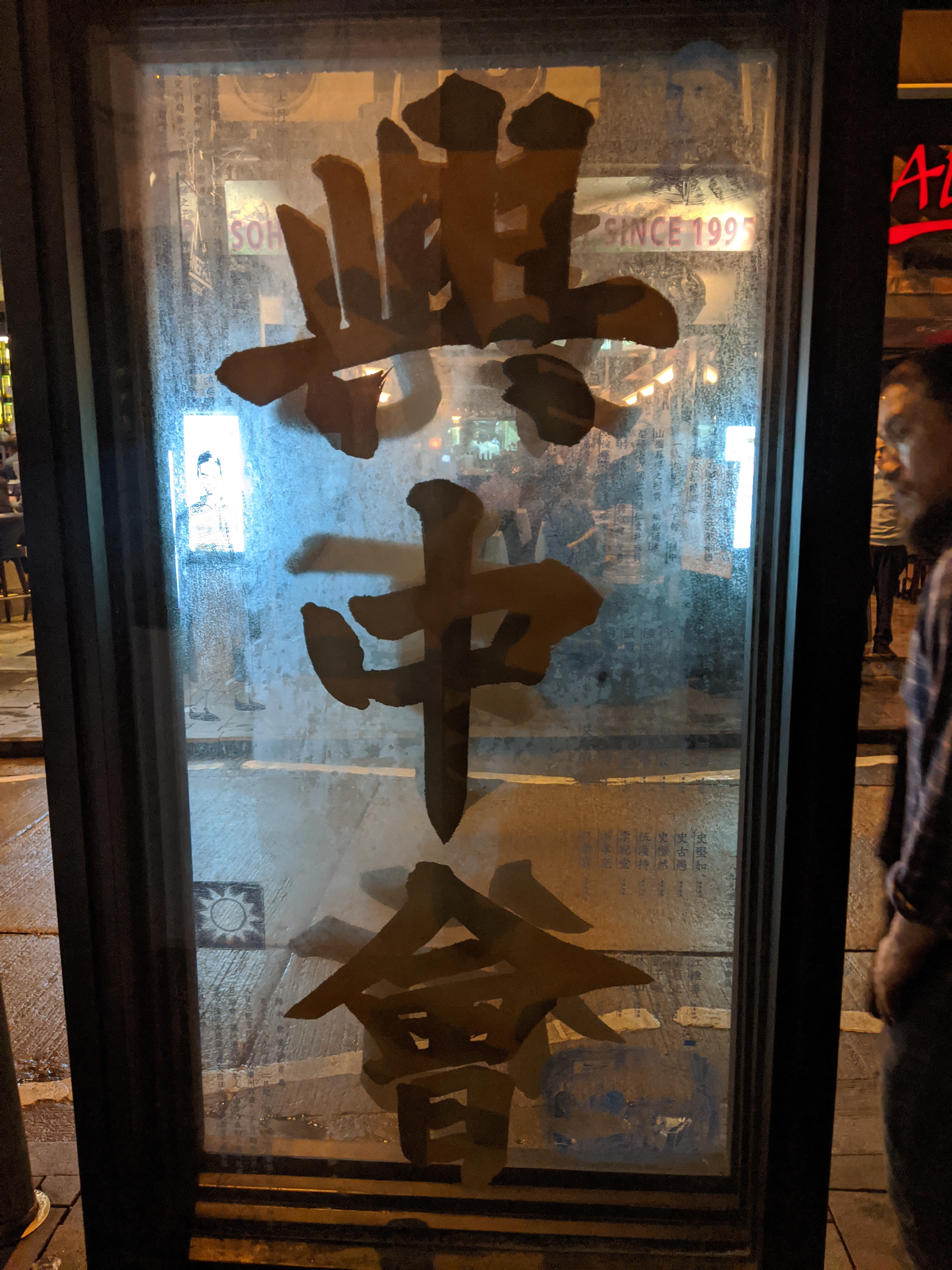
Marker in front of 13 Staunton Street

Staunton Street (Chinese: 士丹頓街; Jyutping: si6 daan1 deon6 gaai1) is a street in Central and Sheung Wan, on Hong Kong Island, Hong Kong. Together with the upper section of Elgin Street, it is the heart of the Soho entertainment area, featuring a number of restaurants, bars and shops. It was named after George Thomas Staunton.

== Location ==
The street runs on the contour of a hill, and is bounded by Shing Wong Street and Old Bailey Street. It crosses or has junctions with Shelley Street, Graham Street, Peel Street, Elgin Street and Aberdeen Street. Aberdeen Street marks the border between Sheung Wan and Central.

== History ==
The street is also known as Sam Sap Kan (卅間), as there were thirty houses on the street in the early days. It is famous for the tradition of Ghost Festival.

The Central–Mid-Levels escalators system bisects Staunton Street. Its opening in 1994 brought rapid change to the street and its life. Upmarket restaurants and bars opened, catering to the stream of middle class professionals heading home from Central.

No. 13 Staunton Street is the site of the former "Kuen Hang Club", the clandestine headquarters of the revolutionary Revive China Society of Sun Yat-sen. There is a marker in front of the building, denoting its place in the Dr. Sun Yat Sen Historical Trail.

== See also ==
- List of streets and roads in Hong Kong
