= Mosque Street, Hong Kong =

Street on Hong Kong Island, Hong Kong

Mosque Street
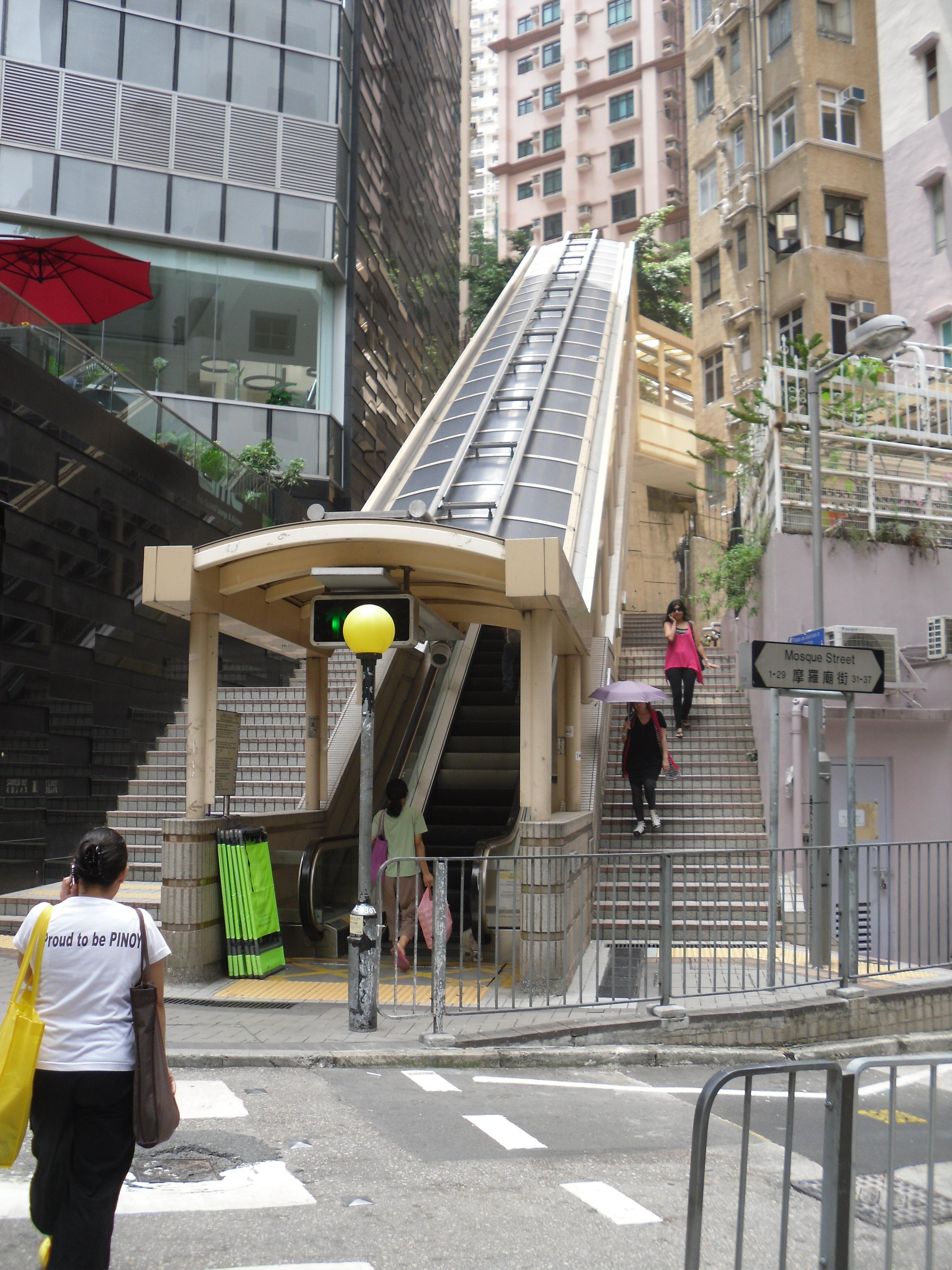
- Central–Mid-Levels escalator at Mosque Street
- Interactive map of Mosque Street
- Native name: 摩羅廟街 (Yue Chinese)
- Length: 0.2 km (0.12 mi)
- Location: Hong Kong
- Coordinates: 22.279876243231094°N 114.15184332060859°E

Mosque Street, Hong Kong
- Traditional Chinese: 摩羅廟街
Transcriptions
Standard Mandarin
- Hanyu Pinyin: Mōluómiào jiē
Yue: Cantonese
- Jyutping: mo1 lo4 miu3 gai1

Mosque Street (Chinese: 摩羅廟街; Jyutping: mo1 lo4 miu6 gaai1) is a street in the Mid-levels of Hong Kong, belonging to the Central and Western District. It is named after the historic Jamia Mosque nearby. The Central–Mid-Levels escalator intersects this road and Mosque Junction as it passes the mosque.

== Intersecting streets ==
- Peel Street
- Central–Mid-Levels escalator
- Robinson Road

== See also ==
- List of streets and roads in Hong Kong
