= Elgin Street, Hong Kong =

Street in Central, Hong Kong

Coordinates: 22.28198°N 114.15236°E

Elgin Street
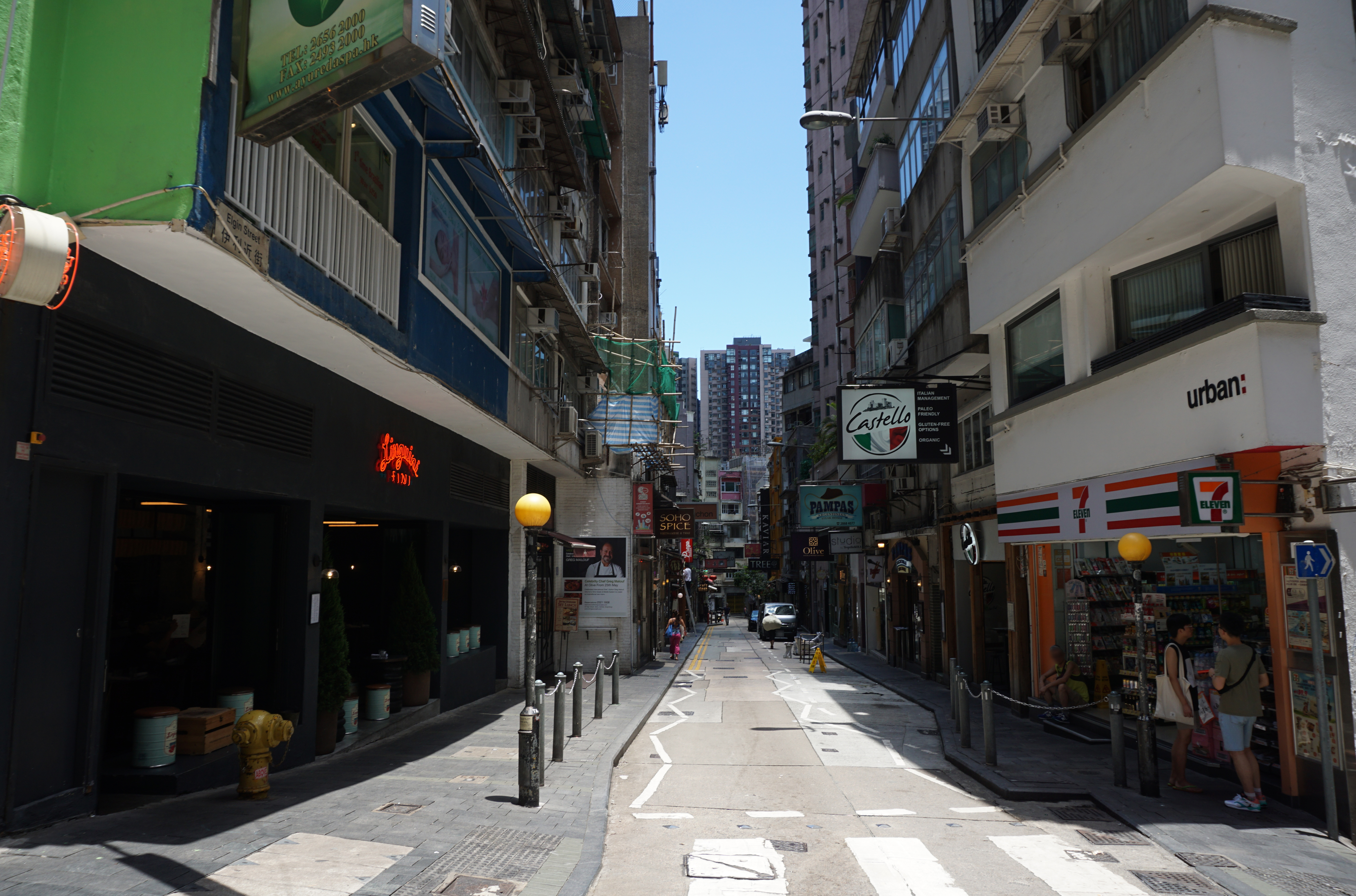
- Elgin Street in 2016
- Traditional Chinese: 伊利近街
Transcriptions
Standard Mandarin
- Hanyu Pinyin: Yīlìjìn Jiē
Yue: Cantonese
- Yale Romanization: yi1 lei6 gan6 gaai1

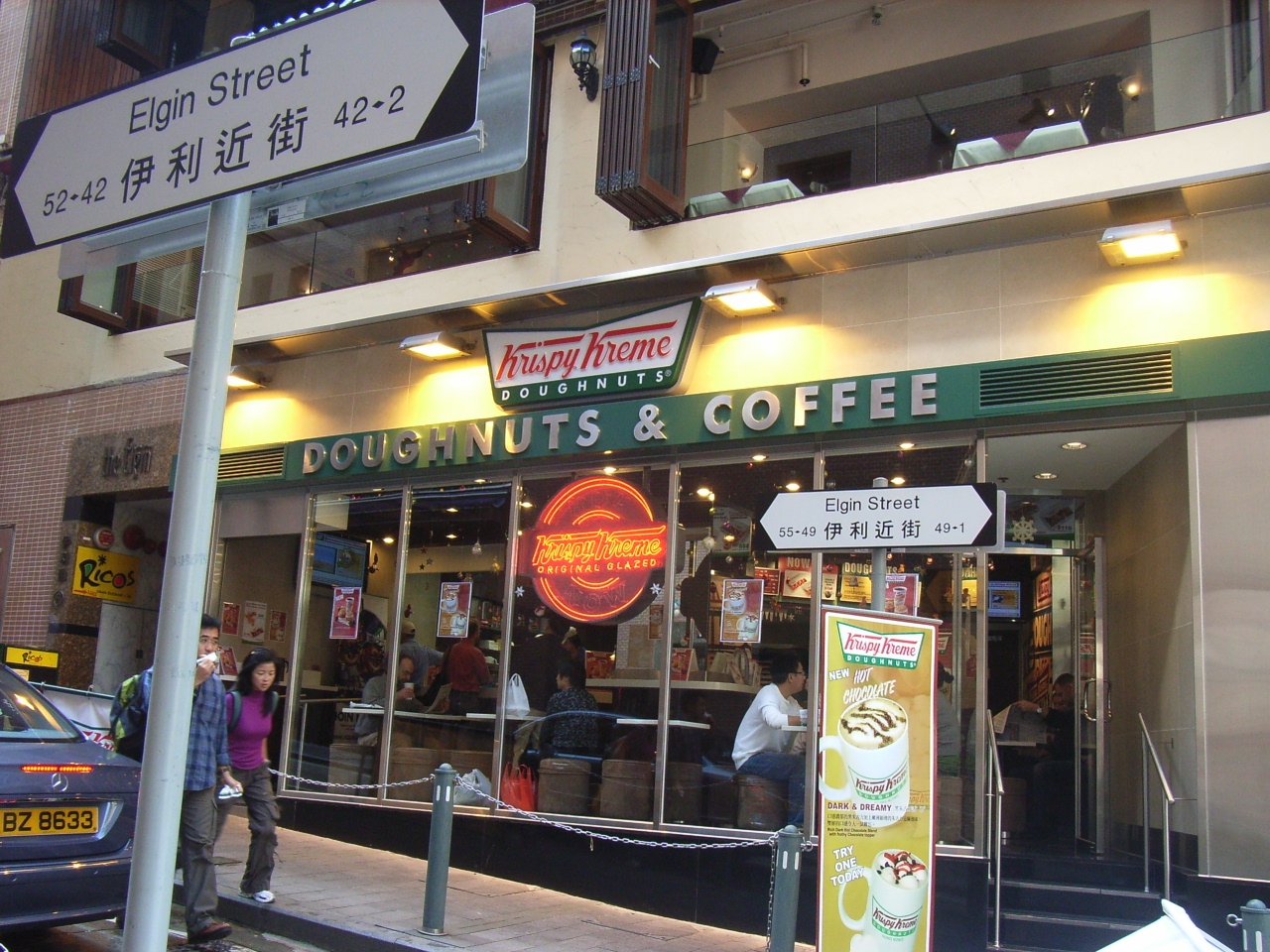
A Krispy Kreme café on the street

Elgin Street is located in Central, Hong Kong. It is named after James Bruce, 8th Earl of Elgin, and is one of the oldest streets in Hong Kong.

== Location ==
The street is divided into two sections: the first begins at the junction with Hollywood Road, and climbs up to the junction of Staunton Street with Peel Street. The second section of Elgin Street starts at the junction with Peel Street (specifically: directly opposite Nos. 65 & 65A). From there it ascends in a southwesterly direction – where it is intersected by the Central–Mid-Levels Escalators on Shelley Street – to its southern tip at Caine Road. The upper section of the street is less steep than the lower one.

== Features ==
Originally there were two dai pai dongs operating on the street near Hollywood Road, but one of them was forced to closed in 2005. The lower section of Elgin Street is lined with stallholders, many of whom display their wares on the ground. The upper section is lined with international restaurants; a comedy club was formerly located at No. 34.

== Gallery ==
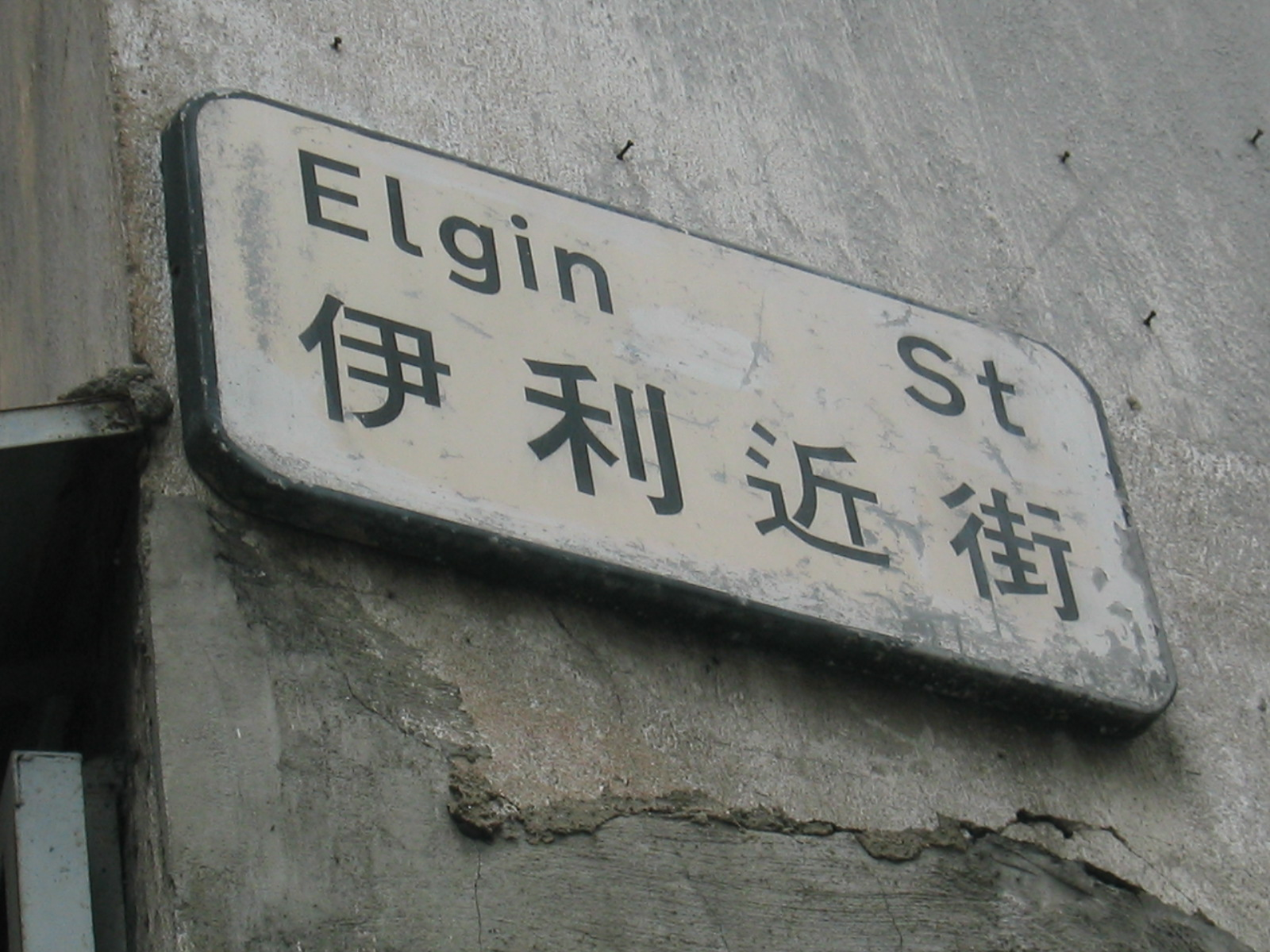
Weathered vintage street nameplate

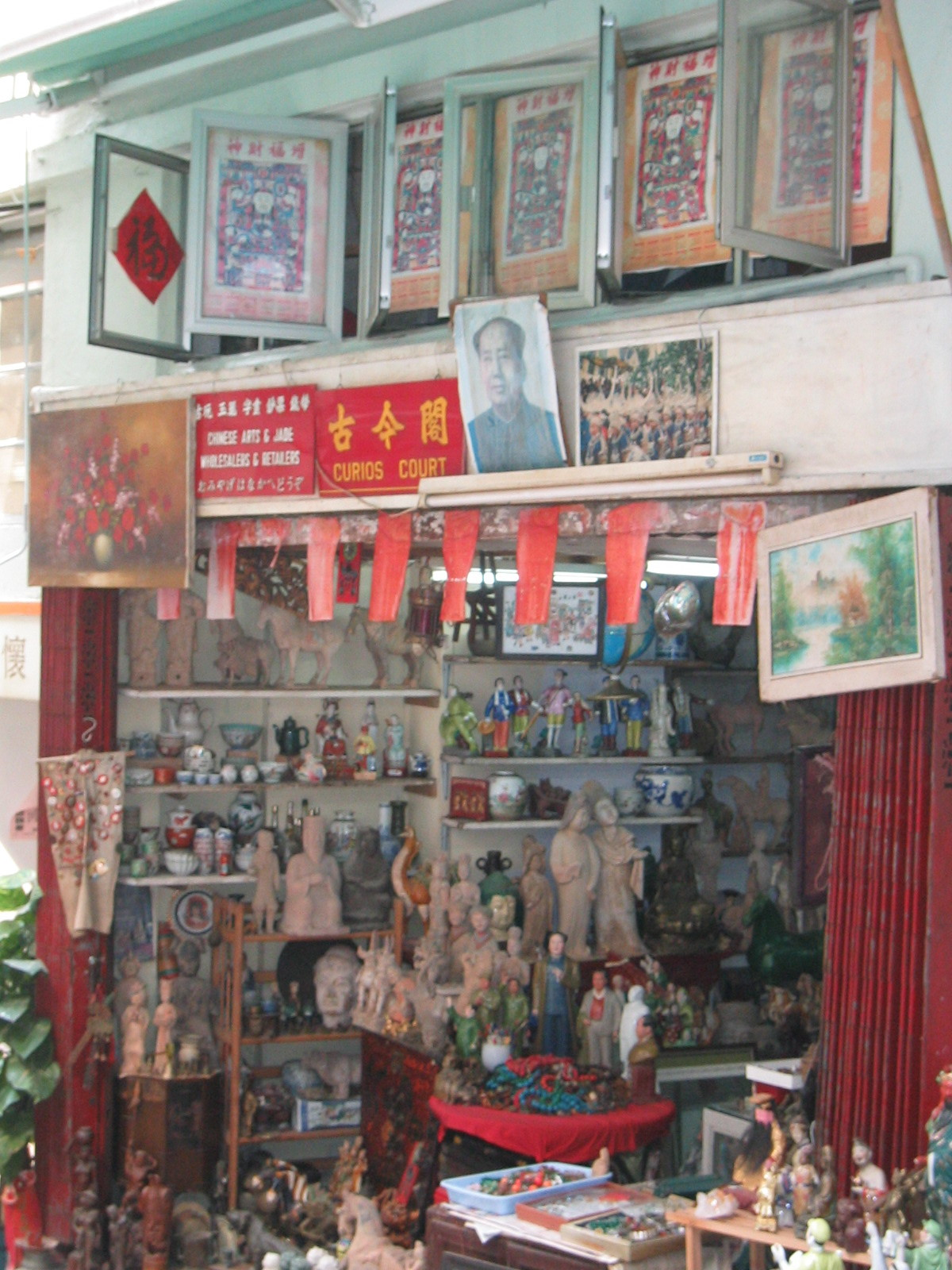
An antique shop on the street

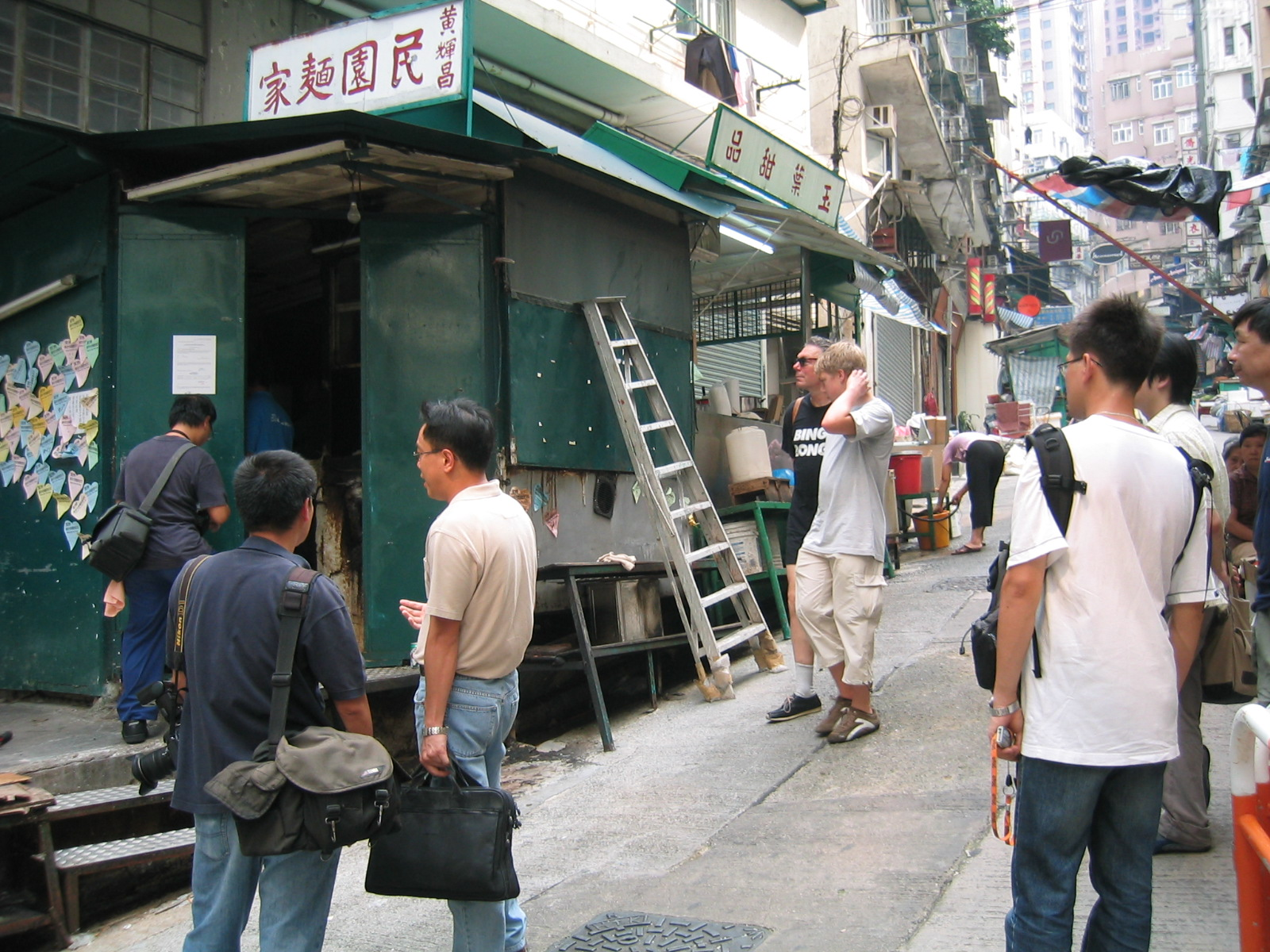
The closed and the still-operating dai pai dongs on the street in 2005

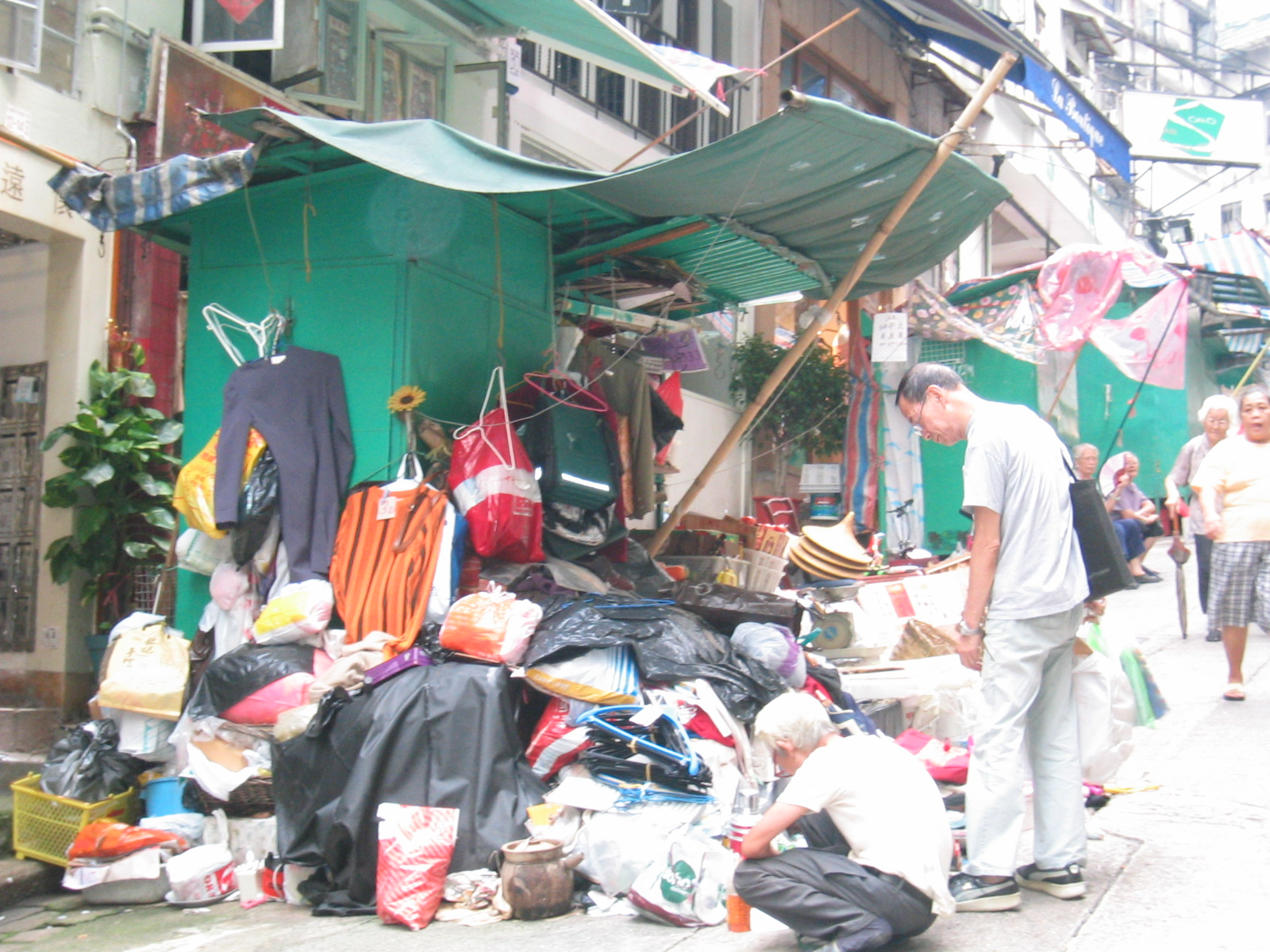
A stall selling miscellaneous goods on the street in 2005

== See also ==
- List of streets and roads in Hong Kong
- SoHo, Hong Kong
