= Bakehouse (bakery) =

Bakery chain in Hong Kong

- Industry: Bakery, Food
- Founded: 2013
- Founder: Grégoire Michaud
- Headquarters: Hong Kong
- Number of locations: 8 (2025)
- Area served: Hong Kong
- Products: Egg tarts, croissants, doughnuts, cookies, sausage rolls, and scones
- Website: https://www.bakehouse.hk/

Bakehouse is a Swiss-founded bakery chain in Hong Kong. It was founded by Grégoire Michaud in 2013. It opened its first shop in Wan Chai in 2018 and as of 2025 has eight shops across Hong Kong. Bakehouse is best known for its egg tart, a traditional Chinese desert in Hong Kong, which had been readapted by the bakery. Bakehouse also serves pastry products such as croissants, doughnuts, cookies, sausage rolls, and scones.

== History ==
Bakehouse was founded by Swiss Chef Grégoire Michaud, the former executive chef at Four Seasons Hong Kong, in 2013. It started as a wholesale bakery supplying kitchens in Hong Kong.

In 2018, Bakehouse opened its first store in Wan Chai. It opened its second store in Soho in 2020. In 2022, Bakehouse opened three new stores in Tsim Sha Tsui, Stanley, and Causeway Bay respectively. In 2024, Bakehouse opened a new store in Tung Chung. In 2025, Bakehouse opened a new store in Sha Tin as a restaurant, as opposed to the previous stores serving only pastry products. In September, 2025, Bakehouse opened a new store in The Peak tower. All eight shops have been designed by Hong Kong based firm CRAFT Design.
