= Bakehouse (building) =

Building for baking bread

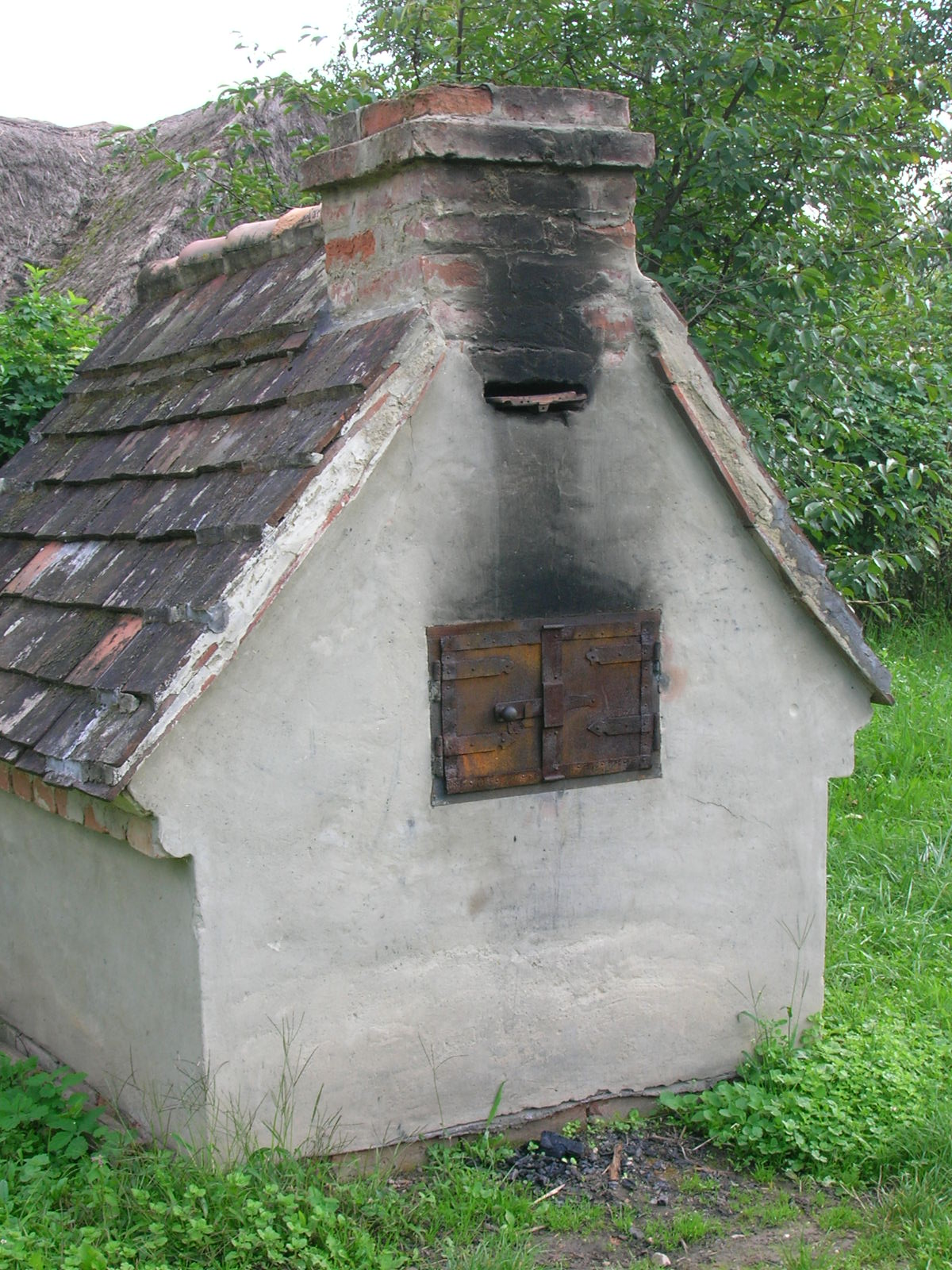
A village bakehouse, Göcsej, Hungary

A bakehouse is a building for baking bread. The term may be used interchangeably with the term "bakery", although the latter commonly includes both production and retail areas.

Designated bakehouses can be found in archaeological sites from ancient times, e.g., in Roman forts.

Historically there have been many types of bakehouses: individual, in the backyards of homesteads; communal, used by residents of a village or a town, and commercial.

Some of them used to be nothing but a huge oven, called oven-houses.

== Gallery ==
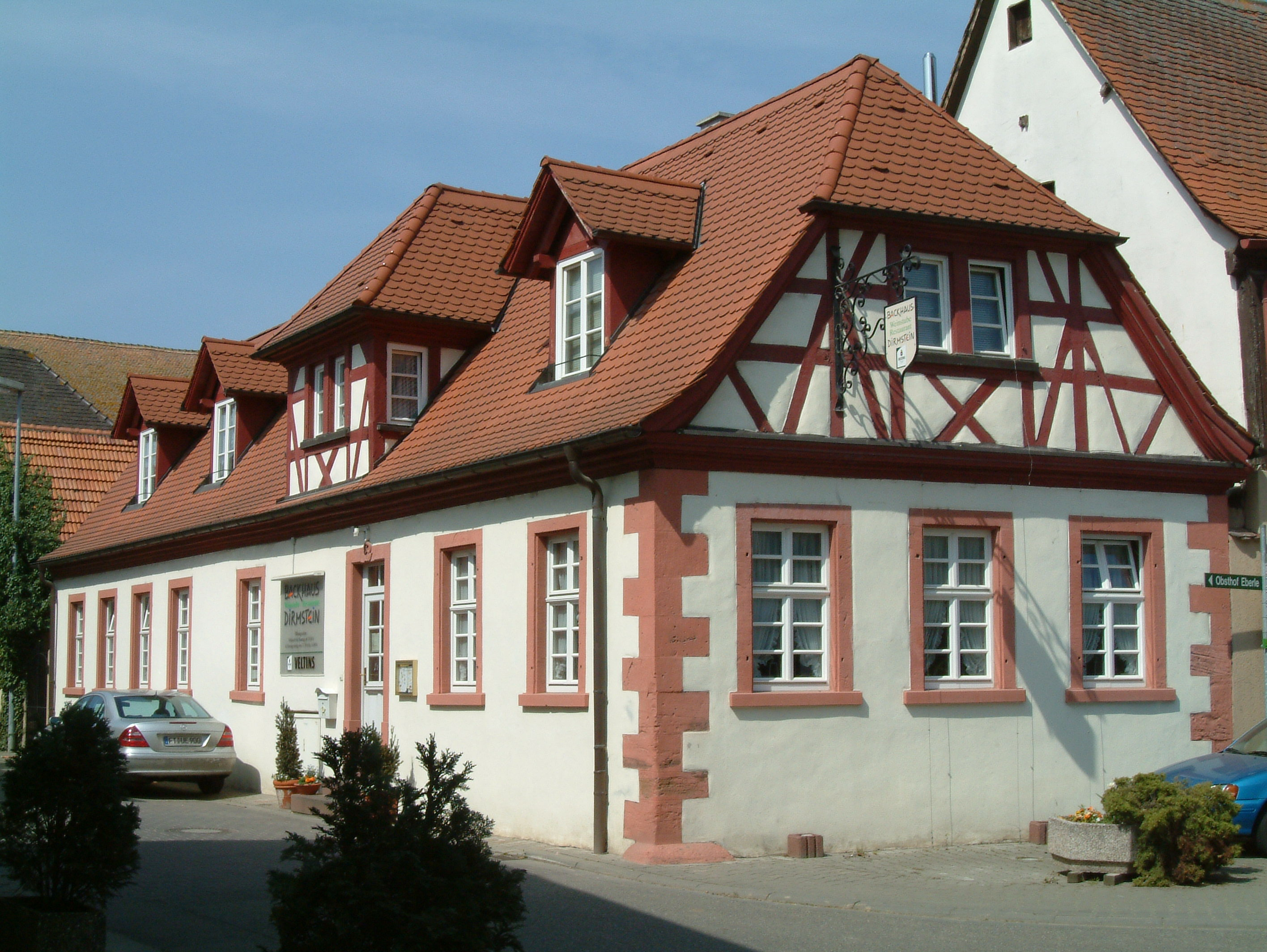
The Bakehouse (Dirmstein), Germany

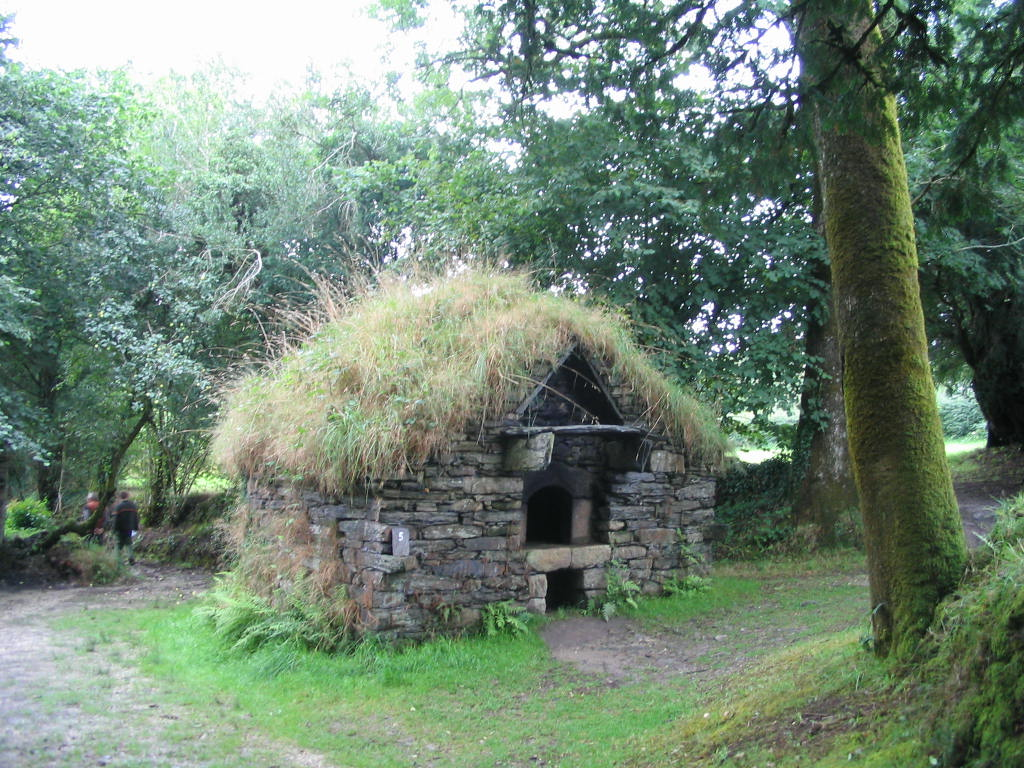
An oven-house (four a pain maison), Saint-Rivoal, France

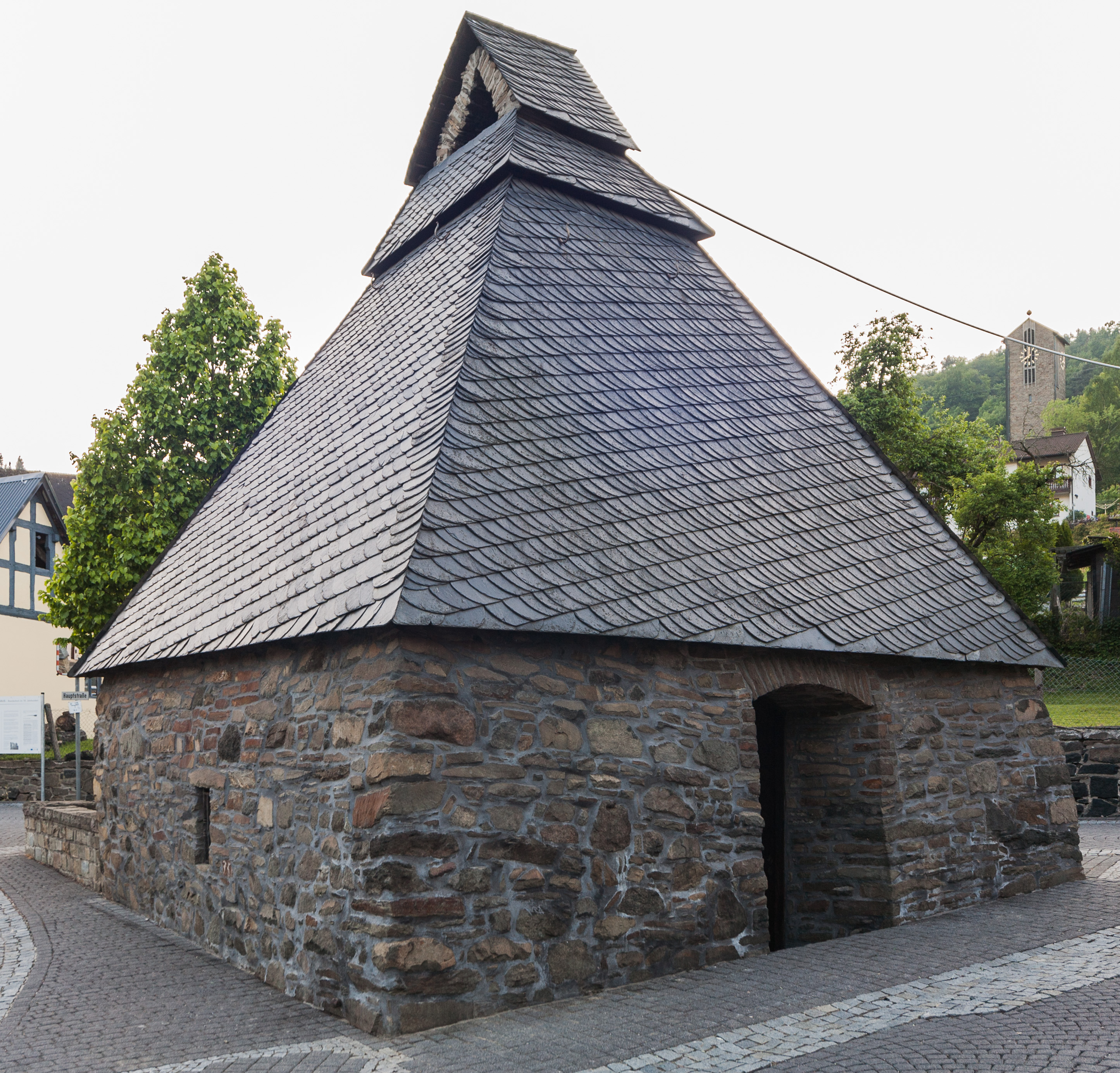
A town bakehouse, Gönnern, Germany

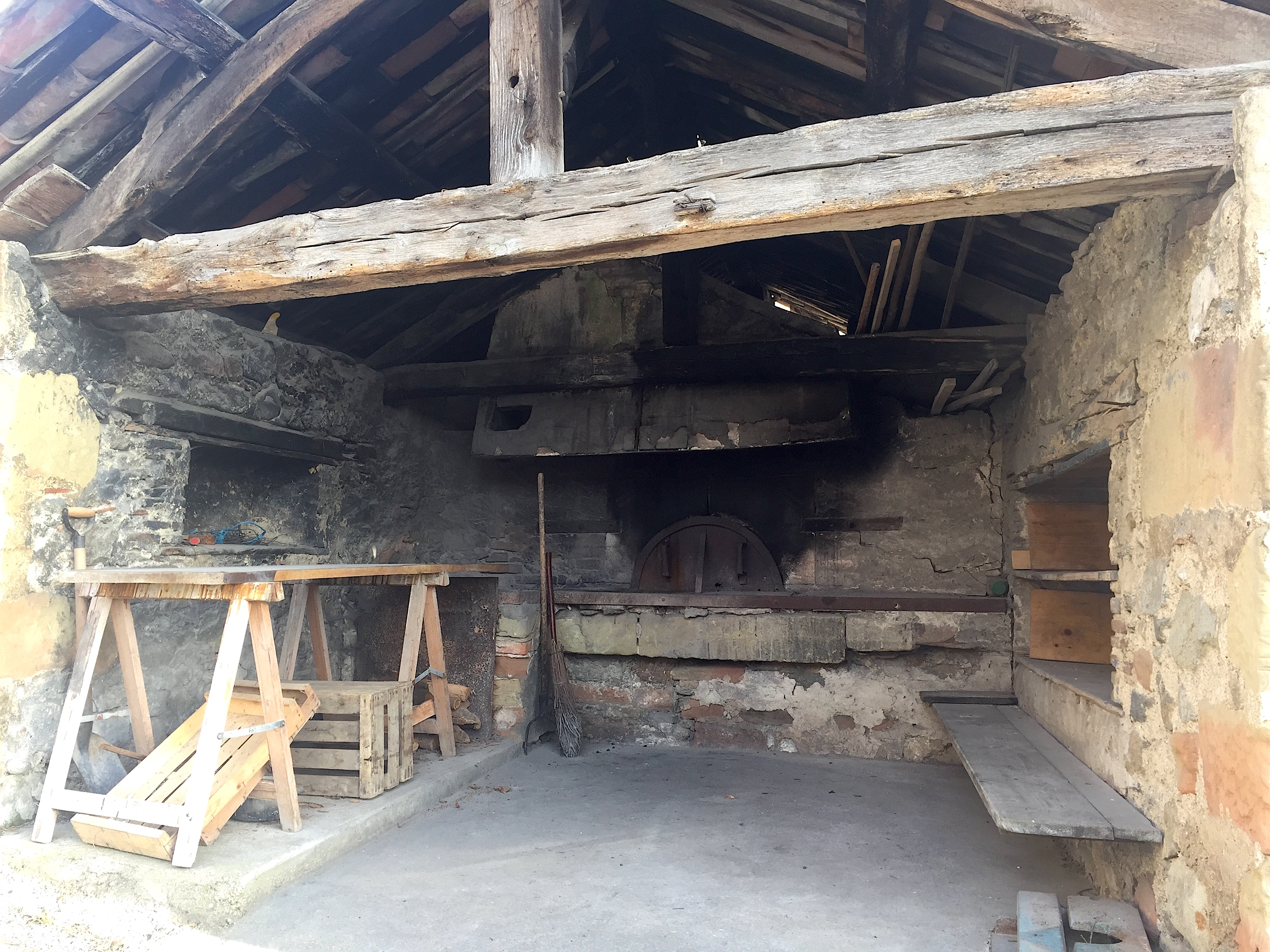
A village bakehouse, Saint-Nicolas-de-Macherin, France

== See also ==
- Tandoor
- Communal oven
