= Bakehouse (Dirmstein) =

Coordinates: 49°33′52″N 8°14′45″E

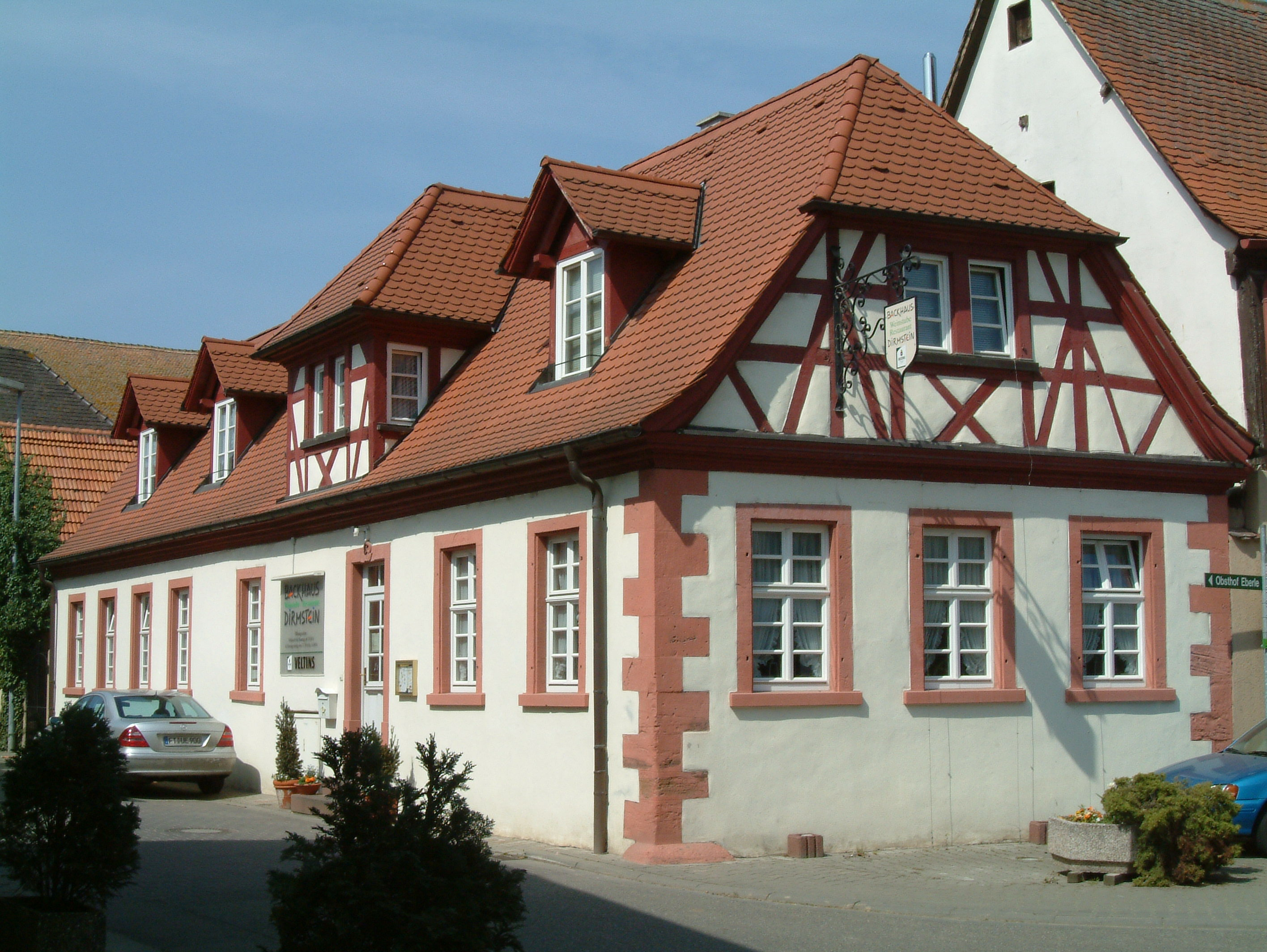
Dirmstein Bakehouse, 2006

The Bakehouse (German: Backhaus) is a historical bakehouse in Dirmstein, Rhineland-Palatinate, Germany, designated as an item of the cultural heritage.

In late 1990s, this 300-year building was acquired, restored, and expanded by a France-born couple François and Marie-Colette Sagnier.
