= Sōgen =

- Gender: Male

Origin
- Origin: Japanese
- Meaning: Different meanings depending on the kanji used

Sōgen, Sogen or Sougen (written: 宗現, 宗源 or 曹玄) is a masculine Japanese given name. Notable people with the name include:

- Sōgen Asahina (朝比奈 宗源; 1891–1979), Japanese Zen Buddhist
- Sogen Kato (加藤 宗現; 1899 – c. 1978)
- Omori Sogen (大森 曹玄; 1904–1994), Japanese Zen Buddhist
