= Robinson Road, Hong Kong =

Road in Hong Kong

Robinson Road
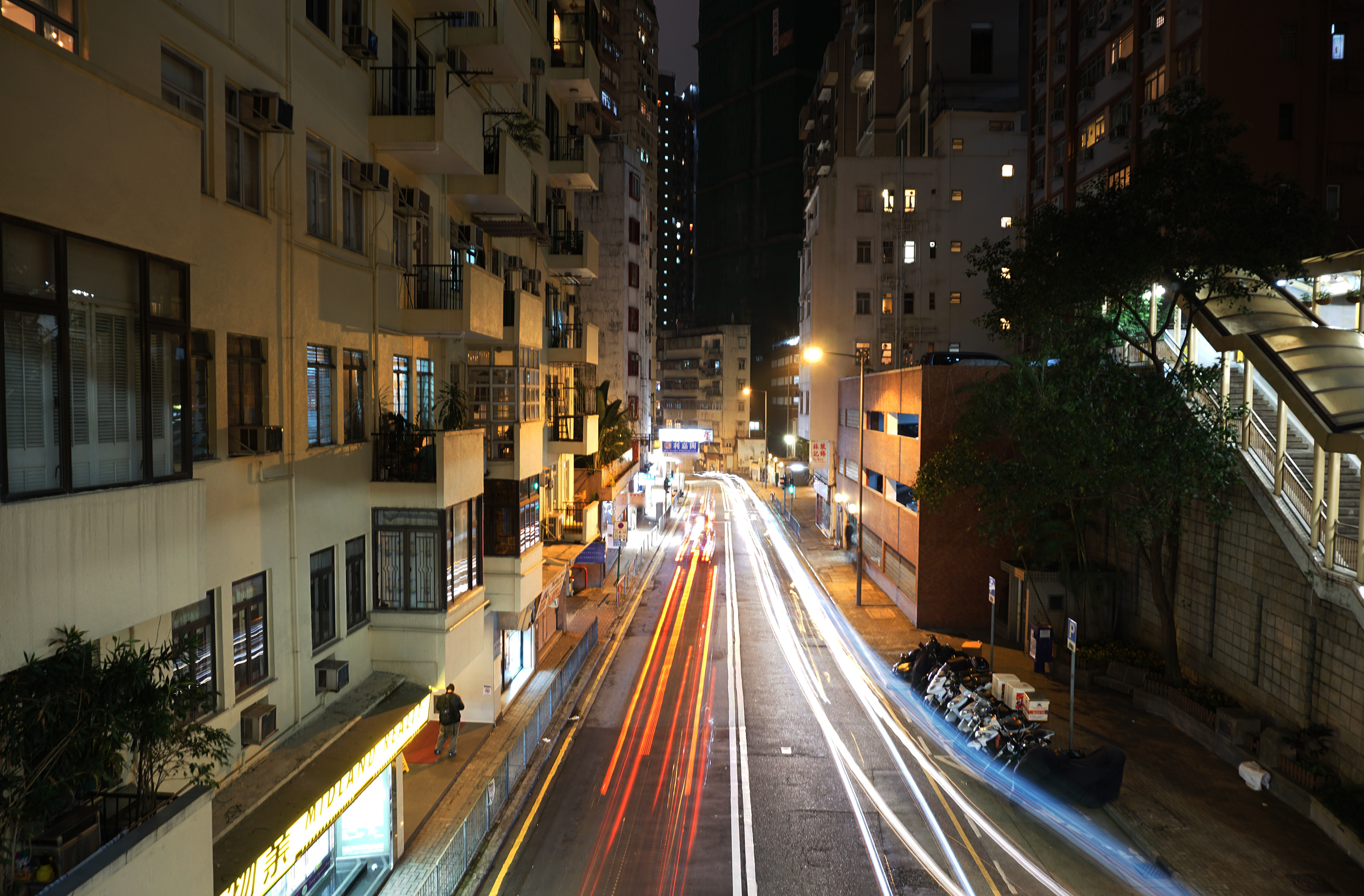
- Robinson Road at night
- Interactive map of Robinson Road
- Namesake: Sir Hercules Robinson
- Length: 1.5 km (0.93 mi)
- Nearest metro station: Central
- Coordinates: 22°16′58″N 114°08′46″E

Robinson Road
- Traditional Chinese: 羅便臣道
- Simplified Chinese: 罗便臣道
Transcriptions
Standard Mandarin
- Hanyu Pinyin: Luóbiànchén Dào
Yue: Cantonese
- Yale Romanization: lo4 bin6 san4 dou6

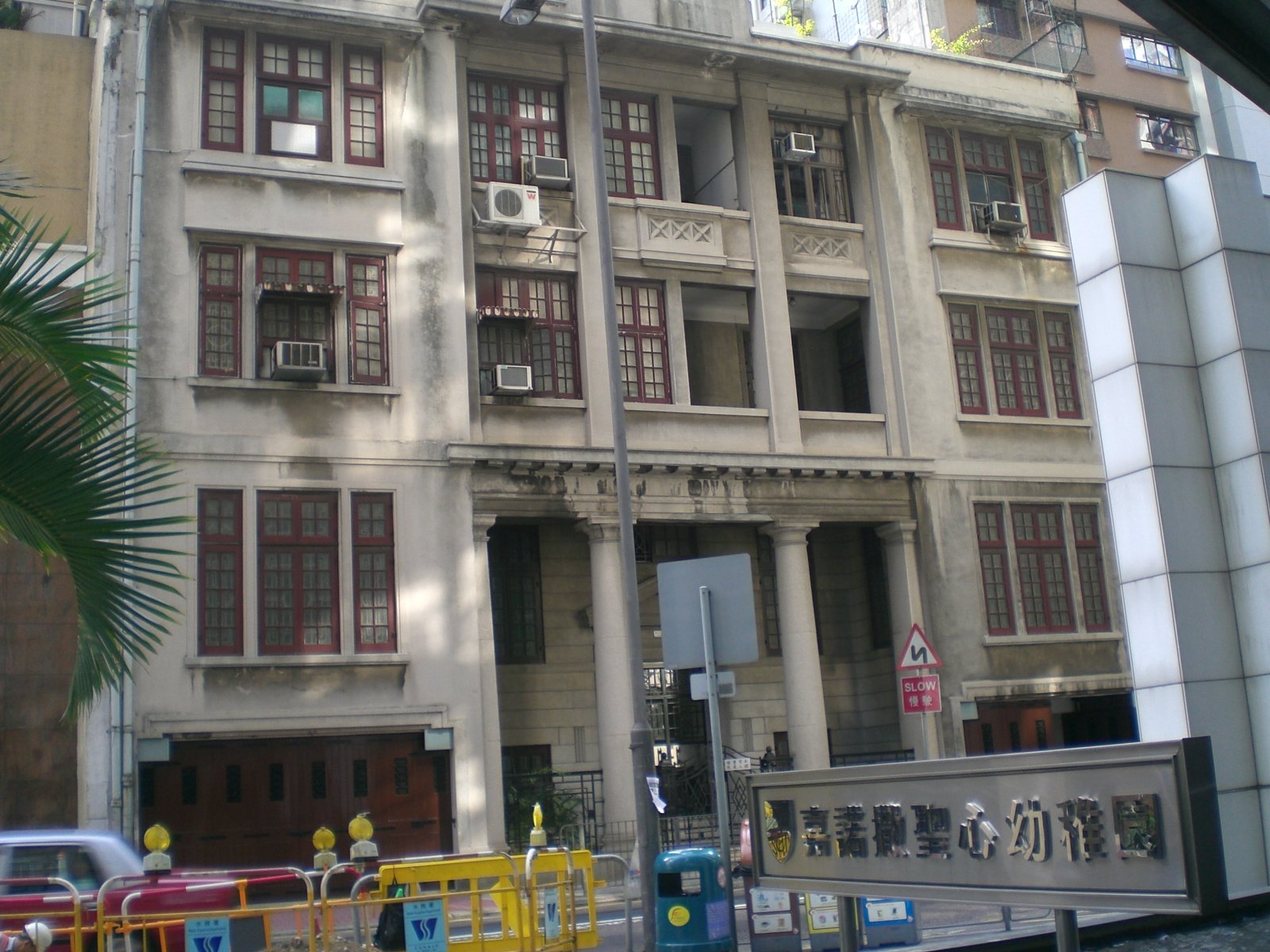
No. 15 Robinson Road, a Grade II historic building.

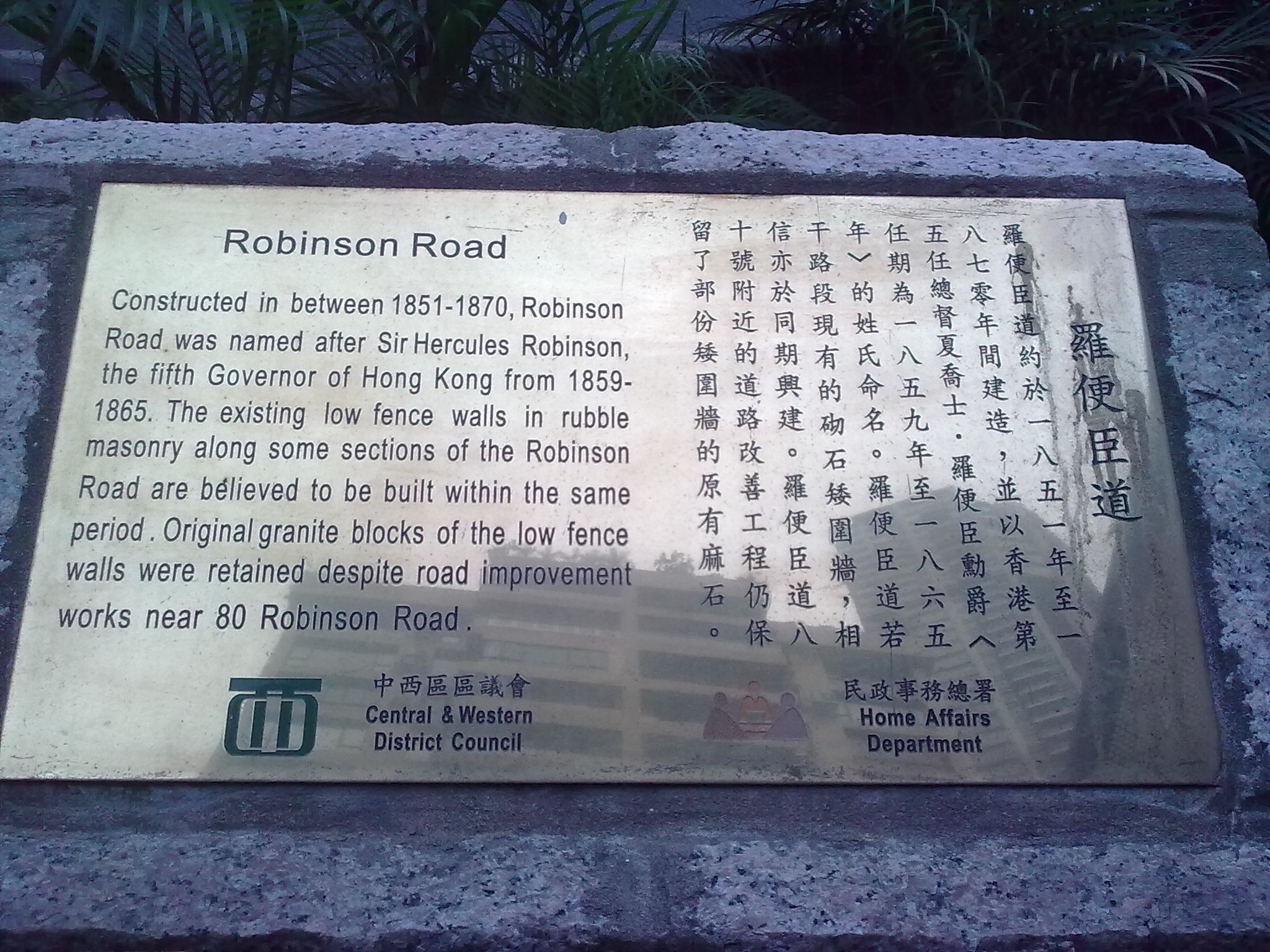
Robinson Road plaque.

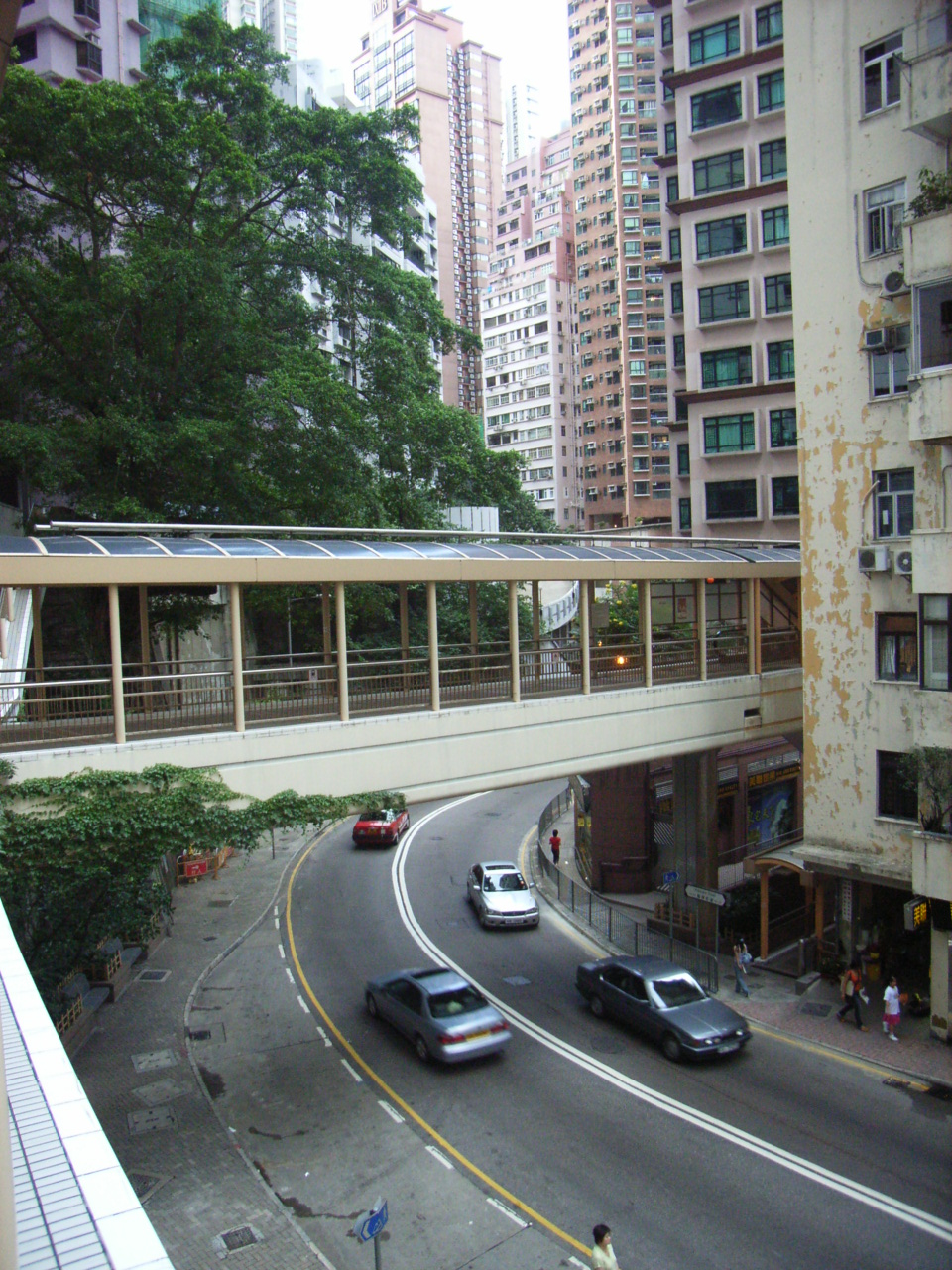
The Central–Mid-Levels escalator crossing above Robinson Road.

Robinson Road (Chinese: 羅便臣道; Jyutping: lo4 bin6 san4 dou6) is a thoroughfare located in Mid-Levels, Hong Kong Island, Hong Kong. To the east, it intersects with Magazine Gap Road and Garden Road, while to the west, it connects with Babington Path and Park Road.

== Naming ==
Robinson Road was named after the fifth governor of Hong Kong, Sir Hercules Robinson.

In Kowloon, Nathan Road was also initially referred to as Robinson Road until 1907. The road was later renamed to alleviate confusion with its counterpart in the Mid-Levels.

== History ==
As early as the 1870s, Robinson Road had an enviable reputation, serving as the residence for the European upper-middle class of its time. The area remains one of the most affluent in Hong Kong.

== Features ==
Robinson Road is primarily residential and, in line with the area, is bordered by high-rises. There are several property agents situated along the road.

An escalator connecting the Central to Mid-Levels districts passes between Mosque Street and Conduit Road, while Robinson Road runs parallel below.

The historic Ohel Leah Synagogue is situated on the northern side of the western end of the street.

== Notable residents ==
Notable residents include actor/singer/entrepreneur Edison Chen and actress Bernice Liu.

== Wall trees ==
Some of Hong Kong's 1,000 "wall trees" can be found on Robinson Road by the Mid-Levels escalator.

Parts of the walls in Robinson Road have been recently declared protected monuments.

== See also ==
- List of streets and roads in Hong Kong
- Ying Wa Girls' School
