= SoHo, Hong Kong =

Area in Hong Kong

Coordinates: 22°16′56″N 114°9′10″E

- Traditional Chinese: 蘇豪
- Simplified Chinese: 苏豪
- Cantonese Yale: Sōuhòuh
Transcriptions
Standard Mandarin
- Hanyu Pinyin: Sūháo
- Wade–Giles: Su^{1}-hao^{2}
- IPA: [sú.xǎʊ]
Yue: Cantonese
- Yale Romanization: Sōuhòuh
- Jyutping: sou1 hou4
- IPA: [sɔw˥.hɔw˩]

Alternative Chinese name
- Chinese: 荷南
- Cantonese Yale: Hòhnàahm
Transcriptions
Standard Mandarin
- Hanyu Pinyin: Hénán
- Wade–Giles: Ho^{2}-nan^{2}
- IPA: [xɤ̌.nǎn]
Yue: Cantonese
- Yale Romanization: Hòhnàahm
- Jyutping: ho4 naam4
- IPA: [hɔ˩.nam˩]

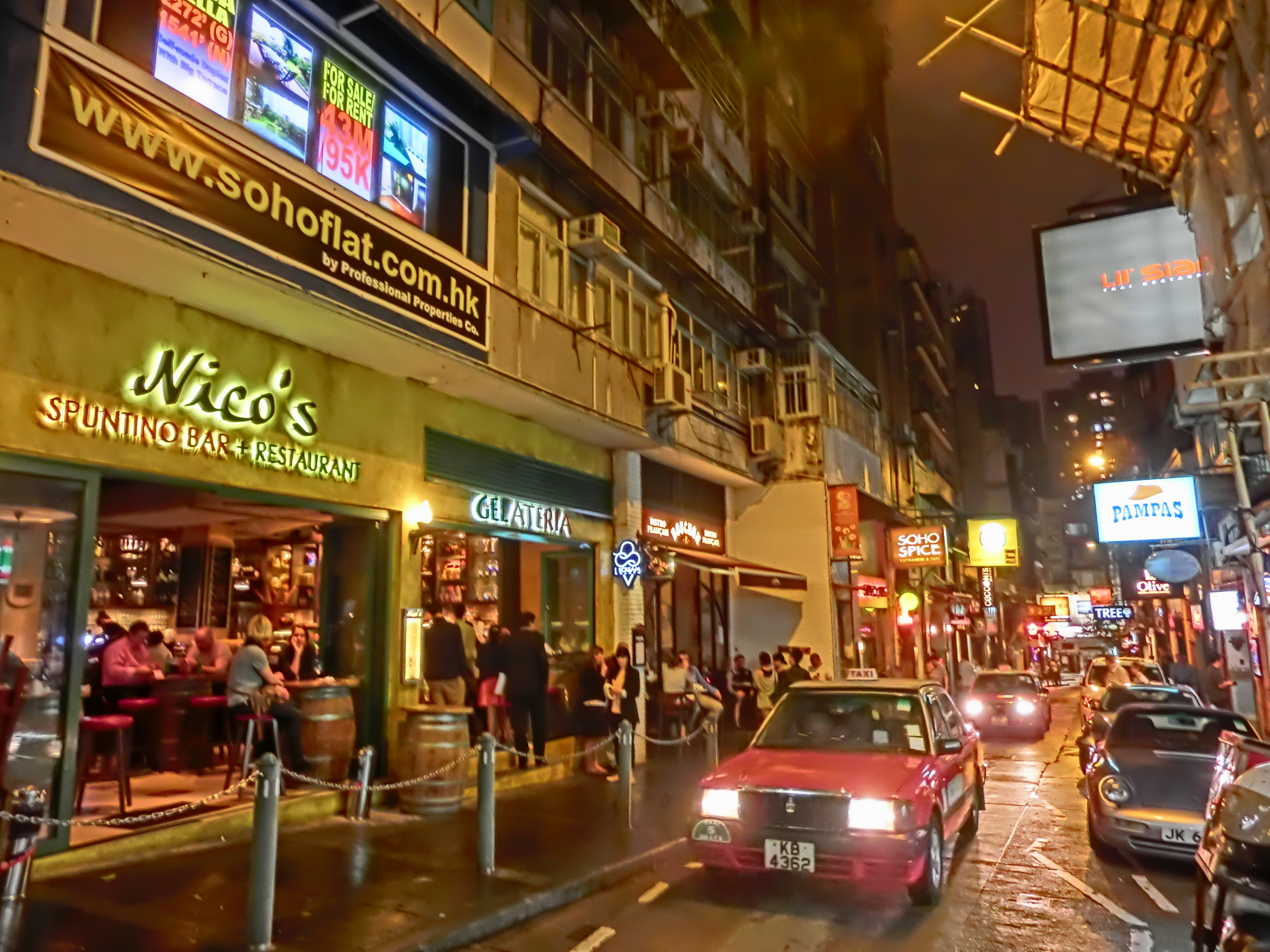
Elgin Street in SoHo in April 2013

SoHo (Chinese: 蘇豪; also 荷南 and 荷南美食區; formally 中環蘇豪區) is an area of Hong Kong located on the western edge of Central, bordering Sheung Wan, known for its bars, restaurants and entertainment venues. The name is derived from its location: South of Hollywood Road.

== History ==
The Central–Mid-Levels escalator was built in 1993; the now vibrant character of SoHo is attributed to the creation of the escalator system, which at the time was the longest escalator system in the world. Prior to the escalator construction, the area was populated by many elderly locals, old go-downs and porcelain shops.

The area now consists of restaurants, bars, nightclubs, art galleries and antique stores of Staunton Street and Elgin Street. SoHo also is home to the first full-time comedy club in Asia, The TakeOut Comedy Club Hong Kong. Hong Kong taxi drivers usually regard "SoHo" to mean either Staunton Street or Elgin Street.

Buildings in the SoHo area are a mix of commercial/residential, with the commercial businesses on the lower floors, and residential above the First Floors. Around the same time the Mid-Levels Escalator was built, a few foreigners started to move into the area, taking up both commercial premises and renting flats. At the time the flats were cheaper than other expat areas in Hong Kong, and only a few minutes' walk from the business district.

The name SoHo was first mentioned in a 1996 article in the South China Morning Post newspaper attributed to Elgin Street restaurant owner Thomas Goetz, who came up with the acronym. Goetz was also instrumental in forming SoHo's first business group, and The SoHo Association Limited (TSAL) was established in 1998 to represent its members in relation to difficulties they were experiencing with the local government departments in relation to licensing, and to collectively promote the area. The first Chairman was Jean-Paul Gauci, who had opened many businesses in the area.

However, in 2000, Democratic Party member Kam Nai-wai wanted to see SoHo formally renamed the "Elgin/Staunton Street Themed Dining Area", and Kam and some long-term residents associated the name SoHo with being a place of disrepute, with red light district associations. The irony is Elgin Street was known in the 1860s as "Hung Mo Giu Gai," or "Foreign Girls Street," due to the vast number of European-staffed brothels. It was renamed after Lord Elgin, British envoy to China, during the Second Opium War (1857–1860). For several years the Democratic Party fought an ongoing battle against the new bars and restaurants in the area, and also against formal adoption of the name "SoHo", preferring instead the descriptive "Staunton/Elgin Street Themed Dining Area" so as not to associate the area with alcohol consumption. The name "SoHo" could also cause association with the London area of the same name.

Like much of Hong Kong, this district treads a precarious balance between preserving the Chinese and colonial culture that shaped it, and recent modern developments. The escalator is a quintessential symbol of modernity which has encroached on the residential neighbourhood, bringing with it expats and the bars, cafes and boutiques which help cocoon some from Cantonese traditions.

The contrast between the past and present enriches the area and makes for great sightseeing on foot. The newly signposted Sun Yat-sen Historical Trail guides visitors along 16 points of historical interest from The University of Hong Kong to Central, taking in century old steps and leafy residential lanes. Unfortunately, most of the sites from Dr Sun's past have long been razed, replaced by concrete skyscrapers that are characteristic of 21st century Hong Kong. Even the Dr. Sun Yat-sen Museum's grandiose facade off Caine Road is easy to miss, perched as it is upon Castle Road which turns up through Mid-Levels, surrounded by modern blocks.

Nowhere is the contrast more apparent than on the northern edge of SoHo, on Hollywood Road itself where the brand new multistorey Centre Stage upscale residential complex towers alongside the historic Man Mo Temple.

== See also ==
- List of places in Hong Kong
- Tourism in Hong Kong
- Mid-Levels
- Old Bailey Street
