= Gutzlaff Street =

Street in Central, Hong Kong

Coordinates: 22.28302°N 114.15388°E

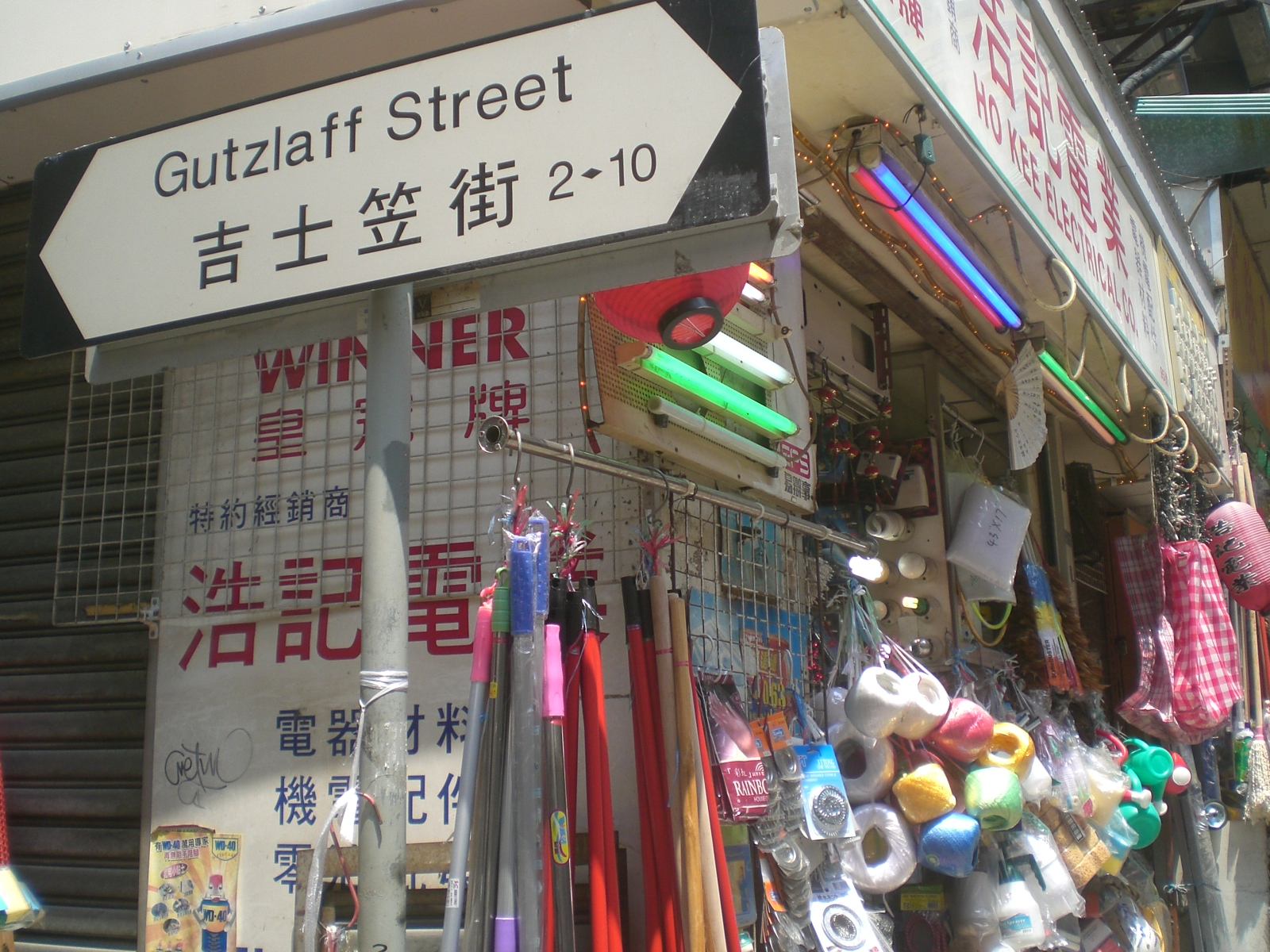
- Gutzlaff Street, as seen from the corner of Wellington Street
- Traditional Chinese: 吉士笠街
Transcriptions
Yue: Cantonese
- Yale Romanization: gat1 si6 lap1 gaai1

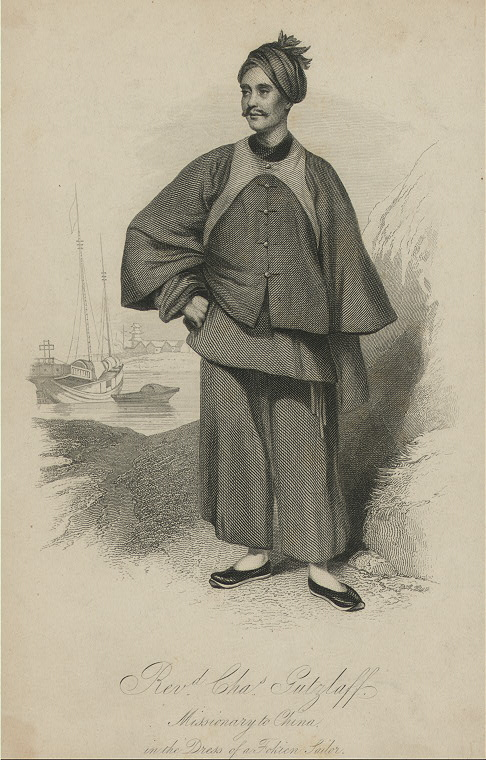
Karl Gützlaff, in Fujian costume

Gutzlaff Street (Chinese: 吉士笠街) is an alley in the Central district of Hong Kong, crossing Stanley Street, Wellington Street, Gage Street, and Lyndhurst Terrace. Owing to its narrow width, it is cut off from vehicular access, and can only be traversed on foot.

== Etymology ==
One of the oldest streets in Hong Kong, it is named after the 19th-century Prussian Christian missionary Karl Gützlaff, who worked for the British East India Company, and later the colonial Hong Kong government. Well-versed in several Chinese dialects, Gützlaff is usually known as 郭實臘 (pinyin: Guō Shílà) or 郭士立 (pinyin: Guō Shìlì) in Chinese documents. The street name is recorded as 郭士立街 in several 19th-century directories.

== History ==
Before the Second World War, the alley was known as "Red-Haired Dame Street" (Chinese: 紅毛嬌街; pinyin: Hóngmáojiāo Jiē; Wade–Giles: Hung-mao-chiao Chieh; Jyutping: hong4 mou4 giu1 gaai1) by the locals – "red-haired" then being a common adjective for describing Westerners. One urban legend holds that western women in Hong Kong were frequently seen on that street, owing to the presence of numerous Chinese cobblers who specialised in repairing western-style shoes – this gave rise to the alternate nickname "Shoe Repairing Street" (補鞋街; bou2 haai4 gaai1 ).

Another hypothesis holds that some western brothels operated there during the early days of colonial Hong Kong, hence the name "Red-Haired Dame Street".

Recent findings indicate that the tenements in Nos. 2-10 Gutzlaff Street were inhabited by a powerful lady called Ng Akew (a.k.a. Hung Mo Kew (Red-Haired Kew)). The nickname "Hung Mo Kew Street" (‘Red-Haired Kew Street’) was subsequently coined for Gutzlaff Street.

Today the street is well known to local gourmets as the location of one of the few surviving dai pai dongs in Hong Kong.

== See also ==
- List of streets and roads in Hong Kong
