= Lyndhurst Terrace =

Street in Hong Kong

Coordinates: 22.28248°N 114.15421°E

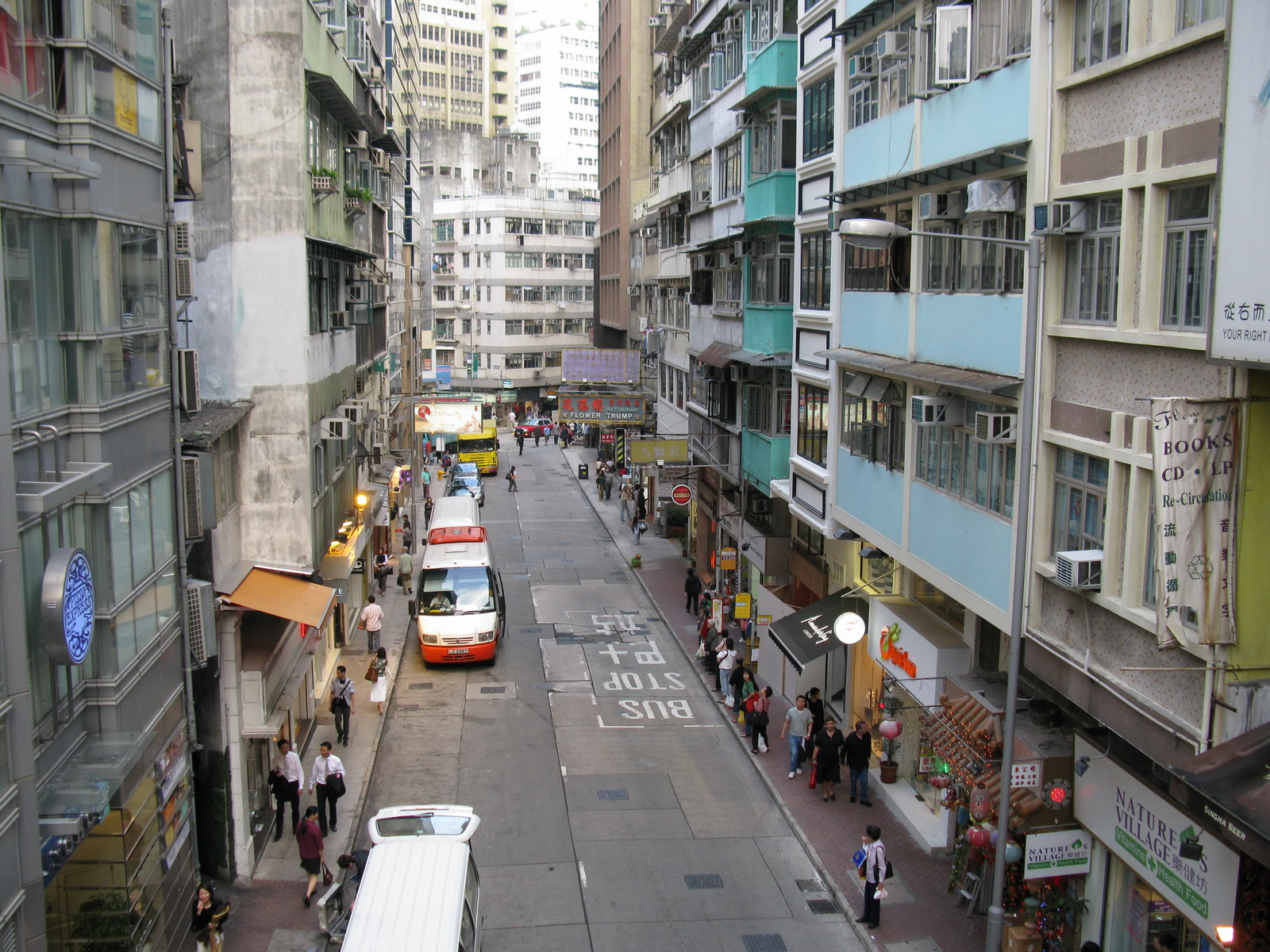
- Lyndhurst Terrace, looking toward Wellington Street from the Central-Mid-Levels escalators
- Interactive map of Lyndhurst Terrace
- Native name: 擺花街 (Yue Chinese)
- Namesake: John Copley, 1st Baron Lyndhurst
- Length: 188 m (617 ft)
- Location: Central, Hong Kong
- East end: Wellington Street / Pottinger Street
- West end: Hollywood Road / Graham Street

Lyndhurst Terrace (Chinese: 擺花街; Jyutping: baai2 faa1 gaai1) is a street in the Central area of Hong Kong. It was built on a slope in southern Central district, linking Hollywood Road and Wellington Street, at its intersection with Pottinger Street. In the middle it meets Gage Street, Cochrane Street and the Central–Mid-Levels escalators.

== Name ==
The terrace was named after John Singleton Copley Lyndhurst, an Assistant Magistrate. The Cantonese name 擺花 (baai2 faa1) literally means "flower arrangement", possibly because of presence of numerous stalls in the area in the mid-19th century, selling flowers to the customers of the nearby brothels.

== History ==
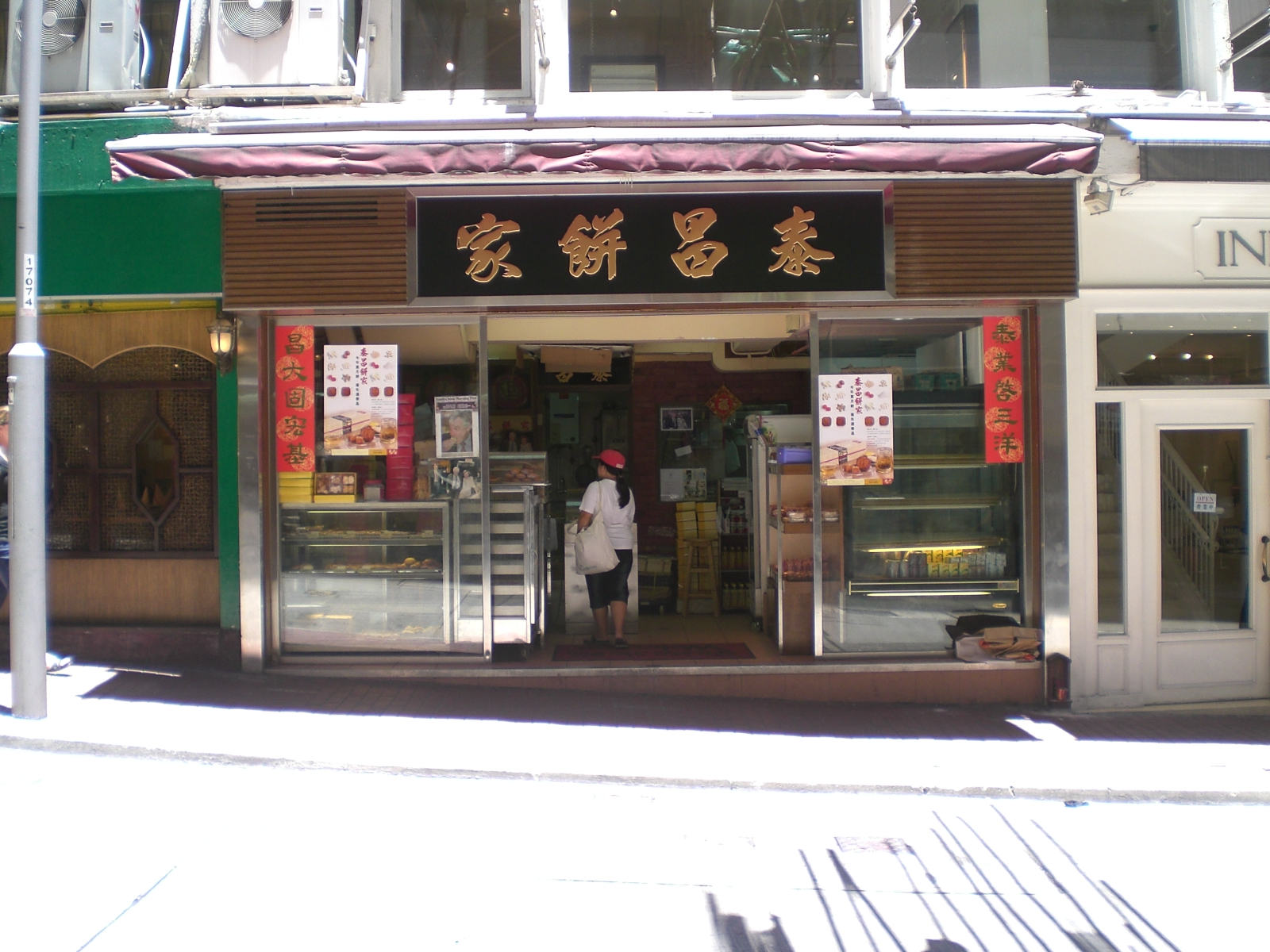
Tai Cheong Bakery, Lyndhurst Terrace branch in 2007.

Lyndhurst Terrace and the surrounding area were the location of some of the earliest brothels established in Hong Kong, in the mid-19th century. Western prostitutes concentrated there, while Chinese brothels were located in the Tai Ping Shan area near Po Hing Fong. They gradually moved to Possession Street and relocated to Shek Tong Tsui in 1903. The name of the street appears in this context in James Joyce's Finnegans Wake, published in 1939.

The original Site of Xing Yan Lou Western Restaurant (杏讌樓西菜館) was located at 2 Lyndhurst Terrace. The restaurant was a historical meeting place for Dr Sun Yat-sen when he was studying at the Hong Kong College of Medicine for Chinese, from where he graduated in 1892, and a refuge for revolutionaries outside Hong Kong, who took part in the failed "1895 Guangzhou uprising" (廣州起義) against the Qing dynasty in Guangzhou. The site, located at the intersection with Pottinger Street, is part of the Central and Western Heritage Trail and the Dr Sun Yat-sen Historical Trail. It is now occupied by a commercial building (8 Lyndhurst Terrace).

The Tai Cheong Bakery (泰昌餅家) first opened at Lyndhurst Terrace in 1954. Their egg tarts gained fame when Chris Patten, the last Governor of Hong Kong, called them "the best Egg Tarts in the world". It later received intense media attention when it closed in May 2005, citing increasing rent, reaching HK$80,000 per month. It reopened at another location in the street in September 2005 and went on to open several new outlets across Hong Kong.

== Intersections ==
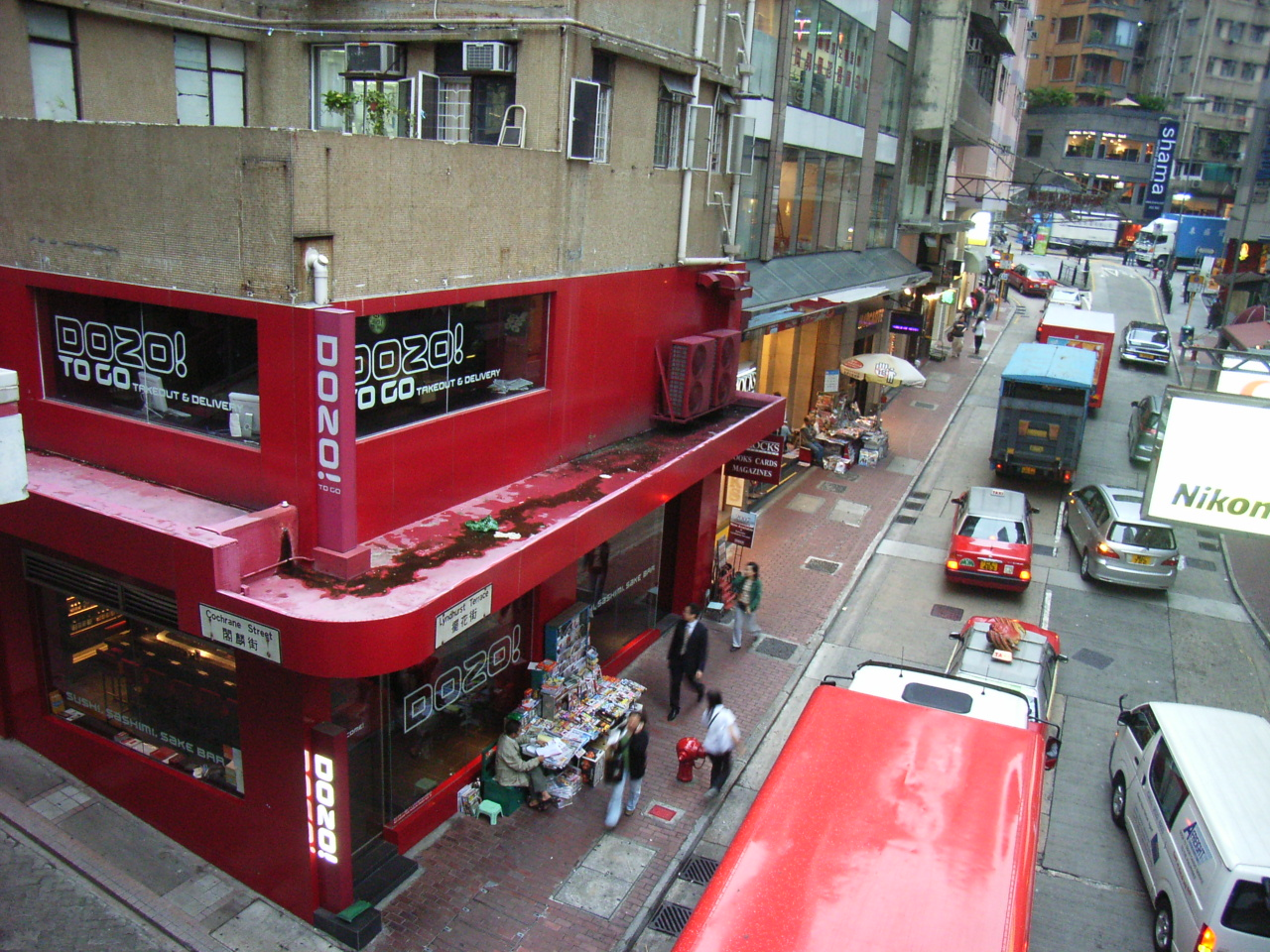
Lyndhurst Terrace, looking toward Hollywood Road from the Central–Mid-Levels escalators.

The entire route is in Central, Central and Western District.

km	mi	Destinations	Notes
0.000	0.000	Wellington Street	Eastern terminus
0.000	0.000	Pottinger Street	Pathway
0.105	0.065	Gage Street	
0.105	0.065	Cochrane Street	Pathway; Access to Central–Mid-Levels escalator and walkway system
0.155	0.096	Gutzlaff Street	Pathway
0.188	0.117	Hollywood Road	Western terminus
0.188	0.117	Graham Street	Eastbound closed to traffic
1.000 mi = 1.609 km; 1.000 km = 0.621 mi: Closed/former
