= Tsui Wah =

Tsui Wah may refer to:

- Tsui Wah Restaurant
- Tsui Wah Ferry
