= Graham Street =

Street in Central, Hong Kong

Coordinates: 22.28278°N 114.15326°E

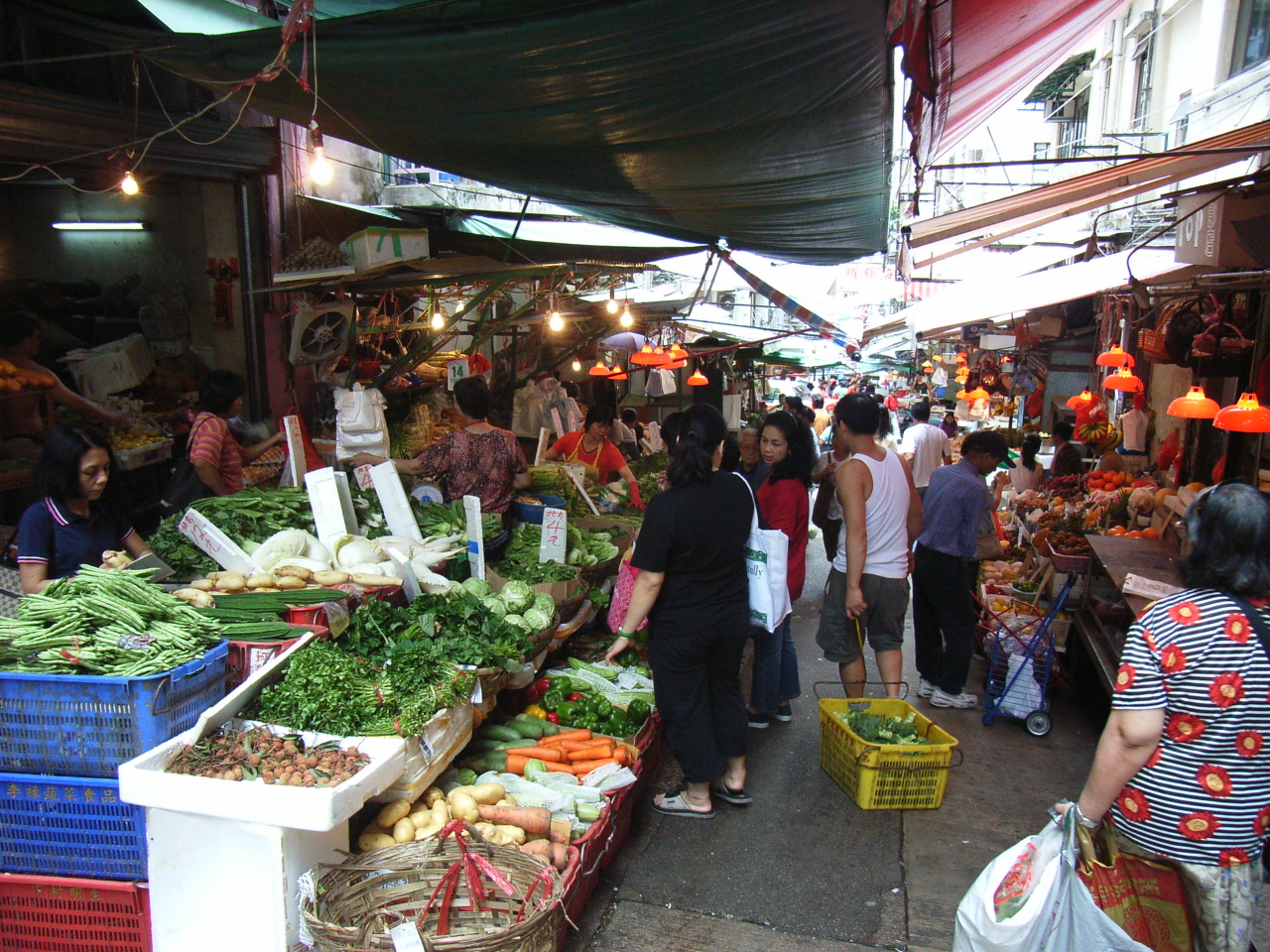
Fresh food stalls

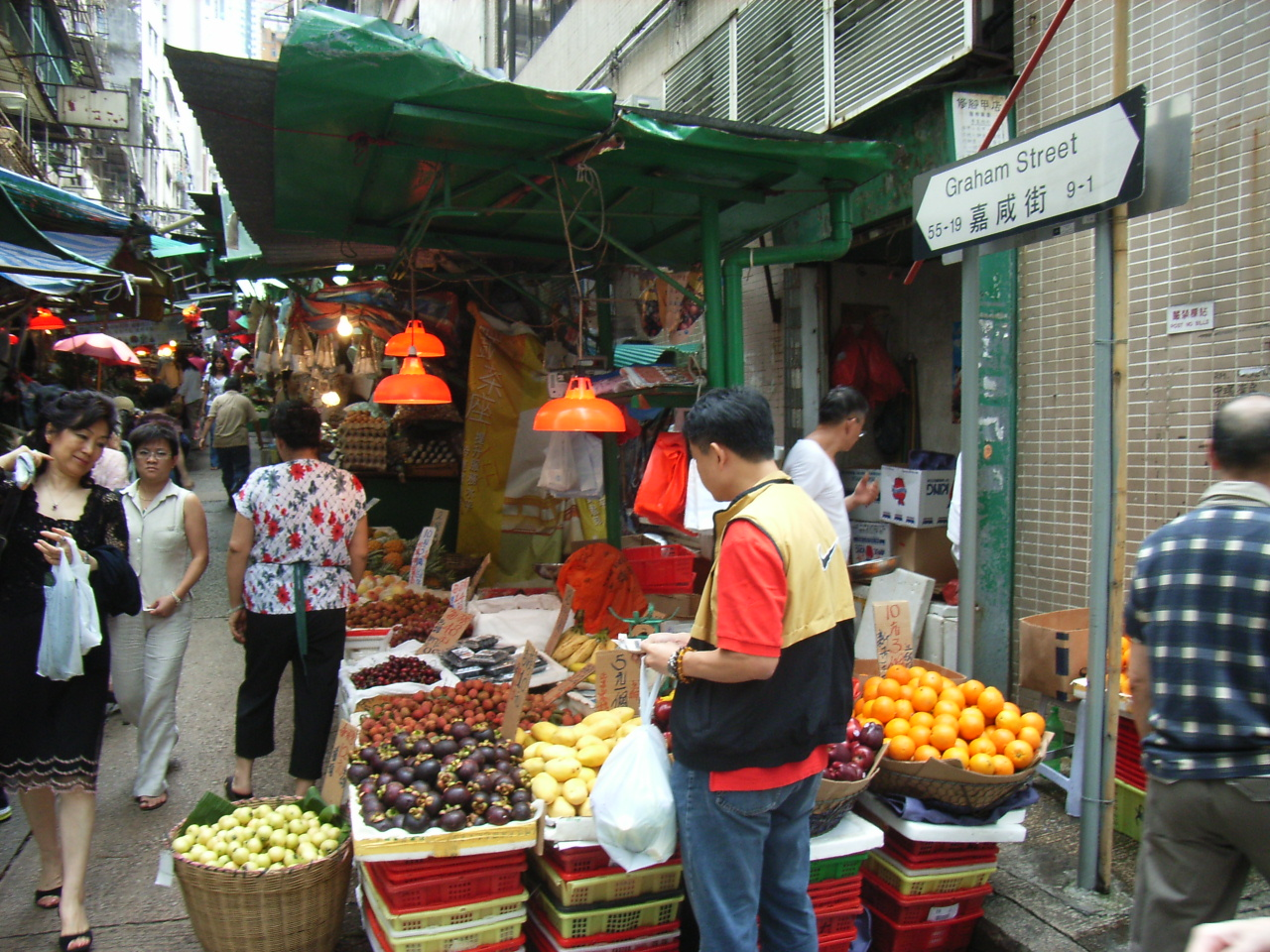
Fruit stalls

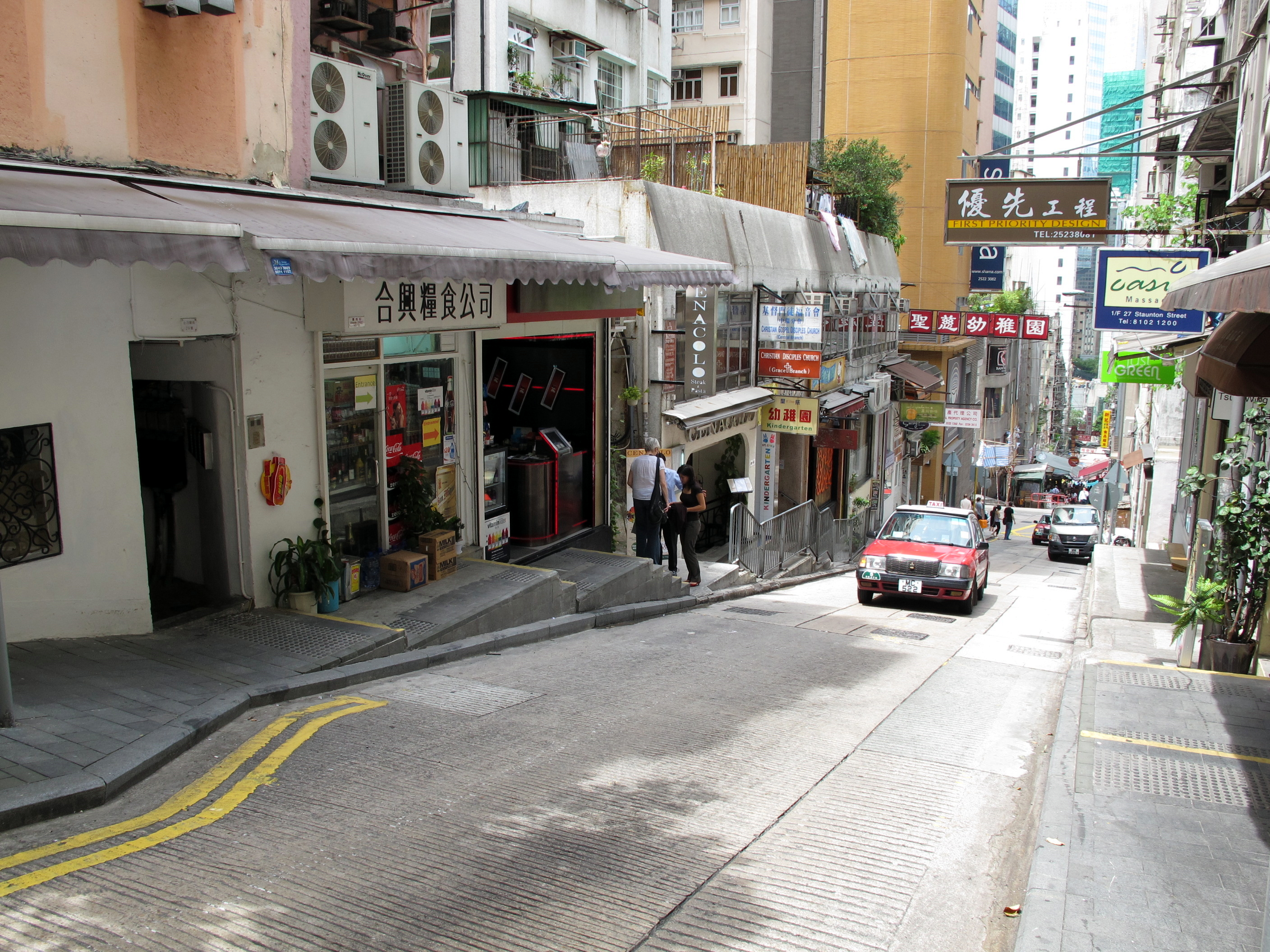
Upper section of Graham Street, between Hollywood Road and Staunton Street.

Graham Street (Chinese: 嘉咸街) is a street in Hong Kong and the location of Graham Street Market, one of the oldest continuously operating street markets in Hong Kong. It was named after former Home Secretary and First Lord of the Admiralty Sir James Graham.

== Location ==
Located in Central, Hong Kong Island, the street starts from Queen's Road Central and runs uphill and south to Staunton Street, crossing Stanley Street, Wellington Street, Gage Street, Lyndhurst Terrace and Hollywood Road. The Street Market occupies the section between Queen's Road Central and Hollywood Road.

== History ==
The market dates back more than 160 years. The street is narrow but allows a row of stalls on either sides and sells various foodstuff.

One of the earliest cinemas in Hong Kong, the Bijou Theatre (比照戲院), opened in Graham Street in 1907.

Queen Elizabeth II, accompanied by Governor Murray MacLehose, visited the Graham Street market on 5 May 1975 to speak with locals.

Graham Street was featured in a scene from the 2001 film Rush Hour 2.

The Urban Renewal Authority is redeveloping Graham Street and Peel Street and planning to demolish the market. This will affect over 37 buildings in the process.
