= Stanley Street, Hong Kong =

Street in Central, Hong Kong

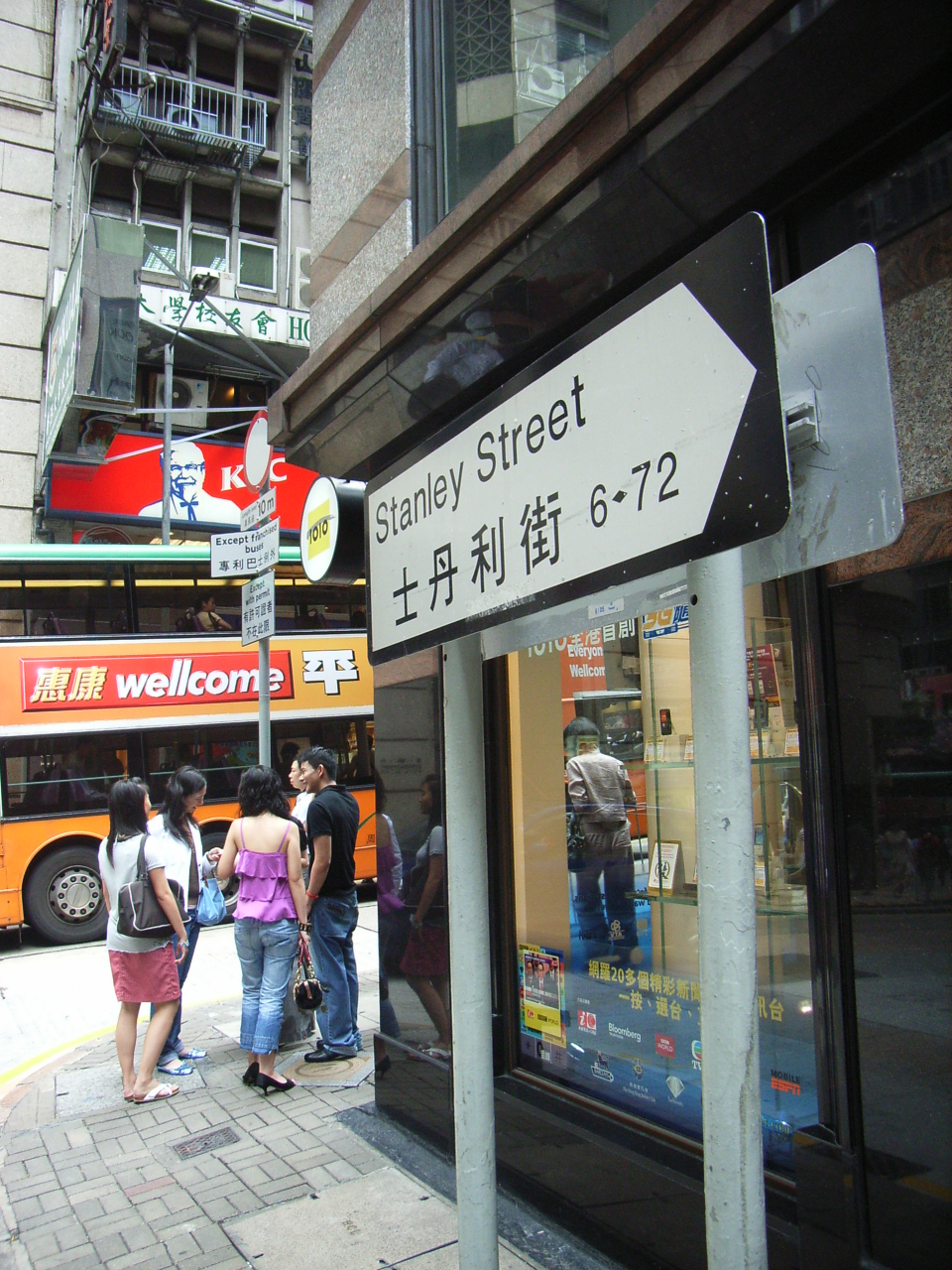
- The eastern end of Stanley Street, near D'Aguilar Street.
- Chinese: 士丹利街
Transcriptions
Standard Mandarin
- Hanyu Pinyin: Shìdānlì Jiē
Yue: Cantonese
- Jyutping: si6 daan1 lei6 gaai1

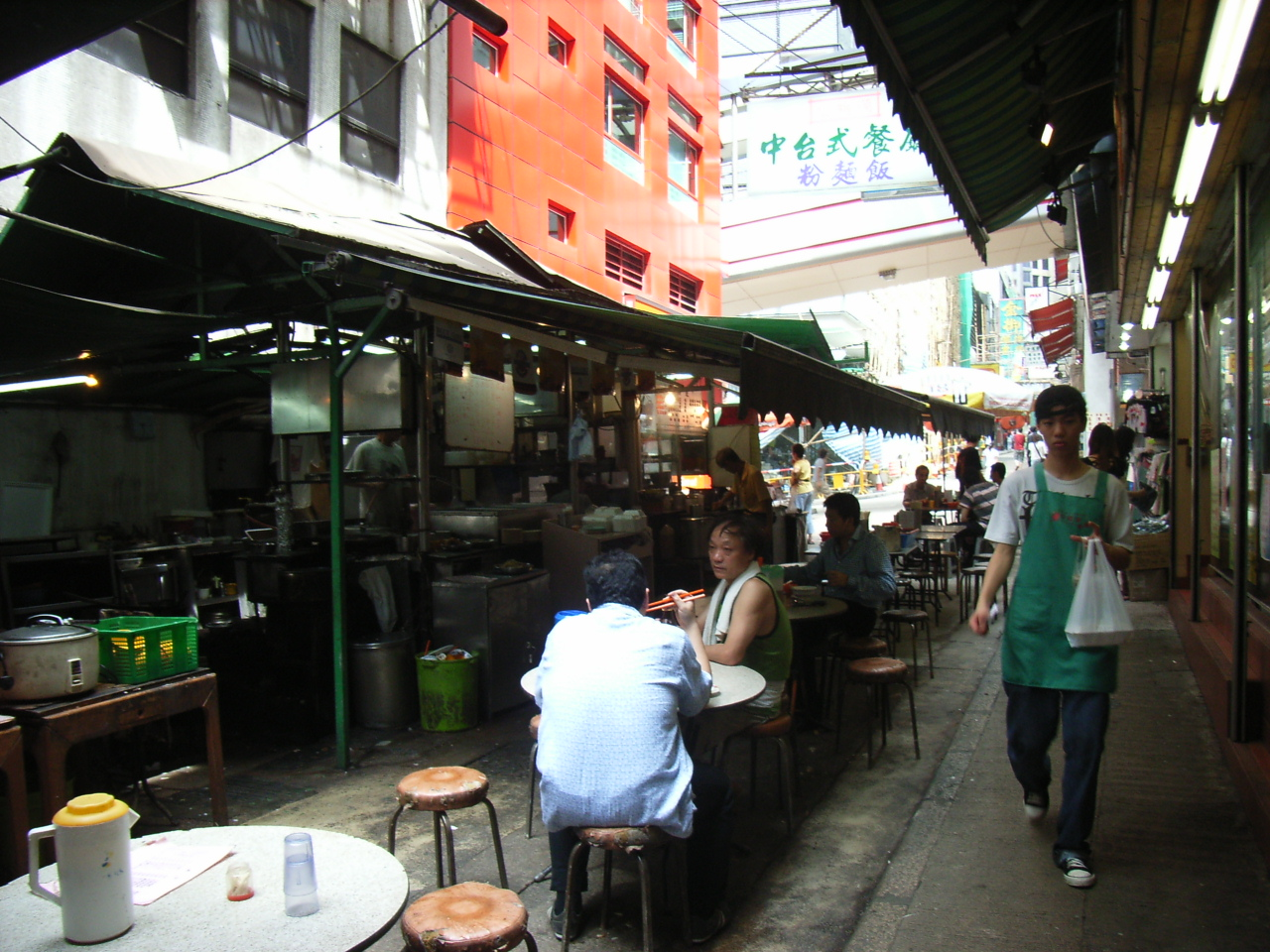
Dai pai dong at the west side of the street.

Stanley Street is a street in Central on the Hong Kong Island of Hong Kong.

== Location ==
Stanley Street runs parallel to Queen's Road Central between D'Aguilar Street and Graham Street. It intersects with Pottinger Street, Cochrane Street and Gutzlaff Street along the way.

== History ==
The street was named after Lord Stanley (subsequently Earl of Derby), British Colonial Secretary at the time of the cession of Hong Kong to the United Kingdom, and subsequently Prime Minister.

Japanese prostitutes constituted the majority of Japanese residents of Hong Kong in the late 19th century, and there were 13 licensed Japanese brothels and 132 prostitutes in Hong Kong in 1901. These brothels were initially located in Central, mostly on Hollywood Road, Stanley Street and Wellington Street. They later moved to Wan Chai.

The street is associated with revolution activities to overthrow Imperial China led by Sun Yat-sen around the 1900s although all traces have long gone.

== Features ==
- Luk Yu tea house and dim sum restaurant
- At the Graham Street end of the street, several dai pai dongs have operated for many years and provide traditional tastes of dishes.

== See also ==
- List of streets and roads in Hong Kong
