= Hollywood Road =

Street on Hong Kong Island

Coordinates: 22°17′03″N 114°09′01″E

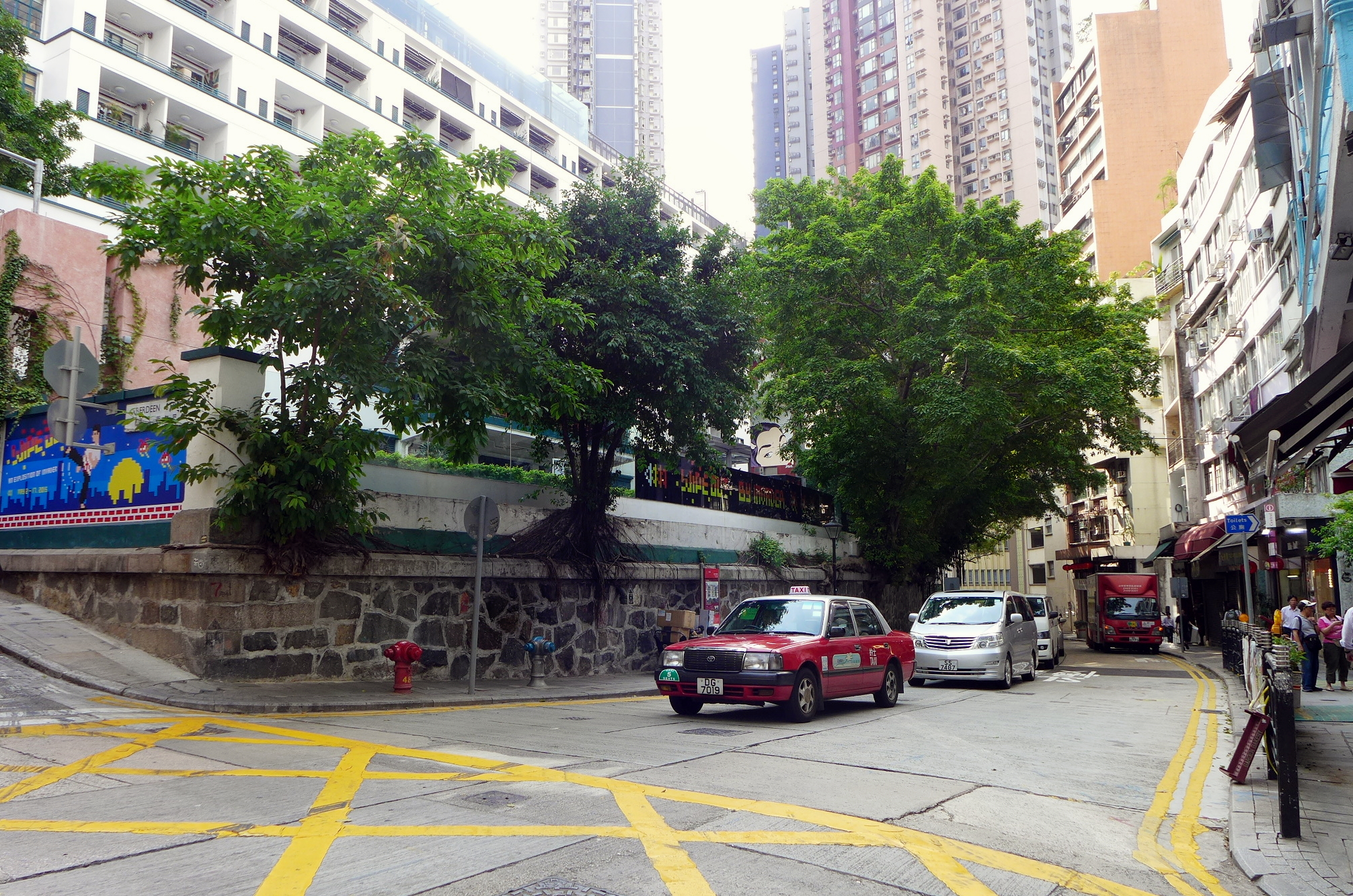
- Hollywood Road, looking west from the junction with Aberdeen Street
- Interactive map of Hollywood Road
- Length: 1.0 km (0.62 mi)
- West end: Queen's Road West
- East end: Arbuthnot Road / Wyndham Street

Construction
- Completed: 1844; 182 years ago

Hollywood Road
- Traditional Chinese: 荷李活道 (also 荷里活道)
Transcriptions
Standard Mandarin
- Hanyu Pinyin: Hélǐhuó Dào
Yue: Cantonese
- Yale Romanization: hòhléihwuht douh
- Jyutping: ho4lei5wut6 dou6
- IPA: [hɔ̏ːle̬iwùːt tòu]

Hollywood Road (Chinese: 荷李活道; Jyutping: ho4 lei5 wut6 dou6) is a street on Hong Kong Island. It runs between Central and Sheung Wan, with Wyndham Street, Arbuthnot Road, Ladder Street, Upper Lascar Row, and Old Bailey Street all within its vicinity.It intersects with several streets, including Po Yan Street.

== Name ==
Whilst the origin of the name is unclear, it is believed to have been named by Sir John Francis Davis, the second Governor of Hong Kong, after his family home in Westbury-on-Trym, near Bristol, England. A popular folk etymology is that holly shrubs were growing in the area when the road was constructed. However, such plants were not indigenous to Hong Kong, and would need to have been imported.

== History ==
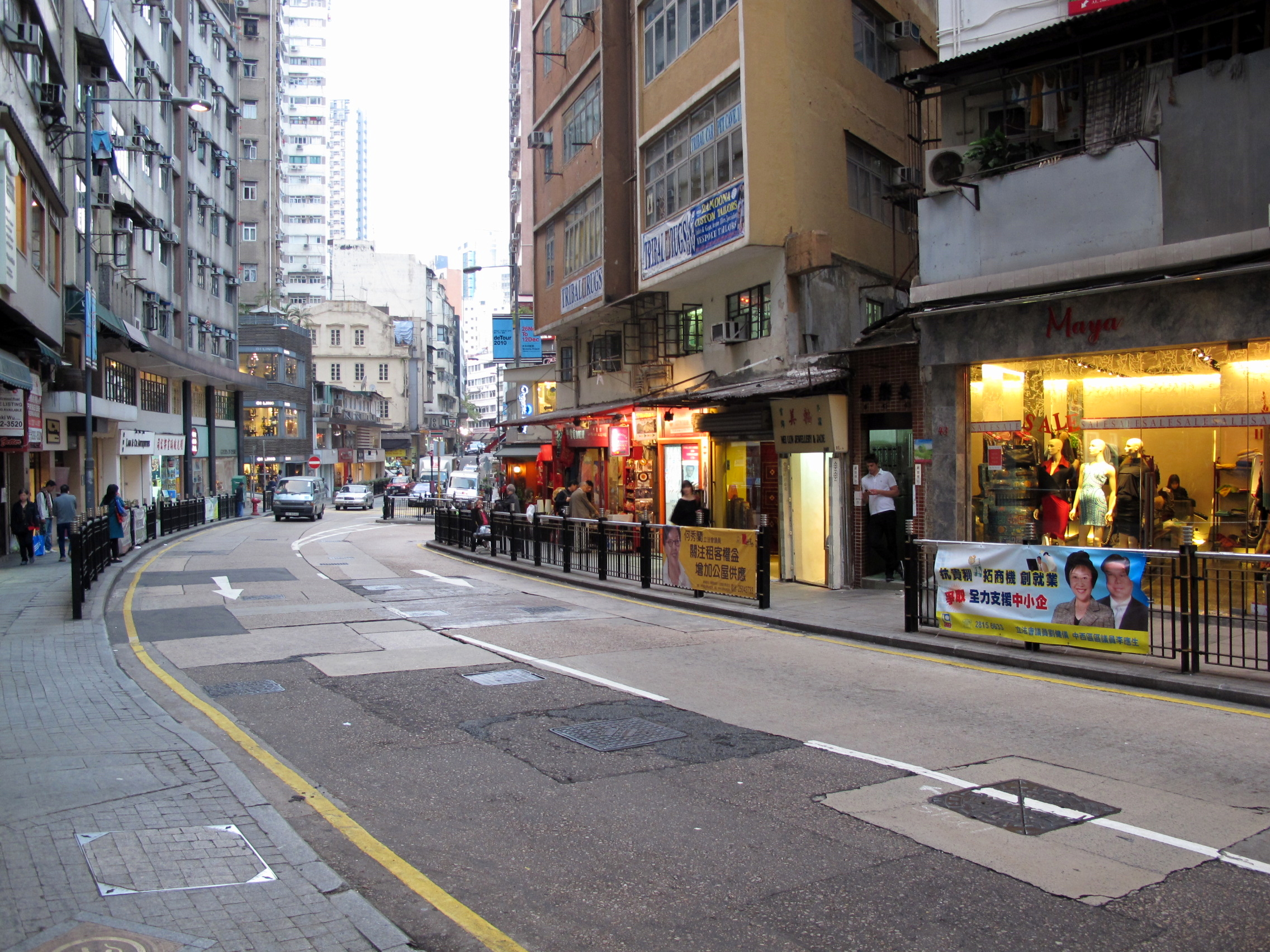
Hollywood Road, looking northwest towards the junction with Graham Street

When the colony of Hong Kong was founded, Hollywood Road was the second road to be built after Queen's Road Central, but it was the first to be completed. Like most major roads in the early years of the colony, Hollywood Road was built by the Royal Engineers. More than 100 years ago, Hollywood Road was rather close to the coastline. In those days, foreign merchants and sailors docked their vessels nearby, and sold the antiques and artefacts they had "collected" from China on their way back to Europe. Hollywood Road became famous as an antique market, and remains so today.

There was a Union Church in the street founded in 1844 by the Reverend James Legge, a Scottish missionary who had been sent to Hong Kong in 1843 by the London Missionary Society. The first Union Church was built in 1845 on Hollywood Road above Central. Every Sunday an English language service was held in the morning, and a Chinese language service in the afternoon. The Church was later relocated to a new site on Staunton Street.

On the afternoon of 15 December 1941, during the Battle of Hong Kong, Japanese bombs hit the junction of Old Bailey Street and Caine Road, the junction of Pottinger Street and Hollywood Road, Wellington Street and the Central Police Station. The attack – which had been launched that day – was the start of a systematic bombardment of Hong Kong Island's north shore. North Point Power Station was severely damaged during the raids.

The 1960 Hollywood film The World of Suzie Wong was shot in part in Hollywood Road; an old wooden building on the road was transformed into a bar for the movie.

== Features ==
Plum Blossoms – the first art gallery to open on Hollywood Road

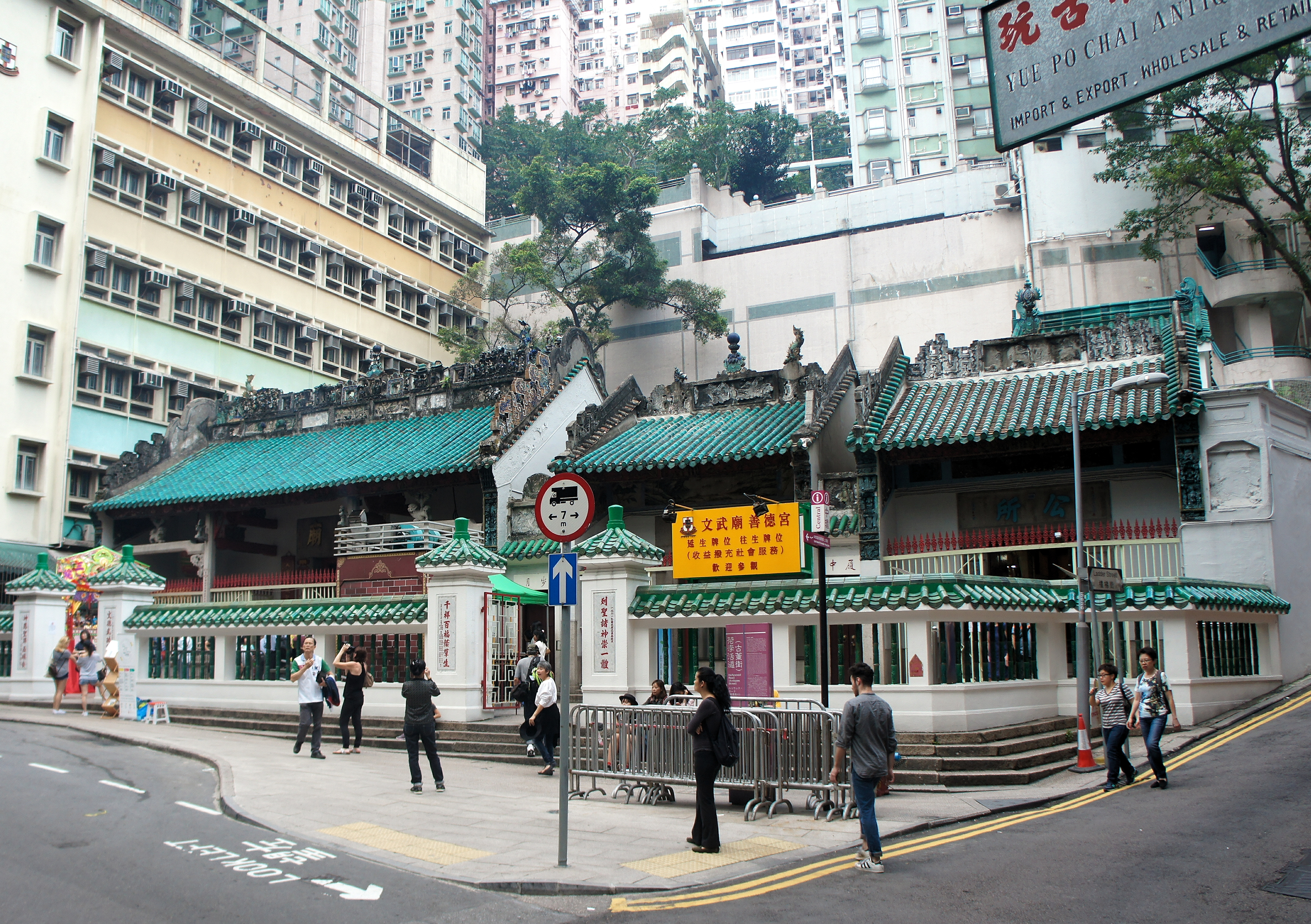
The Man Mo Temple compound along Hollywood Road, at the junction with Ladder Street

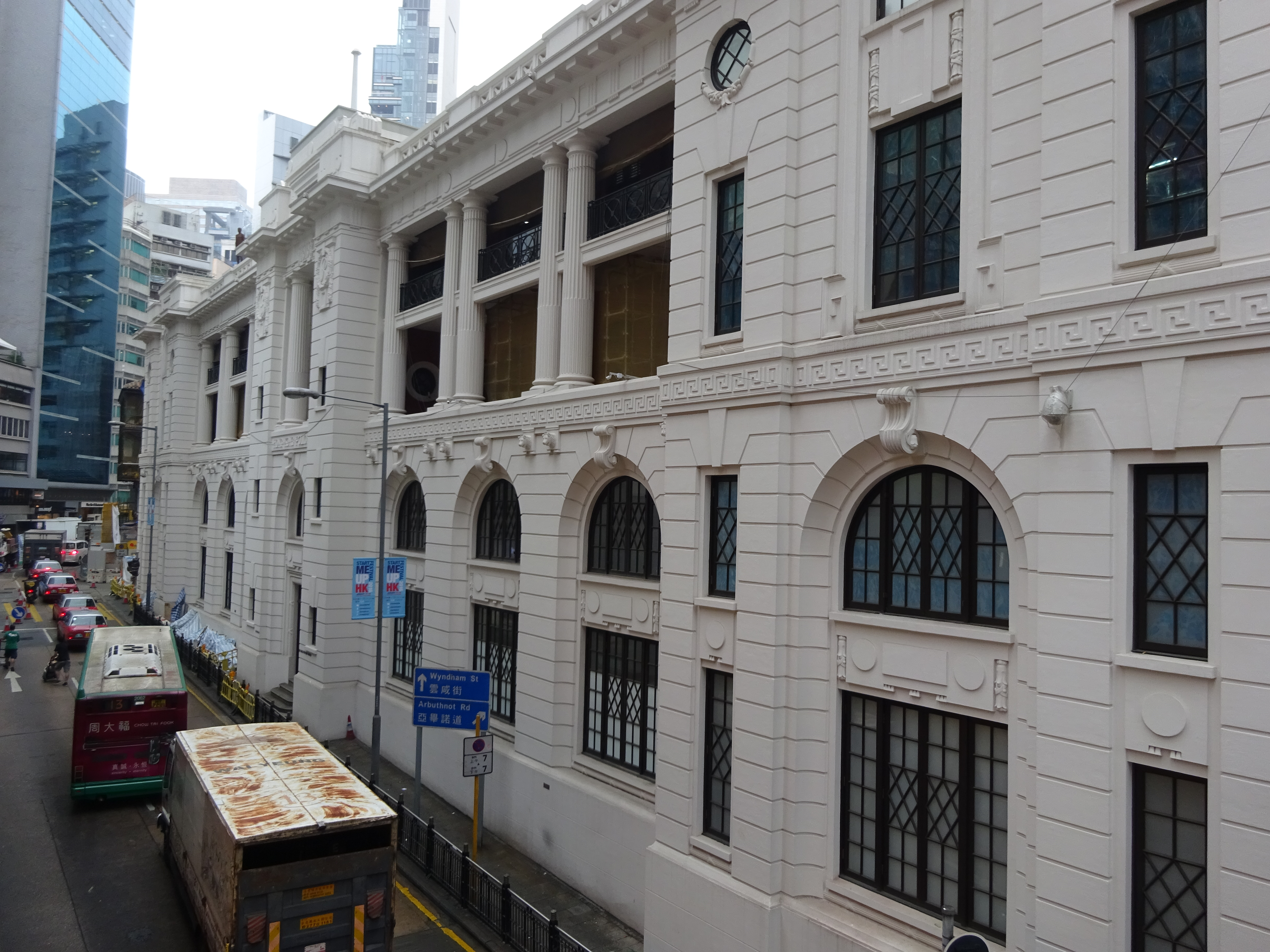
Central Police Station

Hollywood Road is filled with trinket and antique shops of all sorts: from Chinese furniture to porcelain ware; from Buddha sculptures to Tibetan rugs; from Japanese netsukes to Coromandel screens; and from Ming dynasty ceramic horsemen to kitsch Maoist memorabilia. Previously known solely for antique shops, Hollywood Road has developed into a contemporary art district in Hong Kong. The first gallery to open was Plum Blossoms in 1987, and many more have opened along the road since then.

=== Man Mo Temple ===
Man Mo Temple or Man Mo Miu (文武廟) is a common sort of temple for worshipping the Man Tai (文帝), Man Cheong and Mo Tai (武帝), Kwan Tai, and to pray for good examination results. The temple on Hollywood Road was built in 1847, and functioned as a courthouse in the early years of the colony. It has been managed by Tung Wah Group of Hospitals since 1908, and is a declared monument.

=== Central Police Station ===
Central Police Station was the first police station in Hong Kong. The oldest structure within the compound is a barrack block built in 1864. It is a three-storey building constructed alongside Victoria Prison. An extra storey was added in 1905. In 1919, the Headquarters Block facing Hollywood Road was constructed. 1925 saw the construction of the two-storey Stable Block in the northwest corner of the procession ground – it was later used as a munitions store.

=== Other features ===
Other features along Hollywood Road include:

- Hollywood Road Park
- Liang Yi Museum: a private museum of design, craftsmanship, and heritage.
- PMQ: a historic site containing the old Hollywood Road Police Married Quarters, now used as a mixed-use venue for arts and design.

== Intersections ==
The entire road is in Central and Western District.

Location	km	mi	Destinations	Notes
Sheung Wan	0.00	0.00	Queen's Road West	Western terminus
Sheung Wan	0.08	0.050	Po Yan Street	
Sheung Wan	0.14	0.087	Possession Street	
Sheung Wan	0.16	0.099	Pound Lane	
Sheung Wan	0.20	0.12	Ng Kwai Fong	Pathway
Sheung Wan	0.20	0.12	Wa Lane	Pathway
Sheung Wan	0.22	0.14	Upper Station Street	
Sheung Wan	0.25	0.16	Lok Ku Road	
Sheung Wan	0.25	0.16	Sai Street	
Sheung Wan	0.27	0.17	Water Lane	Pathway
Sheung Wan	0.29	0.18	Tung Street	
Sheung Wan	0.35	0.22	Tank Lane	Pathway
Sheung Wan	0.42	0.26	Ladder Street	
Sheung Wan	0.47	0.29	Ping On Lane	
Sheung Wan	0.57	0.35	Shing Wong Street	
Sheung Wan	0.63	0.39	Shin Hing Street	Pathway
Sheung Wan	0.67	0.42	Mee Lun Street	Pathway
Sheung Wan	0.68	0.42	Aberdeen Street	
Sheung Wan	0.73	0.45	Elgin Street	
Sheung Wan	0.76	0.47	Peel Street	
Central	0.81	0.50	Graham Street	
Central	0.81– 0.83	0.50– 0.52	Lyndhurst Terrace	
Central	0.87	0.54	Shelley Street	Pathway
Central	0.91	0.57	Cochrane Street	Pathway
Central	0.91	0.57	Old Bailey Street	
Central	0.98	0.61	Pottinger Street	Pathway
Central	1.00	0.62	Arbuthnot Road / Wyndham Street	Eastern terminus
1.000 mi = 1.609 km; 1.000 km = 0.621 mi: Closed/former

== See also ==
- Central–Mid-Levels escalator
- List of streets and roads in Hong Kong
- SoHo
