= Peel Street, Hong Kong =

Street in Hong Kong

Coordinates: 22.28238°N 114.15235°E

Peel Street
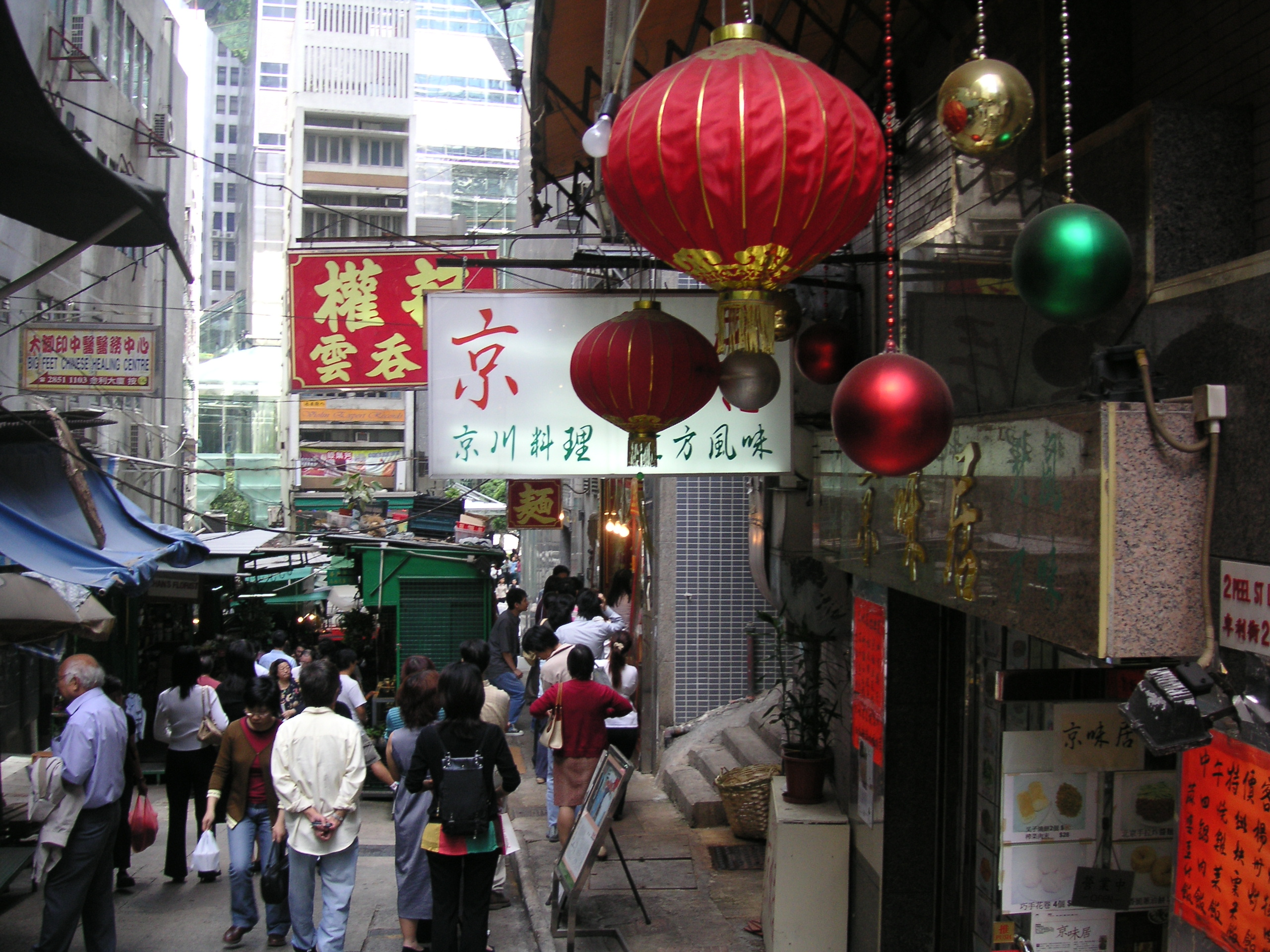
- The historic market on Peel Street
- Chinese: 卑利街
Transcriptions
Standard Mandarin
- Hanyu Pinyin: Bēilì Jiē
Yue: Cantonese
- Yale Romanization: bei1 lei6 gaai1
- Jyutping: bei1 lei6 gaai1

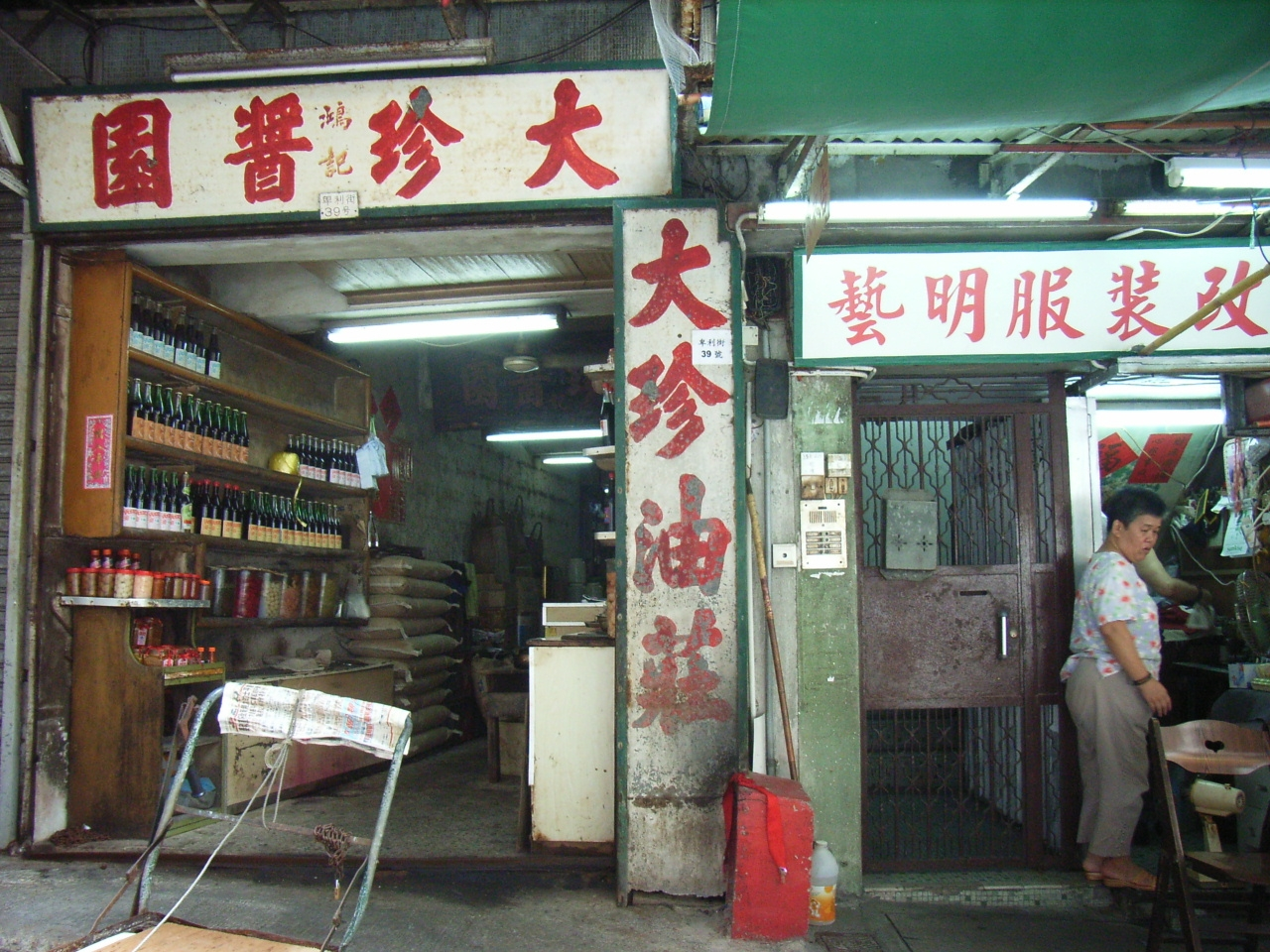
A pair of old shops on Peel Street

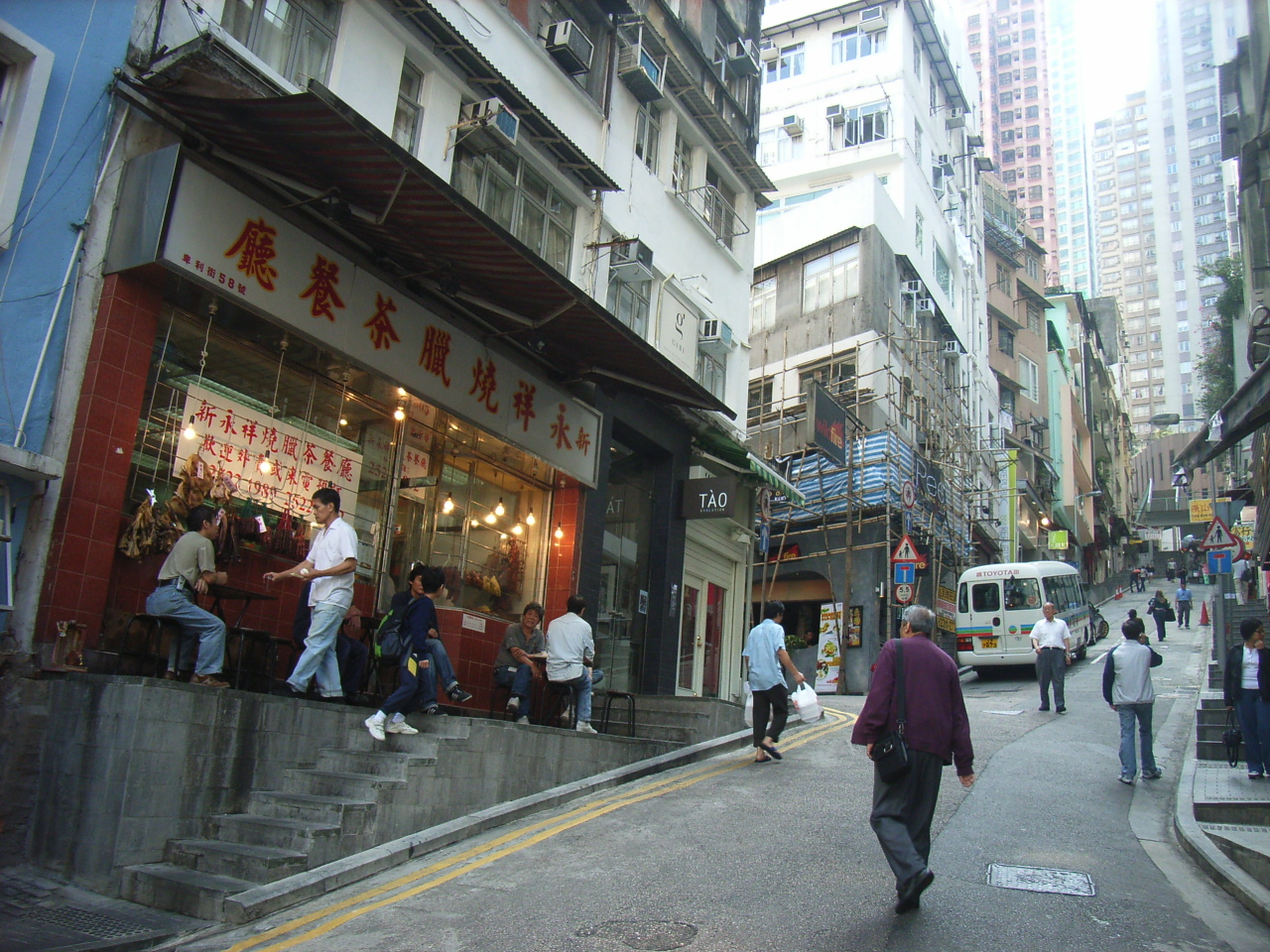
Peel Street, looking south towards the corner of Elgin Street

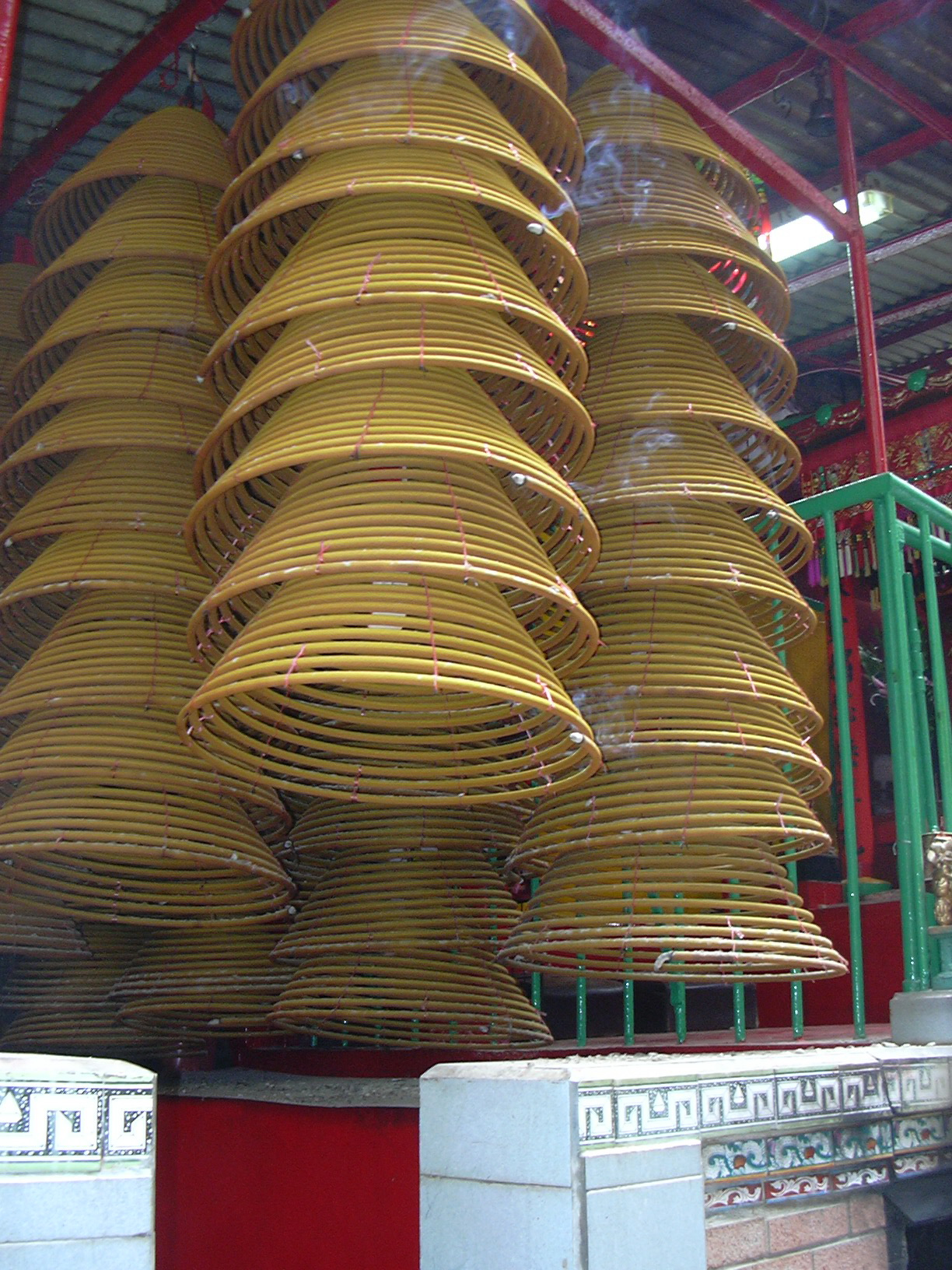
Pak Kung shrine on Peel Street

Peel Street (Chinese: 卑利街; Jyutping: bei1 lei6 gaai1) is located in Central, Hong Kong. It is named after Sir Robert Peel, a two-time British prime minister.

== History ==
The road was built in the 1840s, at the start of the colonial era, and named for British prime minister Sir Robert Peel. Initially settled by Westerners, the Chinese became the dominant ethnic group in the 1870s, and the expatriates had all but gravitated towards Conduit Road in the Mid-Levels by the 1950s.

Wai Siu-pak, founder of Yee Tin Tong pharmacy, once lived in Wise Mansion, a large house at the top of Peel Street next to Robinson Road. The section of Peel Street between Hollywood Road and Staunton Street was known for its calligraphers, who specialised in making signboards in the 1950s and 1960s. The part below Hollywood Road was well known for its Indian curry restaurants. However, expensive rents have driven these trades out of the area, to be replaced by modern tower blocks. The century-old Graham Street market is located in the lower reaches of Peel Street.

== Description ==
Peel Street is a long, narrow street which begins at its northern tip in Queen's Road Central, and climbs southwards into the Mid-Levels, where it terminates at the corner of Mosque Junction, directly beneath the Central–Mid-Levels escalator. It is largely pedestrianised, with only certain sections open to traffic, and generally has the quality of a ladder street.

Peel Street's greatest claim to fame was the Ho Hei Kee Umbrella Maker (何希記造遮) shop, run by Ho Hung-hei, which had attracted the attention of the media when he received a Guinness World Record for producing the world's most expensive umbrella. Ho died in 2015 after closing shop his the previous year.

There is a shrine dedicated to Pak Kung (伯公), situated just below the junction with Staunton Street.

== Redevelopment plan ==
The Urban Renewal Authority announced the Peel Street/Graham Street redevelopment project on 26 February 2007 with the intention of breathing new life into the area. Since the project focused on the historic Peel Street market, it sparked much interest in the conservation of Hong Kong culture.

== Gallery ==
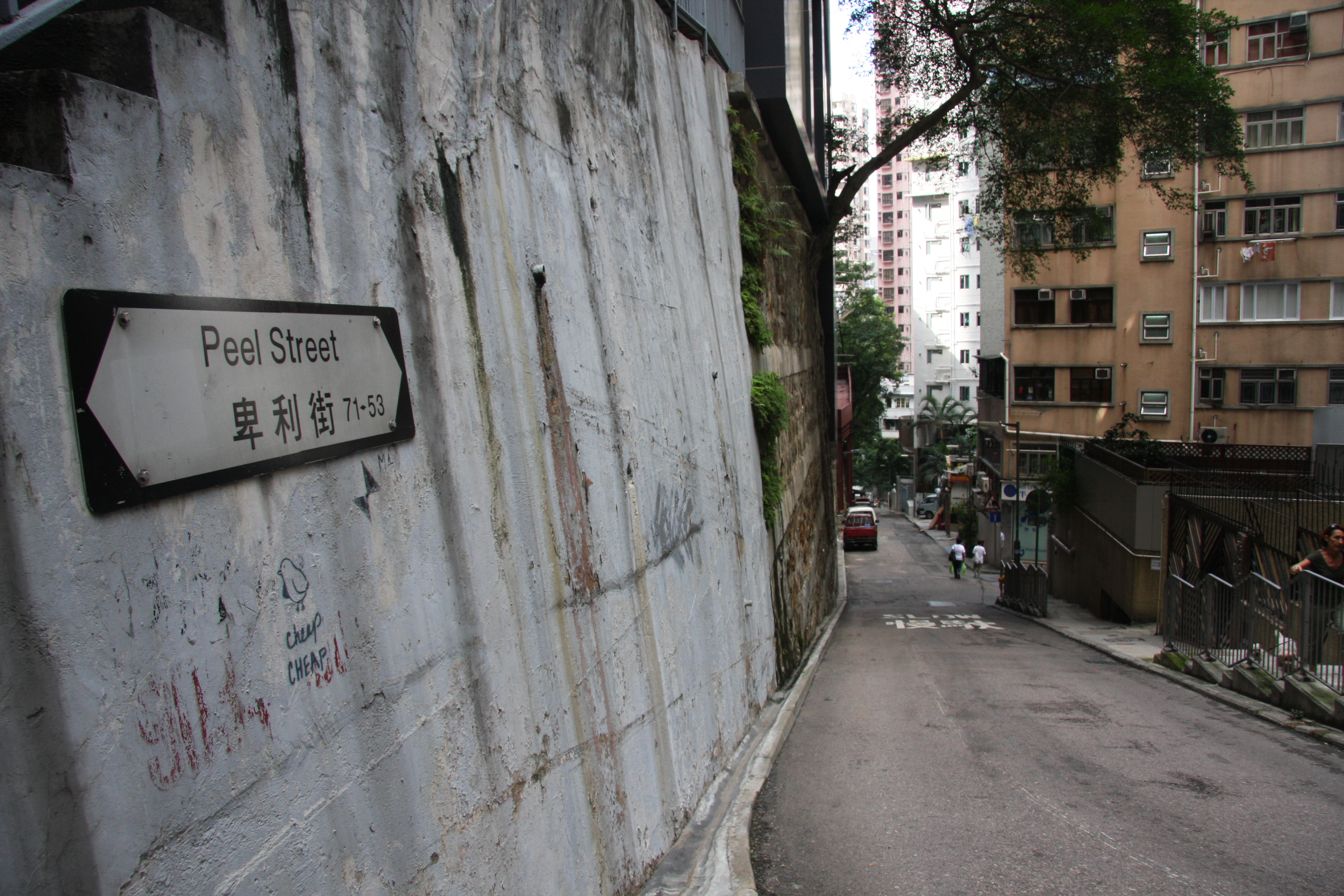
View of Peel Street, from its terminus on the corner with Mosque Junction

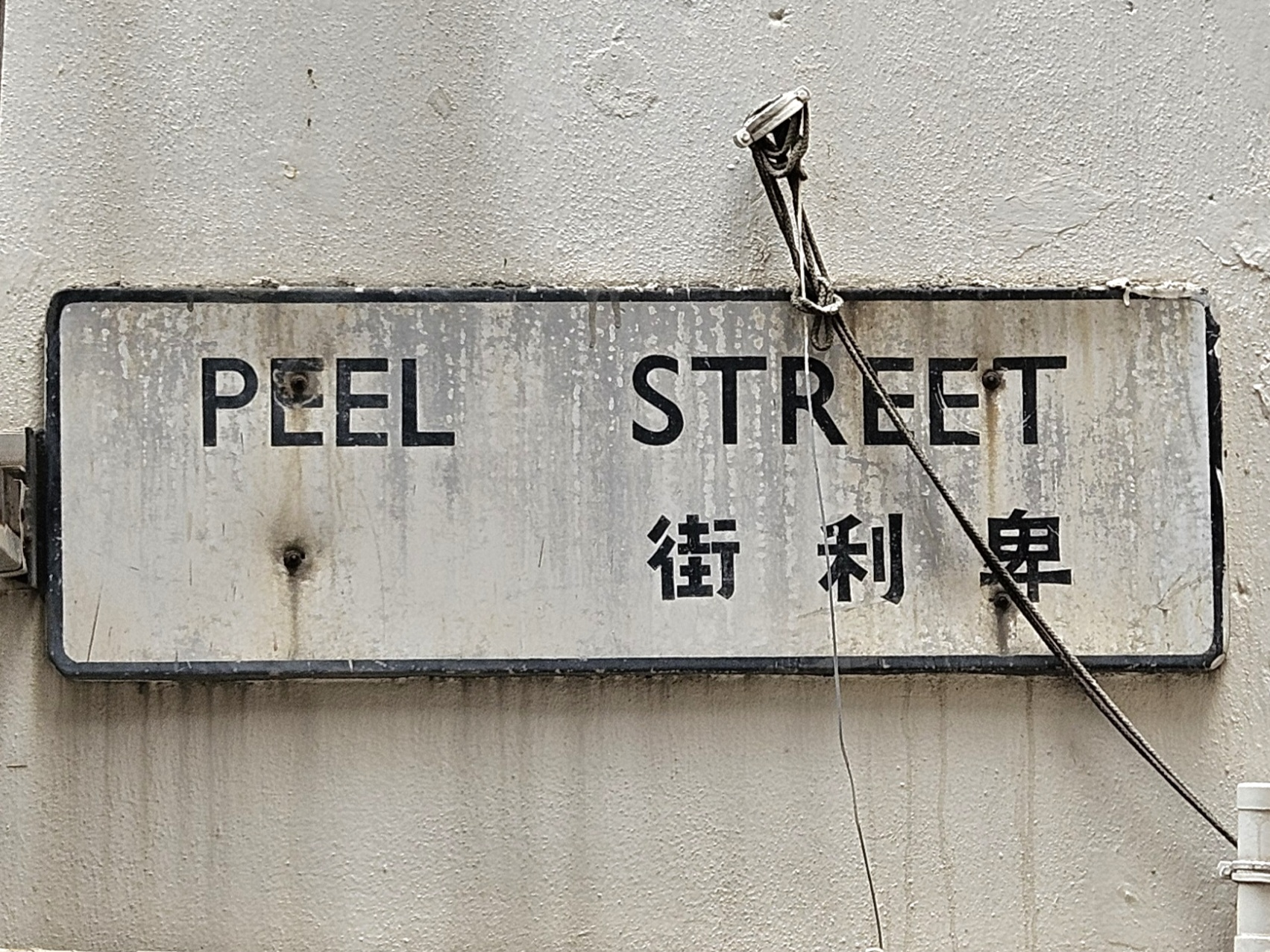
Vintage street nameplate

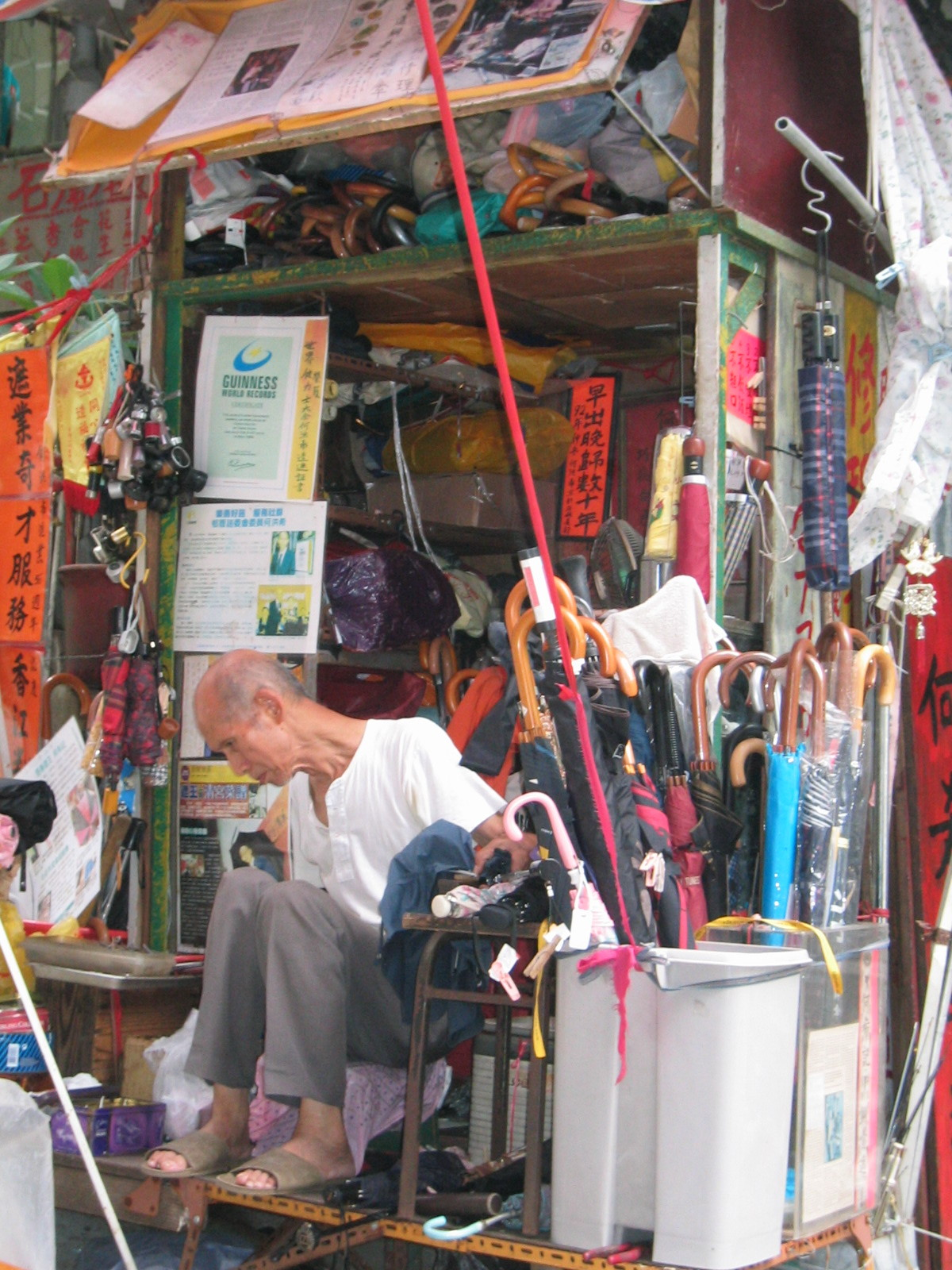
Mr. Ho and his Guinness World Record certificate. He was honoured for making the most expensive (£167) umbrella in the world

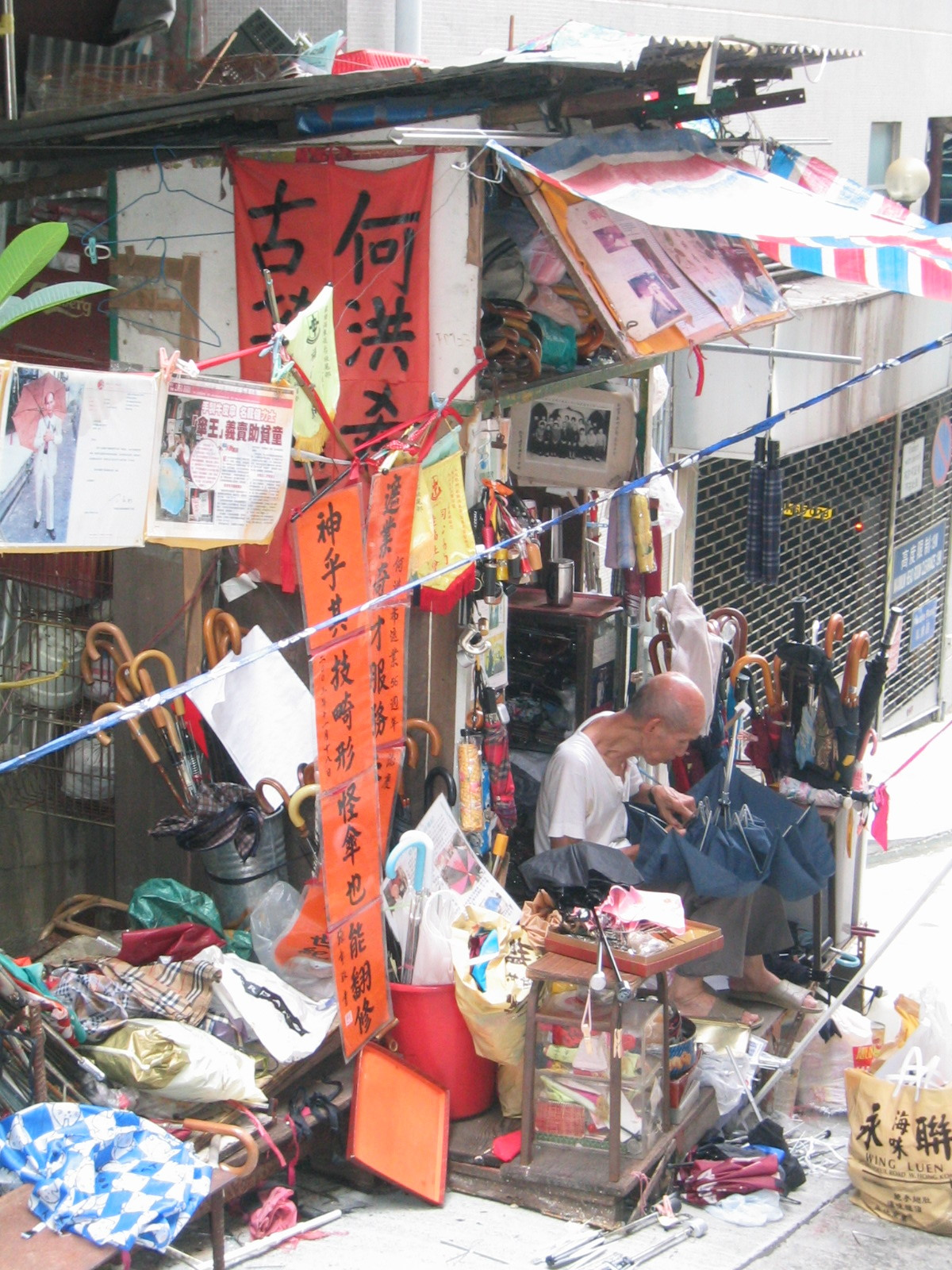
Mr. Ho at work

== See also ==
- List of streets and roads in Hong Kong
