= Luk Yu (restaurant) =

Tea house and restaurant in Hong Kong

Coordinates: 22.282164°N 114.155763°E

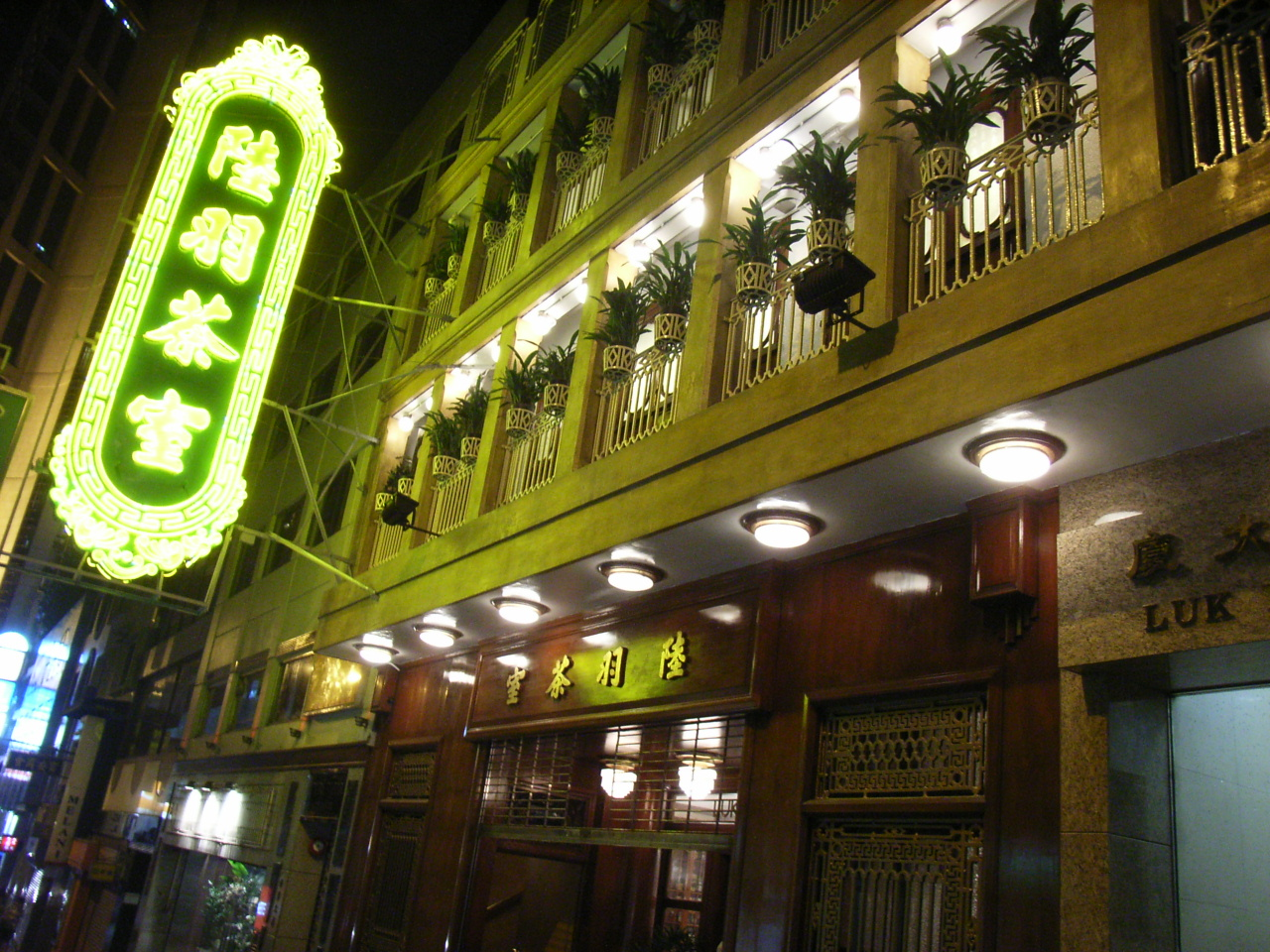
- Traditional Chinese: 陸羽茶室
- Simplified Chinese: 陆羽茶室
Transcriptions
Standard Mandarin
- Hanyu Pinyin: Lù Yǔ Cháshì
Yue: Cantonese
- Jyutping: luk6 jyu5 caa4 sat1

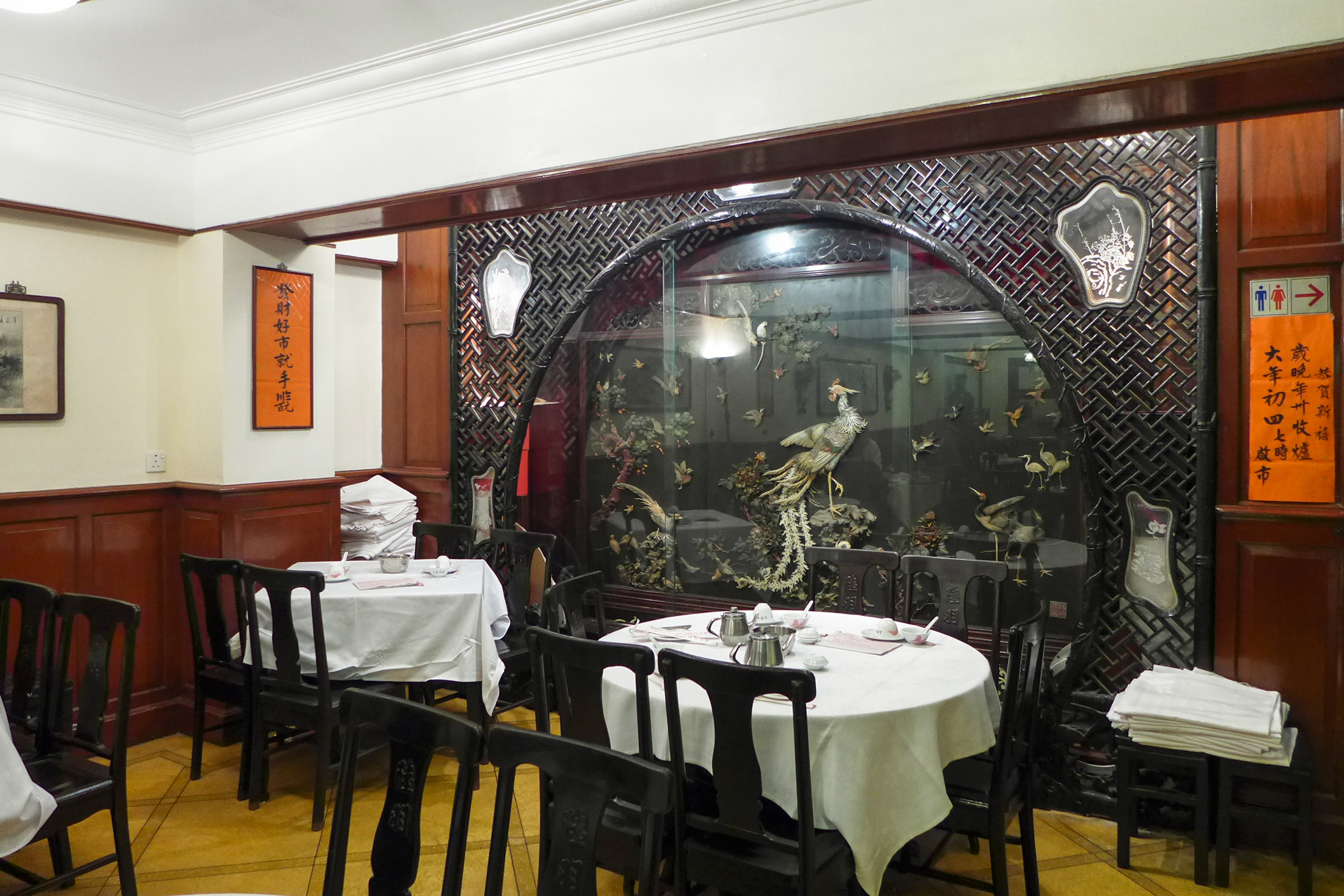
Luk Yu tea house interior

Luk Yu (Chinese: 陸羽茶室) is a teahouse and dim sum restaurant located on Stanley Street, in the Central area of Hong Kong, established in 1933. It is currently the oldest restaurant in Hong Kong.

It is known for its colonial style, adherence to tradition and loyal long-time customers, for whom the entire first floor is unofficially reserved.

It also known for its traditional dishes and dim sum. Some examples are its Sauteed Fillet of Pigeon with Crispy "Kam Wah" Ham (雲腿鵪鶉球), Sweet and Sour Pork with Young Ginger (子薑咕嚕肉), Grouper Toast (石斑多士), and Pig Liver Shiu Mai (豬潤燒賣).

The tea house gets its name from the Tang dynasty poet Luk Yu (陸羽; Lù Yǔ) who wrote The Classic of Tea which describes the history and culture of Chinese tea.

Luk Yu also sells branded tea bags in Hong Kong and the UK.

== Murder of Harry Lam ==
On 30 November 2002, businessman Harry Lam Hon-lit was shot dead at point-blank range while eating breakfast at Luk Yu. His murderer was Yang Wen, a hitman hired by a Hong Kong triad boss.

== See also ==
- Cantonese restaurant
