= Pottinger Street =

Street in Hong Kong

Coordinates: 22.28330°N 114.15589°E

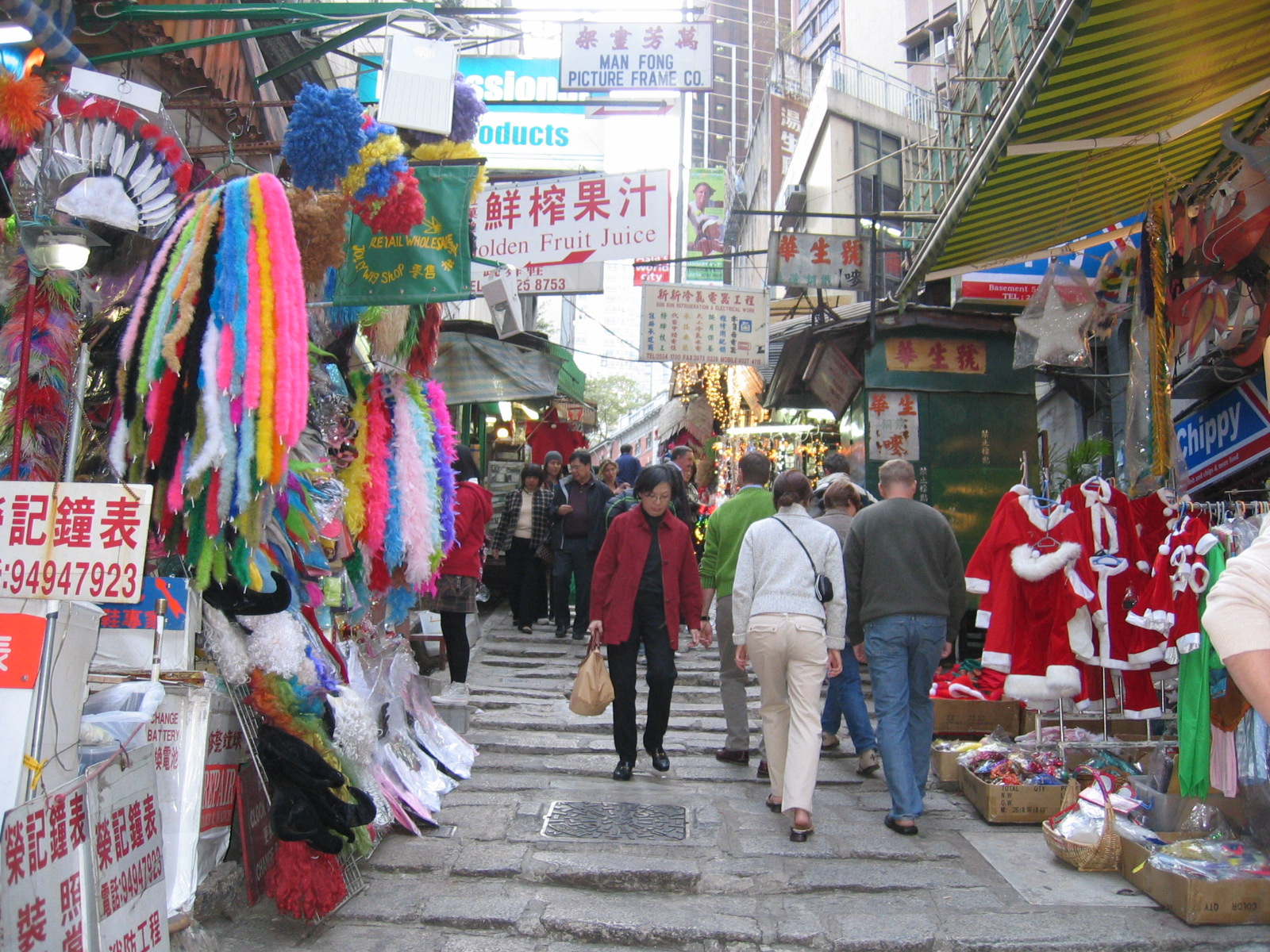
- Section of Pottinger Street between Wellington Street and Stanley Street
- Chinese: 砵典乍街
Transcriptions
Standard Mandarin
- Hanyu Pinyin: Bōdiǎnzhà Jiē
Yue: Cantonese
- Yale Romanization: But dín ja gāai
- Jyutping: But1 din2 zaa3 gaai1

Alternative Chinese name
- Chinese: 砵甸乍街
Transcriptions
Standard Mandarin
- Hanyu Pinyin: Bōdiànzhà Jiē
Yue: Cantonese
- Yale Romanization: But dīn ja gāai
- Jyutping: But1 din1 zaa3 gaai1

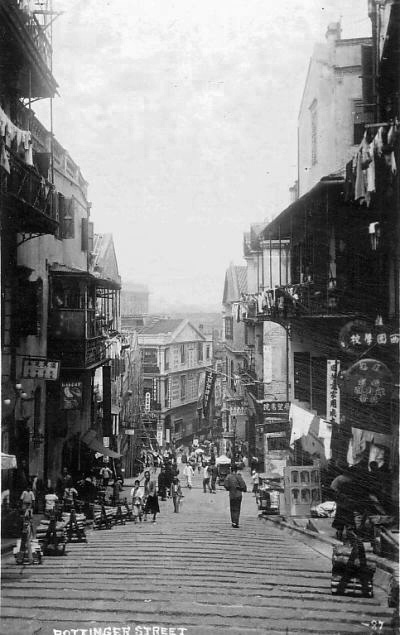
Pottinger Street in the 1930s

Pottinger Street is a street in Central, Hong Kong. It is also known as the Stone Slabs Street (Chinese: 石板街; Jyutping: sek6 baan2 gaai1) since the street is paved with uneven granite stone steps. It was named in 1858 after Henry Pottinger, the first Governor of Hong Kong, serving from 1843 to 1844. It is a Grade I historic building.

== Location ==
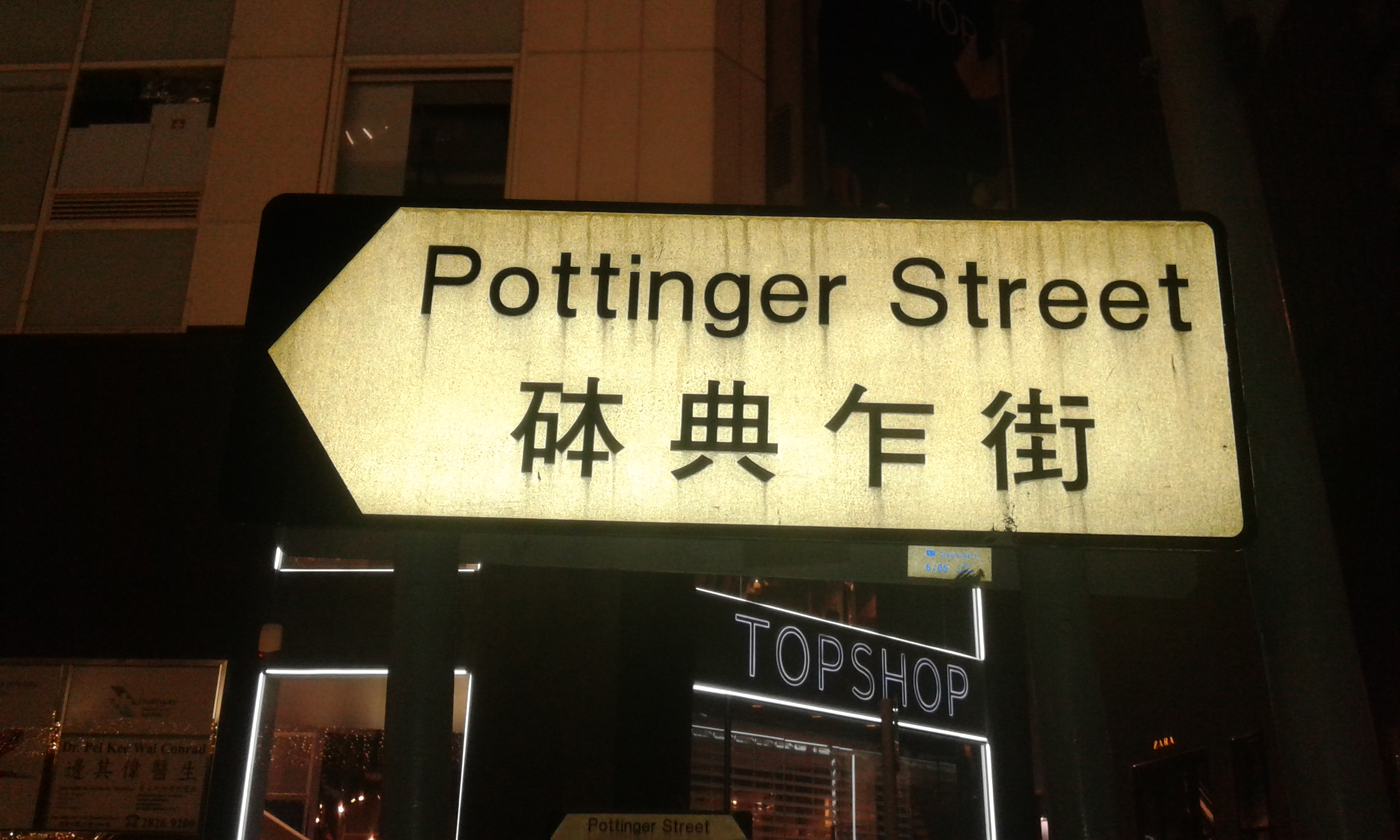
Nameplate for Pottinger Street

The street originally ran the length of the slope between Queen's Road Central and Hollywood Road. This section is entirely covered by stone slabs. Starting from Queen's Road Central, it crosses Stanley Street and Wellington Street where it ends at the eastern end of Hollywood Road, just after it meets Wyndham Street.

Following several land reclamation projects in Central, Pottinger Street was extended north from Queen's Road Central to Connaught Road Central where it intersects with Des Voeux Road Central. The Man Yee Building and Wing On House are located in this section. This is the only section of the street accessible to vehicular traffic.

== History ==
Hong Kong's first Roman Catholic cathedral was built in 1843 at the junction of Pottinger Street and Wellington Street, and was destroyed in a fire in 1859. It was subsequently rebuilt at a different site, and the current Cathedral of the Immaculate Conception on Caine Road was completed in 1888.

In the 19th century, Chinese and European residents lived in separate neighbourhoods. Pottinger Street once acted as a rough boundary between the two groups: the Chinese mainly lived to the west of the street, and Westerners to the east.

An Air Raid Precautions Tunnel was built beneath the street between 1940–41, but was abandoned following the liberation of Hong Kong, and was backfilled in the 1980s.

On the afternoon of 15 December 1941, during the Battle of Hong Kong, Japanese bombs hit the junction of Old Bailey Street and Caine Road, the junction of Pottinger Street and Hollywood Road, Wellington Street and the Central Police Station. The attack – which had been launched that day – was the start of a systematic bombardment of Hong Kong Island's north shore. North Point Power Station was severely damaged during the raids.

== See also ==
- List of streets and roads in Hong Kong
