= Tsui Wah Restaurant =

Hong Kong restaurant chain

Tsui Wah Restaurant Group
- Company type: Public
- Industry: Restaurants
- Founded: 1967; 58 years ago in Mong Kok
- Founder: Choi Cheung Po
- Headquarters: Hong Kong
- Number of locations: 51 (2022)
- Areas served: Hong Kong, Macau, China, Singapore
- Key people: Lee Kun Lun Kenji (CEO)
- Website: tsuiwah.com

Tsui Wah Holdings Limited
- Traditional Chinese: 翠華控股有限公司
- Simplified Chinese: 翠华控股有限公司
Transcriptions
Standard Mandarin
- Hanyu Pinyin: Cuìhuá Kònggǔ Yǒuxiàngōngsī
Yue: Cantonese
- Jyutping: ceoi3 waa4 hung3 gu2 jau5 haan6 gung1 si1

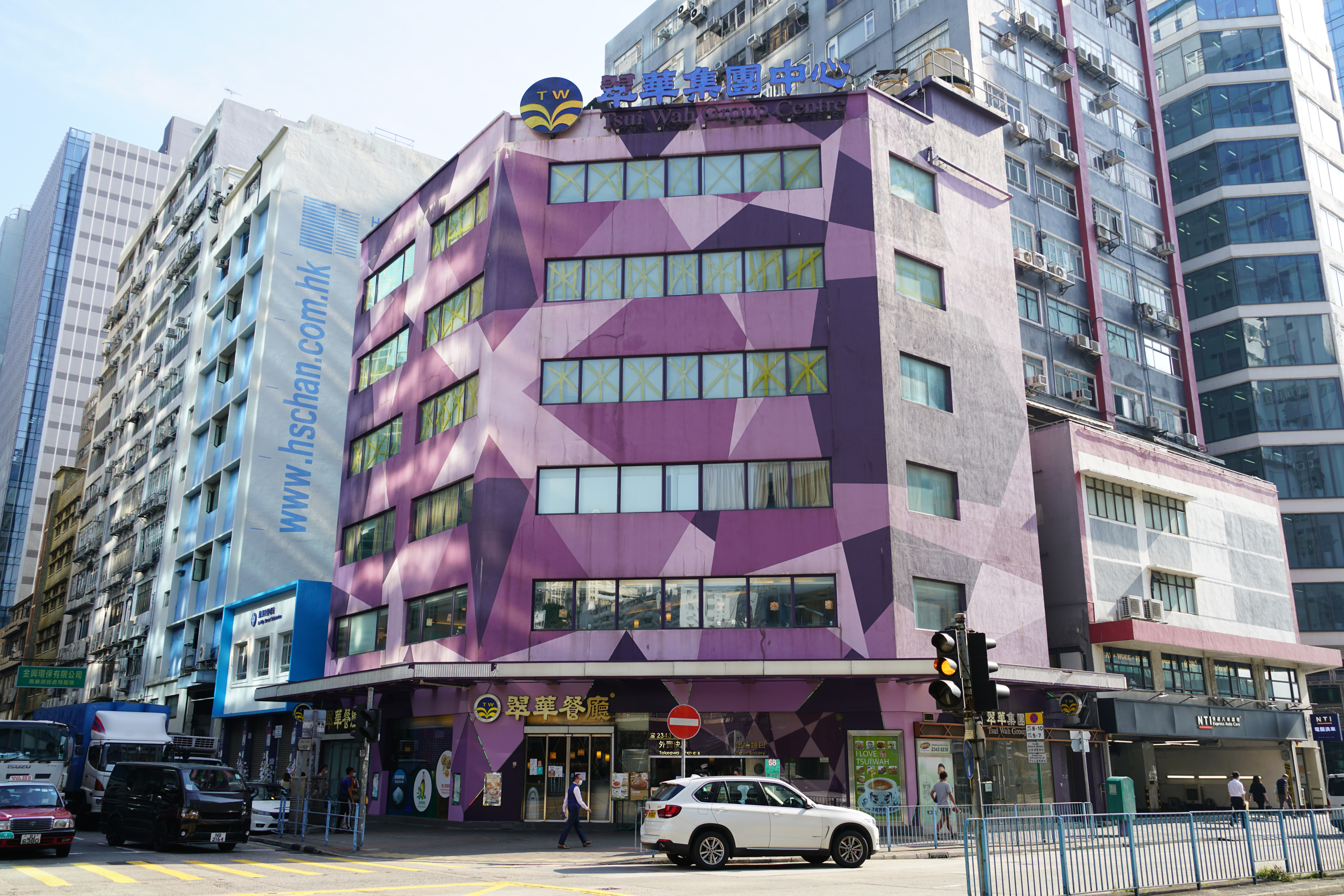
Tsui Wah Group Centre in Ngau Tau Kok

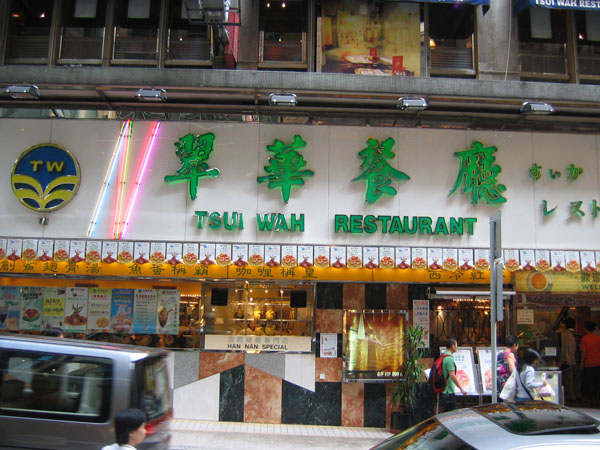
The entrance to the Tsui Wah Restaurant on Wellington Street

Tsui Wah Restaurant (SEHK: 1314) (traditional Chinese: 翠華餐廳; simplified Chinese: 翠华餐厅; Jyutping: ceoi3 waa4 caan1 teng1; pinyin: Cuìhuá Cāntīng) is a chain of tea restaurants (cha chaan teng) owned by Tsui Wah Holdings Limited, headquartered in Hong Kong. The restaurants serve Hong Kong-style food.

As of 2022, the group has 51 branches in Hong Kong, Macau, mainland China and Singapore. The possibly best-known one was on Wellington Street near Lan Kwai Fong, but this has now closed and has surrendered its lease due to trading problems surrounding the COVID-19 epidemic. Affected by COVID-19 lock-downs, the group surrendered leases of many of its locations in Hong Kong; during peak-Covid in 2020, it closed twelve locations at once.

== Background ==
Mr. Choi Cheung Po first opened TsuiWah Ice Dining Room (冰室), the predecessor of Tea Restaurant, in 1967 in Mong Kok. By the time of his retirement in 1989, the company had grown to seven branches, including the first one branded as TsuiWah Tea Restaurant, in San Po Kong, Kowloon.

Originally, the restaurant was intended for the use of construction workers, and the food was cheap and service efficient. As the business grew, it began to target more middle-class customers such as white-collar workers and tourists, while also increasing its prices, which are now above average for the segment. The company also targeted locations in Hong Kong's central business districts, despite higher rents.

For marketing reasons, the company has made a concerted effort to appear in Hong Kong-made films such as Love in a Puff and Lan Kwai Fong, in order to establish Tsui Wah as a cultural icon of Hong Kong.

== Operations ==
Since 2008, Tsui Wah has used a central kitchen to supply branches within a radius of approximately 200 kilometres (120 mi) or delivery time of two hours, in order to ensure operating efficiency and quality and the benefits of centralised purchasing.

Speed of service is a key operating parameter: from the time customers come in to the time they pay their bill is planned to take place within 40 minutes.

Tsui Wah has a communal seating arrangement, with customers expected to share a table with others during busy periods. The tables are also packed more closely, enabling the restaurants to generate more business per square metre.

The company's head office was located in the Tsui Wah Group Centre (翠華集團中心; 翠华集团中心) in Ngau Tau Kok, Kowloon. It was later moved to Tai Wai, Sha Tin.

The first unit outside Hong Kong was opened in Shanghai in 2009, followed by outlets in Macau (2011) and Wuhan (2012).

In 2012, the company was listed on the Hong Kong Stock Exchange.
