= Cochrane Street =

Street in Hong Kong

Coordinates: 22.28290°N 114.15422°E

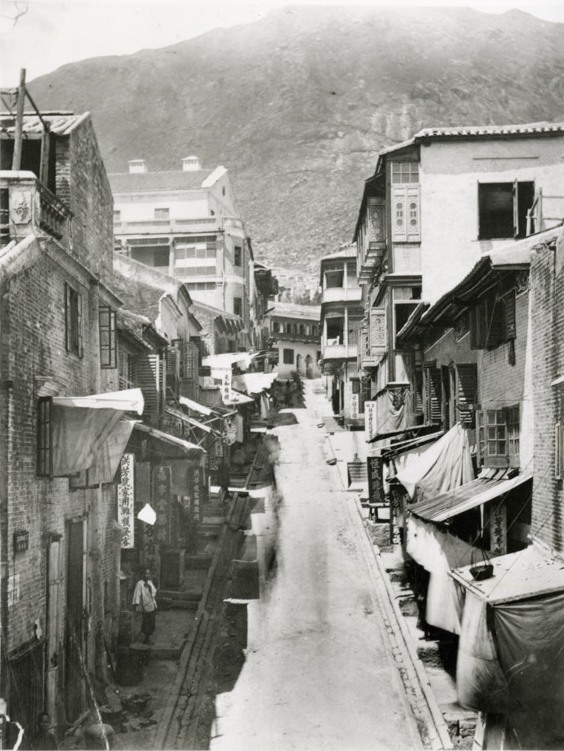
Cochrane Street in the 1870s

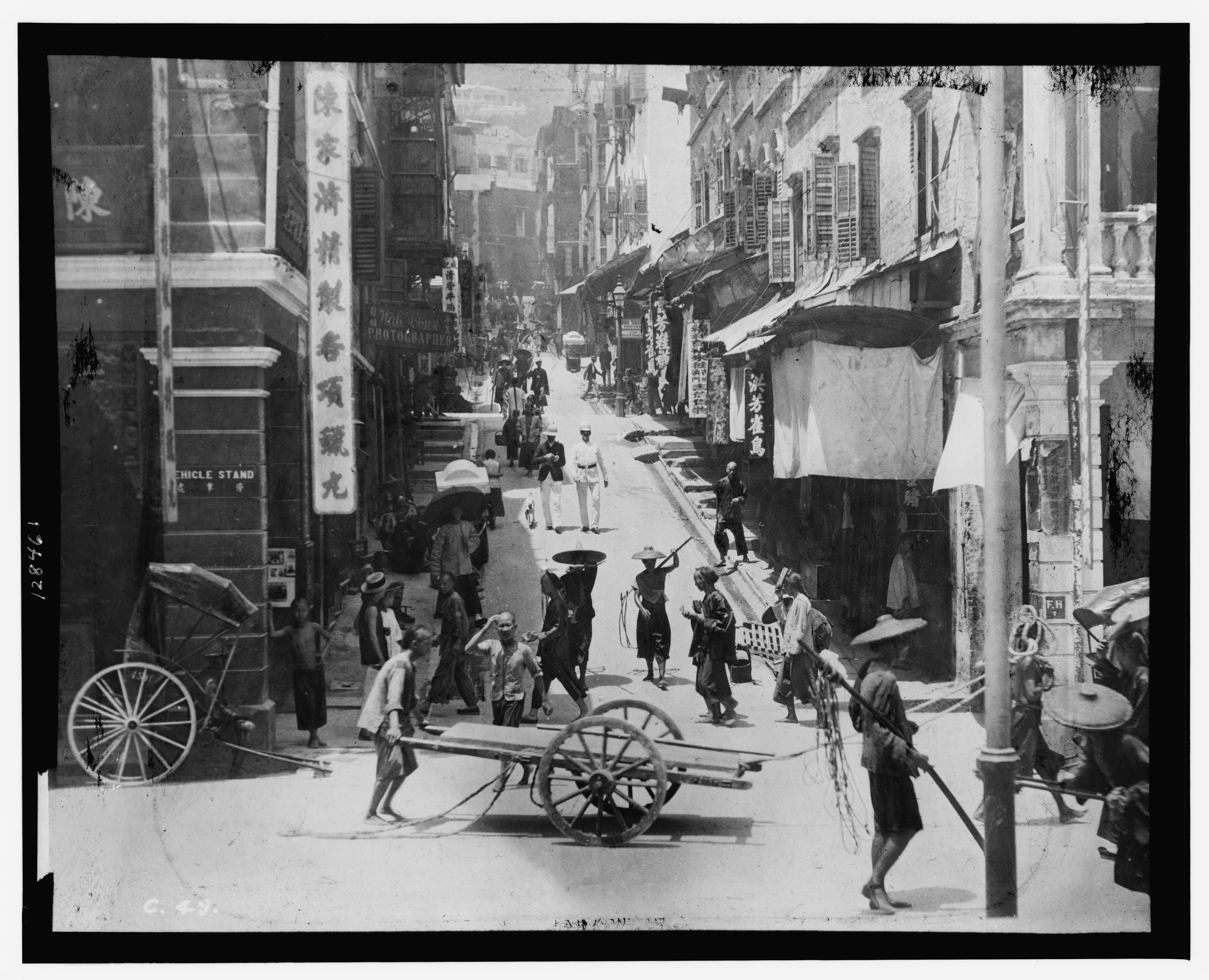
Intersection of Queen's Road Central and Cochrane Street in 1895. Photograph by William Henry Jackson.

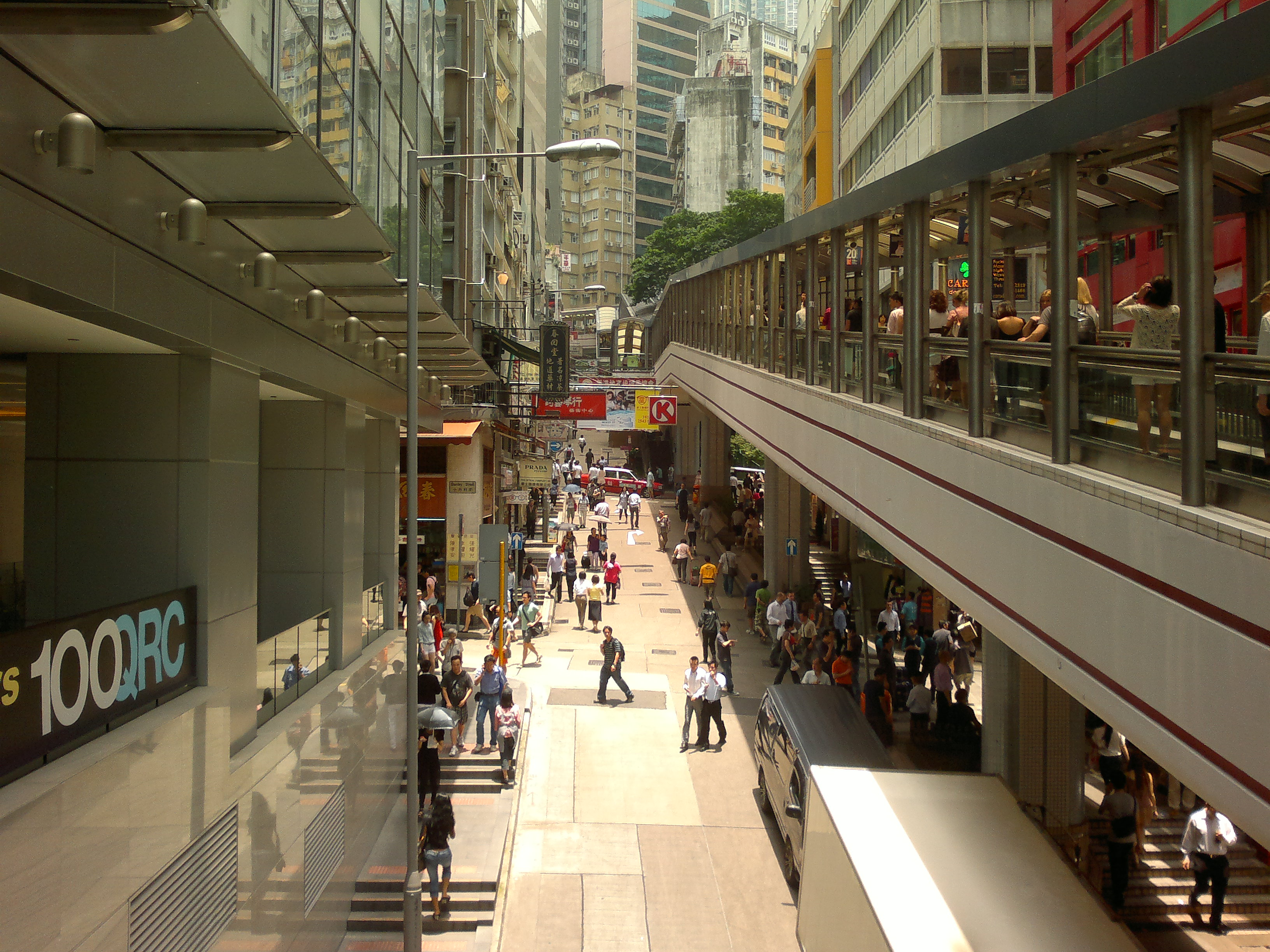
Cochrane Street near Stanley Street.

Cochrane Street (Chinese: 閣麟街; Cantonese Yale: gok3 leun4 gaai1) is a hilly street between Queen's Road Central and the junction with Gage Street and Lyndhurst Terrace in Central, Hong Kong. The Central–Mid-Levels escalators run along the entire length of the street.

== Name ==
The street is named after Thomas John Cochrane, a Royal Navy commander of the East Indies and China Station during the First Opium War. He later became its Commander-in-Chief following his promotion to the rank of Rear Admiral in November 1841.

== History ==
Cochrane Street was initially inhabited by Cantonese residents. Works were undertaken in 1844 under the Pottinger administration to improve the sanitary quality of the water supply. The Cantonese residents were later relocated to the Tai Ping Shan area.

At about 11pm on 14 August 1901, two houses at No. 32 and 34 Cochrane Street collapsed suddenly, claiming 43 lives.

== See also ==
- List of restaurant districts and streets
- List of streets and roads in Hong Kong
