= Wellington Street, Hong Kong =

Street in Central, Hong Kong

Wellington Street
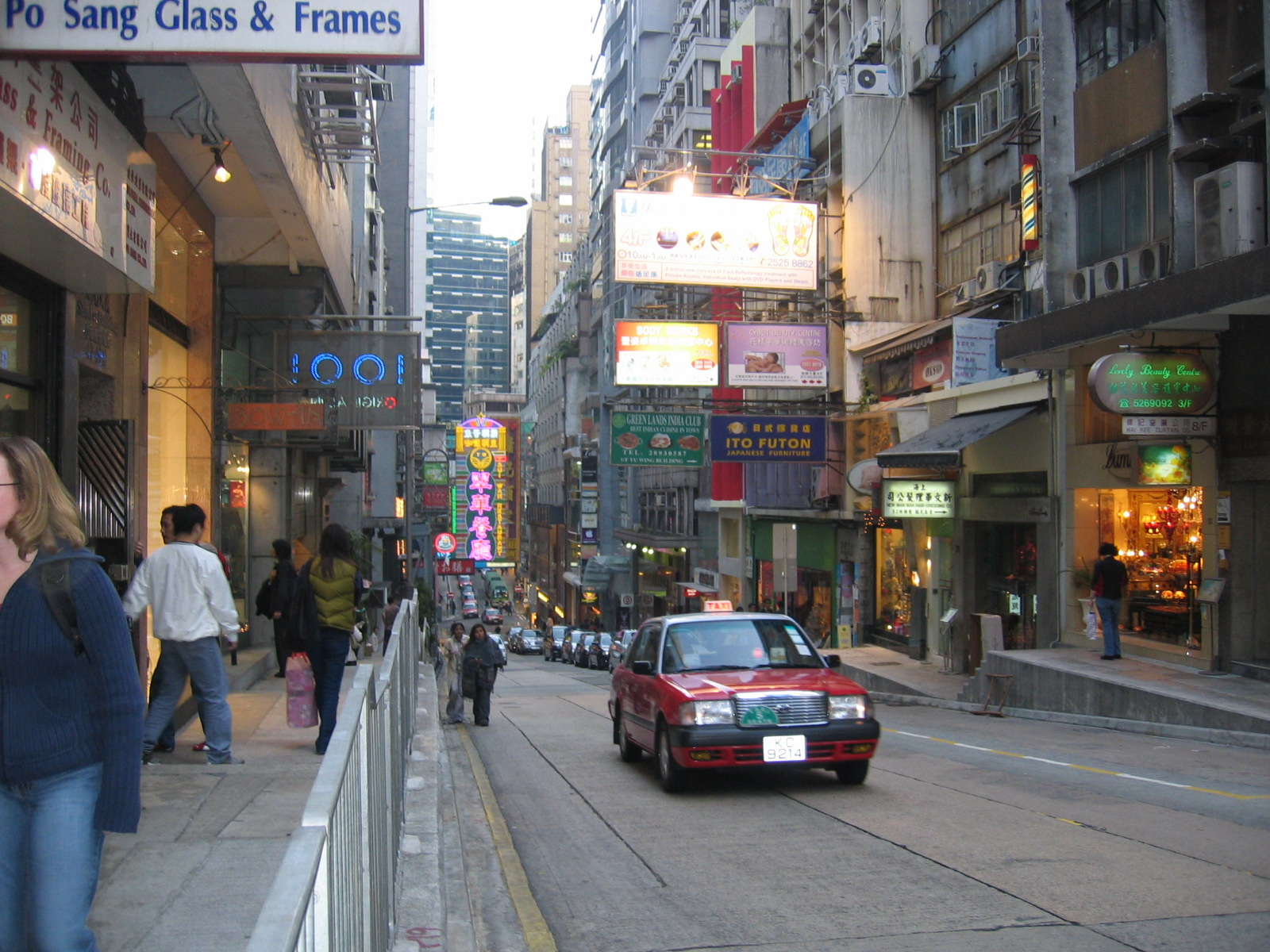
- The eastern part of Wellington Street
- Interactive map of Wellington Street
- Native name: 威靈頓街 (Yue Chinese)
- Namesake: Arthur Wellesley, 1st Duke of Wellington
- Location: Central, Hong Kong
- Coordinates: 22.28180°N 114.15550°E
- East end: Wyndham Street
- West end: Queen's Road Central

Construction
- Completed: c. mid-1840s

Wellington Street
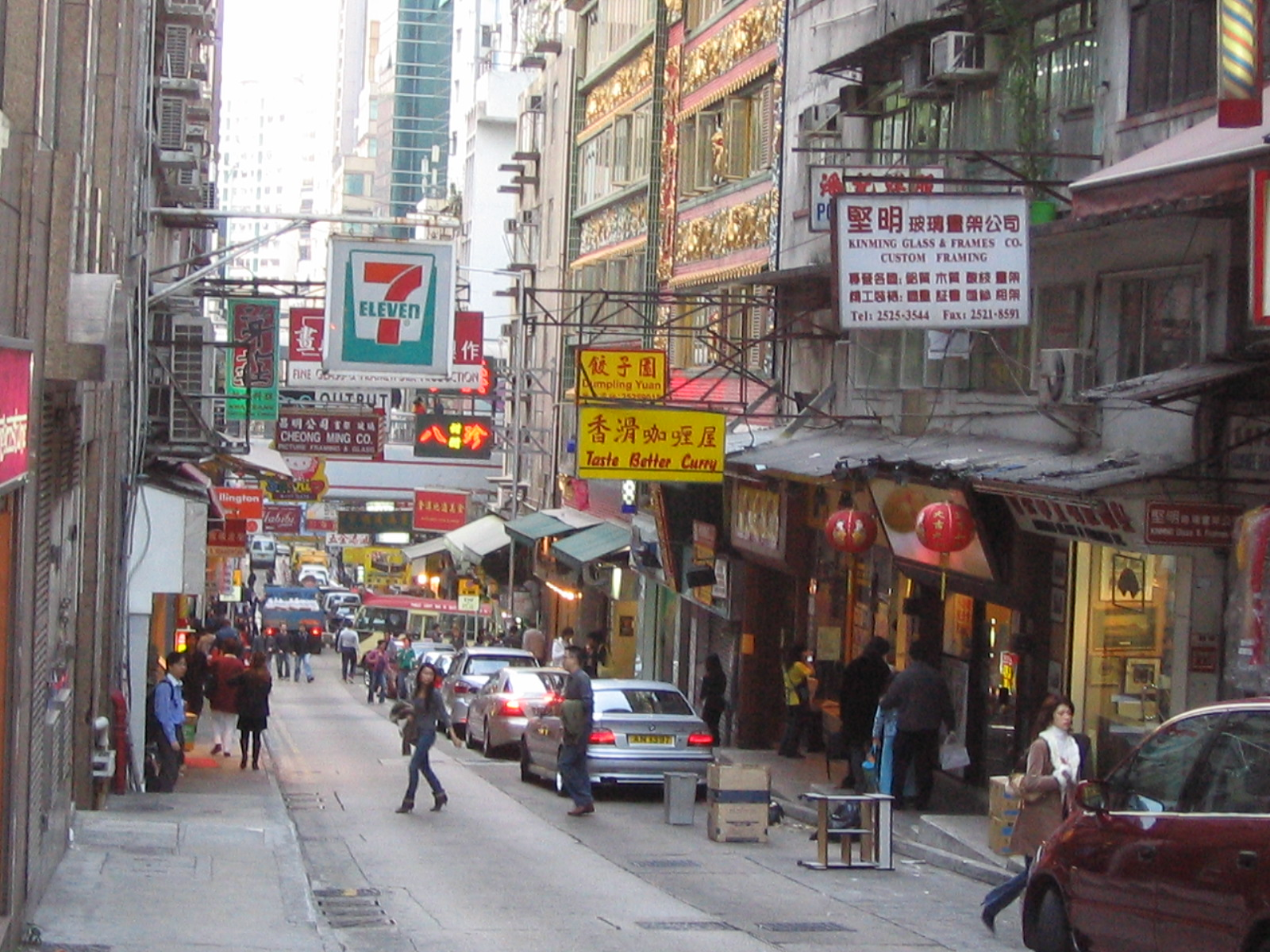
- Looking west from the junction with Lyndhurst Terrace
- Traditional Chinese: 威靈頓街
- Simplified Chinese: 威灵顿街
Transcriptions
Standard Mandarin
- Hanyu Pinyin: Wēilíngdùn Jiē
Yue: Cantonese
- Jyutping: wai1 ling4 deon6 gaai1

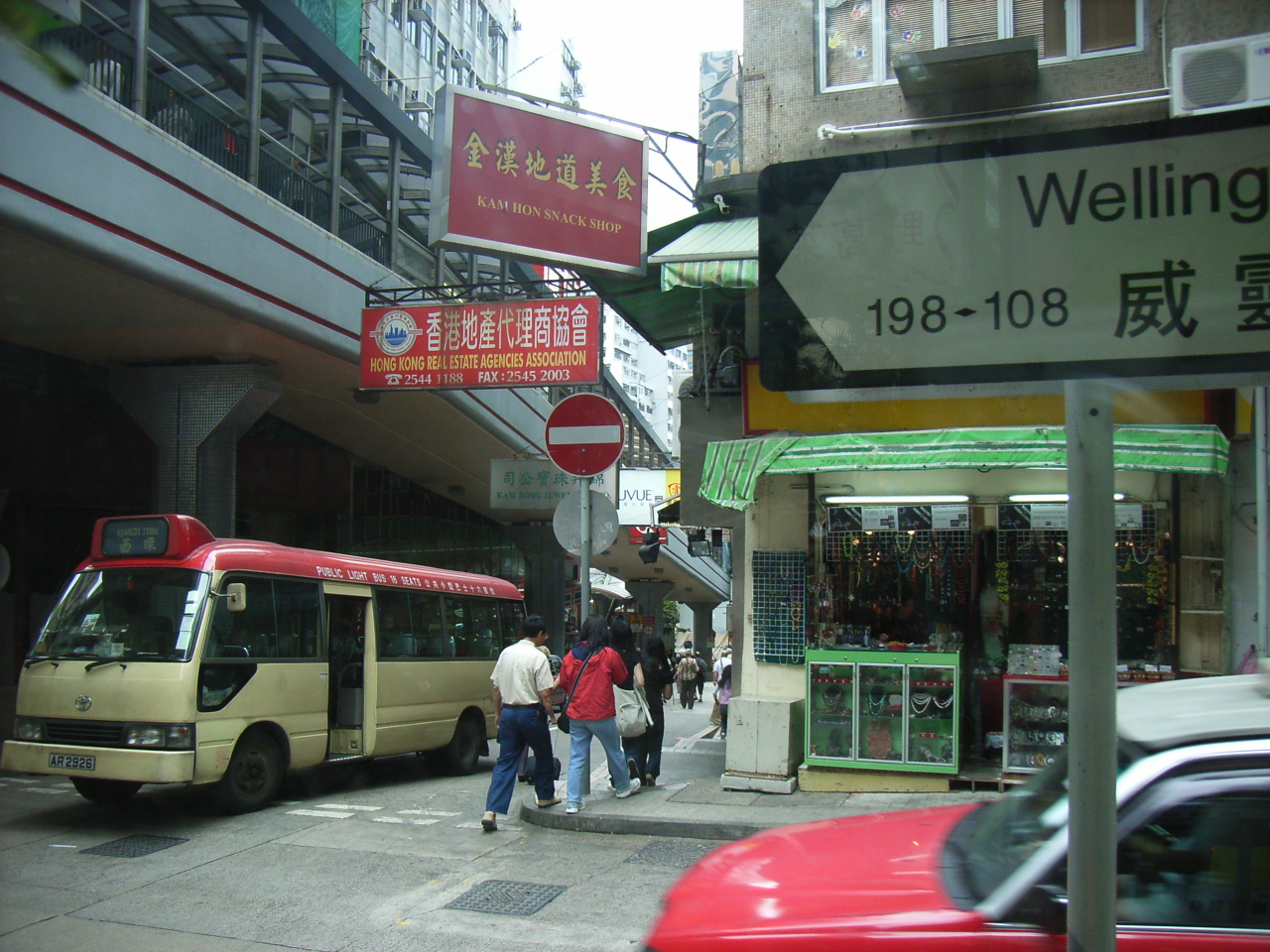
The Central–Mid-Levels escalators crossing Wellington Street.

Wellington Street (Chinese: 威靈頓街) is a one-way street located in Central and Sheung Wan, Hong Kong. Named after Arthur Wellesley, 1st Duke of Wellington, it stretches from Wyndham Street to Queen's Road Central. The two sides of the street are a mosaic of old and new buildings. A potpourri of trades are located at street level, whilst the upper floors contain a mixture of offices and private apartments. Street markets can be found in the adjacent lanes.

== Location ==
The street is located at the bottom of Victoria Peak on Hong Kong Island, next to Queen's Road Central which serves as one of the main thoroughfares of the central business district. Wellington Street's western terminus is at the end of Central, and the beginning of Sheung Wan (the border between Central and Sheung Wan is marked by Aberdeen Street).

== History ==
The old Roman Catholic cathedral—the first Catholic church in Hong Kong—was built in 1843 at the junction of Pottinger Street and Wellington Street; it was destroyed in a fire in 1859. The cathedral was rebuilt with iconic twin steeples rising from its façade. However, space constraints led to a different site being selected in the 1880s; the new location was above Caine Road by the Glenealy Ravine. When construction of the Cathedral of the Immaculate Conception was completed 1888, the old Wellington Street cathedral was demolished.

Japanese prostitutes constituted the majority of Hong Kong's Japanese residents in the late 19th century; 13 licensed Japanese brothels, and 132 prostitutes Japanese prostitutes were recorded in Hong Kong in 1901. These brothels were initially located in Central, mostly on Hollywood Road, Stanley Street, and Wellington Street. They later moved to Wan Chai.

On the afternoon of 15 December 1941, during the Battle of Hong Kong, Japanese bombs hit the junction of Old Bailey Street and Caine Road, the junction of Pottinger Street and Hollywood Road, Wellington Street and the Central Police Station. The attack – which had been launched that day – was the start of a systematic bombardment of Hong Kong Island's north shore. North Point Power Station was severely damaged during the raids.

== Features ==
Notable eateries on Wellington Street include: Mak's Noodle, Yung Kee, Lin Heung Tea House and Tsui Wah Restaurant.

== See also ==
- List of streets and roads in Hong Kong
