= Tai Kwun =

Cultural centre in Central, Hong Kong

Coordinates: 22.2813°N 114.1540°E

- 大館
- Former names: Central Police Station Compound

General information
- Status: Declared monument
- Location: 10 Hollywood Road, Central, Hong Kong
- Completed: 1925; 101 years ago
- Renovated: 2018; 8 years ago
- Renovation cost: HK$3.7 billion
- Owner: Hong Kong Jockey Club (conservation and revitalisation)

Design and construction
- Architecture firm: Herzog & de Meuron (masterplanning); Rocco Design Architects (executive); Purcell (research and conservation)

Website
- taikwun.hk

Tai Kwun
- Traditional Chinese: 大館
- Simplified Chinese: 大馆
Transcriptions
Standard Mandarin
- Hanyu Pinyin: Dàguǎn
Yue: Cantonese
- Yale Romanization: Daaih-gún
- Jyutping: Daai6gun2

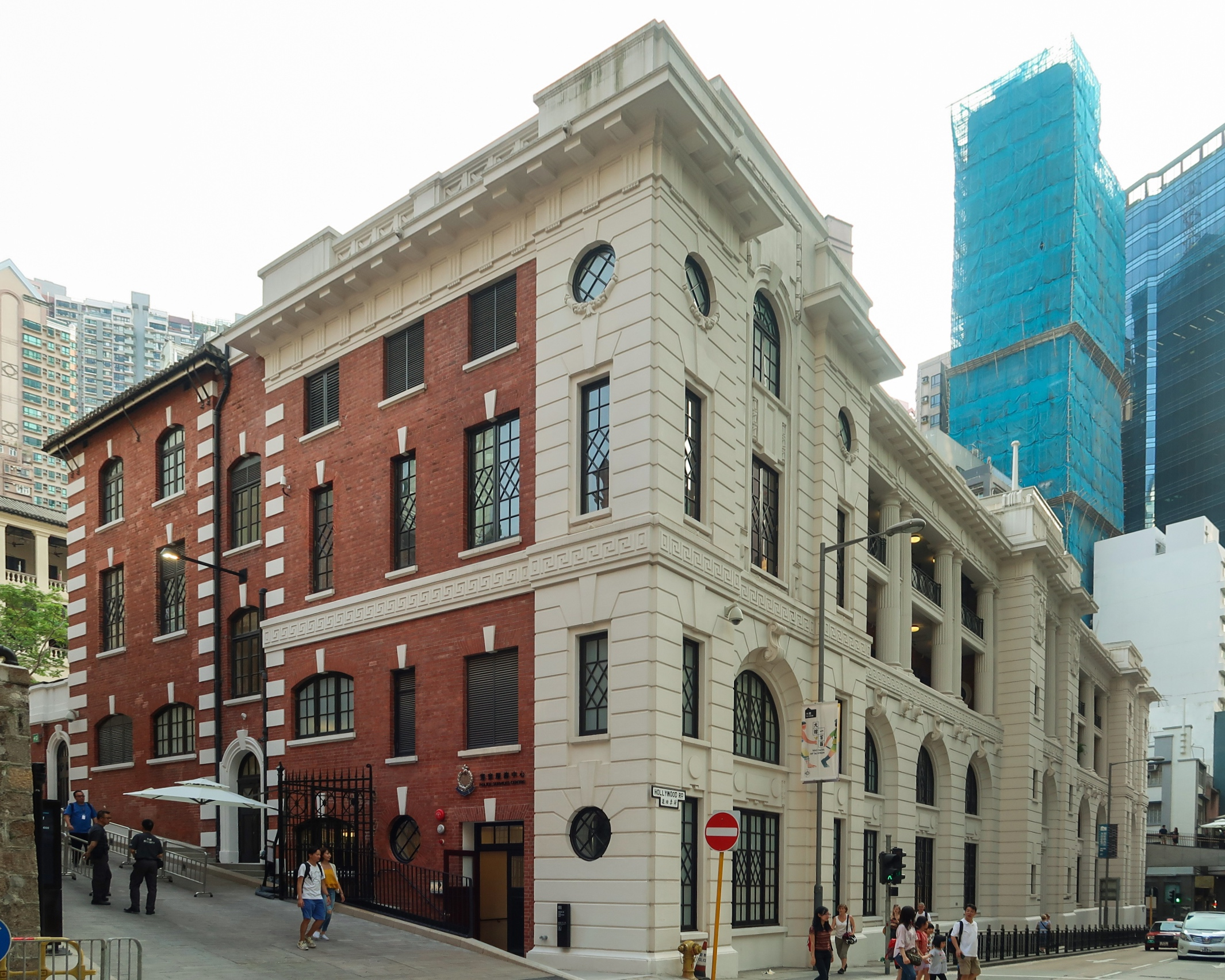
Tai Kwun police headquarters block

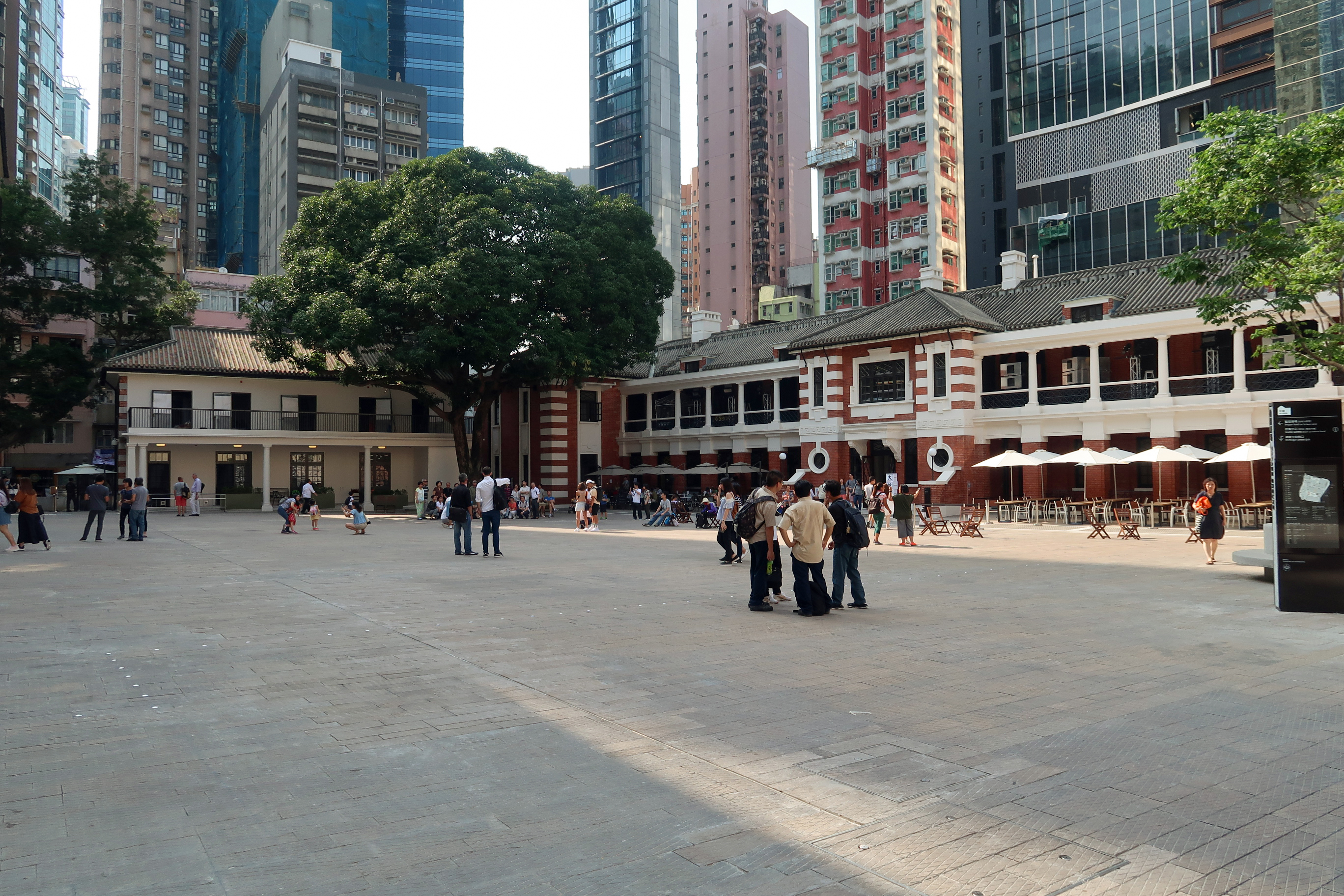
Parade ground

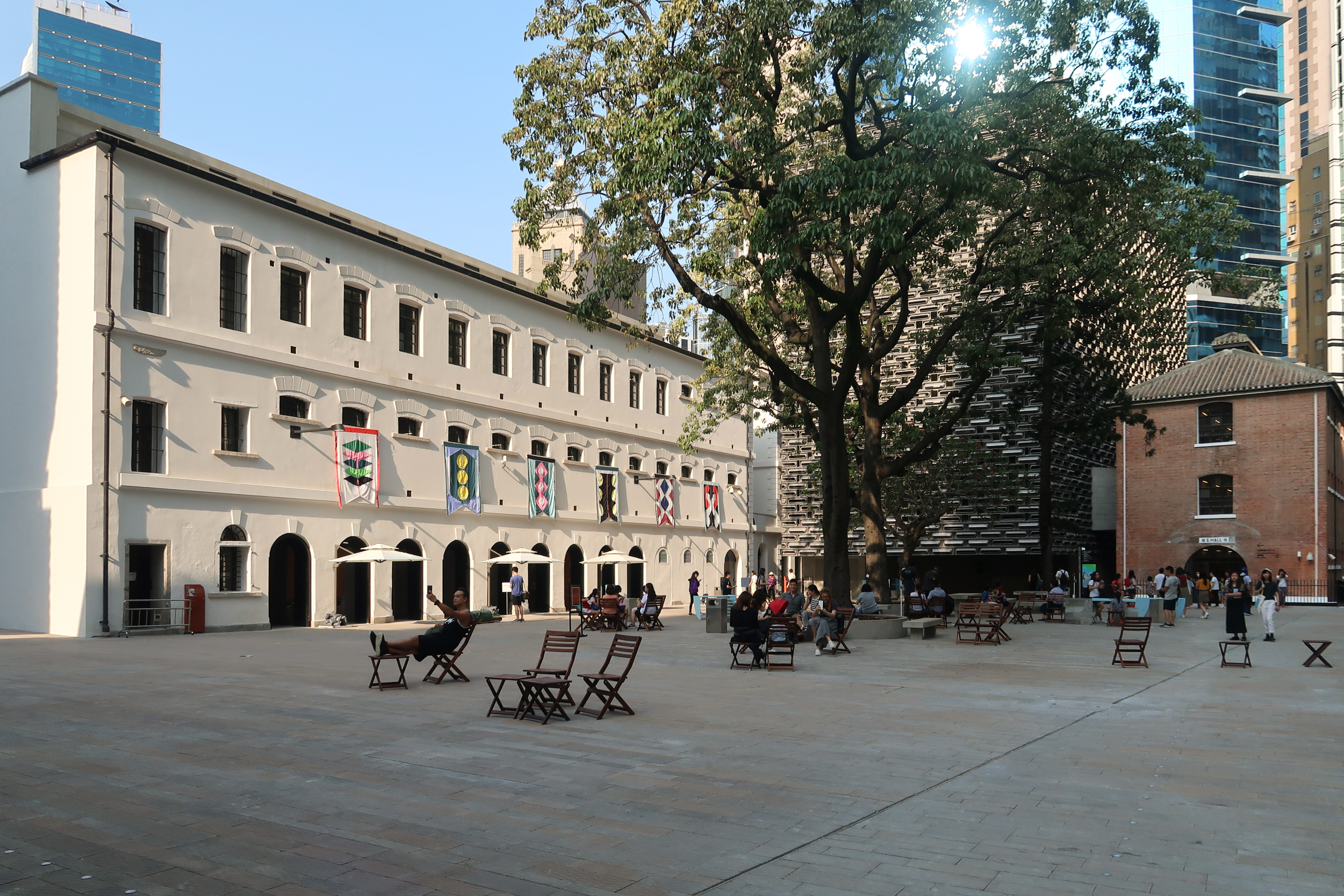
Prison yard

Tai Kwun, or the Former Central Police Station Compound (CPS Compound) includes three declared monuments in Central, Hong Kong: the former Central Police Station, the Former Central Magistracy, and the Victoria Prison. Surrounded by Hollywood Road, Arbuthnot Road, Chancery Lane, and Old Bailey Street, the compound underwent a heritage revitalisation and reopened to the public on 29 May 2018 as Tai Kwun (Chinese: 大館), a centre for heritage and arts.

== History ==
The Former Central Police Station Compound (FCPSC), built between 1841 and 1925, comprises 16 historic buildings grouped under the former Central Police Station, the Former Central Magistracy, and the Victoria Prison. Most of the city's historic colonial architecture had been bulldozed for development before the British government handed the territory back to China in 1997.

The first building in the FCPSC is the Magistrate's House, with jail blocks, which were built in 1841. In 1899, the former Central Prison was renamed Victoria Prison (or Victoria Gaol). The site underwent numerous expansions and reconstructions over the next century. In 1862, the number of prisoners increased to 650, and the government decided to develop the land nearby. The series of compounds hence formed Tai Kwun. Victoria Prison was decommissioned in 2006.

In 2008, the government of Hong Kong partnered with the Hong Kong Jockey Club to conserve and revitalise the complex, which turned into one of the most significant and expensive revitalisation projects in the territory, costing HK$1.8 billion; work began in 2011.

The conversion was completed in phases. Work faced a setback when a wall and roof collapsed in 2016. The Buildings Department prosecuted a subcontractor it deemed responsible for the accident, which was reportedly triggered by the failure of a brick pier that had been structurally undermined. Tai Kwun partially reopened to the public in May 2018.

== Tai Kwun ==
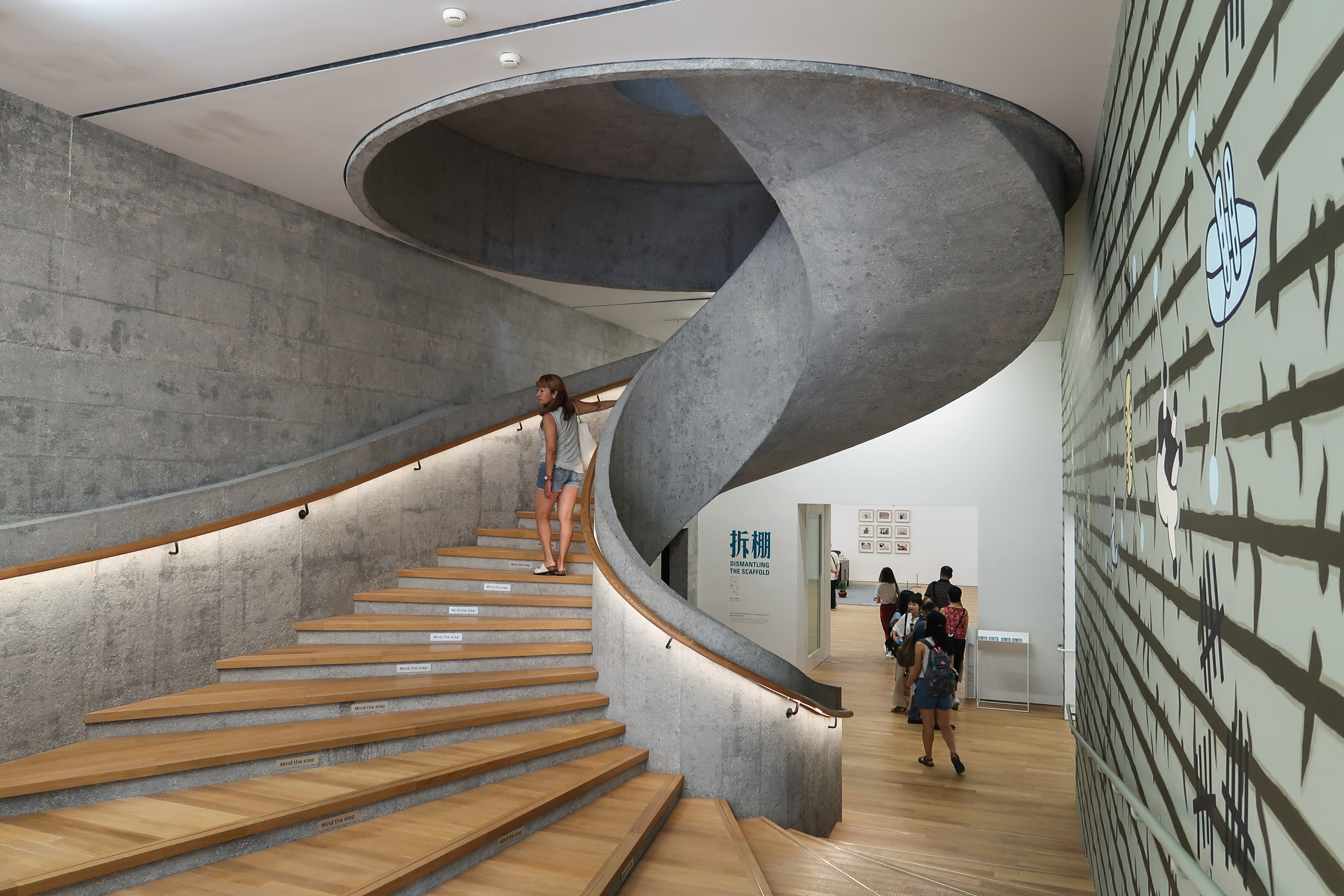
The JC Contemporary stairs are an iconic spot for visitors

A FCPSC revitalisation project was established to conserve and renovate the heritage site. Operated by the Hong Kong Jockey Club, it took eight years and cost HK$3.8 billion, or about US$480M in 2018.

Tai Kwun, named after the historical colloquial name of the compound, is a mix of heritage and contemporary architecture, with 16 heritage buildings having been restored. An additional two new buildings were constructed, featuring designs inspired by the site's historic brickwork.

The remodelled compound was opened to the public in three phases, beginning with the inaugural "100 Faces of Tai Kwun" exhibition, on 29 May 2018.

In 2018, Time magazine induced Tai Kwun in its "World's Greatest Places 2018" list.

In 2019, Tai Kwun received an award of excellence from the UNESCO Asia-Pacific Awards for Cultural Heritage Conservation.

== Gallery ==
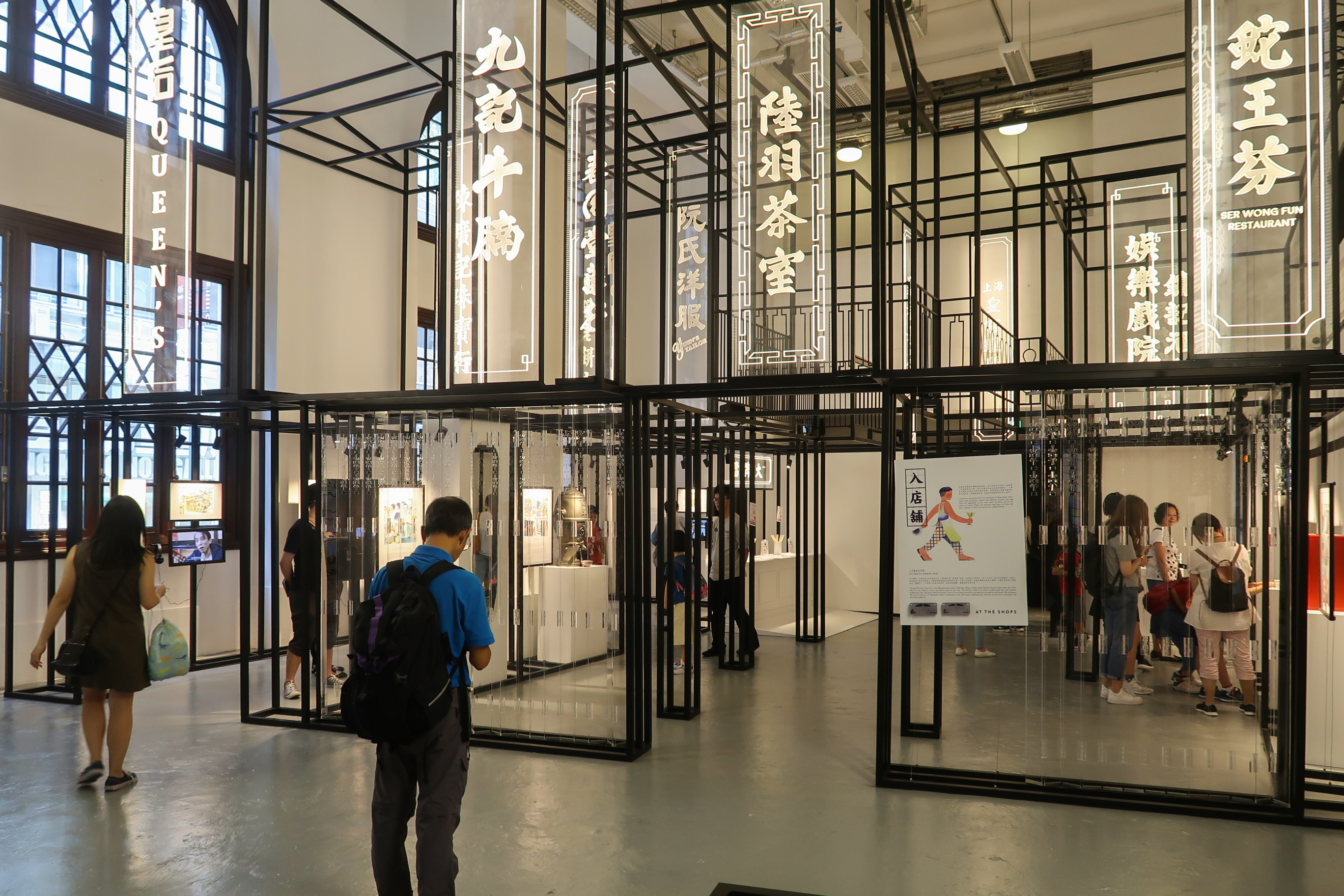
Tai Kwun duplex studio

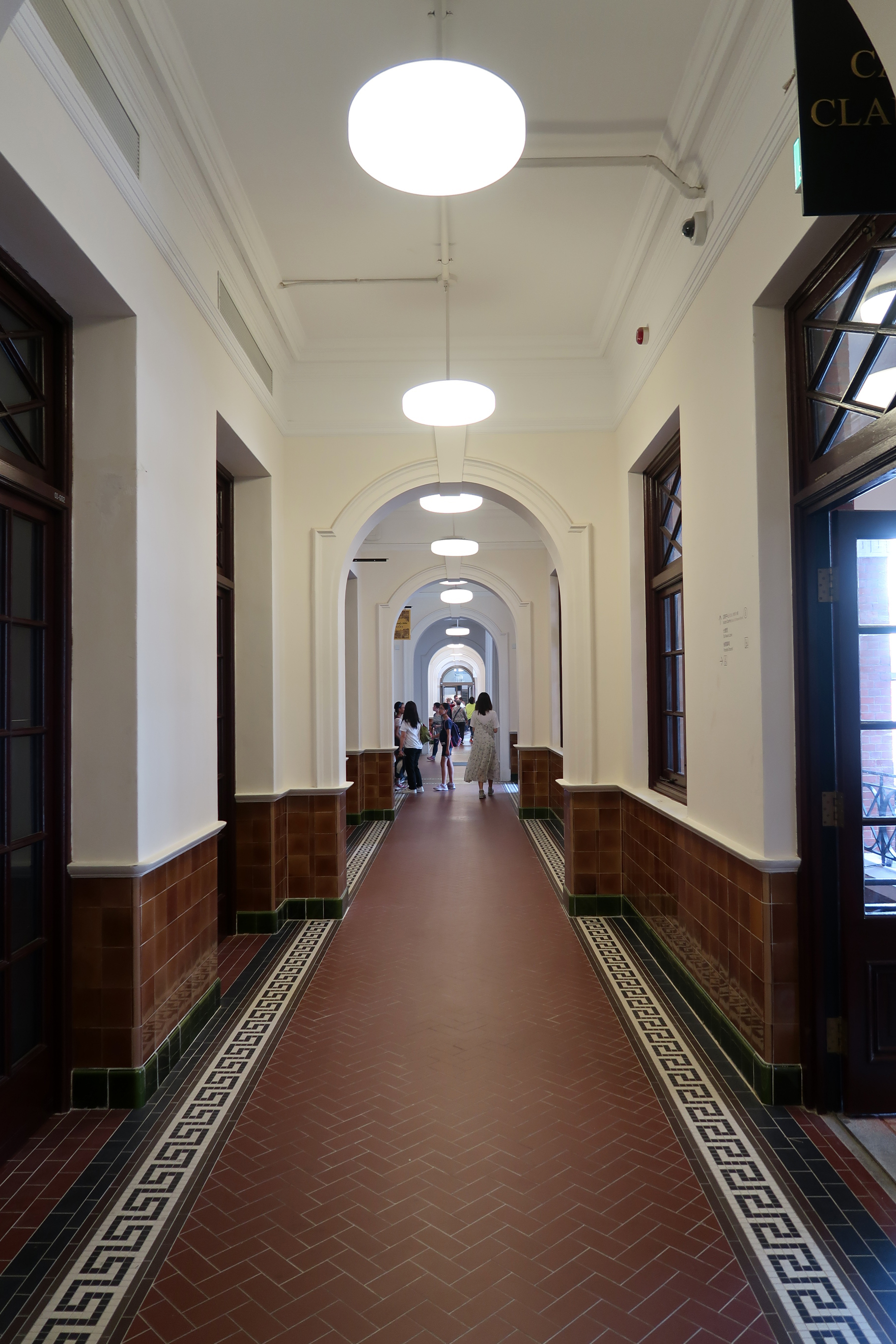
Police headquarters corridor

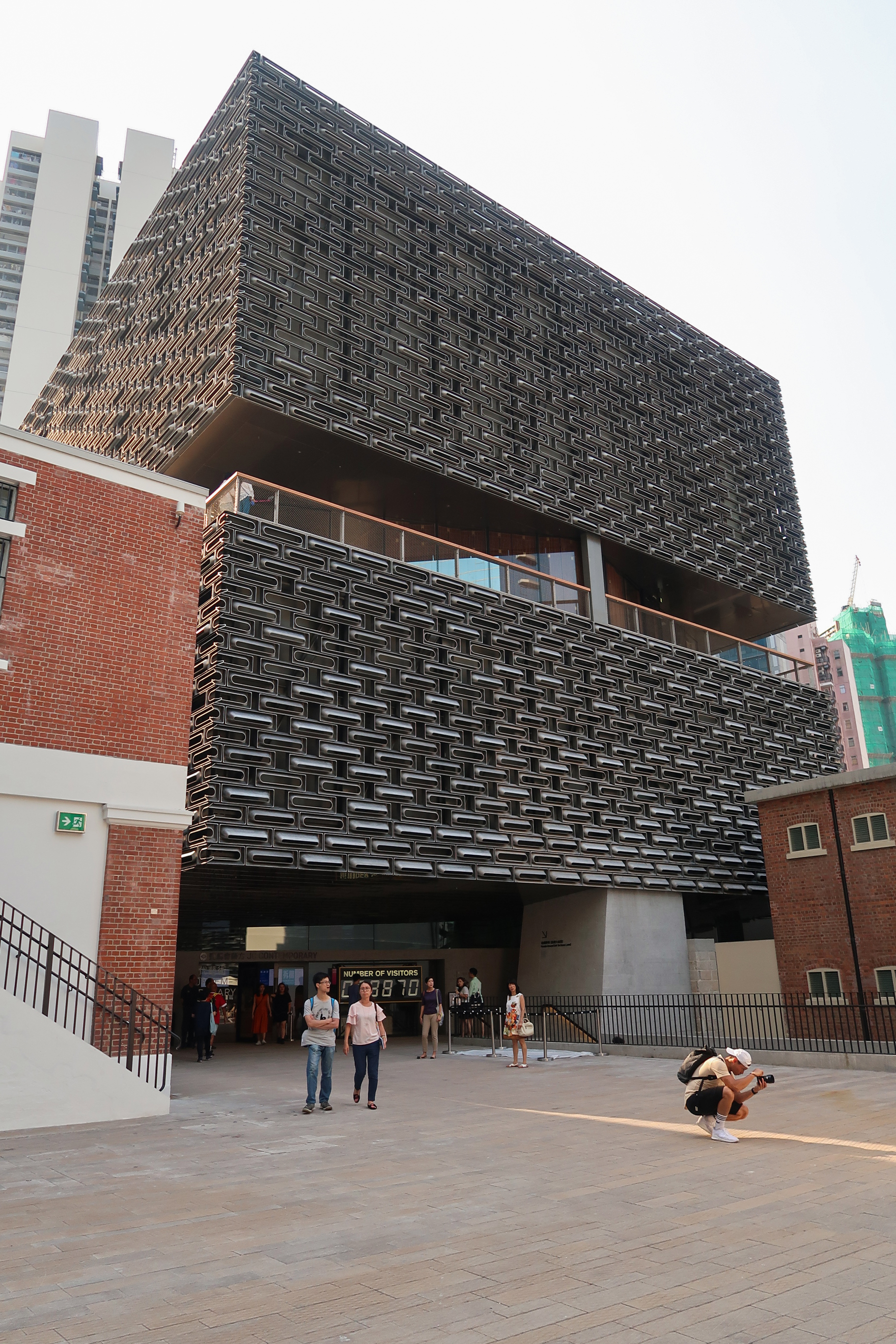
Exterior of JC Contemporary

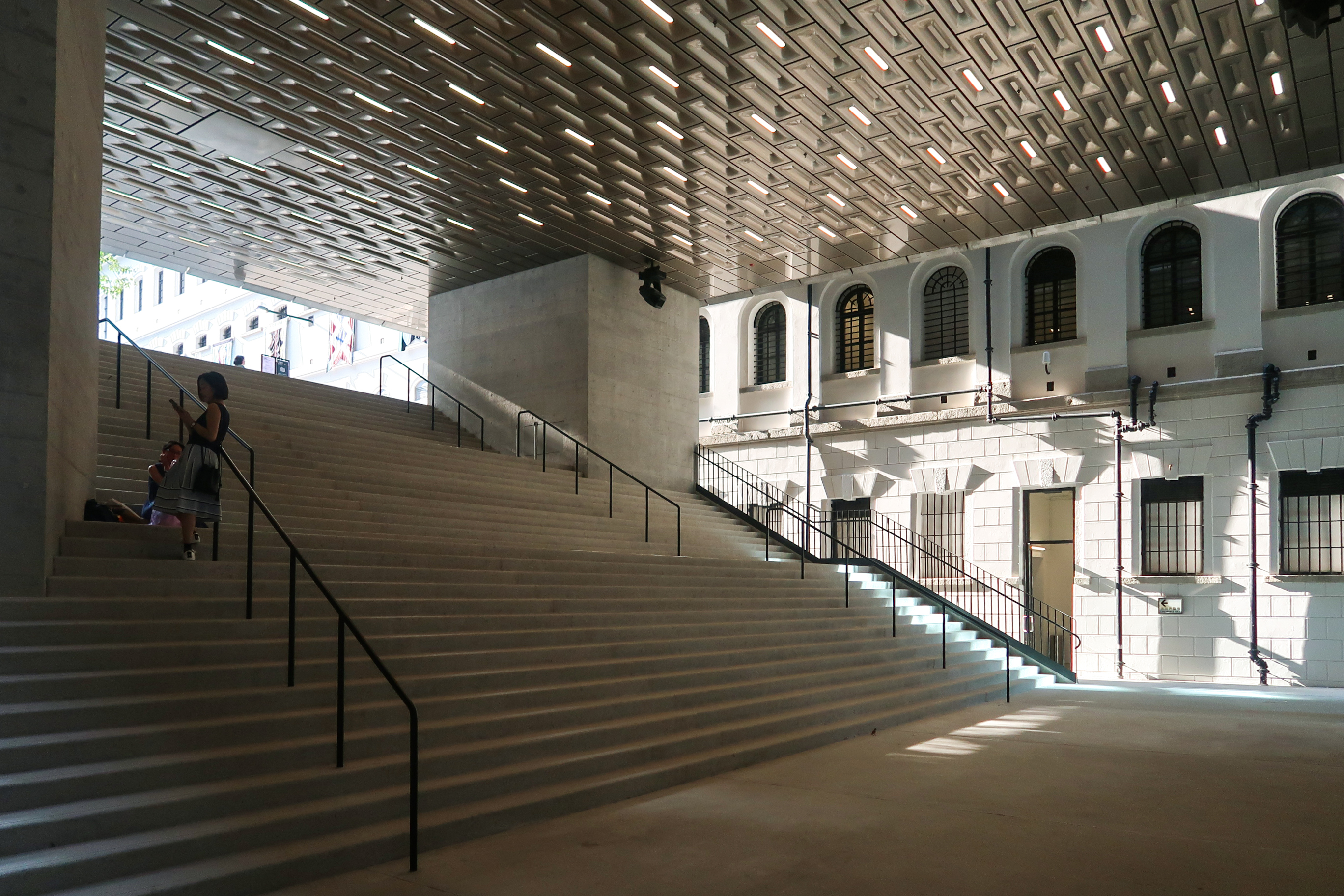
JC Cube laundry steps

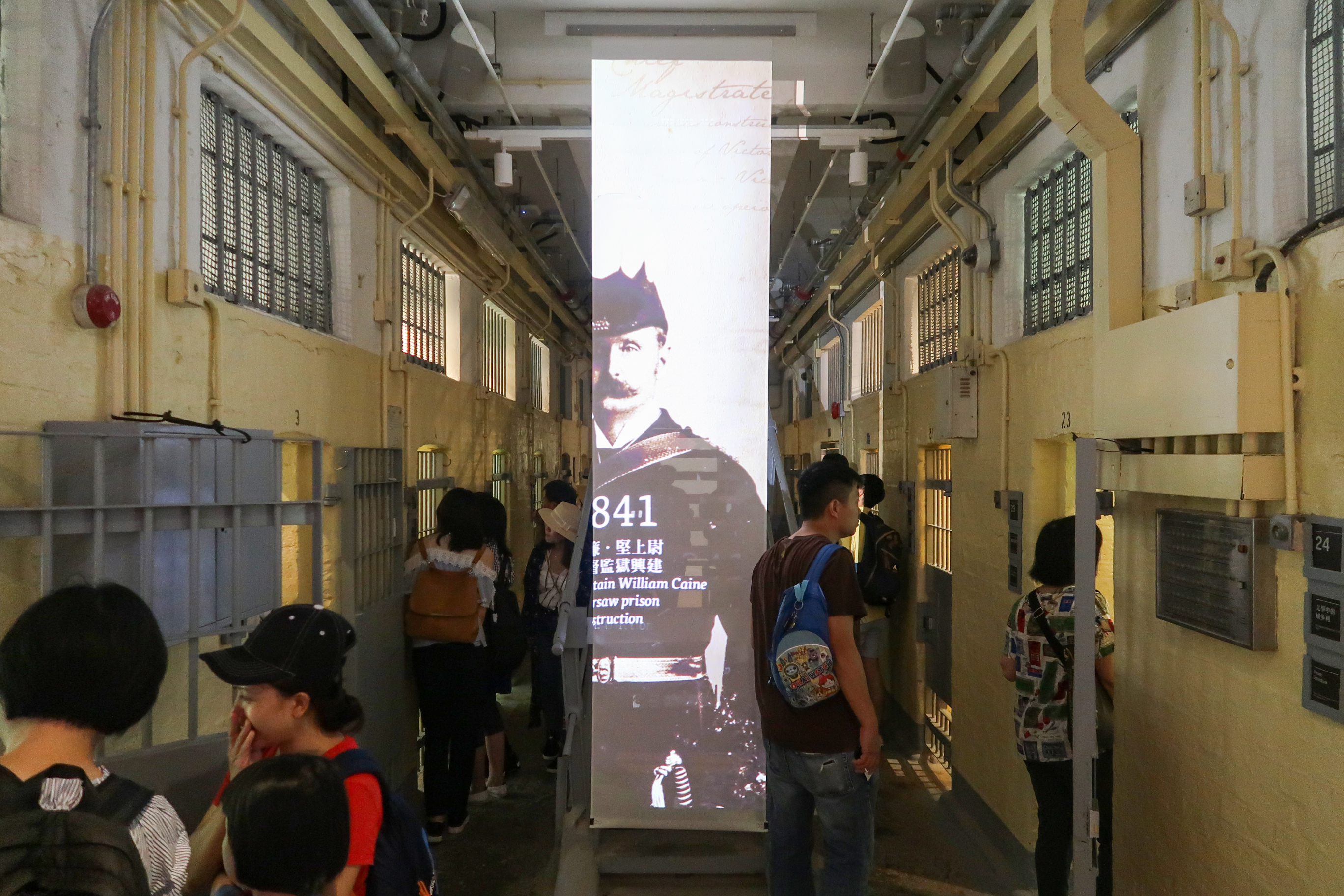
B Hall, Victoria Prison

== Awards ==
| Year | Award | Organiser |
|---|---|---|
| 2021 | Quality Building Award 2020 – Hong Kong Building (Renovation / Revitalization) – Grand Award | Quality Building Award |
| 2021 | ÉLAN Lost Child Project HK received an award for the promotion of the arts at the 15th HK Arts Development Awards | Hong Kong Arts Development Council |
| 2021 | ÉLAN Lost Child Project HK received the Featured Work of IATC (HK) Critics Awards 2020 | International Association of Theatre Critics (Hong Kong) |
| 2021 | RIBA International Awards for Excellence 2021 | The Royal Institute of British Architects |
| 2020 | MURAKAMI vs MURAKAMI received the Excellence in Lifestyle & Entertainment Marketing – Gold Award at the Marketing Excellence Awards 2020 | Marketing Magazine |
| 2020 | SHIFTING by Knowledge Transfer: An Edible Performance received the Good Design Award 2020 (Category: Awareness improvement for individual and public) | Japan Institute of Design Promotion |
| 2020 | ICE Awards 2020: Brunel Medal – Highly Commended | Institution of Civil Engineers |
| 2020 | HKICON Conservation Award 2019 – Revitalisation Category | The Hong Kong Institute of Architectural Conservationists |
| 2020 | Projekt Berlin received the Best Event Production – Gold Award at the Marketing Events Awards 2020 | Marketing Magazine |
| 2020 | Projekt Berlin received the Best Culture Event – Bronze Award at the Marketing Events Awards 2020 | Marketing Magazine |
| 2020 | Manpower Developers of ERB Manpower Developer Award Scheme 2020–2022 | Employees Retraining Board |
| 2019 | Award of Excellence, UNESCO Asia-Pacific Awards for Cultural Heritage Conservation | UNESCO Asia-Pacific Awards for Cultural Heritage Conservation |
| 2019 | One of the Top 10 Museums and Cultural Venues of 2019 | Designboom magazine |
| 2019 | MURAKAMI vs MURAKAMI was named one of the Top 10 Art Exhibitions in 2019 | Designboom magazine |
| 2019 | Marco Polo Club Members' Choice Awards 2019 – Best Hong Kong Arts Venue | Marco Polo Club |
| 2019 | HKIA Annual Awards 2018/2019 Special Architectural Award: Heritage & Adaptive Re-use | Hong Kong Institute of Architects |
| 2019 | HKIA Annual Awards 2018/2019 HKIA Merit Award of Hong Kong – Mixed Use(es) Building | Hong Kong Institute of Architects |
| 2019 | HKICON Conservation Award 2018 – Interpretation Category | The Hong Kong Institute of Architectural Conservationists |
| 2019 | Structural Excellence Awards 2019 Grand Award | The Hong Kong Institution of Engineers |
| 2019 | Fire Engineering Excellence Award 2019 | The Hong Kong Institution of Engineers |
| 2019 | Tai Kwun Opening Season received the HKDA Global Design Awards 2018 — Excellence Award on Visual Identity System | Hong Kong Designers Association |
| 2019 | 100 Faces of Tai Kwun received the 2019 FRAME Awards – Social Award (People's Choice) | FRAME Awards |
| 2019 | Prison Architect, a film commissioned by Tai Kwun, was selected for the Berlin International Film Festival | Berlinale 2019 (the 69th Berlin International Film Festival) |
| 2019 | Tai Kwun Dance Season won Outstanding Small Venue Production at 2019 Hong Kong Dance Awards (Tai Kwun and Joseph Lee, Rebecca Wong, KT Yau Ka-hei) | Hong Kong Dance Alliance |
| 2019 | Tai Kwun Dance Season was awarded Outstanding Services to Dance at the 2019 Hong Kong Dance Awards | Hong Kong Dance Alliance |
| 2018 | One of the World's 100 Greatest Places 2018 | Time magazine |
| 2018 | New Cultural Destination of the Year – APAC | Leading Cultural Destinations Awards 2018 |
| 2018 | Grand Award, DFA Design for Asia Awards 2018 | Hong Kong Design Centre |
| 2018 | 100 Faces of Tai Kwun received the Merit Award, DFA Design for Asia Awards 2018 | Hong Kong Design Centre |
| 2018 | AIA Hong Kong Citation 2018 | American Institute of Architects Hong Kong Chapter |
