= Central Police Station (Hong Kong) =

Group of declared monuments in Hong Kong

Coordinates: 22.28174°N 114.154196°E

- 中區警署
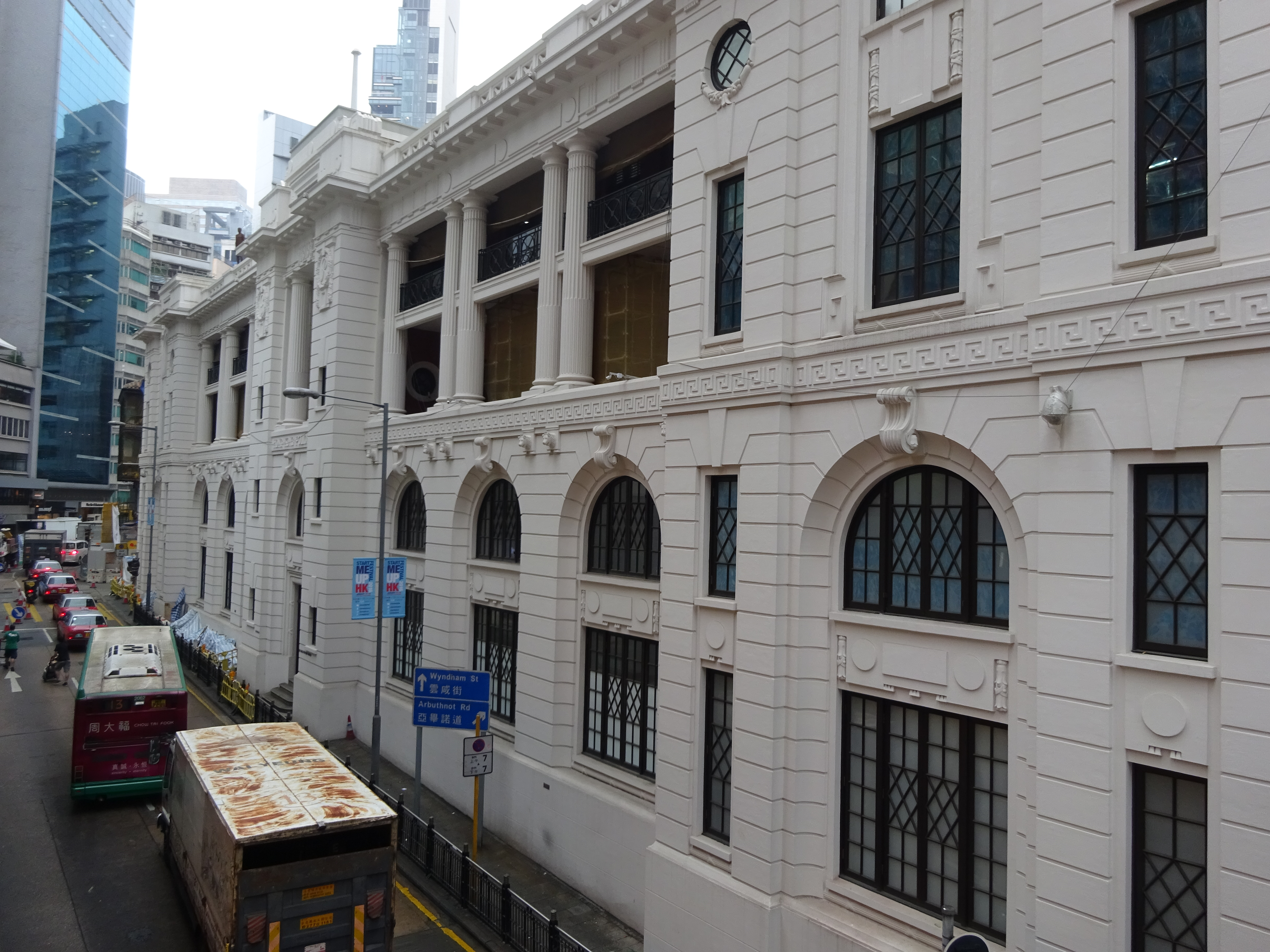
- Former Central Police Station, Hong Kong in 2016.
- Interactive map of Central Police Station
- Location: 10 Hollywood Road, Central, Hong Kong
- Type: Police Station
- Completion date: 1864; 162 years ago
- Restored date: 2011 - 2018
- Website: Official Website

Central Police Station
- Traditional Chinese: 中區警署
- Simplified Chinese: 中区警署
Transcriptions
Standard Mandarin
- Hanyu Pinyin: Zhōngqū Jǐngshǔ
Yue: Cantonese
- Yale Romanization: Jūng kēui gíng chyúh
- Jyutping: Zung^{1} keoi^{1} ging^{2} cyu^{5}

The former Central Police Station of Hong Kong is located at the eastern end of Hollywood Road, in Central, Hong Kong. It has been redeveloped into a cultural and shopping destination generally called Tai Kwun (大館). Tai Kwun is composed of three declared monuments: the former Central Police Station, former Central Magistracy and Victoria Prison.

== History ==
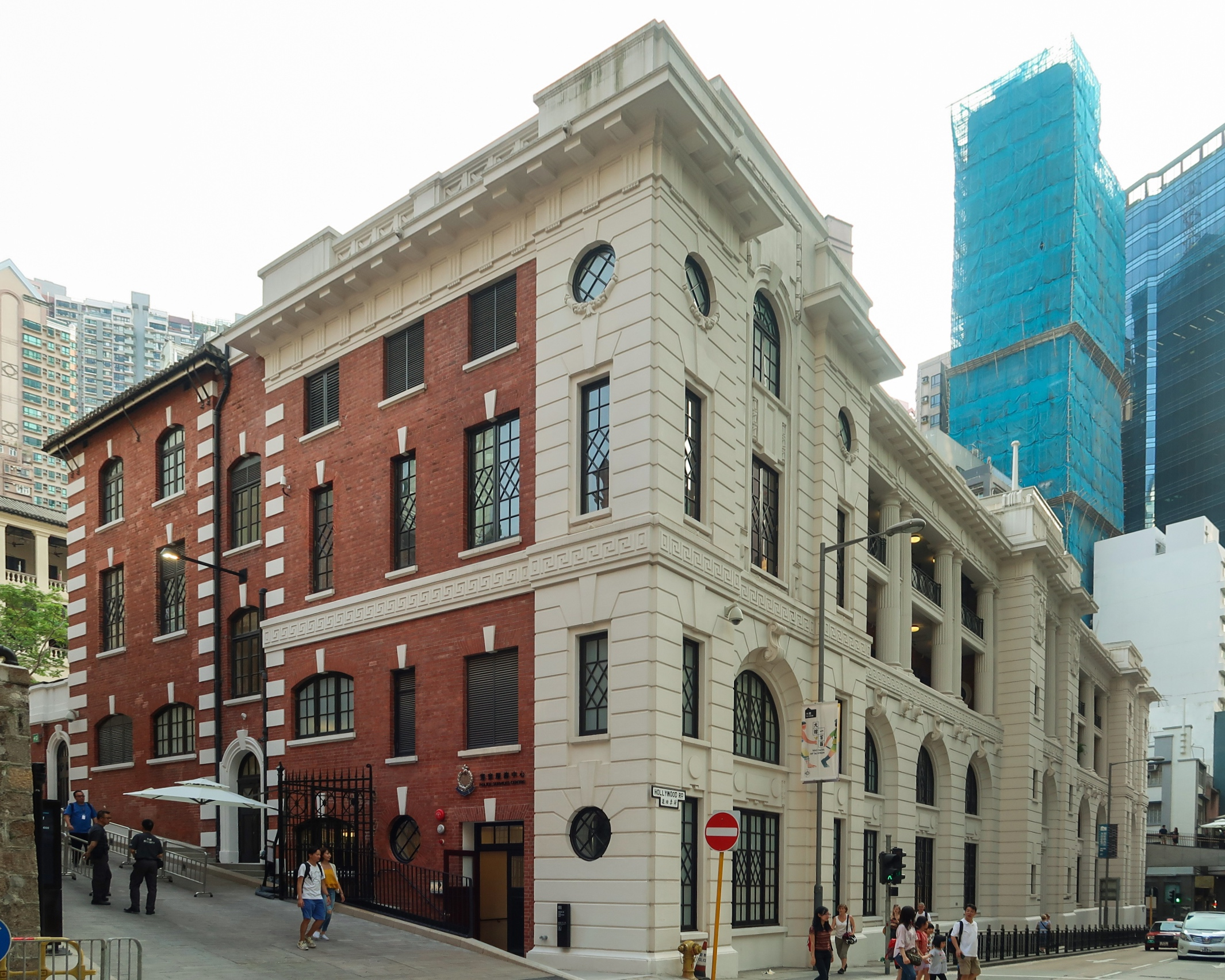
Vehicle entrance into the Central Police Station, viewed from Hollywood Road.

The oldest structure within the police station was built in 1864; a three-storey barrack block constructed adjacent to Victoria Prison. A storey was later added to the block in 1905. Other blocks were added between 1910 and 1925. In 1919, Headquarters Block facing Hollywood Road was constructed. Subsequently, in 1925, the two-storey Stable Block was constructed at the north-west end of the parade ground and later used as an armoury.

Many police stations were built during this period due to the large number of people who moved to Hong Kong from mainland China and the corresponding need to maintain law and order.

In the afternoon of 15 December 1941, during the Battle of Hong Kong, a stick Japanese bombs hit the junction of Old Bailey Street and Caine Road, the junction of Pottinger Street and Hollywood Road, Wellington Street and the Central Police Station. The ground floor and the basement offices of Police Headquarters were destroyed, causing casualties. The bombing was part of a systematic bombardment of the Hong Kong Island's north shore that was launched on that day.

In the past, the police station was used as the headquarters of the police; however, its importance declined when the new police headquarters was built in Wan Chai after World War II. It functioned as a police station, dormitory, and prison, and was used as both the Hong Kong Island Regional Police Headquarters and the Central District Police Headquarters until the 2000s.

== Buildings ==
The former Central Police Station comprises seven buildings:

Building	Constructed
Police Headquarters Block	1919
Armoury	1924
Married Inspectors' Quarters	1862-1864
Married Sergeants' Quarters	1900-1903
Single Inspectors' Quarters	1900-1903
Ablutions Block	1930
Barrack Block	1862-1864

The compound is bordered on the North by Hollywood Road, on the South by Chancery Lane, on the East by Arbuthnot Road and on the West by Old Bailey Street.

== Conservation status ==
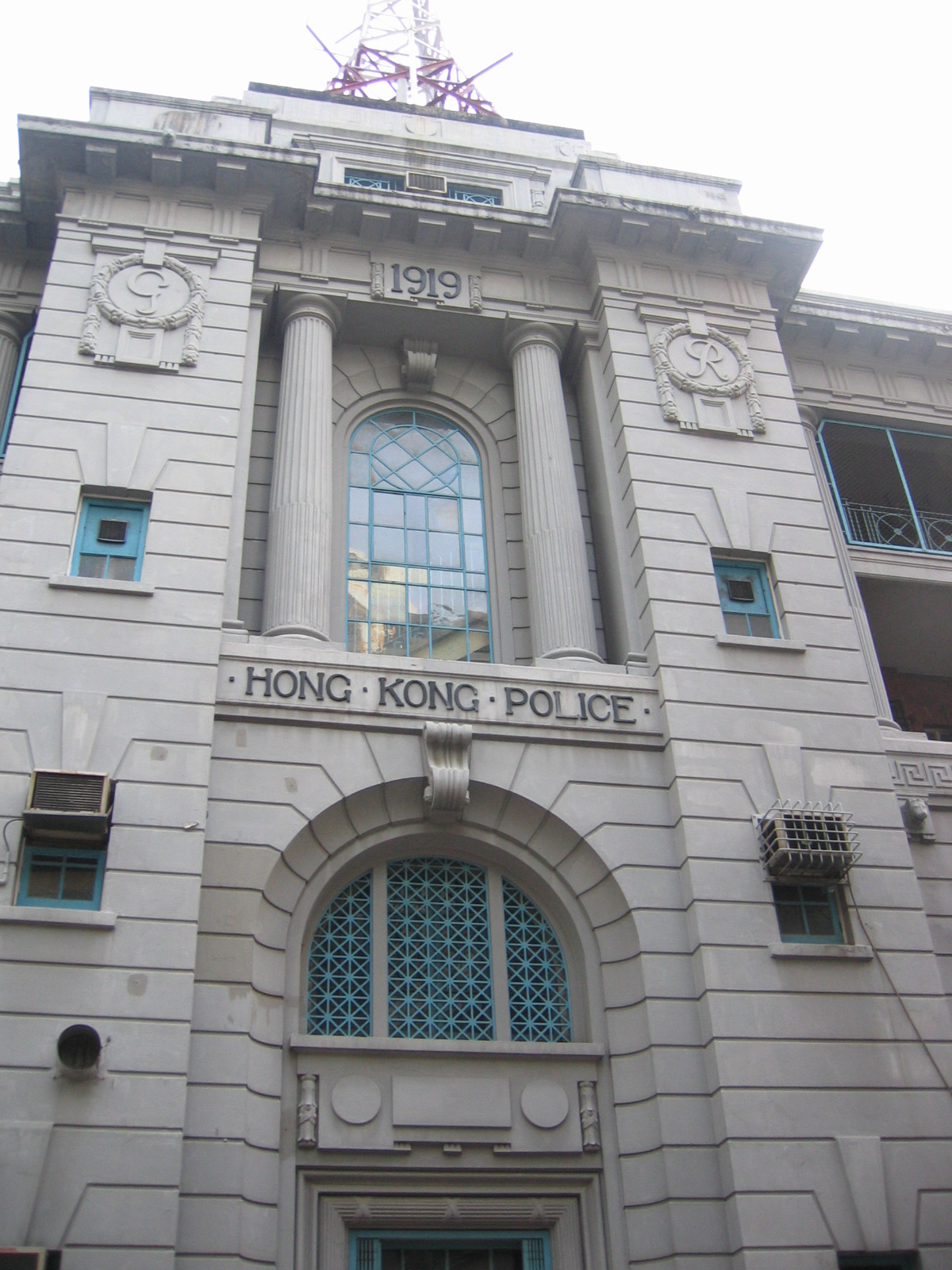
The letters "G" and "R" above the entrance to the police station is a symbol of George V of the United Kingdom.

With its long history and antiquated architectural style, the Central Police Station is one of the last physical reminders of Hong Kong's colonial heritage.

The Central Police Station has undergone reconstruction to convert it and the former Central Magistracy to more public use; including food outlets, museums, and art galleries. By adaptive reuse, the renovated police station compound is intended to become a tourist destination with historical significance, a rarity amongst Hong Kong attractions. The restoration work was conducted by the Hong Kong Jockey Club, which now manages the facility.

The former Central Police Station, the Victoria Prison, and the former Central Magistracy are declared monuments of Hong Kong. These buildings are collectively referred to as "Tai Kwun".

The restored facility reopened in May 2018.

In 2019, the revitalised and rebranded building Tai Kwun won the Award of Excellence of the United Nations Educational, Scientific and Cultural Organization (UNESCO) Asia-Pacific Awards for Cultural Heritage Conservation.

== Revitalisation ==
Suggested by property developer Swire Properties in 1999, the Economic Development and Labour Bureau called for private sector bidding to convert the building compound into a retail and entertainment complex in 2003. The proposal of commercial project received heavy public criticism. Many compared the initiative with the controversial revitalization of the former Marine Police Headquarters in Tsim Sha Tsui. The plan was eventually shelved in 2004.

On 20 October 2010, Hong Kong Jockey Club announced that a heritage-led plan to conserve and revitalise the CPS and transform it into a centre of heritage, arts and leisure. The Hong Kong Jockey Club Charities Trust agreed to provide the capital cost of the revitalisation of the CPS. As a not-for-profit organisation, the Trust does not expect an investment return.

Herzog & de Meuron, Purcell and Rocco Design collaborated and examined many different alternative schemes in order to establish the best design for adaptive re-use. Given the physical constraints of the site, two new buildings have been added: the "Old Bailey Galleries", and "Arbuthnot Auditorium".

In addition to the existing public entrance at Pottinger Gate, an Old Bailey Gate, an Arbuthnot Gate, and a footbridge connection to the Mid-Levels Escalator have been constructed to allow access to the site. Stairs and lifts facilitate pedestrian connectivity between the upper courtyard near Chancery Lane and lower courtyard near Hollywood Road, and between SoHo and Lan Kwai Fong.

In 2016, during the ongoing revitalisation, part of the married inspectors' quarters, which was built in 1864, collapsed; nobody was injured.

The site was opened by Carrie Lam, Hong Kong's Chief Executive, on 25 May 2018 In her opening speech, Ms Lam praised the work of the design architect Herzog & de Meuron, the conservation expert Michael Morrison, the executive architect Rocco Design Architects, and the Project Director Mike Moir.

== See also ==
- Central and Western Heritage Trail
- Heritage conservation in Hong Kong
- Historic police station buildings in Hong Kong
