= Old Bailey Street =

Street in Central, Hong Kong

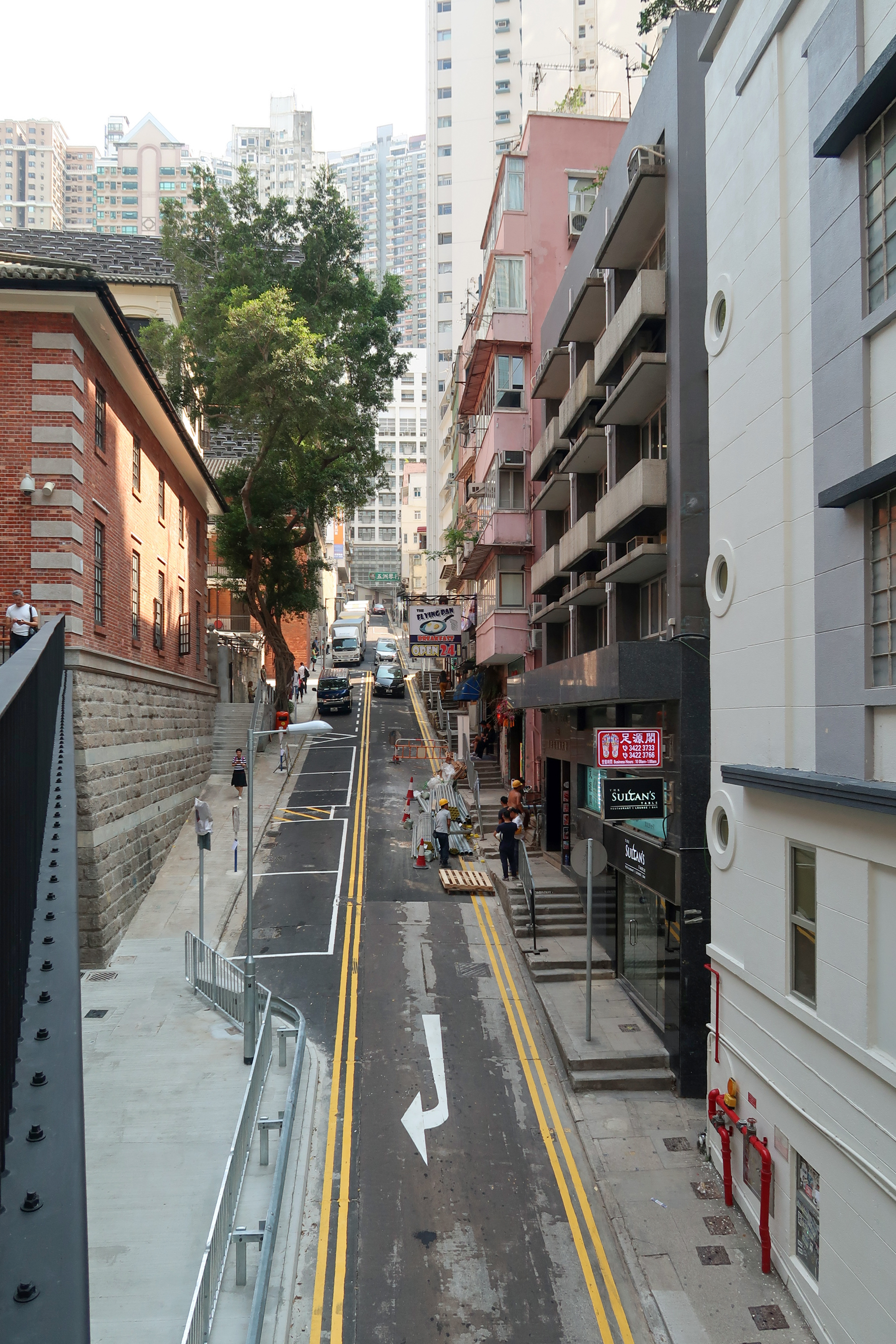
- Interactive map of Old Bailey Street
- Native name: 奧卑利 (Chinese)
- Nearest MTR station: Central
- Coordinates: 22.2754°N 114.1521°E
- South end: Caine Road
- North end: Hollywood Road

Old Bailey Street
- Traditional Chinese: 奧卑利街
- Simplified Chinese: 奥卑利街
Transcriptions
Standard Mandarin
- Hanyu Pinyin: Àobēilì Jiē

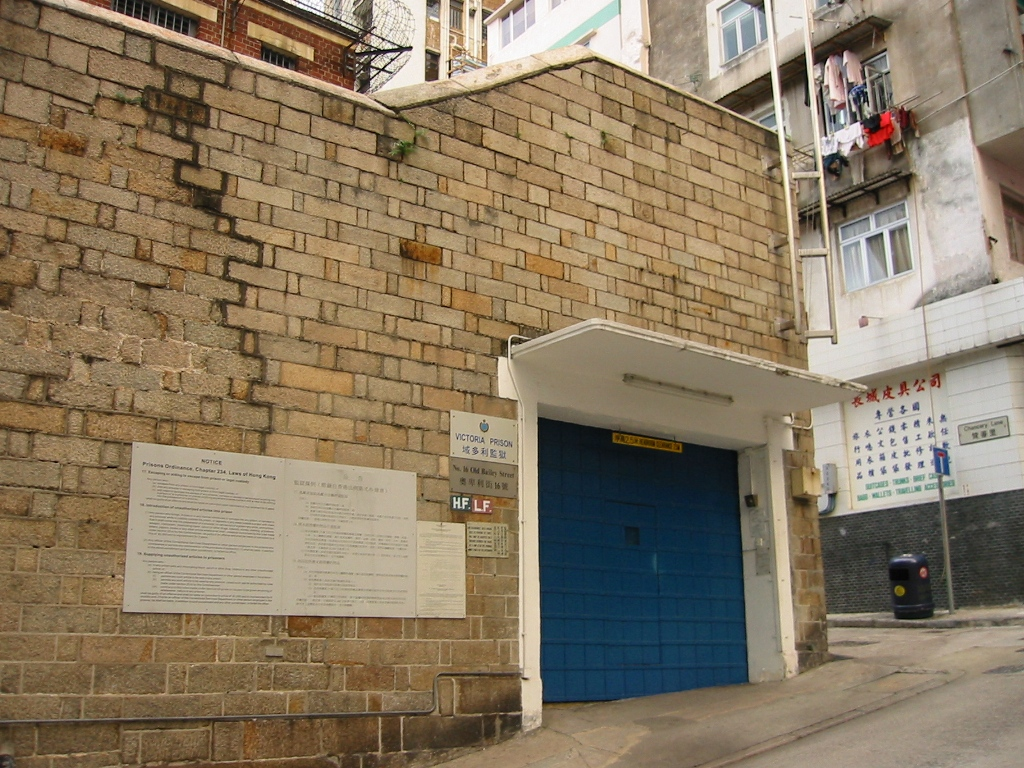
Blue Gate entrance of Victoria Prison along Old Bailey Street in 2005. The street starting at the corner of the prison wall on the right is Chancery Lane.

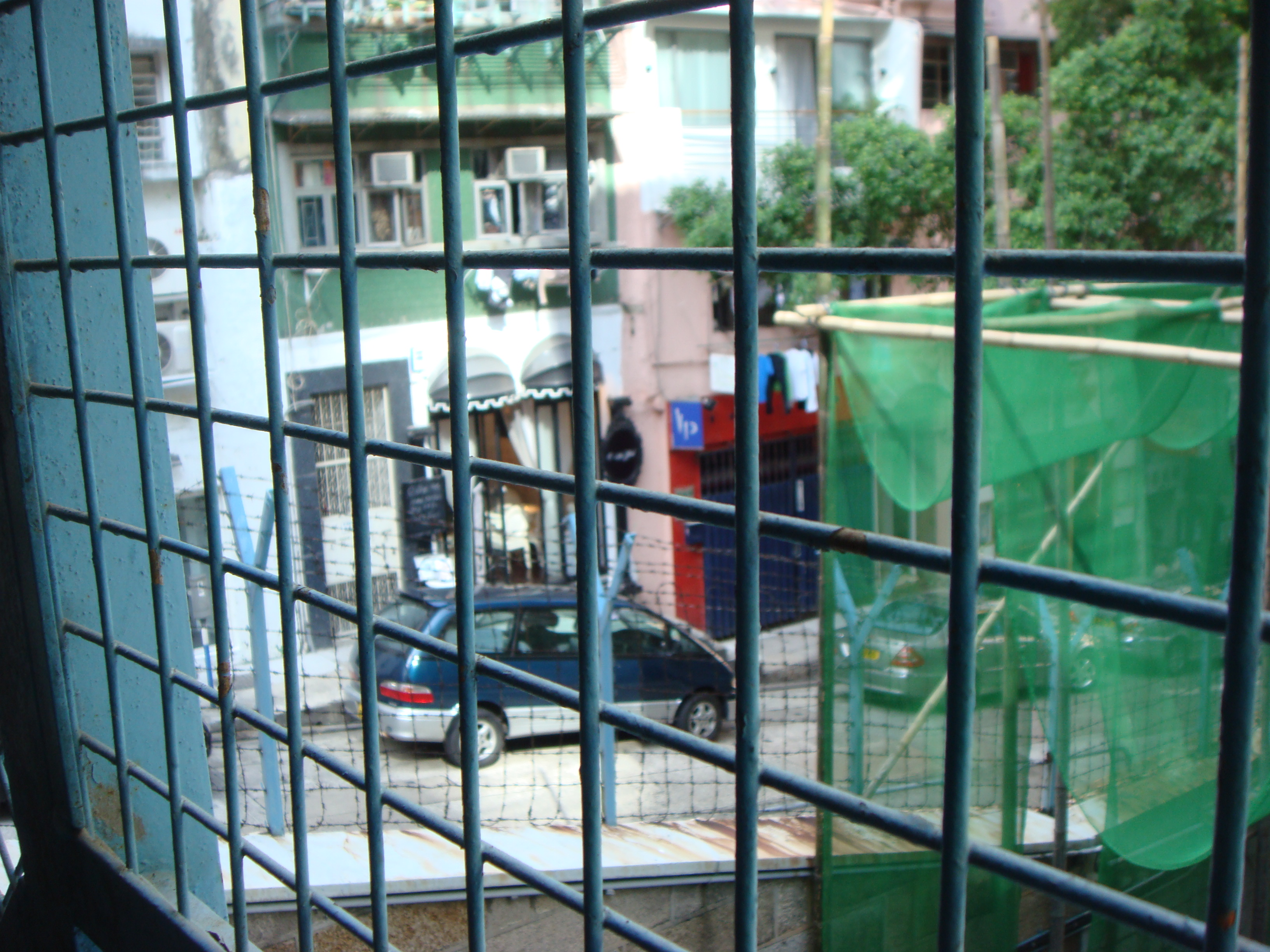
View of Old Bailey Street from Victoria Prison.

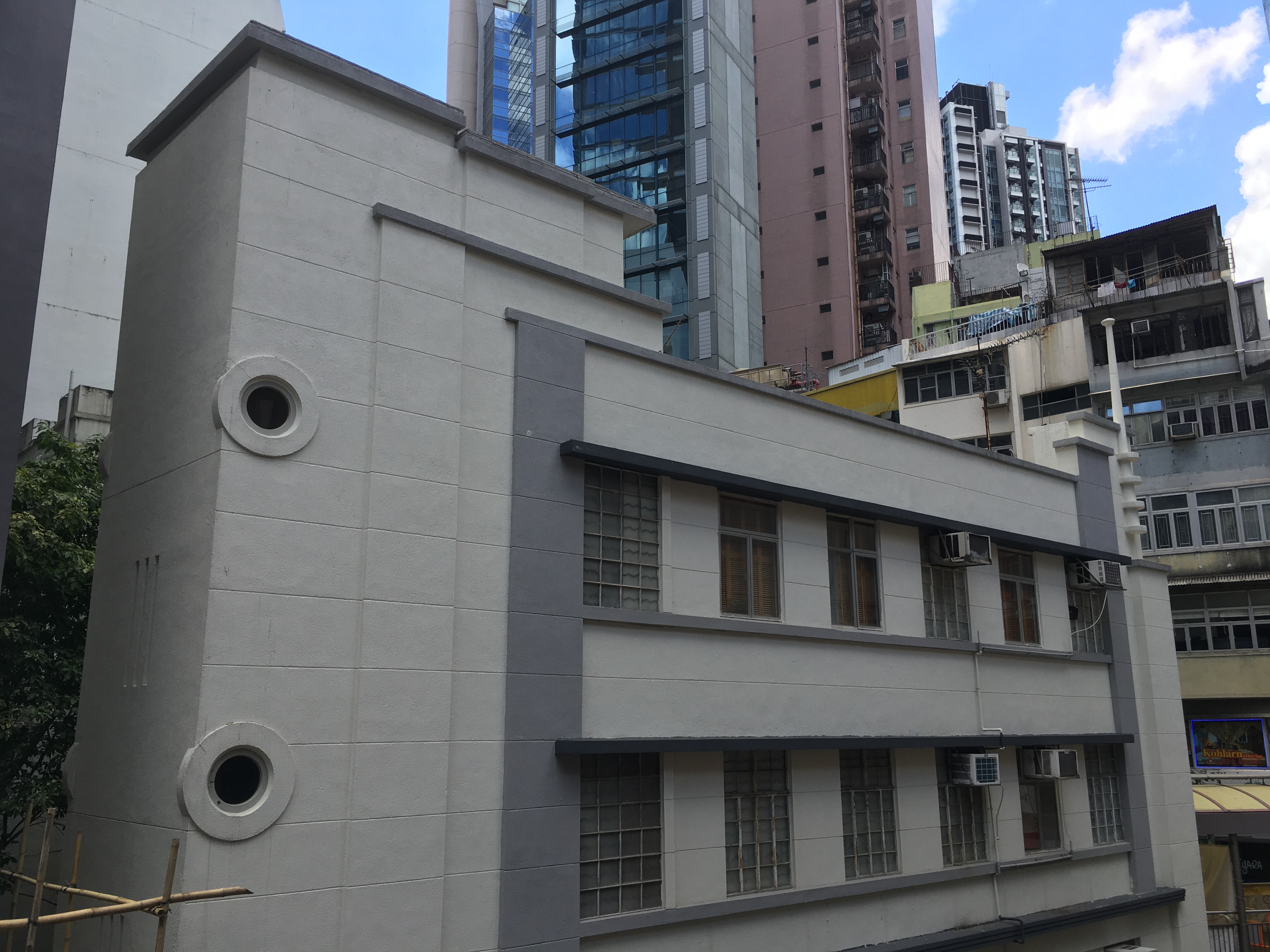
Old Bailey Street facade of No. 20 Hollywood Road.

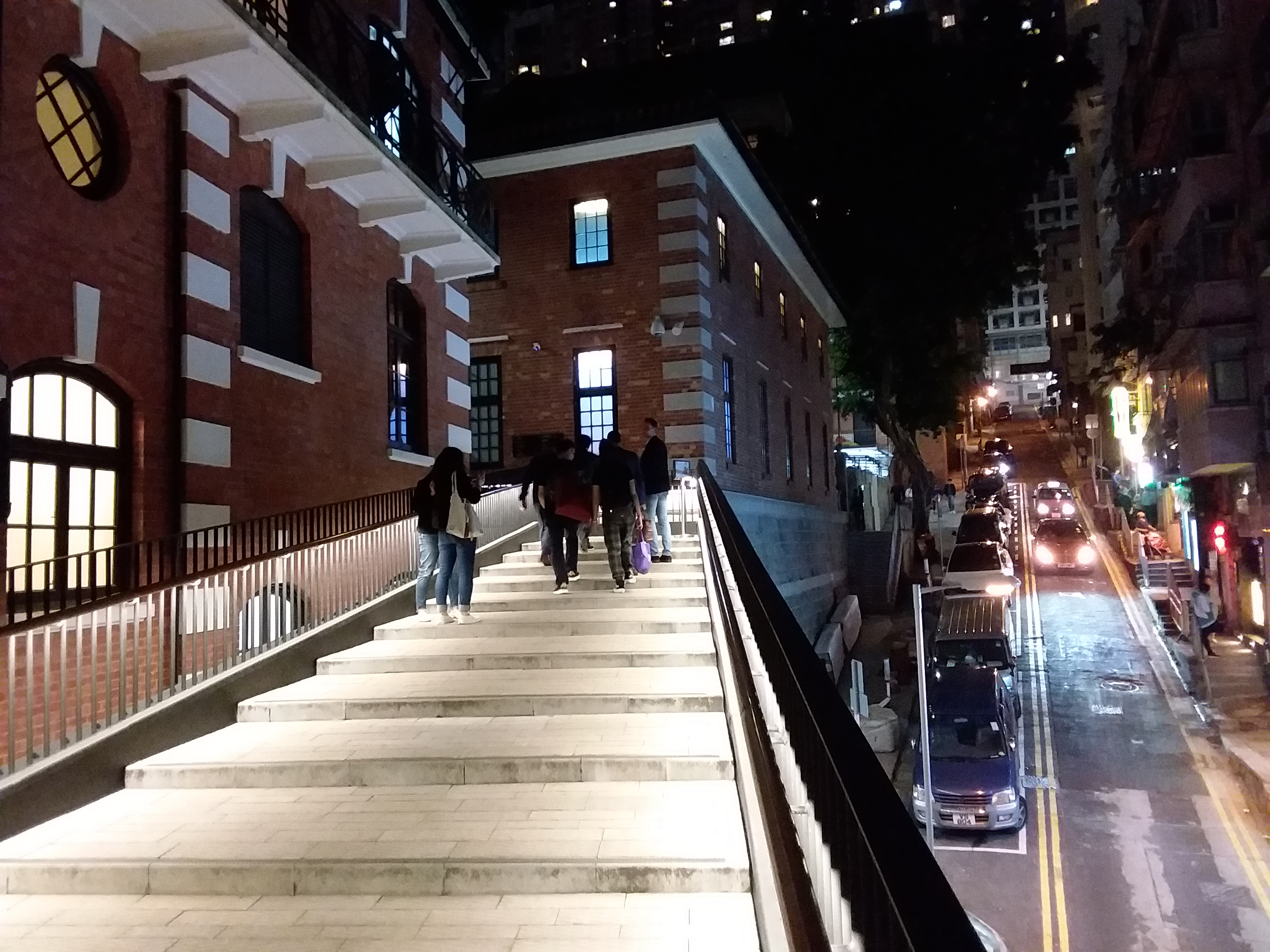
Footbridge in Old Bailey Street and across Hollywood Road, linking Tai Kwun to the Central–Mid-Levels escalator.

Old Bailey Street is located in Central, Hong Kong. The name is derived from Old Bailey, a street in central London, United Kingdom, where the Central Criminal Court of England and Wales is located.

== Location ==
Old Bailey Street runs downhill from Caine Road in the south to Hollywood Road in the north. Along the way, it has junctions with Chancery Lane (贊善里) and Staunton Street.

== History ==
Victoria Gaol (later Victoria Prison), the first prison in Hong Kong, was built in 1841. As the population in Hong Kong grew, a larger prison was needed and in 1925 construction began in Stanley. Later that year, a new prison opened as Stanley Prison where those sentenced to more than a year in detention were sent.

Old Bailey Street was built after the completion of the Victoria Gaol. It connected Hollywood Road right to the entrance of the prison. The road used to be called "the long slope" by locals. One possible reason is that after serving their prison term, the inmates emerged from the gate at Old Bailey Street and led new lives, hence "the long slope".

During the early colonisation of Hong Kong, prisoners in Victoria Prison were forced to parade in public, were often beaten with a cane, and their arms locked with a cangue on which their name and crimes-committed were penned. Policemen, often of Indian descent, would walk the prisoners to a plaza in front of the Man Mo Temple where the lawbreakers were scoffed and condemned by the passers-by. After a few hours, the criminal was returned to the Old Bailey Street jail. This form of punishment was abolished after World War I.

The Government Central School for Girls (later named Belilios Public School) was founded in 1890. Located at No. 16 Hollywood Road, which was then on the corner of Old Bailey Street and Hollywood Road, the school aimed to give 'an ordinary middle-class English education' to the daughters of Chinese, European and Indian residents of Hong Kong.

In the afternoon of 15 December 1941, during the Battle of Hong Kong, a stick Japanese bombs hit the junction of Old Bailey Street and Caine Road, the junction of Pottinger Street and Hollywood Road, Wellington Street and the Central Police Station. The bombing was part of a systematic bombardment of the Hong Kong Island's north shore that was launched on that day.

The Nanhua Ribao (南華日報) reported on July 20, 1942, that a handcart had slipped downward along the steep Old Bailey Street the day before, and had bumped into a rickshaw, injuring the puller.

In the mid-1990s the character of Old Bailey Street began to change, as new bars and restaurants moved onto the street in concert with the emergence of the SoHo entertainment district.

Comparatively high rents for commercial space and very high property prices against worldwide benchmarks have been reported in the 2000s and 2010s in Old Bailey Street.

== Features ==
The old Victoria Prison still stands on Old Bailey Street, but is no longer in use. It was closed in December 2005 and the Hong Kong Government, after a consultation period, has converted both the Prison, the old Central Police Station (which is at the intersection of Old Bailey Street and Hollywood Road) and the Former Central Magistracy into the Tai Kwun centre, which opened to the public on 29 May 2018.

The Old Bailey Street Police Married Quarters, at 17A Old Bailey Street, was completed in 1986. It includes one 24-storey block with six flats on each floor. The compound has been fortified with razor wire since the 2019–20 pro-democracy protests.

No. 20 Hollywood Road is a building located at the corner of Hollywood Road and Old Bailey Street. The lease on this landed property commenced in 1844, making it one of the earliest lots to be sold in Hong Kong. The current building was built in 1953. It is a four-storey building with Art Deco influences, that has been used for commercial use over the years. It is listed as a Grade III historic building.

Due to the steepness of the slope of the street, the sidewalks on both side feature a total of 74 stairs.

== See also ==
- List of streets and roads in Hong Kong
