= Caine Road =

Street in Hong Kong

Coordinates: 22.28117°N 114.15215°E

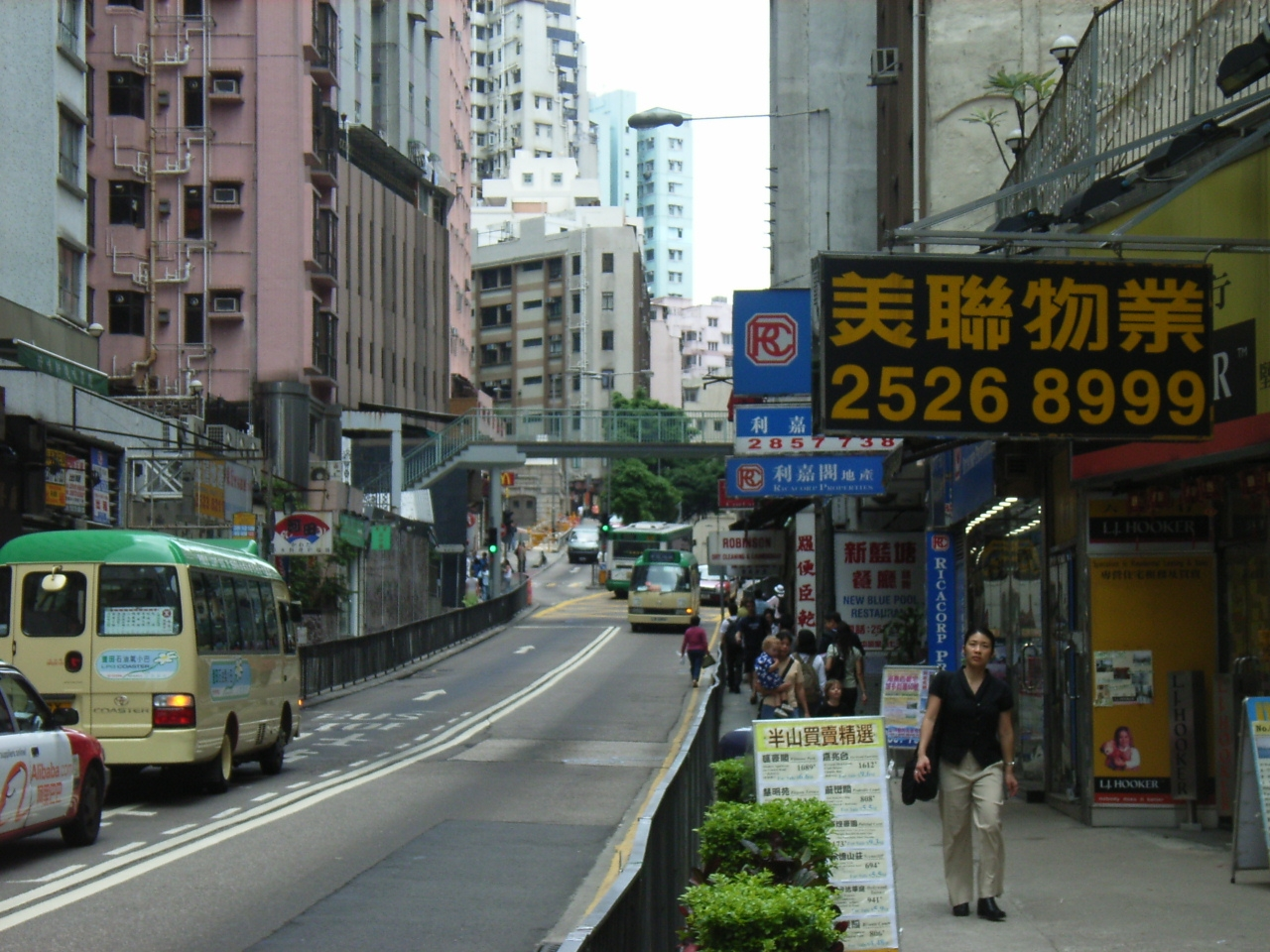
- Middle section of Caine Road
- Traditional Chinese: 堅道
- Simplified Chinese: 坚道
Transcriptions
Standard Mandarin
- Hanyu Pinyin: Jiān Dào
Yue: Cantonese
- Yale Romanization: gin1 dou6 or gin1 dou2

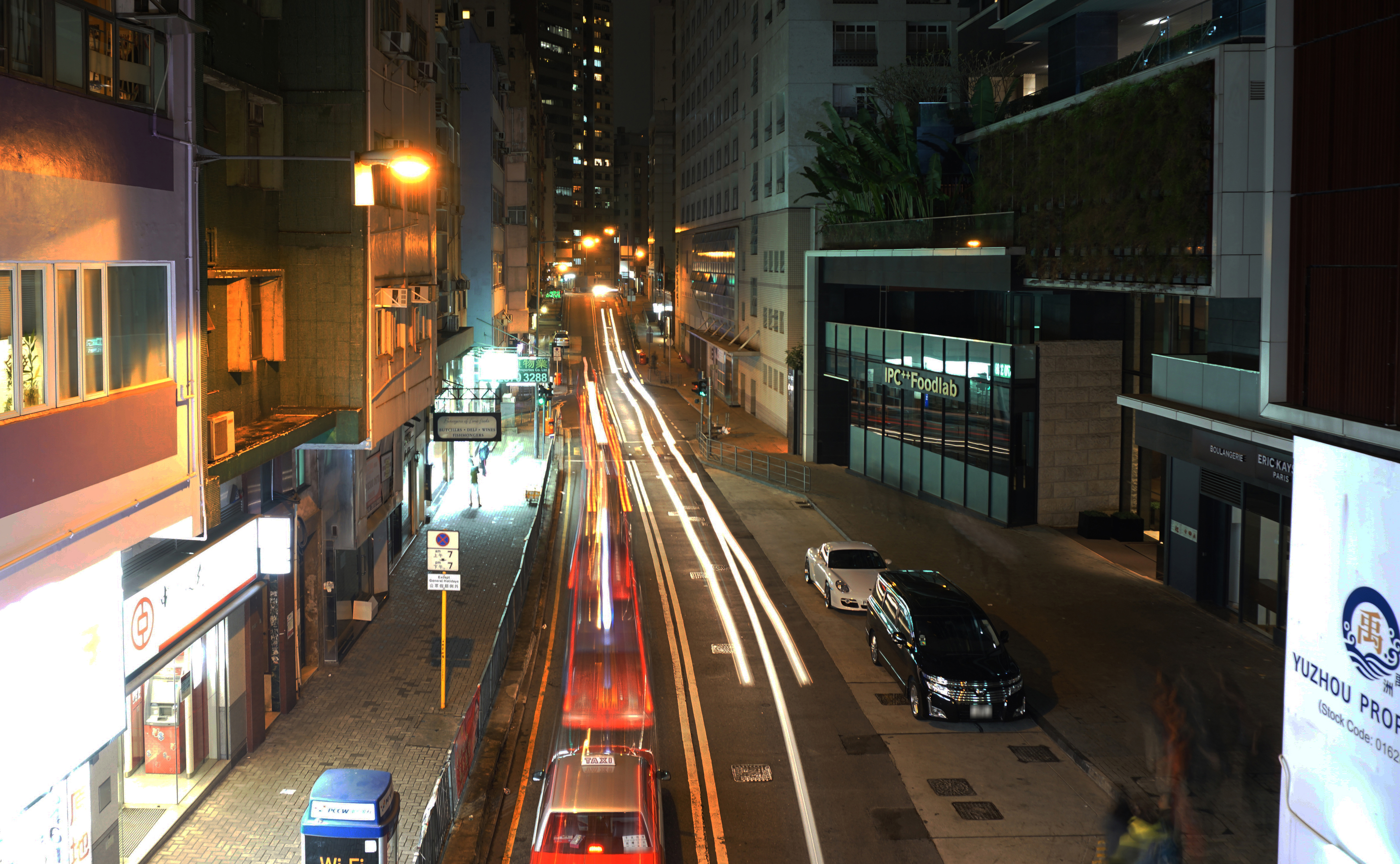
The night view of Caine Road

Caine Road (Chinese: 堅道; Jyutping: gin1 dou6) is a road running through Mid-Levels, Hong Kong. It connects Bonham Road to the west (at the junction with Hospital Road and Seymour Road) with Arbuthnot Road, Glenealy and Upper Albert Road to the east.

The road is named after William Caine, a Colonial Secretary, and acting Governor of Hong Kong between May and September 1859.

== History ==
From 1862 to 1865, during the American Civil War, Caine Road was home to Sara Delano – the mother of United States President Franklin D. Roosevelt – whose family had a permanent residence in Rose Hill on Caine Road (currently standing near the Immaculate Conception Cathedral of Hong Kong) through their connection to the American trading house Russell & Company.

On the afternoon of 15 December 1941, during the Battle of Hong Kong, Japanese bombs hit the junction of Old Bailey Street and Caine Road, the junction of Pottinger Street and Hollywood Road, Wellington Street and the Central Police Station. The attack – which had been launched that day – was the start of a systematic bombardment of Hong Kong Island's north shore. North Point Power Station was severely damaged during the raids.

== Features ==
The following major buildings and structures are located along Caine Road:

- Gateposts of Albron Court – a mansion built in the 1870s for businessman Hormusjee Naorojee Mody
- Kom Tong Hall
- Caritas Institute of Higher Education
- Immaculate Conception Cathedral of Hong Kong
- Old Pathological Institute (currently the Hong Kong Museum of Medical Sciences). An alley called Caine Lane is located behind the building.

== Transport ==
From 7 am to 7 pm during weekdays, driving westbound from Upper Albert Road is reserved for buses only. Private vehicles may drive west between 7 pm and 7 am on weekdays, after 1 pm on Saturdays, and all day on Sundays.

Public bus services: 12, 12M, 13, 23, 23B, 40, 40M, and 103 all have stops along this road.

== See also ==
- List of streets and roads in Hong Kong
