= Girish Jhunjhnuwala =

Hong Kong businessman

- Born: 1963 (age 62–63); Hong Kong
- Education: University of Southern California
- Occupation: Hotelier
- Organisation: Ovolo Group
- Title: Founder & CEO
- Spouse: Sarika Jhunjhnuwala
- Children: 3
- Website: www.ovologroup.com

Girish Jhunjhnuwala (born 1963) is an Indian hotelier based in Hong Kong. He is the founder of Ovolo Group, an independent hotel group headquartered in Hong Kong, and the CEO and Executive Chairman of Hind Group of Companies.

== Early life and education ==
Jhunjhnuwala was born in Hong Kong in 1963 to Indian parents who had moved from Haryana. His father was a watch manufacturer who settled in Hong Kong in the early 1950s. He grew up on Arbuthnot Road in Hong Kong's Central district.

He attended Island School in Hong Kong before moving to the United States for higher education. In 1984, he graduated from the Marshall School of Business at the University of Southern California (USC) with a Bachelor of Science in Business Administration.

== Career ==
=== Watch manufacturing ===
Jhunjhnuwala returned to Hong Kong to manage his family's OEM watch business under the Hind Group of Companies. He set up watch factories across the border in mainland China as the industry shifted. Observing the industry's technological regression, moving from mechanical to quartz, he decided to exit the business, eventually selling it in 2002.

=== Ovolo Group ===
After selling his watch business, Jhunjhnuwala ventured into property development. The transition began while searching for a venue for his wife's restaurant, he acquired a building on Arbuthnot Road. This building was developed into the first Ovolo serviced apartment in 2002.

In 2010, Ovolo Hotels was established through Ovolo Central, the group's first hotel in its portfolio.

Ovolo Group operates 8 properties across Hong Kong, Australia, and Bali in Indonesia, and Phuket, Thailand.

== Personal life ==
Jhunjhnuwala is married to Sarika Jhunjhnuwala. The couple have three children.

== Awards ==
- 1992 Outstanding Alumni of the Year, University of Southern California
- 2012 Owner Operator Award, DHL/SCMP Hong Kong Business Awards
- 2016 Ernst & Young Entrepreneur of the Year, China winner
- 2018 HM Magazine Asia-Pacific Hotelier of The Year (Winner)
