= Arbuthnot Road =

Street in Central, Hong Kong

Coordinates: 22.279502°N 114.154663°E

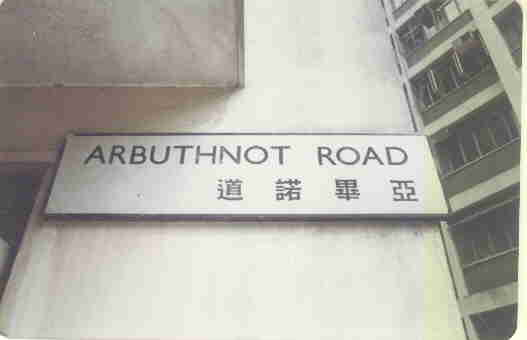
- Traditional Chinese: 亞畢諾道
- Simplified Chinese: 亚毕诺道
Transcriptions
Standard Mandarin
- Hanyu Pinyin: Yàbìnuò Dào
Yue: Cantonese
- Jyutping: Ngaa^{3}-bat^{1}-nok^{6} Dou^{6}

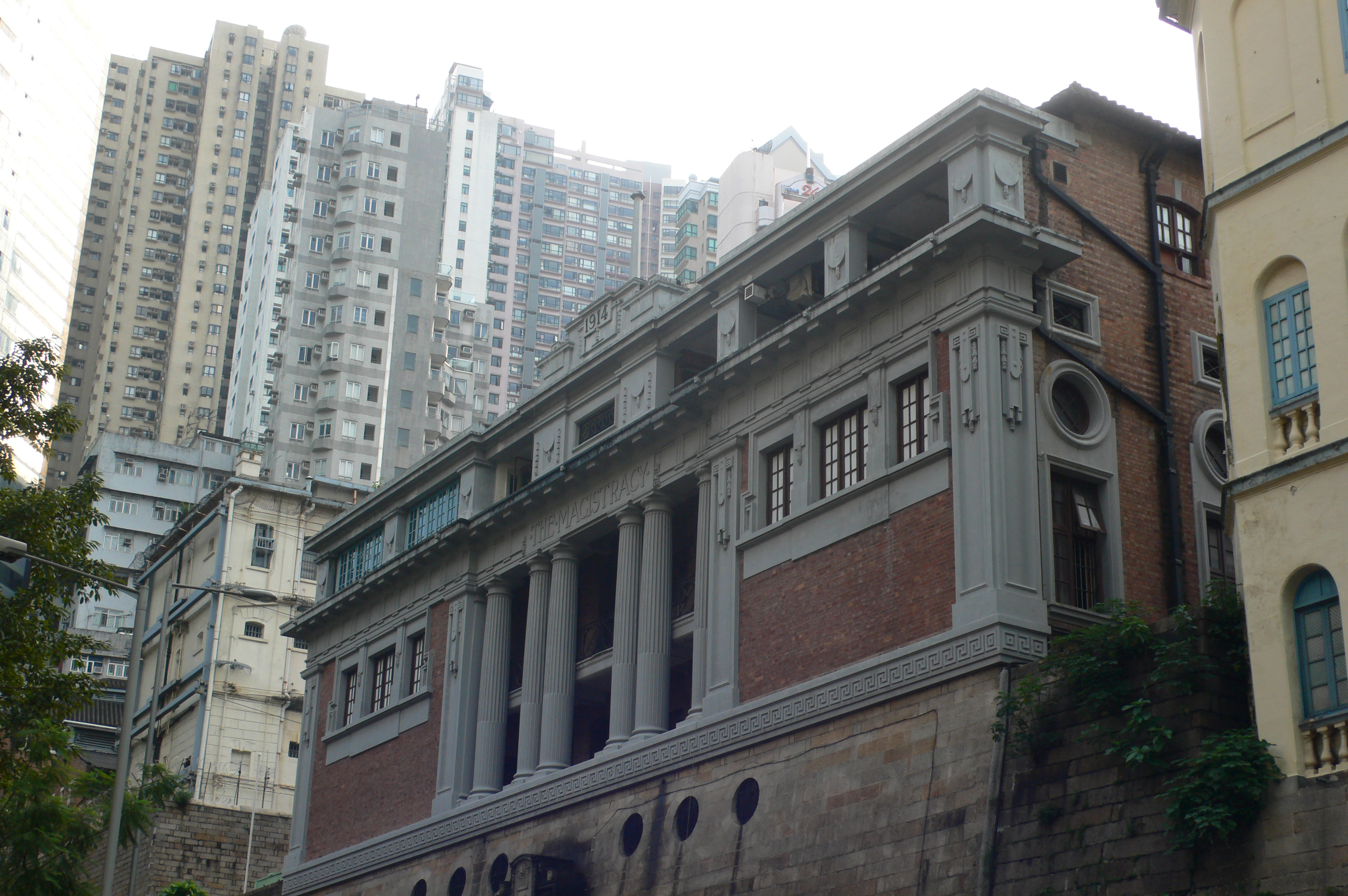
Façade of the Former Central Magistracy along Arbuthnot Road.

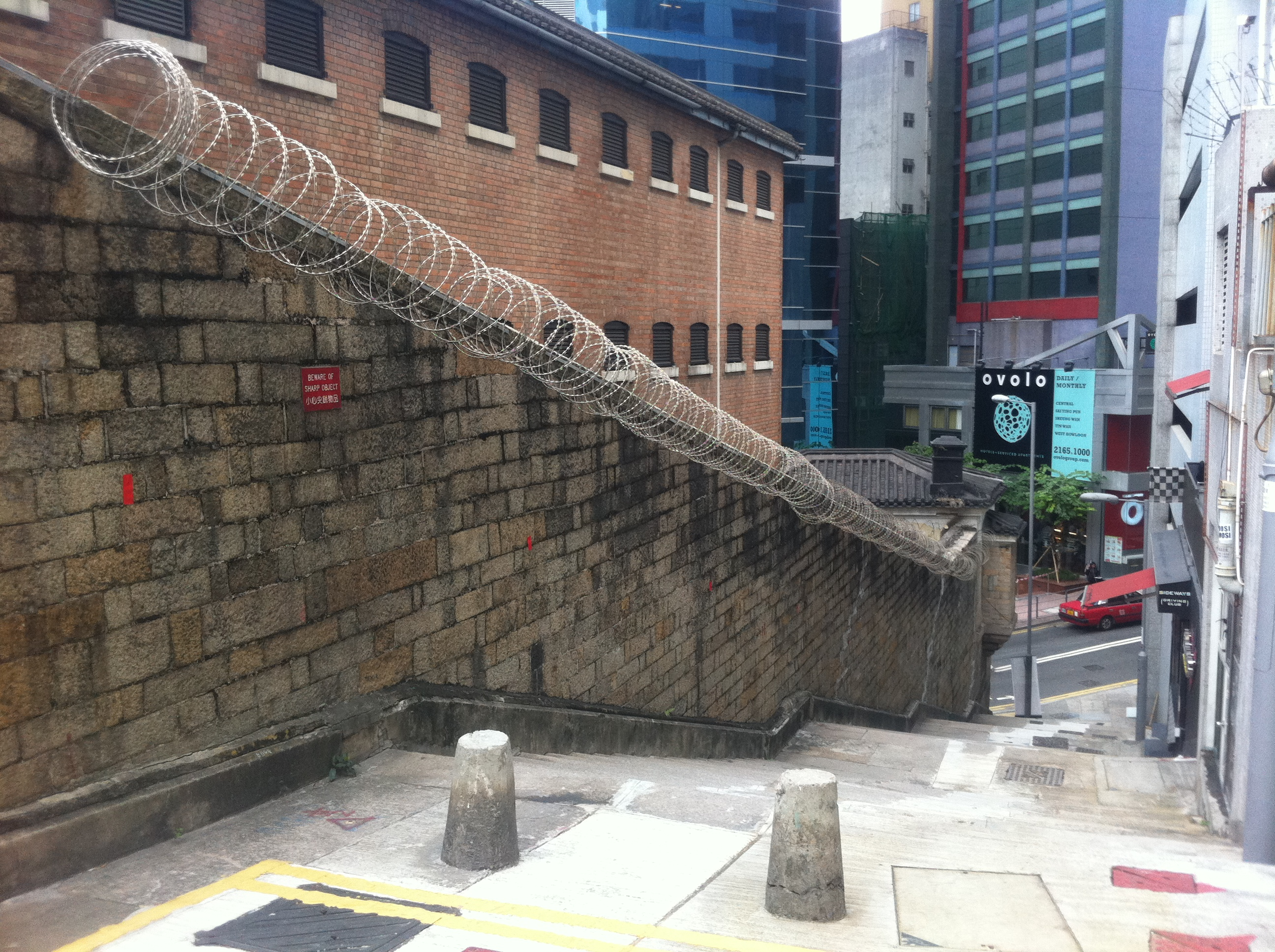
Chancery Lane, looking toward Arbuthnot Road. The building on the left is part of the former Victoria Prison.

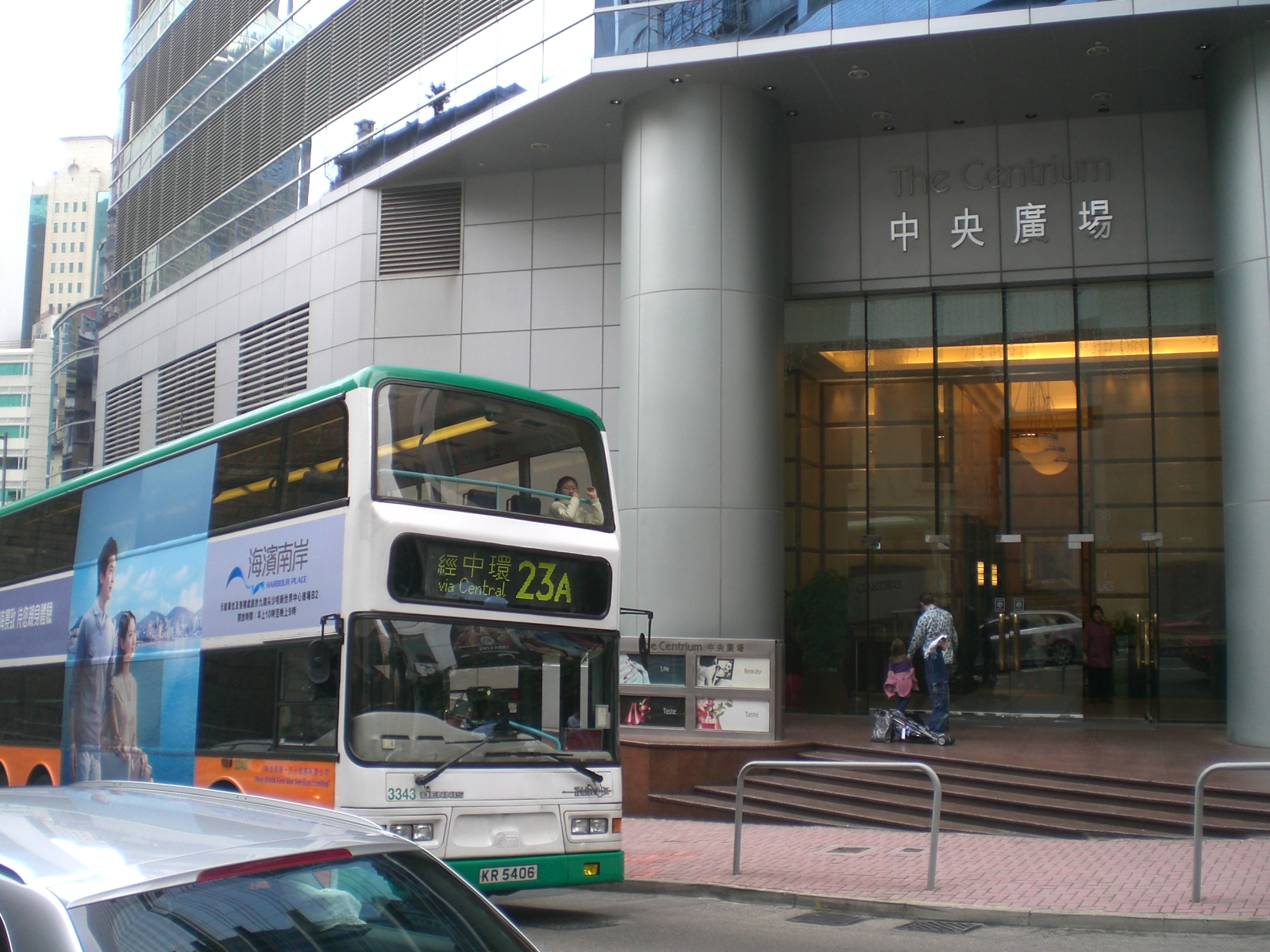
A bus in front of the Arbuthnot Road entrance of The Centrium.

Arbuthnot Road (Chinese: 亞畢諾道; Jyutping: aa3 bat1 nok6 dou6) is a road in Central, Hong Kong. The road begins at the Former Central Magistracy, a declared monument of Hong Kong. The road ends at the Hong Kong Zoological and Botanical Gardens.

== History ==
Most of the roads built and declared at the outset in colonial Hong Kong in 1841 were close to the waterfront. The Magistracy was not established until 1847, and the land on which it was built was previously largely unoccupied. Arbuthnot Road is rather inclined, and runs between Hollywood Road and Caine Road, the latter of which was not named until 1859. It is likely that it was not named or created until the 1850s or later; it was named after George Arbuthnot.

== Notable buildings ==
- No. 1: Hong Kong Police Club, former Central Magistracy
- No. 2: Cafe O, Ovolo Hotels
- Nos. 3-5a: Universal Trade Centre including the Orthodox Metropolitanate of Hong Kong and South-East Asia and the St Luke Cathedral of Hong Kong
- Nos. 4–8: Philia Lounge
- Nos 4–8: G/F La Kasbah (North African Food), 1/F Wild Grass (Western Restaurant)
- Nos. 4–8: SK serviced apartments
- No. 10: Chez Moi (French restaurant)

== See also ==
- List of streets and roads in Hong Kong
