= Ovolo Hotels =

Hotel chain in Hong Kong

- Type: Private
- Industry: Hospitality, tourism, hotel
- Founded: 2002; 24 years ago
- Headquarters: Hong Kong, Australia
- Number of locations: 12
- Owner: Girish Jhunjhnuwala

Ovolo Hotels (Chinese: 奧華酒店) is an independent hotel brand and serviced apartment owner-operator headquartered in Hong Kong. The hotel was founded by Girish Jhunjhnuwala and is a privately family-owned business under the Hind Group.

== History ==
Ovolo Hotels started as a serviced-apartment company in 2002. Girish Jhunjhnuwala acquired a single office complex in Hong Kong's Central Business District and developed it into an upscale serviced apartment.

After the opening of its first serviced apartment in 2002, the group has expanded. It had eight properties as of 2014. It now has hotels in Canberra, Melbourne and Sydney. The Weekend Australian in 2016 reported Jhunjhnuwala's intent to aggressively pursue the Australian market after the successful acquisition and turnaround of a hotel in Woolloomooloo, a suburb of Sydney. EJ Insight reported that Jhunjhnuwala's recent focus on Australian acquisitions is a result of high property prices in Hong Kong and the depreciating Australian dollar.

In Hong Kong, Ovolo operates 4 hotels across Hong Kong Island, with an addition of one remaining serviced apartment. Since 2015, Ovolo has offered a live-in coworking space under what it calls the Mojo Nomad programme. In 2018 Ovolo purchased the New Acton located Hotel Hotel in Canberra, and renamed it Ovolo Nishi as of March. In 2020, Ovolo switched all of its hotels and restaurants to go vegetarian for 365 days.
