= Victoria Prison =

Former prison in Hong Kong

Coordinates: 22.281073°N 114.153944°E

- Interactive map of Victoria Prison
- Location: Hong Kong
- Opened: 4 August 1841
- Closed: 2 March 2006

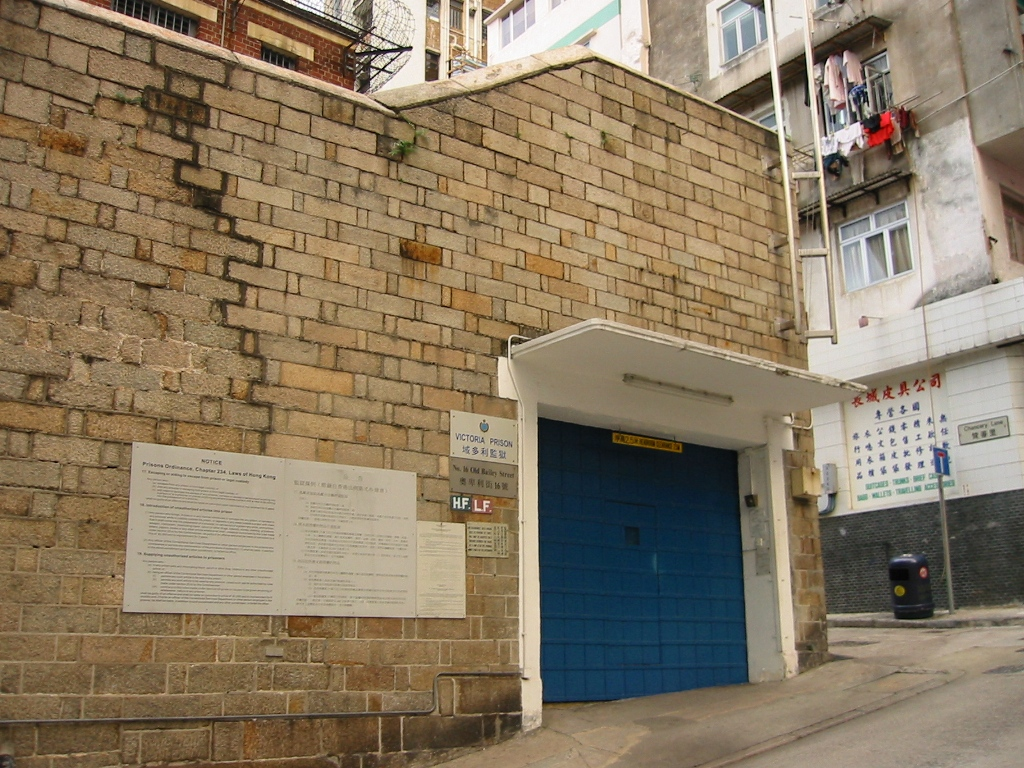
The entrance to Hong Kong's Victoria Prison in 2005.

Victoria Prison
- Traditional Chinese: 域多利監獄
- Simplified Chinese: 域多利监狱
Transcriptions
Standard Mandarin
- Hanyu Pinyin: Yùduōlì Jiānyù
Yue: Cantonese
- Yale Romanization: Wihk dō leih gāam yuhk
- Jyutping: Wik6 do1 lei6 gaam1 juk6

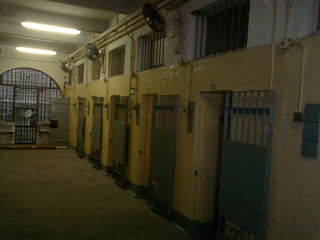
Interior of one of the halls

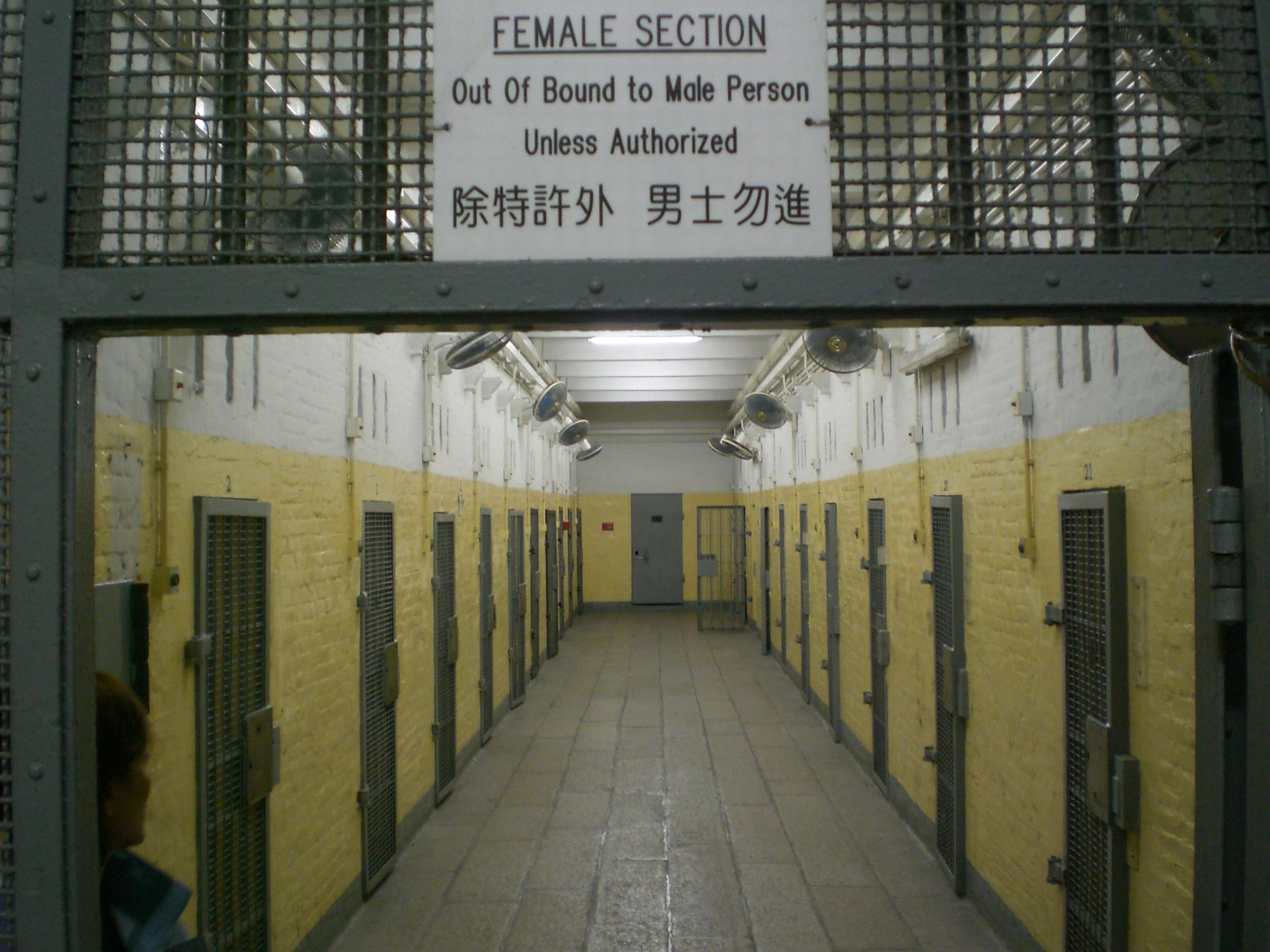
The Female Section of Hall D

Victoria Prison was the first and longest-running prison to date in Hong Kong. It is located on Old Bailey Street in Central, Hong Kong Island. Named in honour of Queen Victoria, it was originally known as Victoria Gaol and was renamed into Victoria Prison in 1899. Victoria Prison has been redeveloped into a cultural and shopping destination generally called Tai Kwun (大館). Tai Kwun is composed of three declared monuments: the former Central Police Station, former Central Magistracy and Victoria Prison.

== History ==
The prison was completed on 4 August 1842. It was originally known as the Victoria Gaol and is said to be the first western building constructed of durable material in Hong Kong. The prison still retains the façade of Victorian architecture, having been built mostly of granite and brick.

Ho Chi Minh, the Vietnamese revolutionary, was imprisoned there from 1931 to 1933.

During World War II, the prison was occupied by the Japanese and most of its buildings were damaged by bombing. The prison was re-opened for use in 1946 after restoration. When Hong Kong was later declared a port of first asylum for Vietnamese refugees, Victoria Prison became a transit and repatriation centre. It was subsequently developed into an institution with modern management facilities for accommodating discharged inmates of both sexes prior to repatriation or deportation. The prison buildings were declared monuments on 8 September 1995, together with the adjacent former Central Police Station and the former Central Magistracy. It was officially decommissioned on 12 March 2006. It has recently finished renovation and in 2018 Victoria Prison was reopened as The Tai Kwun Center for Heritage and Arts.

== Preservation guidelines ==
The completion dates of different parts of the old Central Police Station, the former Central Magistracy and Victoria Prison compound are listed below:

Year of Completion	Area	Heritage Guidelines
1860	D Hall West Wing of Victoria Prison	The exterior of the building must be preserved while future developers can apply for renovating the interior of the building
1864	Barrack Block	The exterior of the building must be preserved while future developers can apply for renovating the interior of the building
1914	Former Central Magistracy	The exterior of the building must be preserved while future developers can apply for renovating the interior of the building
1919	Headquarters Block	The exterior of the building must be preserved while future developers can apply for renovating the interior of the building
1910	Block A, B, C, D	Both the interior and exterior of the building is to be preserved
1914	B Hall, C Hall East Wing, C Hall West Wing, E Hall	Both the interior and exterior of the building is to be preserved
1925	Stable Block	Both the interior and exterior of the building is to be preserved
1945	A Hall	Both the interior and exterior of the building is to be preserved
after 1948	Sanitary Block	The exterior of the building must be preserved while the future developer can apply for renovating the interior of the building
1913, 1931, 1948	F Hall and all others	Future developers can apply for demolition of these building.

== Preservation of F Hall ==
=== Reasons for preserving F Hall ===
In the early 20th century, a series of changes happened in Victoria Prison. The existing F Hall, representing the door to the interior of the prison, was completed in 1913. It was used as a printing factory for prisoners to work and acquire skills. In 1931, F Hall was rebuilt as a two-storey building and a "weaving area" was added. After the Japanese Army invaded Hong Kong during World War II, many parts of the Prison, including F Hall, were severely damaged. F Hall was rebuilt in 1948 and was re-opened as a Government printing workshop (i.e. the former Printing Department). In 1956, the ground floor of F Hall was converted to an office and reception centre of the prison. The Victoria Prison finally closed down in early 2006.

The Government declared Victoria Prison as a declared monument in September 1995.

In early 2000, the Government planned to develop the Central Police Station and Victoria Prison Compound for cultural and tourism use, and to assign the Tourism Commission, which was responsible for developing the new tourist spots, to co-ordinate the development project. The Government also planned to let private enterprise develop and manage te heritage compound through public tender.

Accompanied by representatives of the Antiquities and Monuments Office (AMO), the Central and Western District Council (C&W DC) visited the heritage compound in April 2003. During the visit, the C&W DC learned that the Antiquities Advisory Board (AAB) had considered the 18 buildings in the heritage compound as historical buildings. However, AAB formally laid down a set of guidelines for developing the heritage compound after a meeting held in June 2004. The guidelines pointed out that only 17 buildings in the compound were considered historical buildings and that F Hall, located behind the entrance to Victoria Prison, was not on the list.

=== Motions passed by the Central & Western District Council on F Hall ===
The C&W DC strongly requested that F Hall of Victoria Prison be preserved, and that the future developer of the heritage compound not be given the right to decide whether F Hall should be demolished. The C&W DC also requested the AAB to reconsider the views of the public and the C&W DC. (This motion was passed by the C&W DC at a meeting held on 25 November 2004)

=== Views of Government on the preservation of F Hall ===
In a reply to the C&W DC in November 2004, AMO pointed out that the AAB had considered that in comparison with other historical buildings, the cultural value of F Hall was lower, and therefore F Hall should be kept under the category of non-historical buildings. AAB also viewed that the above decision would not affect the overall historical value of the Victoria Prison Compound. This could enhance the flexibility of the future development of the compound, and allow more creative design that was compatible with the historical buildings in the Victoria Prison Compound.

At the C&W DC meeting held on 2 November 2004, Dr. Louis Ng, the former Executive Secretary of the Antiquities and Monuments Office stated that the Government declared the whole heritage compound as declared monuments in 1995. However, the Government did not specify the cultural value and preservation mode of individual buildings in the heritage compound, nor pointed out particularly that F Hall was a historical building. According to the Antiquities and Monuments Ordinance, any demolition works to be carried out in the heritage compound is to be approved by the Antiquities Authority (i.e. the Secretary for Home Affairs). Upon receiving an application for demolition of a building in the heritage compound, the Antiquities Authority will consider the cultural value of relevant buildings and the necessity of the demolition works etc. Doctor Louis Ng has clarified that AAB did not ask for demolition of F Hall, but considered if there was a need to fulfill the design, the Board would consider demolition of F Hall.

=== Views put forward by the C&W DC on the preservation of F Hall ===
At a meeting held on 25 November 2004, C&W DC members put forward the following views regarding the preservation of F Hall:

- Demolition of F Hall would affect unity of the heritage compound, and therefore the future developer should not be given the right to decide whether F Hall should be demolished.
- F Hall represented the entrance of the whole heritage compound. Without this entrance, the heritage compound could not be regarded as a heritage compound.
- There was educational value in F Hall. It was a typical prison and was totally different from B Hall and E Hall. If the future developer was given the right to decide whether F Hall should preserved, F Hall would not exist and the history of prisons in Hong Kong would certainly diminish.
- It was hoped that the Government would review the preservation of F Hall. The Hong Kong Institute of Architects has indicated that F Hall should not be demolished, and only part of F Hall should be redeveloped. The heritage compound reflected the prison development in Hong Kong. If the future developer was given the right to decide whether F Hall should be preserved, they would certainly pull down the building for redevelopment

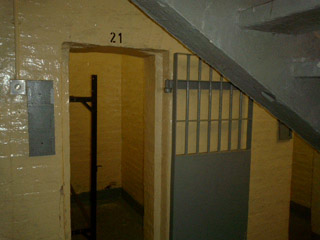
Typical Victoria Prison cell

== Buildings ==
The prison complex consists of 3 three-storey buildings, 3 two-storey buildings and 3 single-storey buildings. Inside these buildings there are cellular and dormitory accommodations, a special unit, a hospital, a kitchen, dining halls/ dayrooms, a laundry, an exercise yard and an administration block.

The prison had undergone several stages of expansion since its original founding with the major one in 1895 when D Hall complex with its Neo-Georgian architectural style was built. A further stage of major expansion took place in 1914 with the addition of B Hall, C Hall and E Hall to cope with the needs of the time.

The various buildings were constructed as follows:

Hall	Constructed
A Hall	1945
B Hall	1914
C Hall West	1914
C Hall East	1914
D Hall East	1860
D Hall West	1860
E Hall	1914
F Hall	1913, 1931, 1948

The overall compound also comprises 7 blocks of the old Central Police Station as follows:

Hall	Constructed
Headquarters Block	1919
Block A	1910
Block B	1910
Block C	1910
Block D	1910
Stable Block	1925
Barrack Block	1864

And finally, there is also one former Central Magistracy building built in 1914.

The compound is bordered on the North by Hollywood Road, on the South by Chancery Lane, on the East by Arbuthnot Road and on the West by Old Bailey Street.

== 2006 public opening ==
Upon its decommission, the "Victoria Prison Decommissioning Open Days" event was organised. The prison was opened to the public on 11, 17 and 18 March 2006 as a charity event to raise funds for the Community Chest of Hong Kong. Each visitor was asked to donate HK$20 to the charity.

Correctional Services department staff volunteers dressed in old staff uniforms helped to provide a glimpse of the changes in attire over the years, when the former Prisons Department was renamed the Correctional Services Department in 1982.

A piece of the equipment for administering corporal punishment, called the "Cat-of-nine tails" (a whip), was also on display.

== 2007 public opening ==
The Central and Western District Council organised six Open Days in January 2007 under the title of "Journey to the History of Victoria Prison"

Guided tours were led by docents to historical buildings in the heritage compound. There was a "Prison Art Museum" where local artists were given access to several cells that they could decorate or use as a display gallery.

The Open Days were scheduled on 6, 7, 13, 14, 20 and 21 January 2007 from 09:30 to 16:00.

== In popular culture ==
- Victoria Prison appeared in the 2008 Anthony Horowitz novel Necropolis as Scarlett Adams' and Matthew Freeman's prison when they are captured by the Nightrise corporation.
- This prison serves as a main setting for Hong Kong TVB drama series Phoenix Rising.

== See also ==
- List of places named for Queen Victoria, for a list of places named after Queen Victoria
- Malcolm Struan Tonnochy - Superintendent of Victoria Gaol 1876-1882
