= Former Central Magistracy =

Historic building in Central, Hong Kong

Coordinates: 22.281078°N 114.154519°E

- 中央裁判司署
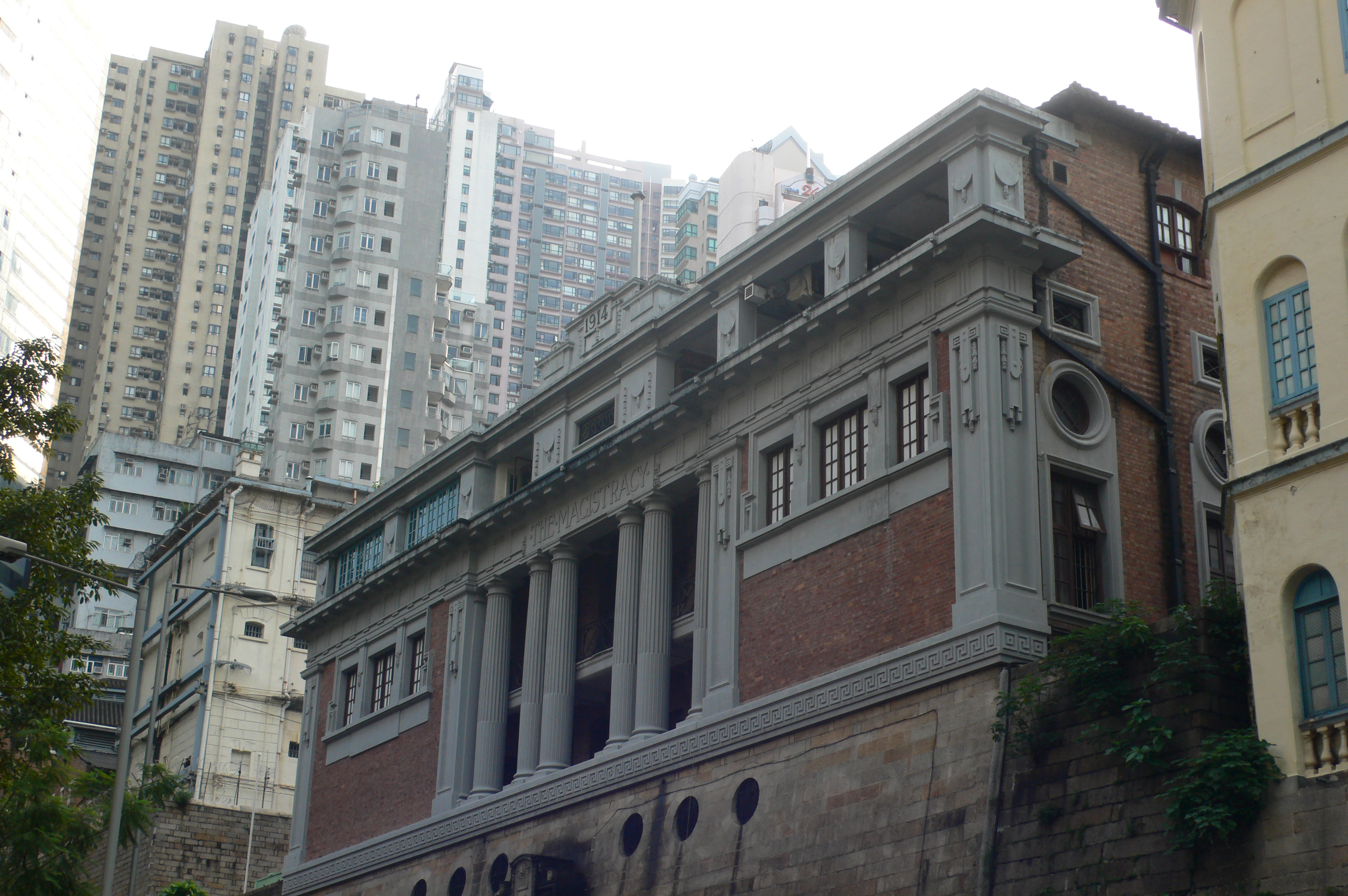
- The Former Central Magistracy
- Interactive map of the Former Central Magistracy area

General information
- Type: Courthouse
- Architectural style: Greek-revival style
- Location: Central, 1 Arbuthnot Road, Victoria, Hong Kong, China
- Current tenants: Hong Kong Police Force
- Groundbreaking: 1913
- Completed: 1914
- Closed: 1979
- Owner: Hong Kong Government

Design and construction
- Designations: Declared monument

Former Central Magistracy
- Chinese: 中央裁判司署
Transcriptions
Standard Mandarin
- Hanyu Pinyin: Zhōngyāng Cáipàn Sī Shǔ
Yue: Cantonese
- Yale Romanization: Jūng yēung chòih pun sī chyúh
- Jyutping: Zung1 yoeng1 coi4 pun3 si1 cyu4

The former Central Magistracy is located at 1 Arbuthnot Road, Central, Victoria, Hong Kong. It was constructed from 1913 to 1914.

== History ==
The site where the building is standing was originally occupied by the first Hong Kong Magistracy. The former building was probably erected in 1847 but was later demolished to make way for the present building. Difficulty and delay in the construction work was caused because of the provision of an extensive basement in the new magistracy. The Central Magistracy was closed in 1979 and was subsequently used by different associations affiliated to the Royal Hong Kong Police Force (RHKPF).

== Architecture ==
The building's majestic appearance, with the imposing pillars of the façade and other features in the Greek-revival style, are lost to its poor exposure fronting onto a steep, narrow road. The massive retaining walls were constructed with granite blocks.

== Conservation ==
The former Central Magistracy has been redeveloped into a cultural and shopping destination generally called Tai Kwun (大館). Tai Kwun is composed of three declared monuments: the former Central Police Station, former Central Magistracy and Victoria Prison.

== See also ==
- Central and Western Heritage Trail
- Former French Mission Building
- Legislative Council Building
