= Liquor Licensing Board =

Liquor Licensing Board may refer to:

- Liquor Licensing Board (Hong Kong)
- Liquor Licensing Board (Northwest Territories)
- Liquor Licensing Board (Nunavut)
- Liquor Licence Board of Ontario
