= Gresson Street =

Road in Hong Kong

Coordinates: 22.27650°N 114.16984°E

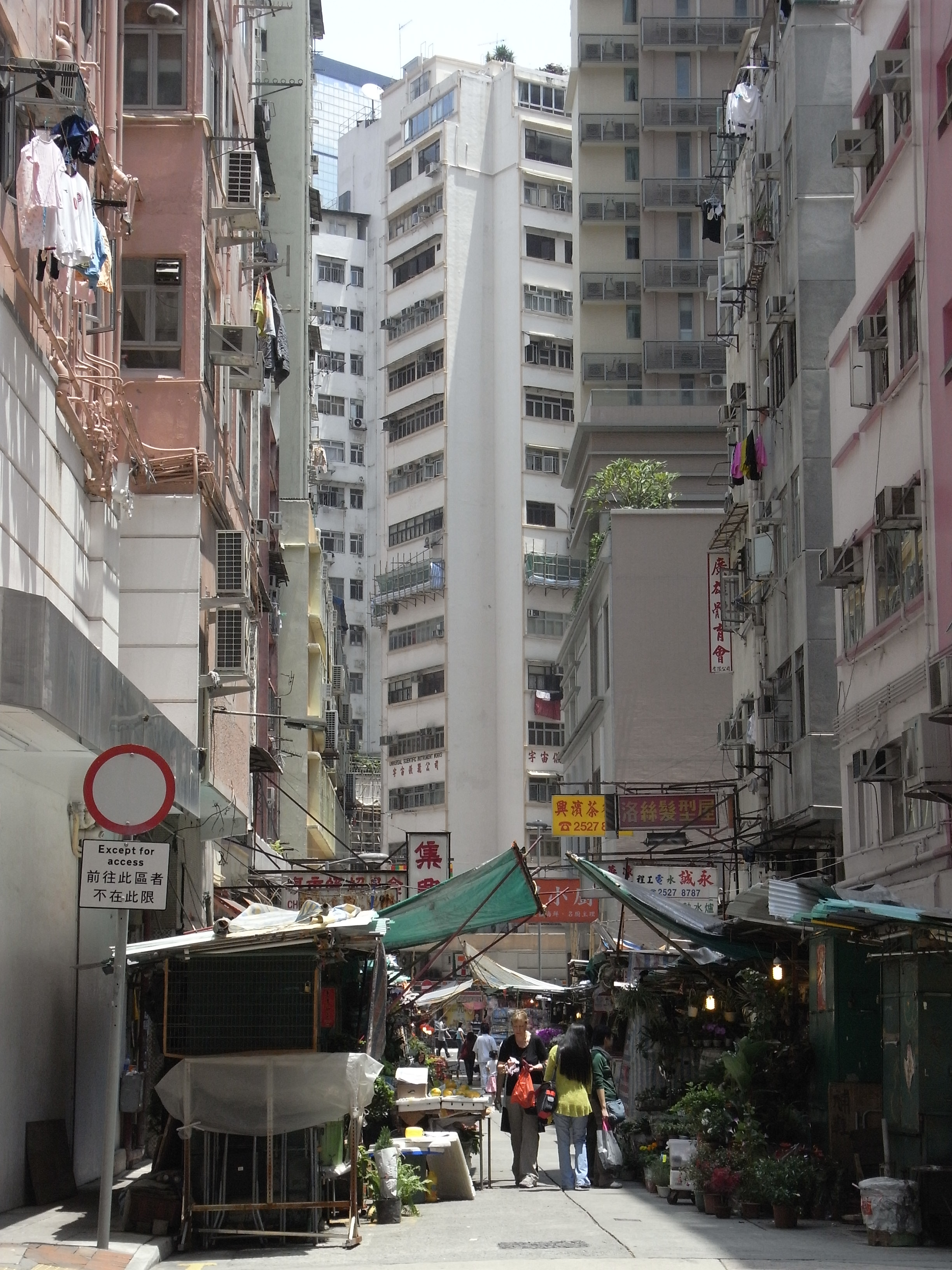
- Southern end of Gresson Street, viewed from Queen's Road East.
- Interactive map of Gresson Street
- Native name: 機利臣街 (Chinese)
- Location: Wan Chai, Hong Kong
- North end: Queen's Road East

Gresson Street
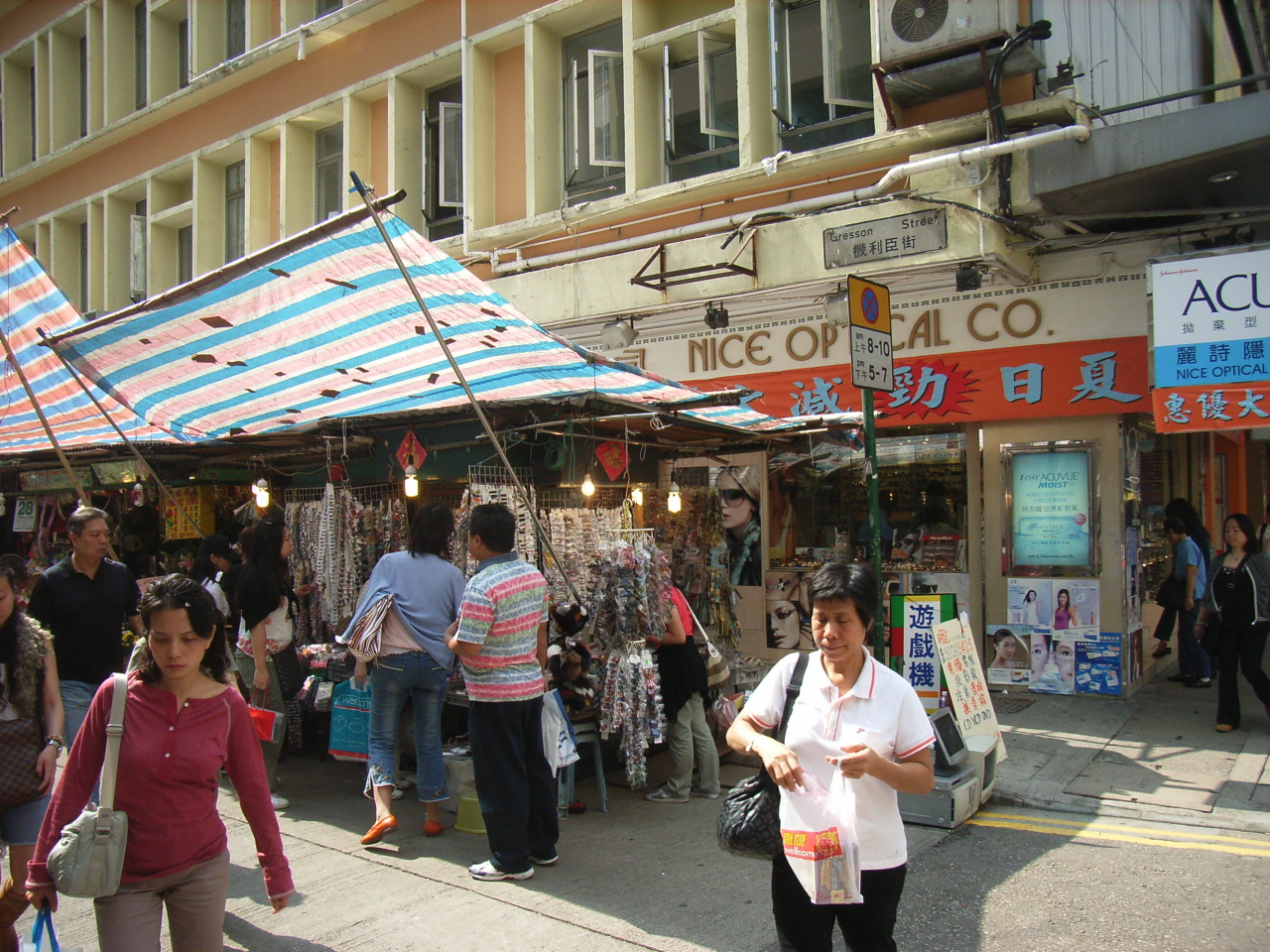
- Stalls in Gresson Street open market.
- Traditional Chinese: 機利臣街
Transcriptions
Yue: Cantonese
- Yale Romanization: gaai1

Gresson Street (Chinese: 機利臣街) is a partially pedestrianised street in the Wan Chai area of Hong Kong Island. It runs between Queen's Road East in the south to Johnston Road in the north.

== History ==
Gresson Street opened around 1909 on Marine Lots 29 and 30, when the lots were redeveloped by Hongkong Land. The street was named after William Jardine Gresson (1869–1934), a partner of Jardine, Matheson & Co. from 1901 to 1910.

A noted shootout, the "Siege of Gresson Street", took place here on 22 January 1918, when a gang of armed robbers became trapped while raiding a tenement in No. 6 Gresson Street. Five policemen and three robbers were shot dead, whilst a further six policemen (and one robber) were wounded. The Governor, Francis May, a former Captain Superintendent of Police, personally negotiated with the last remaining gang member, but to no avail. When the young man refused to surrender, the Royal Garrison Artillery were called to "bomb" him out.

== Market ==
Opened in the 1950s, the market on Gresson Street forms part of the Wan Chai Heritage Trail; stalls sell wet and dry goods, as well as flowers.

== See also ==
- Queen's Road East, for a list of roads connecting Johnston Road and Queen's Road East.
