= Old Wanchai Market Building =

Coordinates: 22.274607°N 114.17434°E

- 灣仔街市
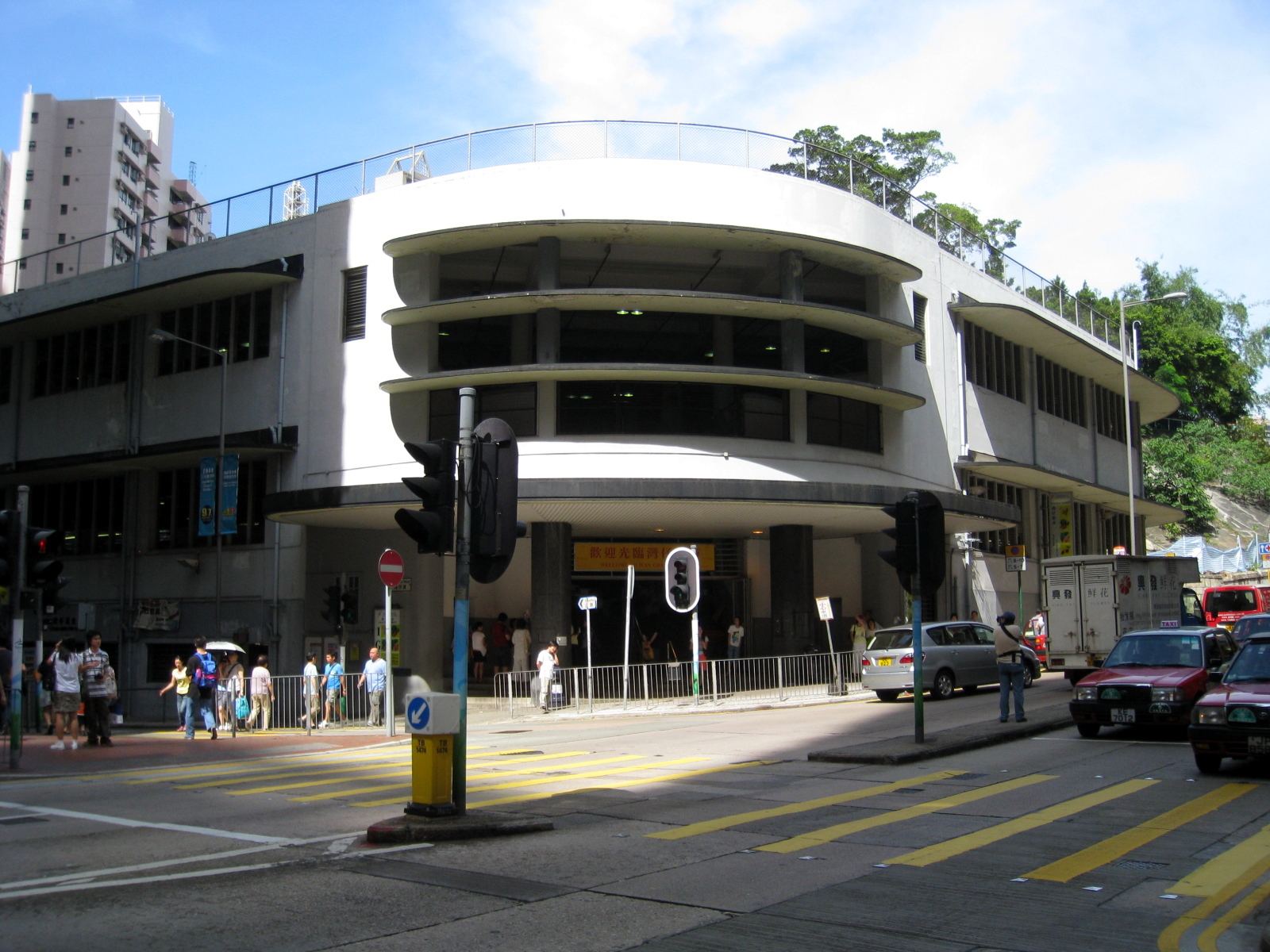
- Old Wanchai Market Building in 2008

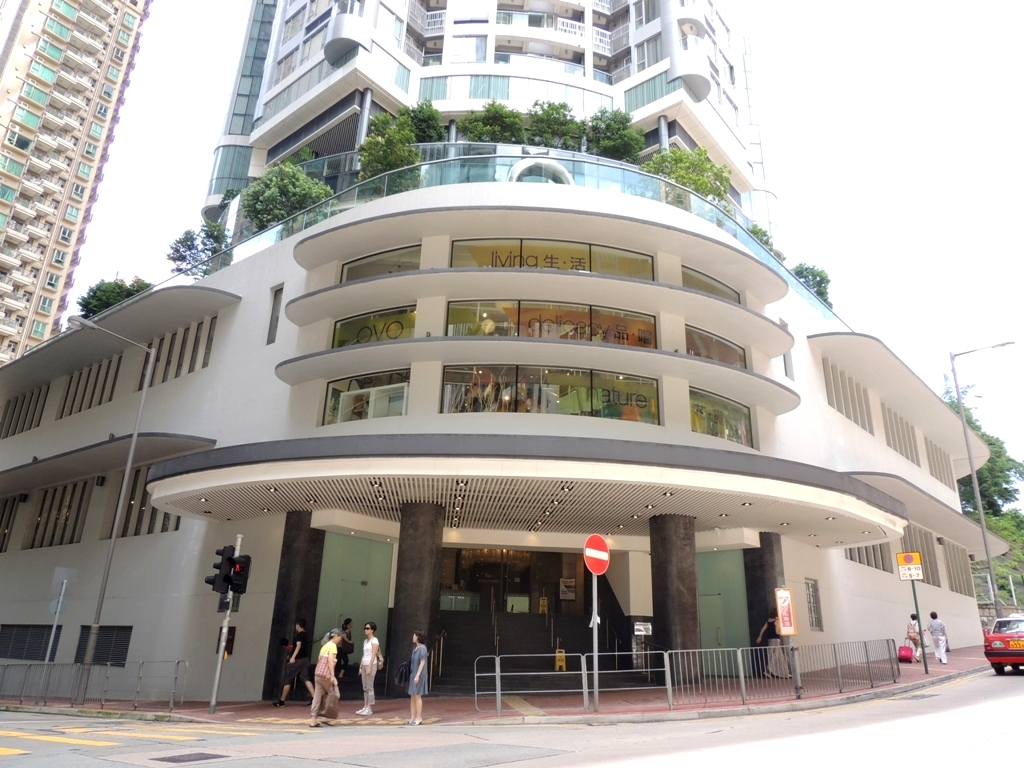
- The building in 2014

General information
- Architectural style: Streamline Moderne
- Classification: Grade III Historic Building
- Location: Wan Chai, Hong Kong Island
- Address: 264 Queen's Road East
- Country: Hong Kong
- Completed: 1937; 88 years ago
- Relocated: September 2008; 16 years ago

Old Wanchai Market Building
- Traditional Chinese: 灣仔街市
- Simplified Chinese: 湾仔街市
Transcriptions
Standard Mandarin
- Hanyu Pinyin: Wān Zǎi Jiēshì
Yue: Cantonese
- Yale Romanization: Wāan jái gāai síh
- Jyutping: Waan1 zai2 gaai1 si5

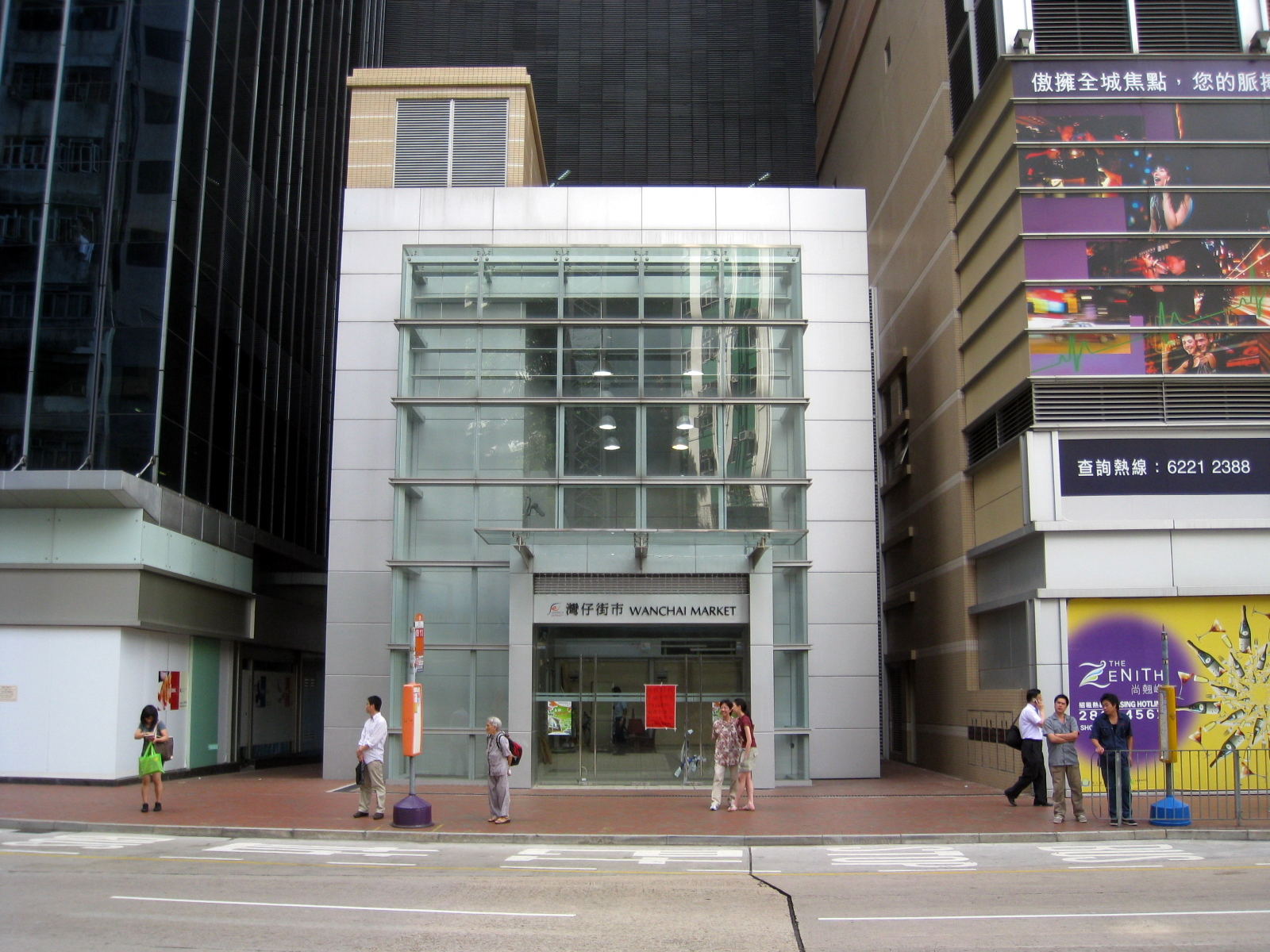
(New) Wanchai Market at the Zenith

The Old Wanchai Market Building was constructed in 1937. It is located at 264 Queen's Road East, at the Wan Chai Road crossing, opposite Stone Nullah Lane in Wan Chai, Hong Kong Island. It is a Grade III Historic Building.

Its architectural style is influenced by Streamline Moderne (also known as Streamlined Moderne or Art Moderne) architecture, a popular style of building of the 1930s. It is often erroneously referred to as a Bauhaus-style building.

Wan Chai Market, the wet market housed in the old market building since 1937, has moved into the new market complex on the lower levels of "The Zenith", a newly built residential development located just opposite to the market building, in September 2008.

The Wan Chai Market was initially a wet place where merchants would sell their belongings. It was also used as a garage for Bullock Carts and thus was called the 'Wet Garage' (Chinese: 濕車庫). It was named in 1917.

== History ==
During Japanese occupation, the basement of the Wan Chai Market was used by Japanese soldiers for the storage of corpses.

In 1961, the Market underwent a renovation to improve its facilities and environment so that the Market could compete with other market places in the district.

The Land Development Corporation obtained approval from the Executive Council to acquire land in Wan Chai, including this site, for redevelopment as part of an urban renewal project. A consortium was formed comprising Chinese Estates (40%), Kwong Sang Hong (25%), Chi Cheung Investment (20%) and Peregrine Group (15%).

Chinese Estates, controlled by Joseph Lau Luen-hung, agreed with the Urban Renewal Authority in 1996 to jointly redevelop the site into a luxury residential-commercial complex. Phase two of the project, which requires the demolition of the building, was scheduled to start early 2008 and be completed by mid-2011.

In 2007, the Urban Renewal Authority and the Development Bureau jointly announced that the facade and the front part of the historic market building will be preserved in the redevelopment project; the front part will be used as a shopping centre. A residential building will stand at the back of the market building.

== Facilities ==
There is a basement and staff quarters in the building.

== In popular culture ==
In the successful video game by Eidos, Deus Ex, Wan Chai Market is used as the basis for a portion of the game.

== Gallery ==
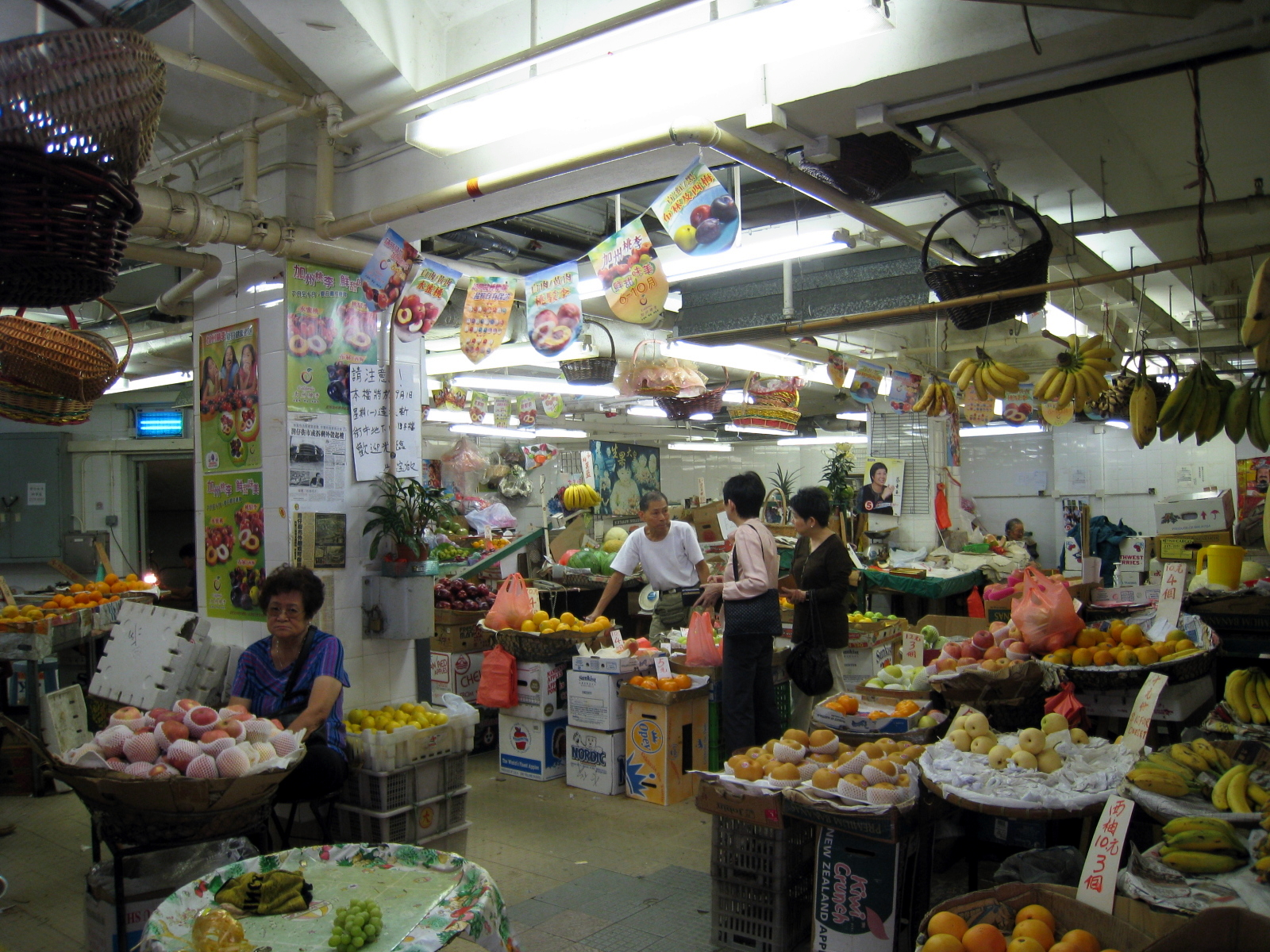
Wan Chai Fruit Market

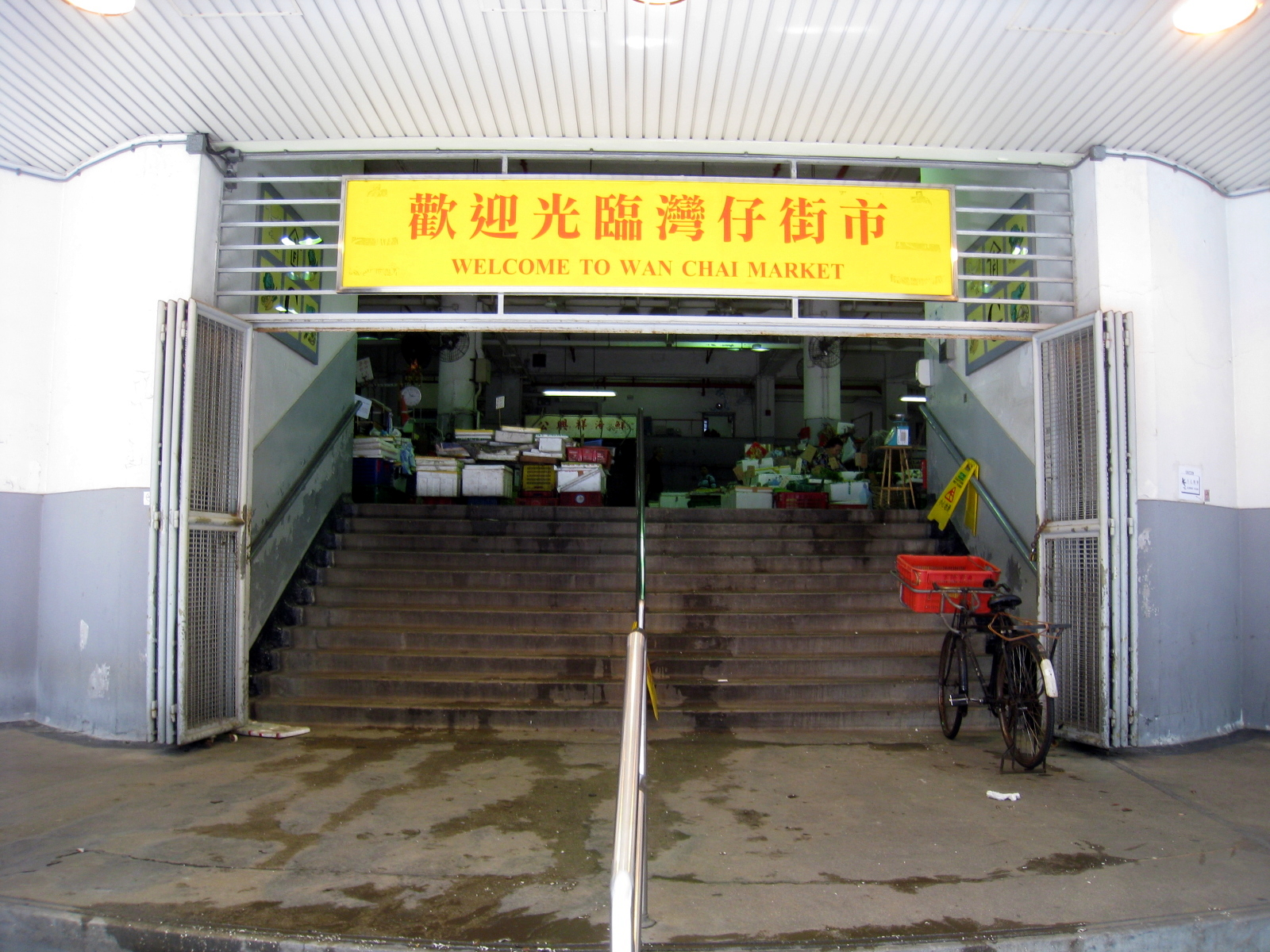
Wan Chai Market Main Entrance

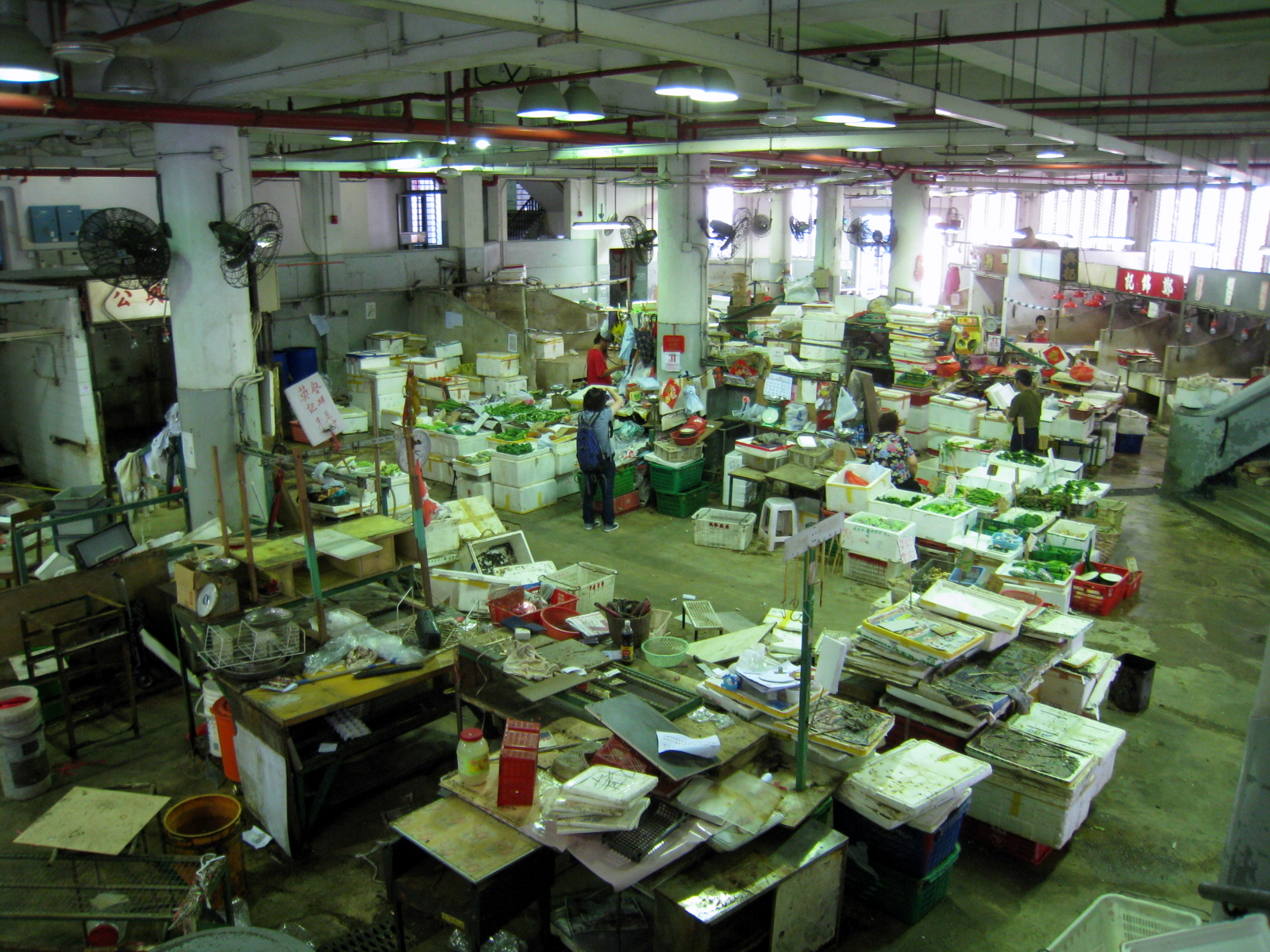
Wan Chai Market Ground Floor Interior

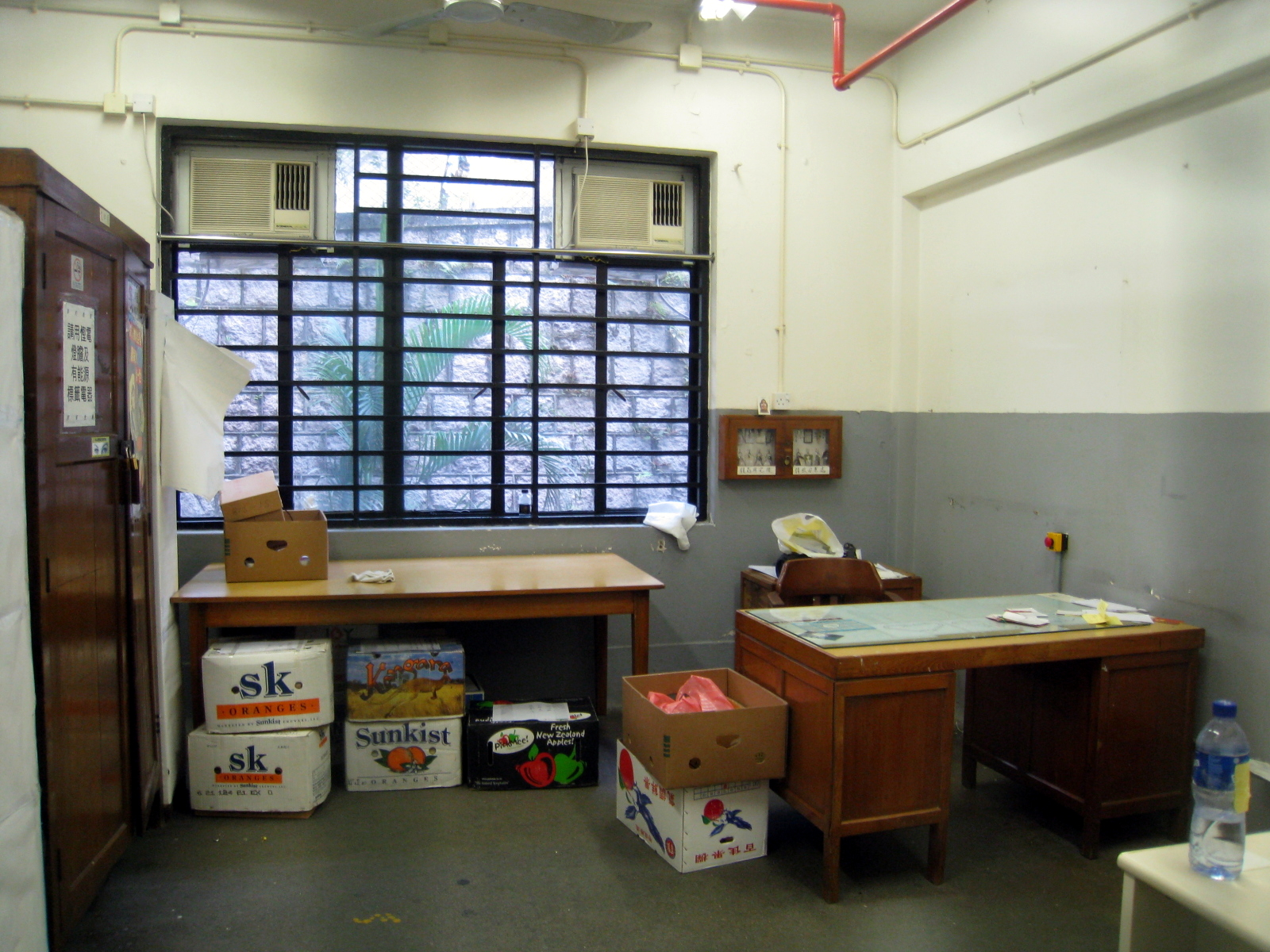
Wan Chai Market Office

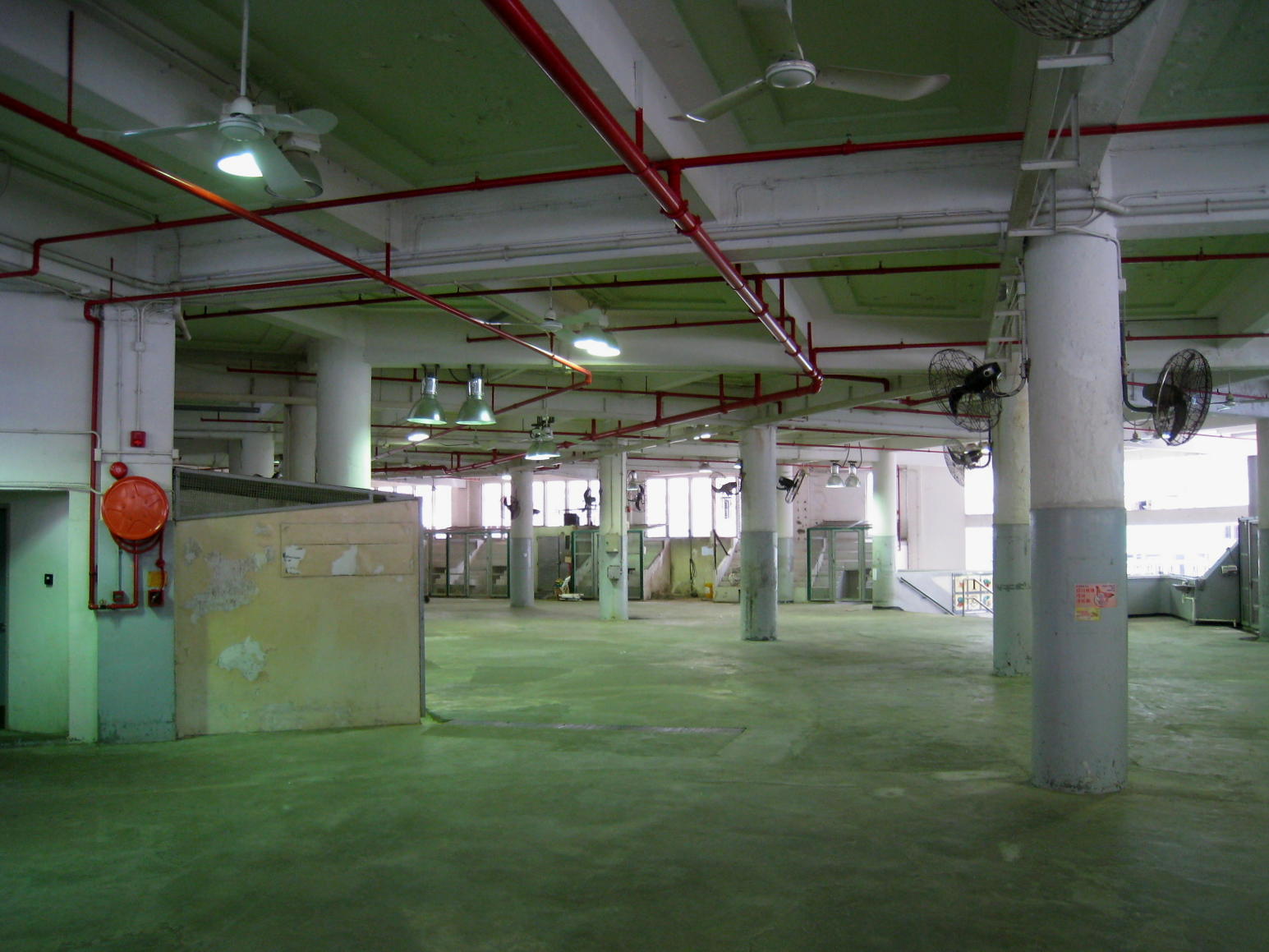
All the stores have been vacant since August 2008

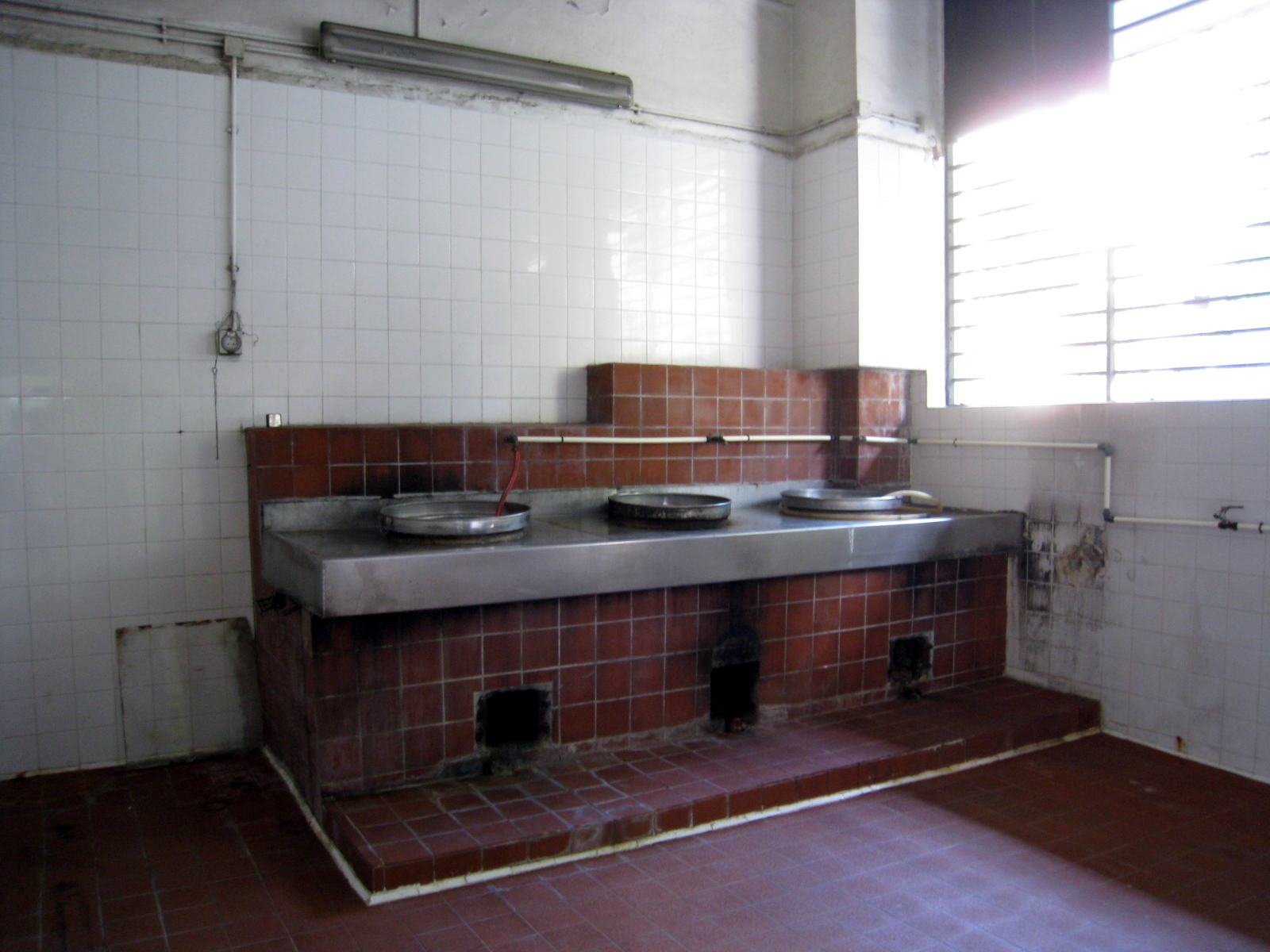
Wan Chai Market Level 1

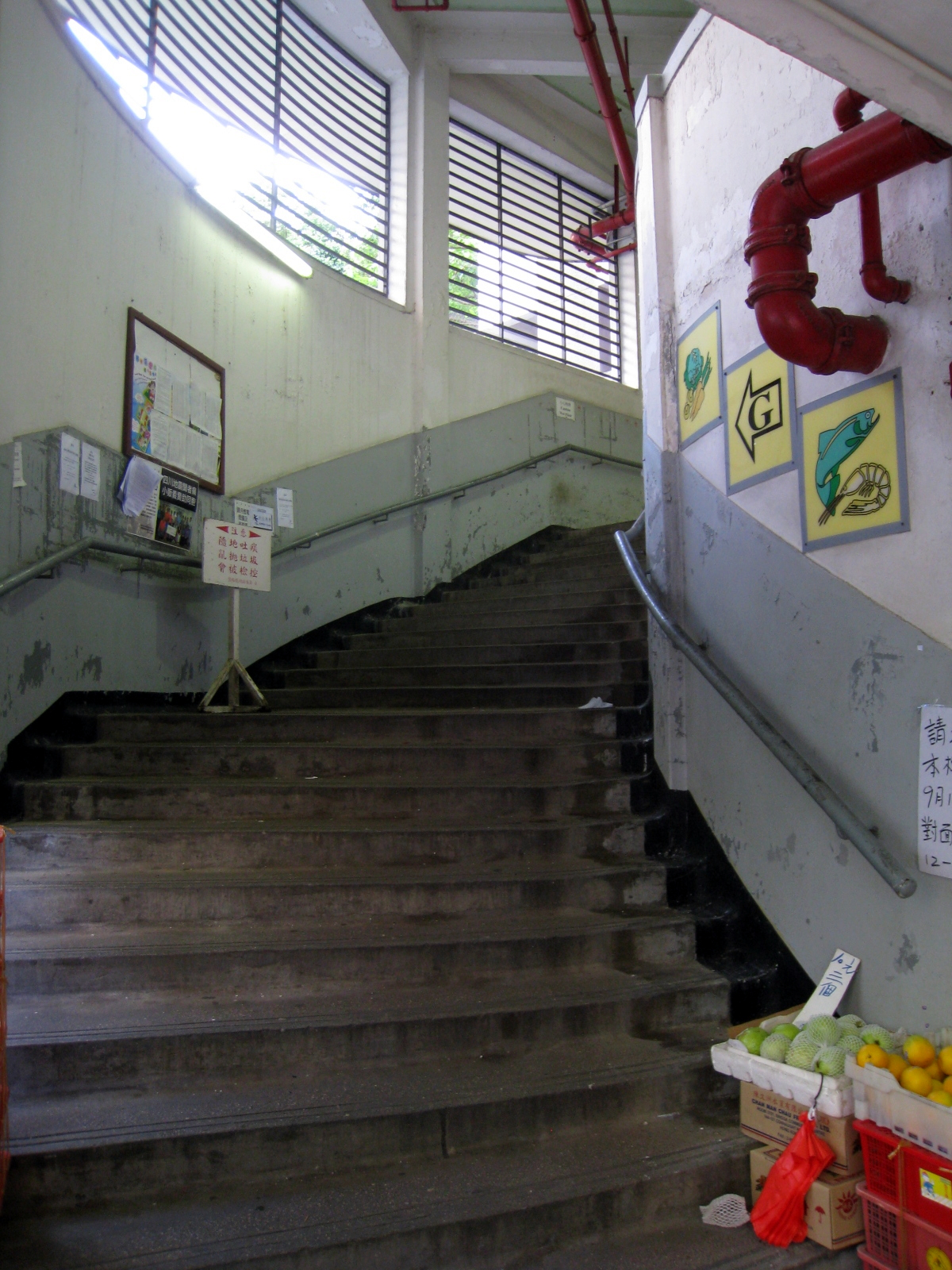
Stairs in Wan Chai Market

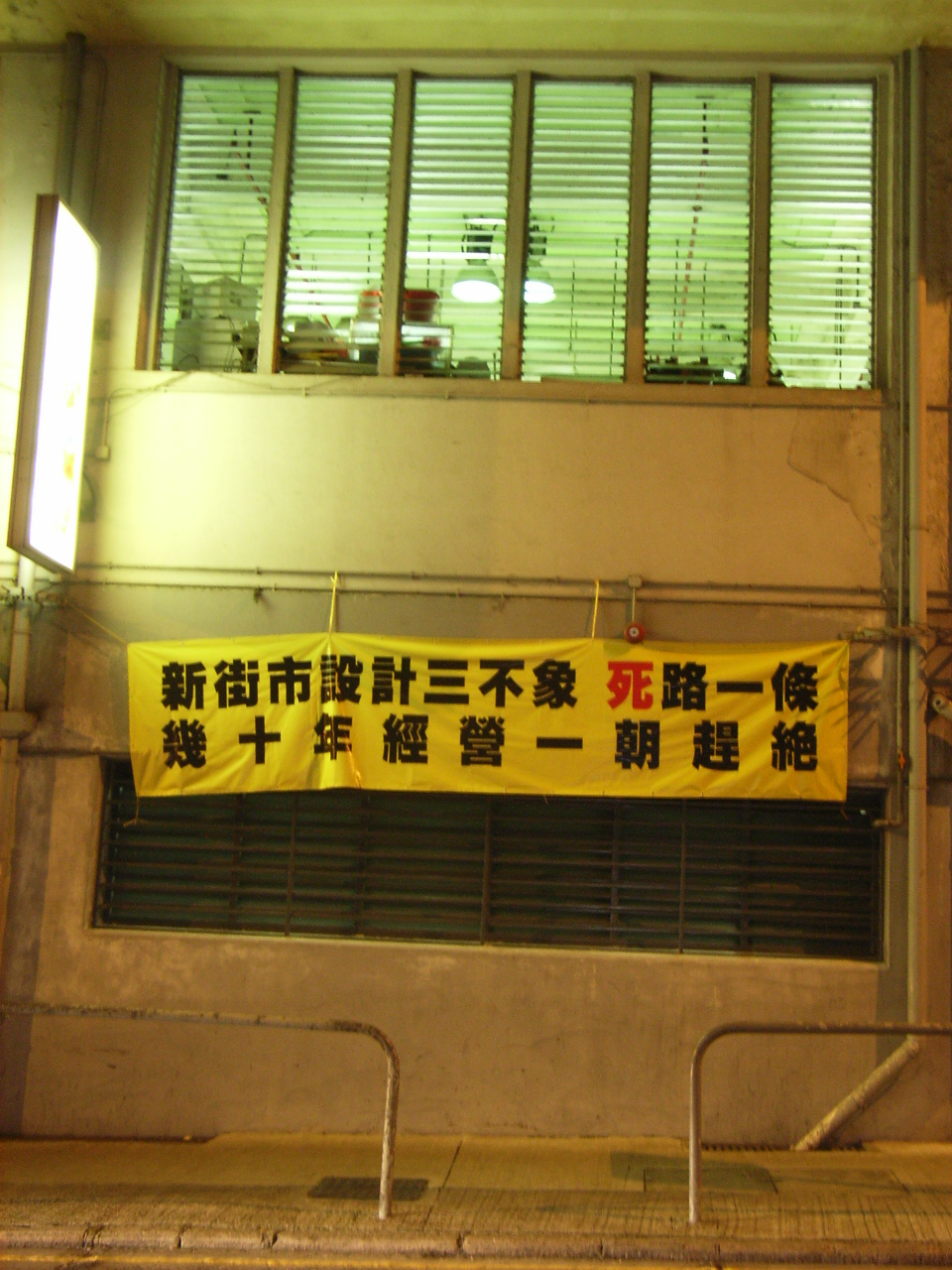
The banner against the removal of the market

== See also ==
- Wan Chai Heritage Trail
- Central Market, Hong Kong
