= Liquor Licensing Board (Hong Kong) =

- 酒牌局

Licensing body overview
- Jurisdiction: Hong Kong
- Headquarters: Room 106, 1/F, 258 Queen's Road East, Wan Chai
- Minister responsible: James WONG Kong-tin, Chairman
- Deputy Minister responsible: Winnie FAN Chui-wah, Vice-Chairman
- Parent department: Food and Environmental Hygiene Department
- Key document: Dutiable Commodities (Liquor) Regulations, Cap. 109B
- Website: Official website

Liquor Licensing Board
- Traditional Chinese: 酒牌局
Transcriptions
Yue: Cantonese
- Yale Romanization: Jáu pàaih guhk
- Jyutping: Zau^{2} paai^{4} guk^{6}

The Liquor Licensing Board (Chinese: 酒牌局, LLB) is the licensing body for the sale of alcohol in Hong Kong. LLB is responsible for licensing and not retail sales. In line with Hong Kong law, alcohol can be sold freely in licensed retail stores in Hong Kong.

== History ==
The LLB was created to replace the licensing boards formerly organised under the Urban Council and Regional Council, which were disbanded at the end of 1999.

== Management ==
The LLB is governed by a board that consists of a chair, vice-chair and nine appointed board members. The agency is under the jurisdiction of the Food and Environmental Hygiene Department. Members of the board are appointed by the Chief Executive of Hong Kong.

== Enforcement ==
Laws enforced by the LLB include:

- Dutiable Commodities Ordinance, Cap 109
  - Cap 109 B Regulations 17
- Dutible Commodities (Liquor) Regulations

== See also ==
- Alcohol laws in Hong Kong
