= Wan Chai Heritage Trail =

Heritage trail in Hong Kong

Coordinates: 22.2775°N 114.1770°E

- Traditional Chinese: 灣仔歷史文物徑
- Simplified Chinese: 湾仔历史文物径
Transcriptions
Standard Mandarin
- Hanyu Pinyin: Wān Zǎi Lìshǐ Wénwùjìng
Yue: Cantonese
- Jyutping: waan1 zai2 lik6 si2 man4 mat6 ging3

The Wan Chai Heritage Trail (Chinese: 灣仔歷史文物徑) is a walking trail in Hong Kong. It was launched on 27 September 2009 and is two hours in duration. It was formed by the Old Wan Chai Revitalisation Initiatives Special Committee (OWCRISC) established by the Development Bureau to promote the local culture, history and architectural style of Wan Chai District.

At present the trail features 15 sites, including the Blue House, Wan Chai Market, Nam Koo Terrace and the Starstreet Precinct. In 2009, at the trail's launch, nine of these properties were undergoing restoration through projects organised by the Urban Renewal Authority and the Development Bureau. It was expected that the buildings would once again be fully operational in 2013–16; meanwhile visitors could observe many of the external architectural features of the sites on this trail.

== List of sites ==
The Trail is divided into two parts: Architectural Heritage Trail and Cultural Heritage Trail.

=== Architectural Heritage Trail ===
- Green House, tong-lau (shophouse), at Nos. 1–11, Mallory Street and Nos. 4–12 Burrows Street
- Hong Kong Tuberculosis, Chest and Heart Diseases Association, part of the Ruttonjee Hospital, No. 266 Queen's Road East, Bauhaus architectural style
- Wan Chai Market, at No. 264 Queen's Road East and Stone Nullah Lane, Streamline Moderne architectural style
- Blue House, Nos. 72-74A Stone Nullah Lane
- Yellow House, Nos. 2–4 Hing Wan Street
- Nos. 186–190 Queen's Road East, tong-laus
- "The Pawn", Nos. 60–66 Johnston Road, tong-laus
- OVOlogue, Nos. 66 Johnston Road, tong-lau
- No. 18 Ship Street, tong-lau
- Nam Koo Terrace, No. 55 Ship Street
- Starstreet Precinct, including No. 31 Wing Fung Street

=== Cultural Heritage Trail ===
- Pak Tai Temple, No. 2 Lung on Street, near the upper end of Stone Nullah Lane
- Old Wan Chai Post Office, No. 221 Queen's Road East
- Open Market in Tai Yuen Street and Cross Street
- Hung Shing Temple, Nos. 129–131 Queen's Road East
- Open Market in Gresson Street

== See also ==
- Heritage Trails in Hong Kong
