= Hung Shing Temple, Wan Chai =

Temple in Wan Chai, Hong Kong

Coordinates: 22.275431°N 114.170831°E

Hung Shing Temple
- 洪聖古廟
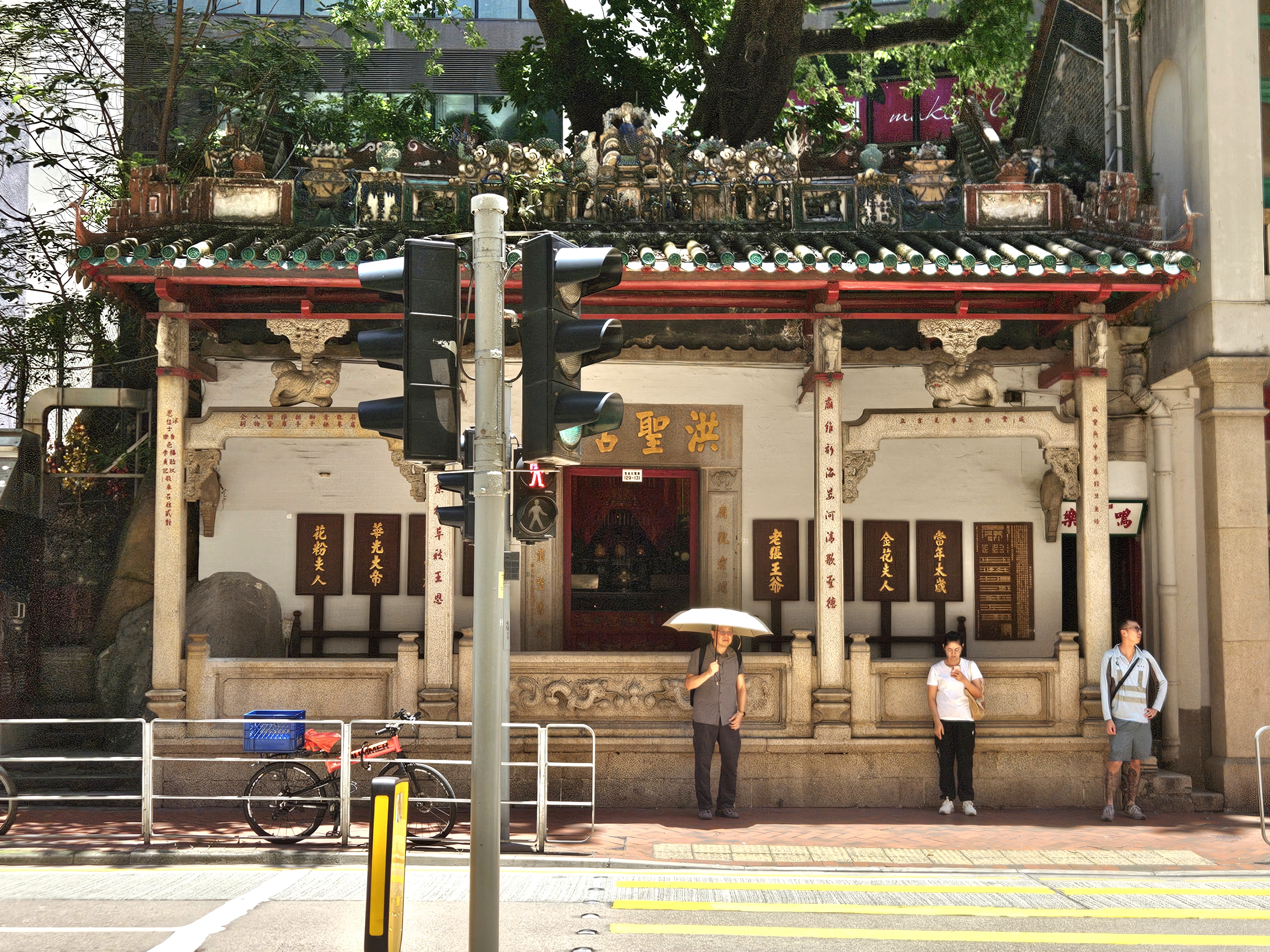
- Hung Shing Temple, Wan Chai

Religion
- Affiliation: Chinese folk religion
- District: Wan Chai
- Deity: Hung Shing
- Festival: Birthday of Kwun Yum
- Governing body: Tung Wah Group of Hospitals

Location
- Country: Hong Kong
- Interactive map of Hung Shing Temple

Architecture
- Established: circa 1847

Hung Shing Temple, Wan Chai
- Traditional Chinese: 洪聖古廟
Transcriptions
Yue: Cantonese
- Yale Romanization: Hùhng sing gú miuh
- Jyutping: Hung4 sing3 gu2 miu6

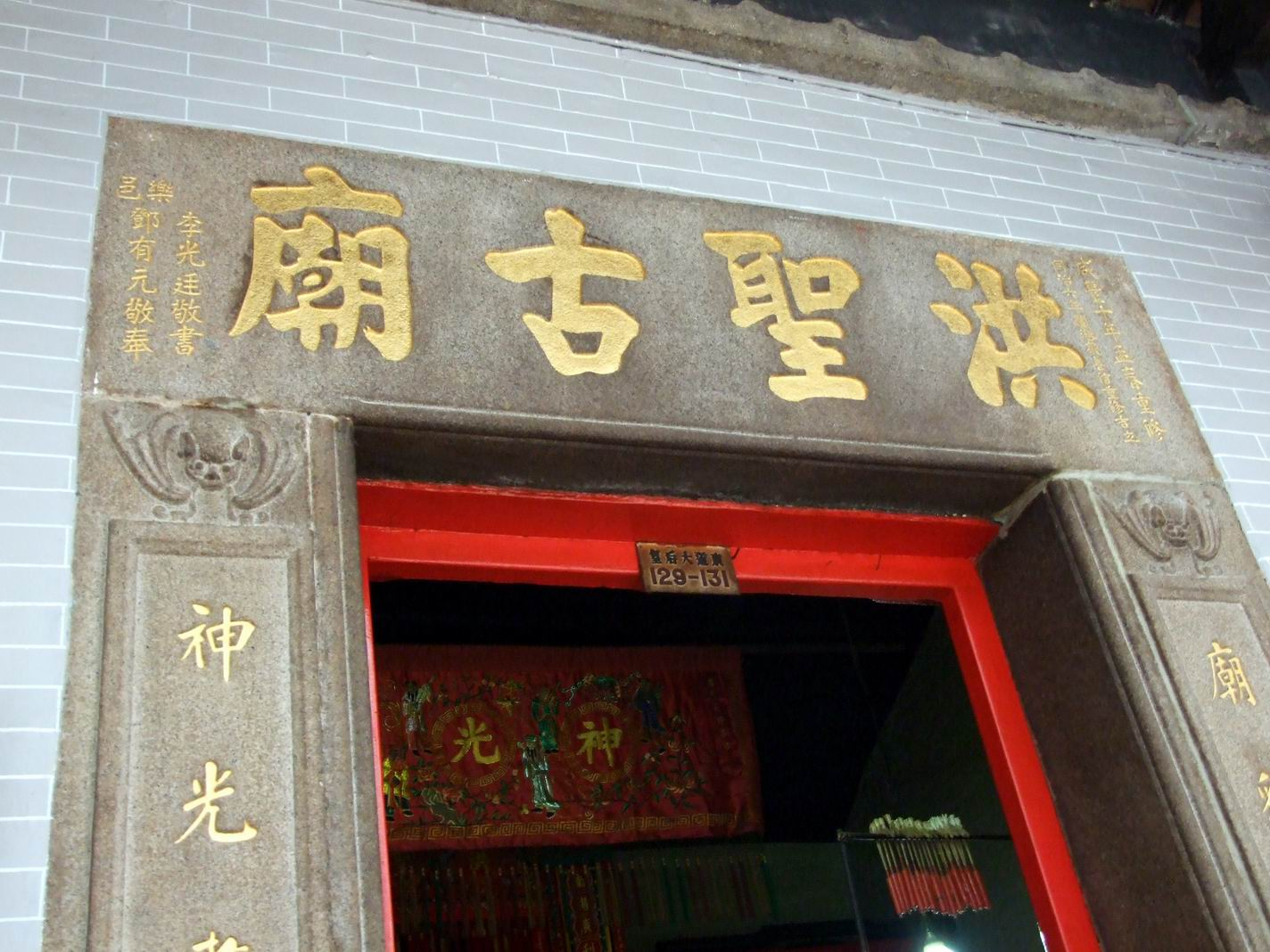
Portal

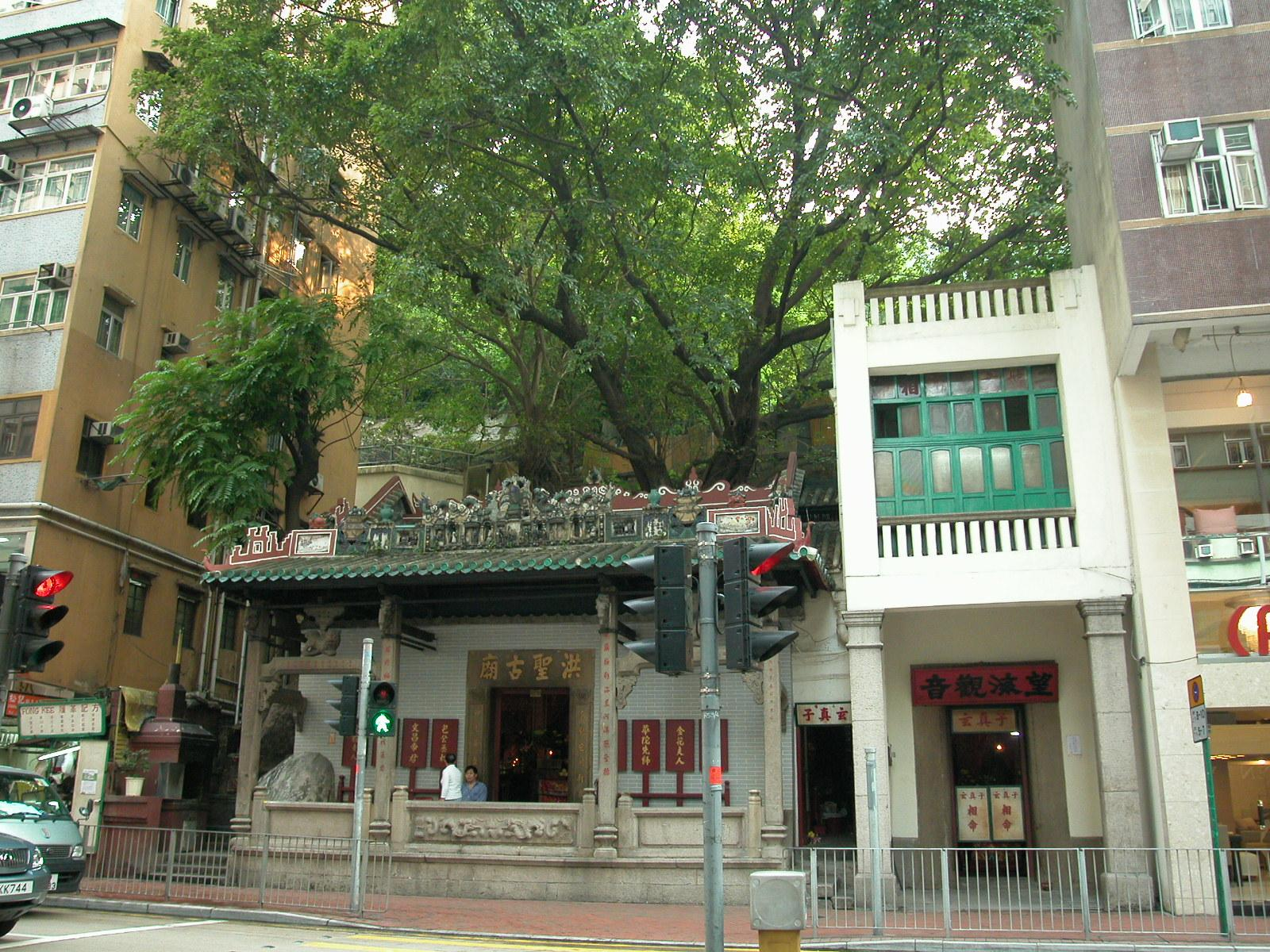
Hung Shing Temple in Queen's Road East. The white building on the right houses a Kwun Yum temple, added in 1867. The first floor with a green window is a later addition.

The Hung Shing Temple in Wan Chai, Hong Kong, is one of the forty-two temples dedicated to Hung Shing in the Hong Kong.

== Location ==
The temple is located at Nos. 129–131 Queen's Road East, Wan Chai. Tai Wong Street West and Tai Wong Street East intersect with Queen's Road East across the street from the temple. The two streets derive their name from the temple, as "Tai Wong" is an alternate name for Hung Shing. The temple was originally built next to the shoreline, facing the sea, but as the consequence of successive land reclamations, it is now surrounded by clusters of residential and commercial buildings.

== History ==
The temple was probably built in 1847 and may have existed previously as a shrine. Renovations were recorded to have been carried out in 1857, 1860, 1867, 1949 and 1992. An annexe Kwun Yum temple was constructed to its left in 1867.

== Features ==
The temple was built with boulders from the hillside and its right portion and back are sitting on rocks. It is a simple one-hall building with a granite platform right in front of its façade. The roof of the platform is supported by elaborate granite columns and accessing staircases are built on either ends rather than in the middle facing the temple entrance. The ceramic decorations of Shiwan kiln on the roof date from 1909. Together with Hung Shing, other deities worshiped there include Madame Kam Fa (金花娘娘), Pau Kung and Shing Wong.

== Conservation ==
The management of the Temple has been delegated to the Tung Wah Group of Hospitals by the Chinese Temples Committee since pre-war times. It has been listed as a Grade I historic building since 1987 and it is part of the Wan Chai Heritage Trail, established in 2009.

== Festivals ==
Worshippers of Hung Shing go to pray in the temple on the 1st and the 15th day of every lunar month and on the birthday of Kwun Yum, the Goddess of Mercy.
