= Alcohol laws of Hong Kong =

The alcohol laws of Hong Kong are consistent with those of most common law jurisdictions. It was strict when compared to China (prior to 2006) and Macau (prior to 2023) where there was no legal drinking age.

== Alcohol sales ==
Alcohol is available at licensed restaurants (any size), bars, clubs and many food retailers (mostly supermarkets). The Liquor Licensing Board of Hong Kong is responsible for licensing of alcohol serving establishments.

== For consumption on-premises ==
The sale of liquor on a premises for consumption on that premises is not subject to any restriction on sale hours unless a special condition limiting hours is imposed by the Liquor Licensing Board on the liquor licence Cap 109 B laws of Hong Kong reg 17.

There are further restrictions if the premises are employing persons under the drinking age therein as to when they can work. There is no age restriction on drinking at a private residence or on drinking age at locations that are not the subject of liquor licenses. No licensee shall permit any person under the age of 18 years to drink any intoxicating liquor on any licensed premises - under Regulation 28.

== Drinking age ==
There is no legal drinking age set in Hong Kong, however, with the effect of the "Dutiable Commodities (Amendment) Ordinance 2018" (Cap. 109 Hong Kong Law) since 30 November 2018, sale or supply of alcohol / intoxicating liquor to minors (aged below 18) in the course of business is prohibited. The maximum fine for selling or supplying intoxicating liquor to a minor, or selling intoxicating liquor via vending machines, is HK$50,000 on summary conviction. Those who obstruct inspectors during enforcement are liable to a maximum fine of HK$10,000 on summary conviction.

== Drink driving ==
The law against what is known as drink driving, impaired driving in Hong Kong is strictly enforced. Prescribed limit is 50 mg of alcohol in 100 ml of blood, 67 mg of alcohol in 100 ml of urine, or 22 μg of alcohol in 100 ml of breath.

With effect from 9 February 2009, police officers in uniform can require a person who is driving or attempting to drive a vehicle on a road to conduct a breath test without the need for reasonable suspicion. In the new random breath test operations, the Police will use pre-screening devices to conduct the test to reduce delay and inconvenience to drivers.

Fines for drivers found impaired:

- Maximum fine of HK$25,000 and imprisonment for 3 years
- Disqualification from driving for not less than 6 months on first conviction and not less than 2 years on second or subsequent conviction
- Mandated to attend a driving improvement course
- Incur 10 driving offence points

(The same penalty applies for failing to provide specimens for breath, blood or urine tests without reasonable excuse).

Source: Hong Kong e-Legislation
