= Nunavut Liquor and Cannabis Board =

The Nunavut Liquor and Cannabis Board is an agency of the government of the Canadian territory of Nunavut. Established as a quasi-judicial tribunal under Part I of the Nunavut Liquor Act, the Board is responsible for issuing special occasion permits along with liquor and cannabis licenses. The Board also has the authority to revoke the licenses of entities that are in violation of liquor and cannabis regulations.

The first chairman of the board was Goo Arlooktoo, of Iqaluit, who had been a member of the Northwest Territories legislative assembly and was deputy premier for four years. Since October 21, 2021, Lorne Kusugak has served as the minister of the board.

== See also ==
- Nunavut Liquor and Cannabis Commission
