= Liquor Licensing Board (Northwest Territories) =

The NWT Liquor Licensing Board regulates: Liquor sales and service in restaurants, bars, and special events; Liquor manufacturers, and Liquor service and sales at special occasion events.

The Liquor Licensing Board is a regulatory and quasi-judicial administrative tribunal that is independent from government. The Board administers several parts of the NWT Liquor Act and the NWT Liquor Regulations.
