= Queen's Road East =

Street in Wan Chai, Hong Kong

Coordinates: 22.275942°N 114.170351°E

- Traditional Chinese: 皇后大道東
- Simplified Chinese: 皇后大道东
Transcriptions
Standard Mandarin
- Hanyu Pinyin: Huánghòu Dàdào Dōng
Yue: Cantonese
- Yale Romanization: Wòhng hauh daaih douh dūng
- Jyutping: Wong4 hau6 daai6 dou6 dung1

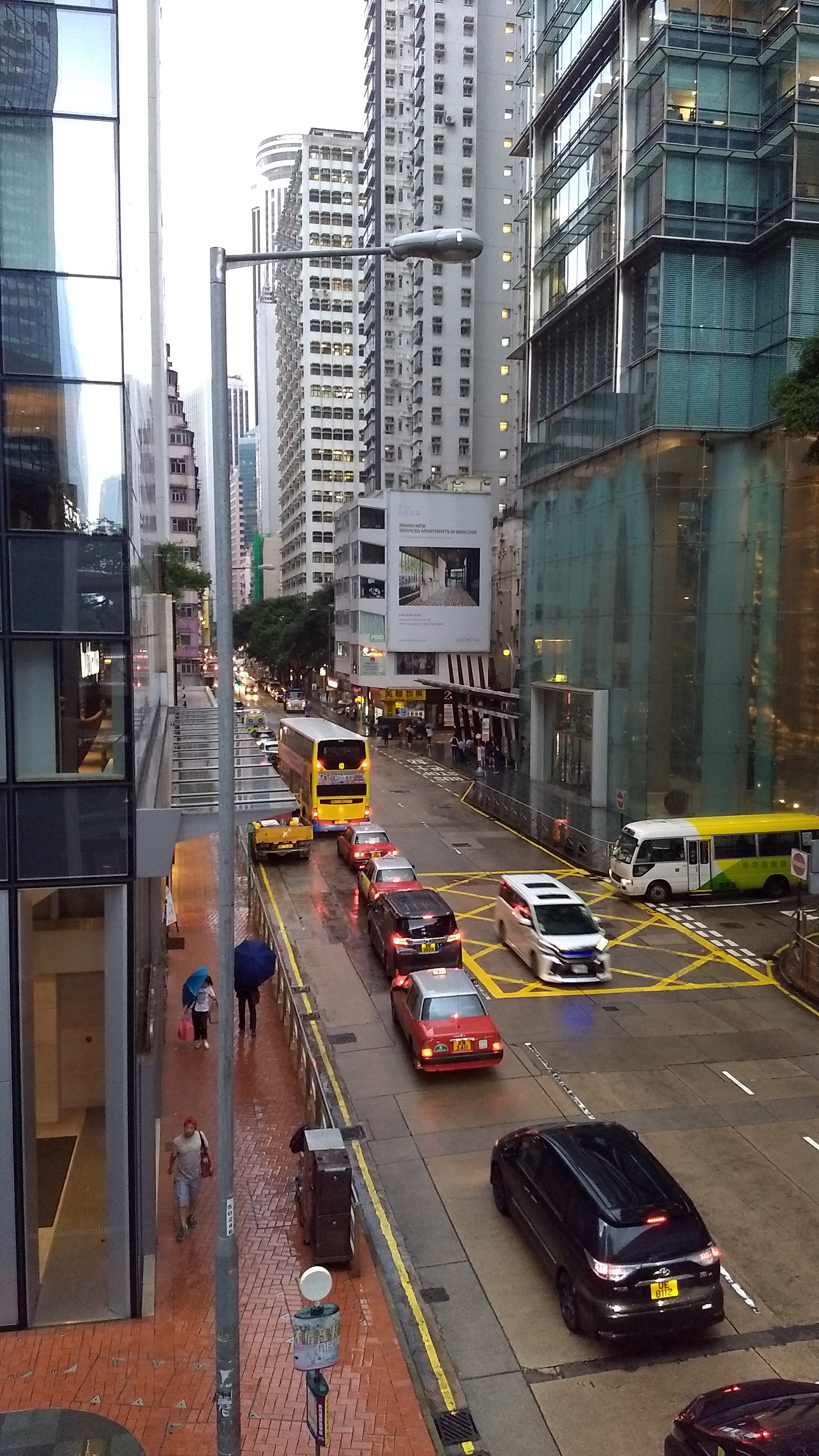
Western end of Queen's Road East, viewed from the overpass. Three Pacific Place is on the right. Hopewell Centre is visible in the distance.

Queen's Road East (Chinese: 皇后大道東; Jyutping: wong4 hau6 daai6 dou6 dung1) is a street in Wan Chai, in the north of Hong Kong Island, Hong Kong, connecting Admiralty in the west to Happy Valley in the east. Queen's Road East is one of the four sections of Queen's Road, and historically included Queensway.

== Location ==
Queen's Road East forks to the south from Queensway near Justice Drive, where Queensway turns into Hennessy Road. It runs along the old northern shoreline of Hong Kong Island. It ends in the east at Wong Nai Chung Road in Happy Valley.

== History ==
The settlement of Wan Chai began in pre-British times as a small Chinese community around the present Hung Shing Temple on Queen's Road East. The temple was probably built in 1847 and may have existed previously as a shrine. Originally built next to the shoreline, facing the sea, it is now surrounded by clusters of residential and commercial buildings, as the consequence of successive land reclamation.

Queen's Road East was first developed into a European commercial and residential centre after the arrival of the British in 1841. It had become a mainly Chinese residential, labouring and shop-keeping community by the 1860s.

The eastern part of the road was cut through Morrison Hill, which formerly separated Wanchai from Happy Valley. This section was known as 'Gap Road'. That name was still in use around 1930, even though the high land to the north of the 'gap' was levelled in the 1920s and the materials used to reclaim land from the harbour, under the Praya East Reclamation Scheme.

Although associated with Queen's Road Central and Queen's Road West, the name 'Queen's Road East' has been in use since at least the 1870s.

== North side features ==
The following list follows a west-east order along the north side of the street, including intersecting streets, buildings and other features. Most streets and lanes having a northern junction with Queen's Road East connect with Johnston Road, located northward. The exceptions are Anton Street, McGregor Street and Wood Road. Since Queen's Road East runs mostly along the original shoreline of Hong Kong Island, these streets have been built on early land reclamation.

=== Queensway – Hennessy Road interection ===
The western end of Queens Road East originates and runs southeast from the main Queensway – Hennessy Road artery at the point where the name changes from Queensway (to the west) to Hennsessy Road to the east.

=== Generali Tower ===
Generali Tower 忠利集團大廈 is an 18-storey office building. It is the first building on the northern side of the street, at nos. 6–10. It was formerly Sincere Insurance Building (先施保險大廈) The building was completed on 1 January 1968, with a major renovation in 2011–13, after which it was called the Generali Building. The west wall is used for advertising.

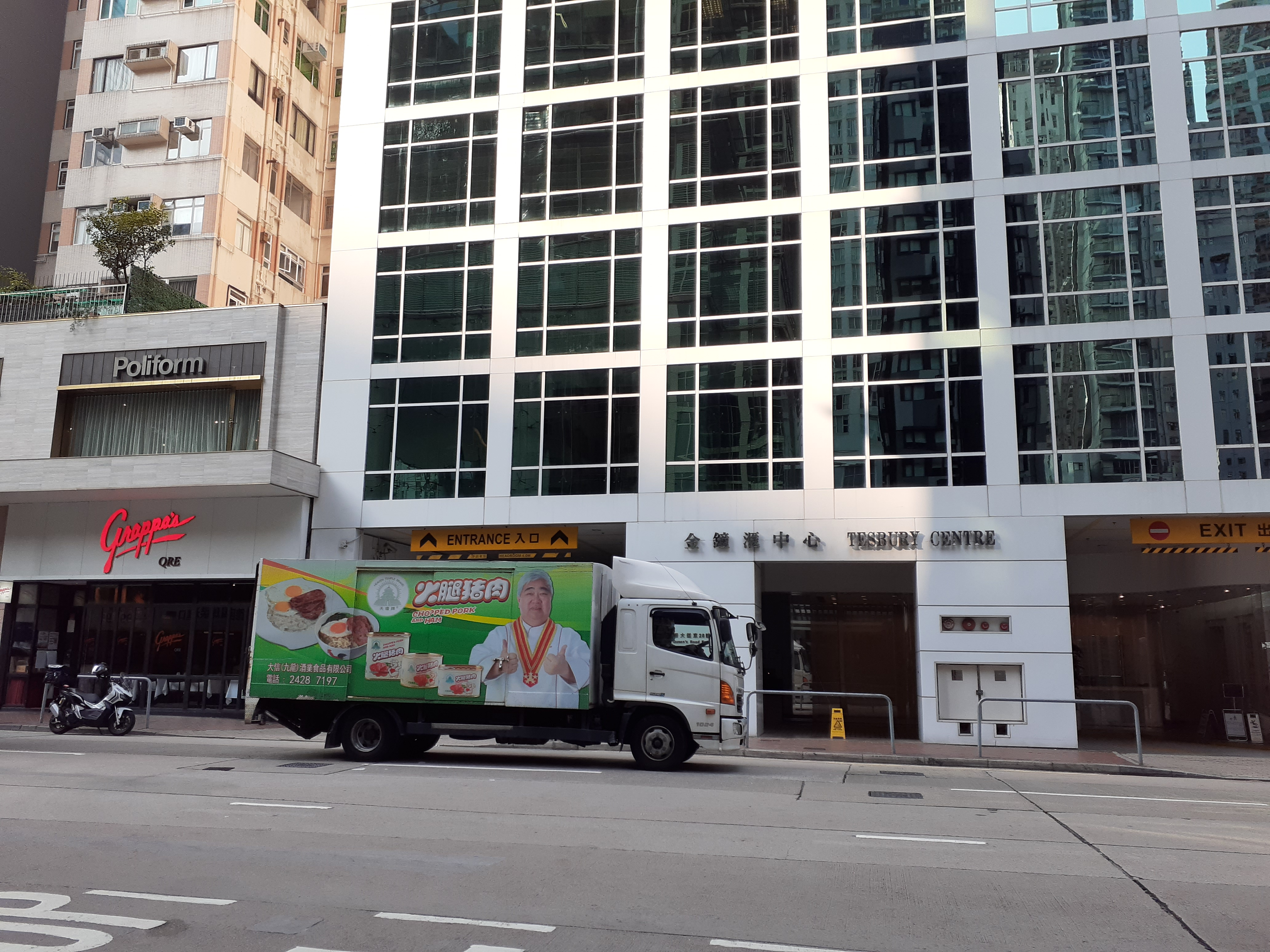
Tesbury Centre

=== Tesbury Centre ===
The Tesbury Centre 金鐘匯中心 is at nos. 24–32. The Tesbury Centre, a 29-storey office building, was developed in 1993 at 28 Queen's Road East.

=== Anton Street ===
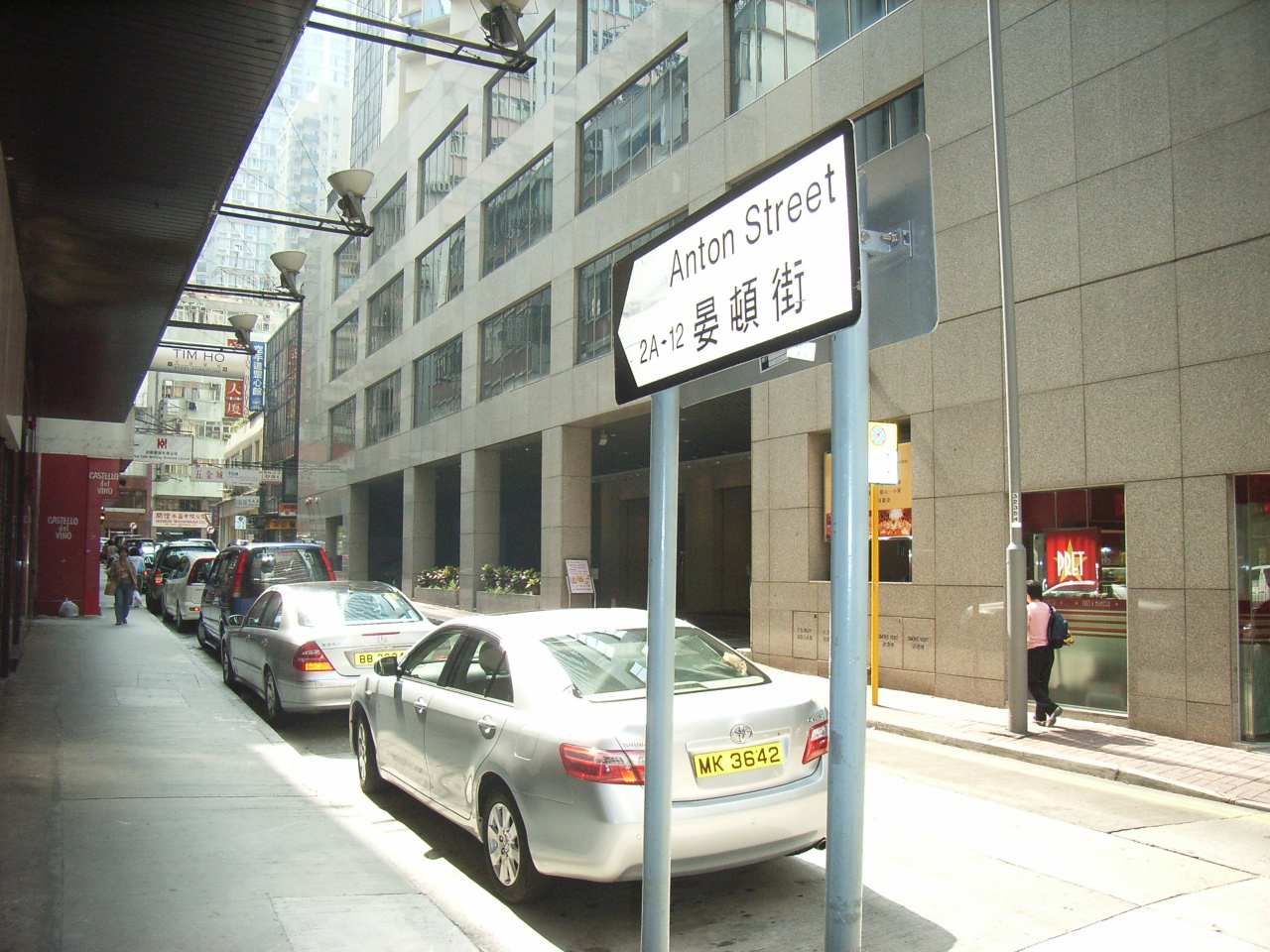
Anton Street

Anton Street (晏頓街) is a short street connecting Queen's Road East to Queensway. The street is on land that Jardine, Matheson & Co. bought from the Sisters of St Paul in 1915. The 1917 annual report of the Public Works Department stated that 47 Chinese houses had been completed on M.L. 23, Praya East, Queen’s Road East, Landale and Anton Streets. Anton Street was named after Charles Edward Anton, a Scottish businessman who served as the 16th Director (tai-pan) of Jardine, Matheson & Co.

=== Six Pacific Place ===
Six Pacific Place (太古廣場六座) is located at the junction of Anton street and Queen's Road East, the sixth phase of Pacific Place. Six Pacific Place comprises 24 levels of office space, totaling approximately 223,000 square feet.

=== Landale Street ===
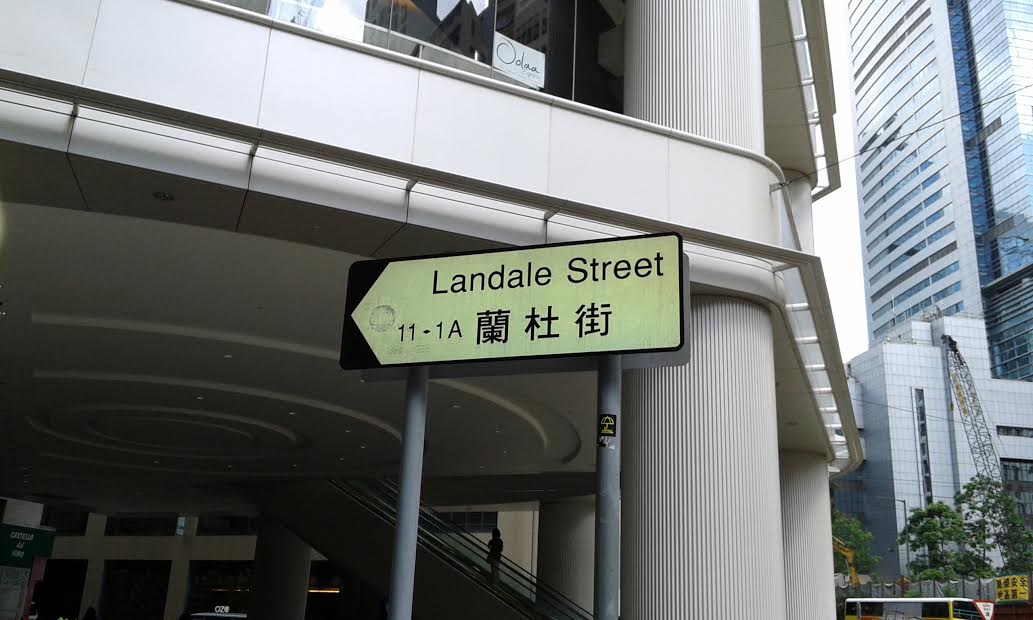
Landale Street

Landale Street (蘭杜街) is a short street running northeast from Queen's Road East to Johnston Road. Jardine, Matheson & Co. bought the land that includes Landale Street in 1915 from the Sisters of Saint Paul. The company built terraced housing on the land. In 1917 Landale Street and Anton street were opened to give access to the housing. The street was named for David Landale, Director of Jardine, Matheson & Co.

=== Li Chit Street ===
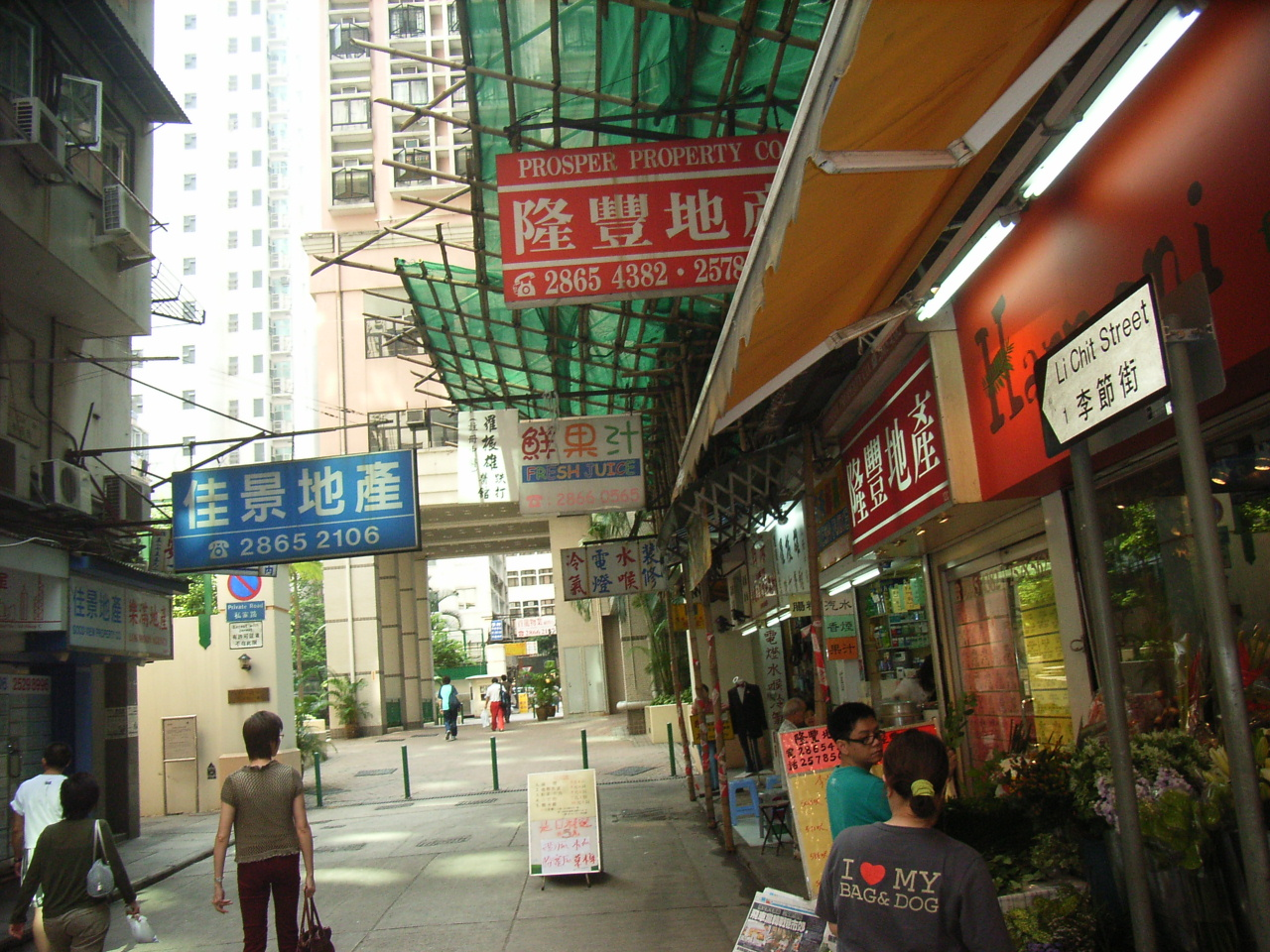
Li Chit Street

Li Chit Street (李節街) is named after Li Chit, of the Li family of Chinese landowners. It was cut as a lane through Marine Lot 25, when that was developed in 1887. In 1919 Li Chit Street became a public street and 30 Chinese houses were built on it. The street has been pedestrianized. The central section is occupied by Li Chit Garden, an apartment tower and green space.

=== Gresson Street ===
Gresson Street runs northeast from Queen's Road East to Johnston Road. Gresson Street was opened around 1909 on Marine Lots 29 and 30, when the lots were redeveloped by Hongkong Land. The street was named after William Jardine Gresson (1869–1934). He was a partner of Jardine, Matheson & Co. from 1901 to 1910. The Open Market in Gresson Street is part of the Wan Chai Heritage Trail.

=== Lun Fat Street ===
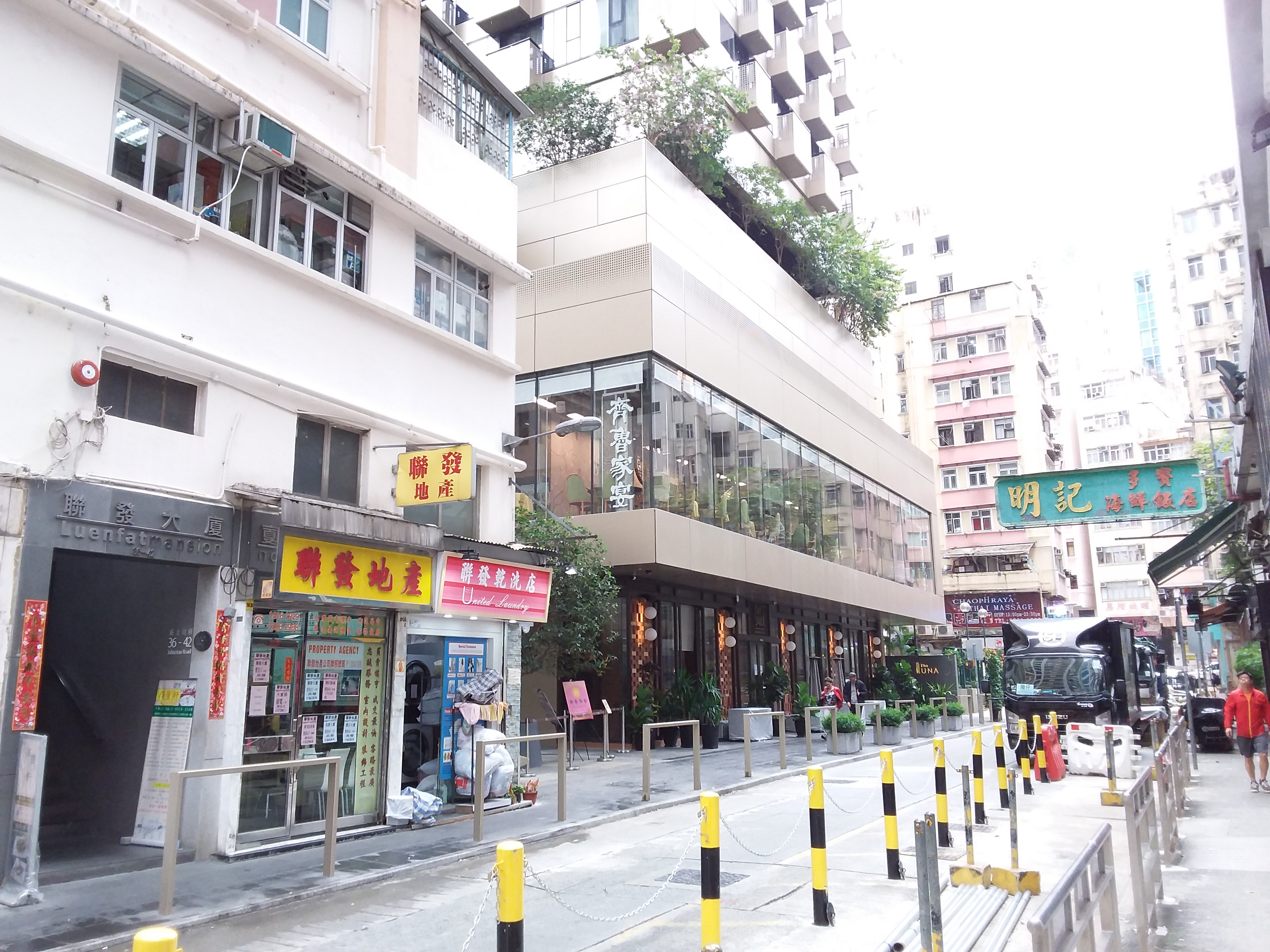
Lun Fat Street

Lun Fat Street (聯發街) runs northeast from Queen's Road East to Johnston Road. The Lan Fat Rest Garden, also known as the Yang Bauhinia Garden, was built on the street in 2003. It is the first community "sitting room" in Wan Chai, and has stone tables and chairs, flowers and children's play areas.

=== Ship Street ===
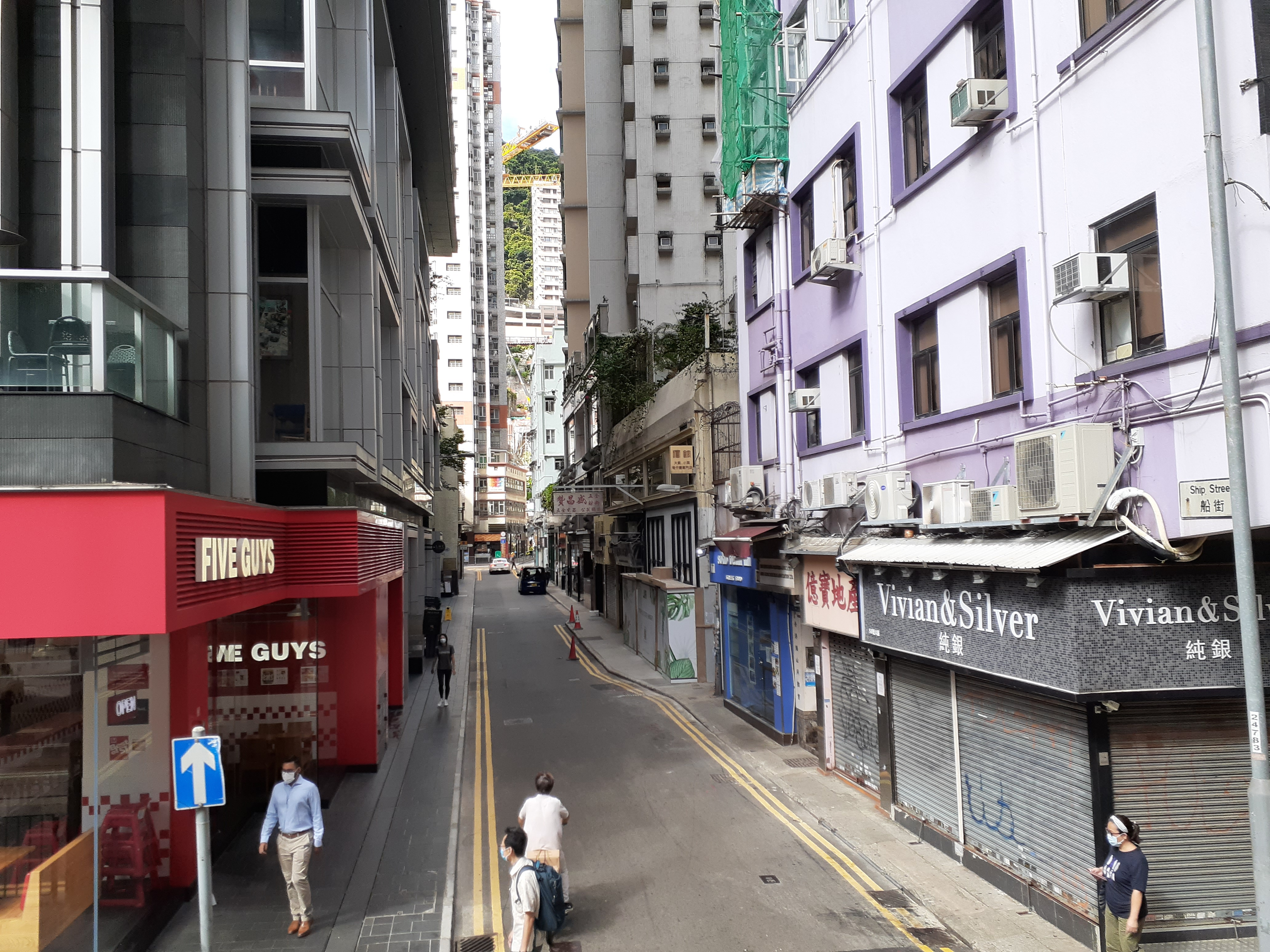
Ship Street

Ship Street crosses Queen's Road East. It runs southwest from Johnston Road to Queen's Road East, then southwest to the Ship Street Garden before turning southeast as a pedestrian road that runs behind the Hung Shing Temple, then southwest to Kennedy Road. The street was originally called Ocean Boat Street, and was opened in 1910. At that time Johnston Road was a dock, and the streets running from it were named after Chinese ports and sea transport. Part of the road north of Queen's Road East is a stairway made of stone slabs.

=== Tai Wong Street West ===
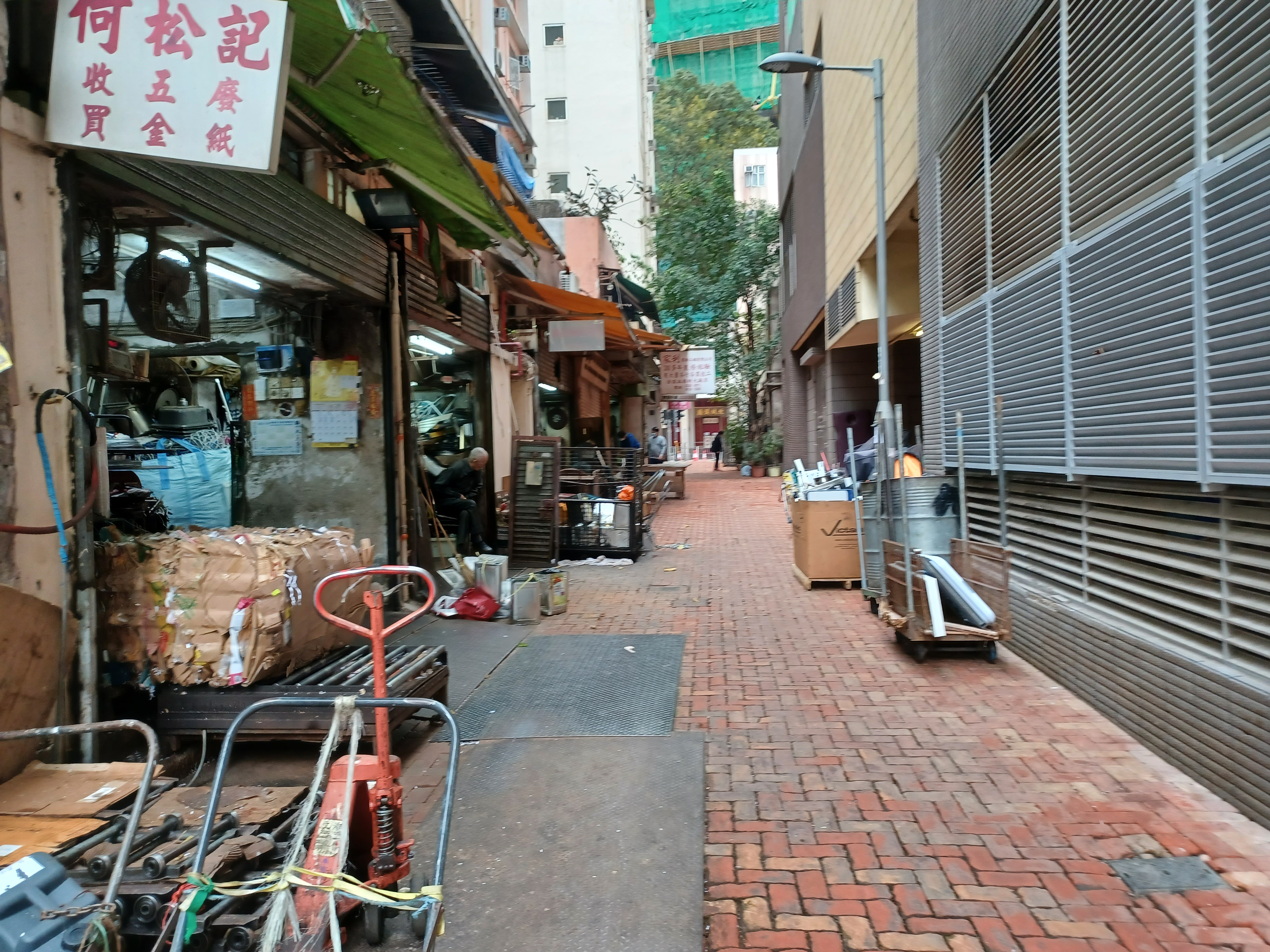
Tai Wong Street West

Tai Wong Street West (大王西街) is a pedestrian road that runs southwest from Johnston Road to Queen's Road East. About halfway along the road it is connected to Tai Wong Street East by the Tai Wong Street East Sitting out Area. The street was originally called Ocean Boat Street, and was opened in 1910. It connects with Queen's Road East opposite Hung Shing Temple. It derives its name from the temple, as "Tai Wong" is an alternate name for Hung Shing.

=== Tai Wong Street East ===
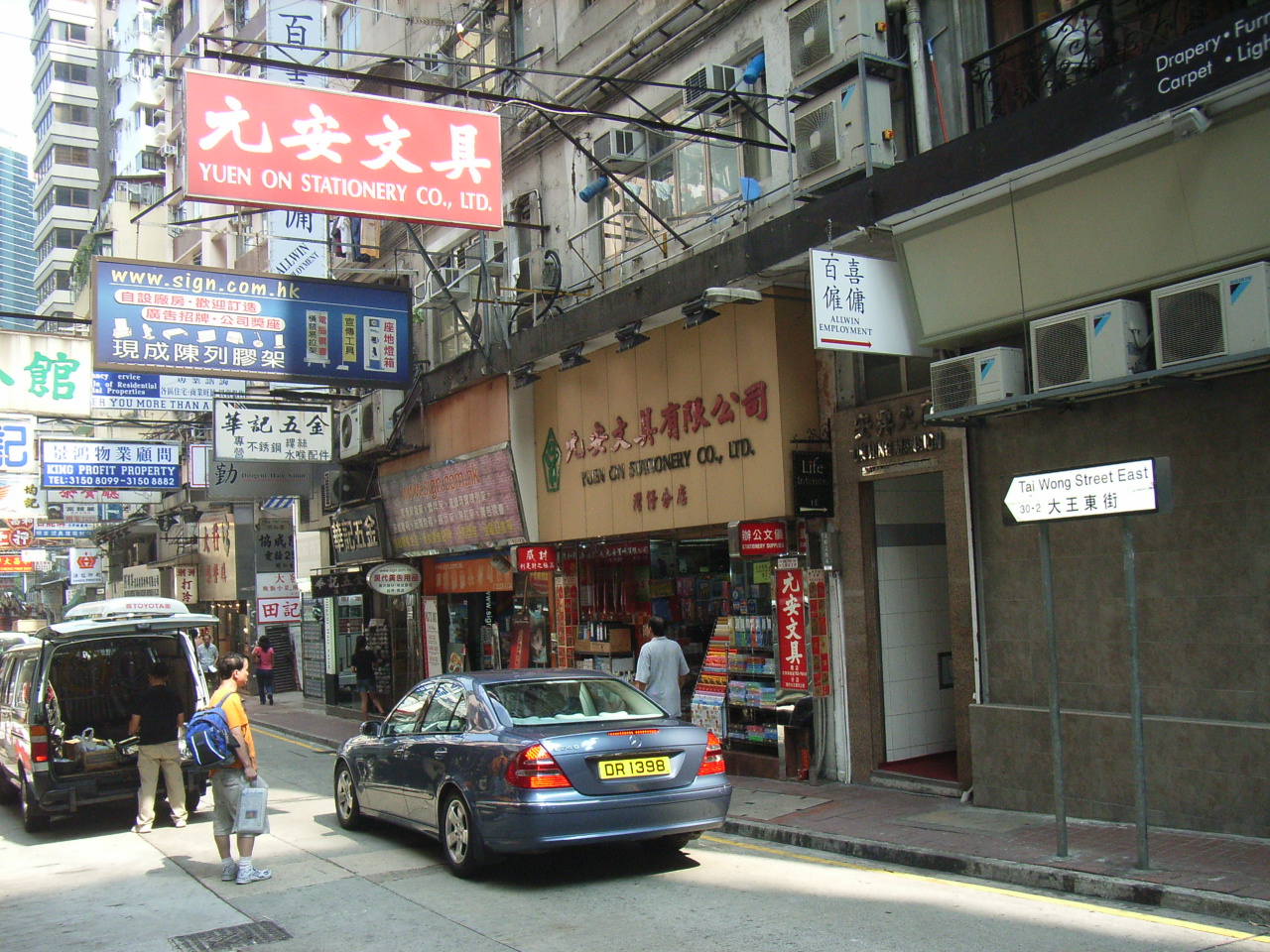
Tai Wong Street East

Tai Wong Street East (大王東街) runs southwest from Johnston Road to Queen's Road East. It joins Queen's Road East across the street from Hung Shing Temple.

=== Swatow Street ===
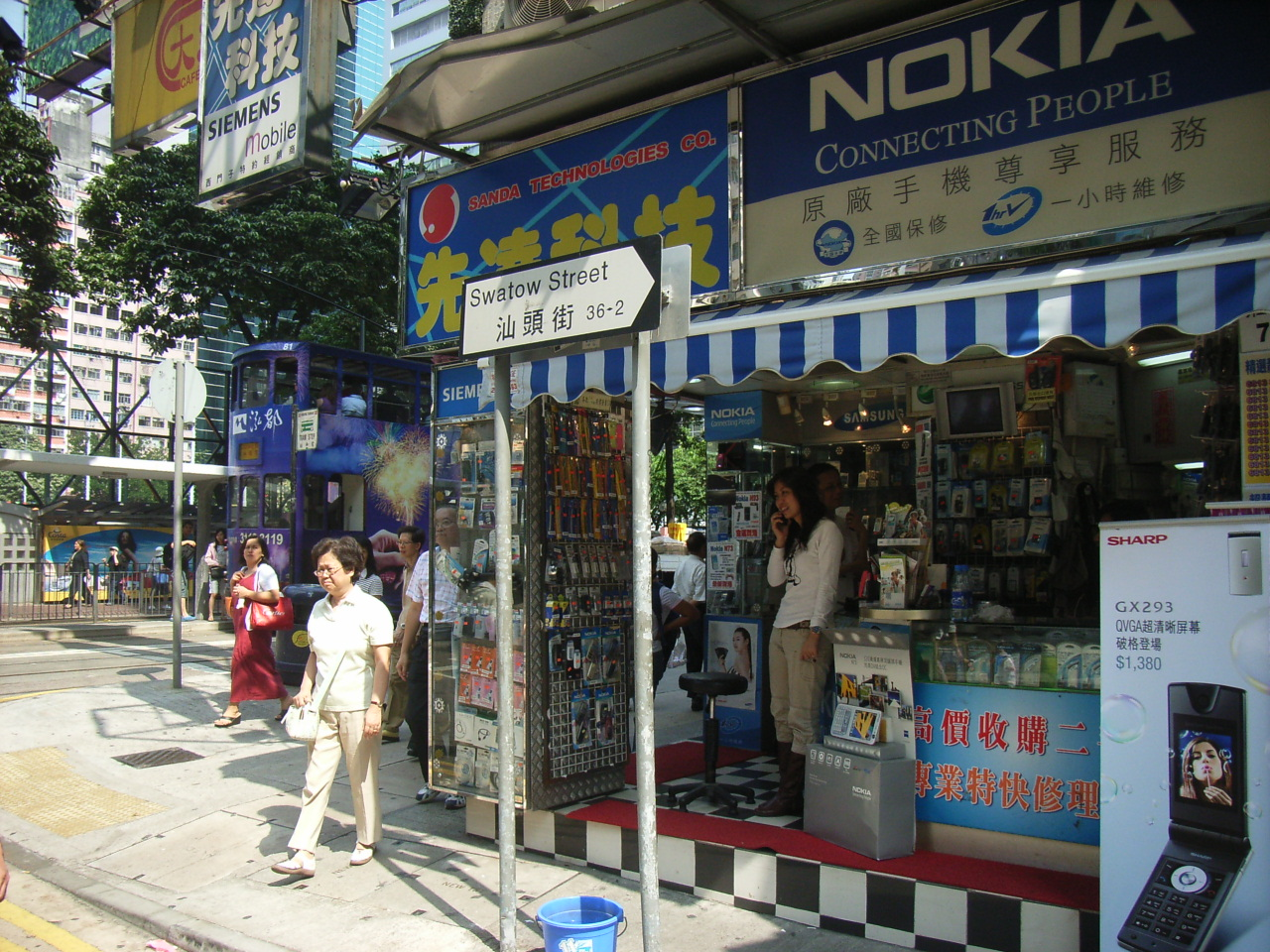
Swatow Street

Swatow Street runs southwest from Johnston Road to Queen's Road East. Swatow is the old name of Shantou, a prefecture-level city on the eastern coast of Guangdong Province, China, and is also the Teochew pronunciation of the city. Swatow Street and Amoy Street to the east are both part of the historical development of the Victoria Harbour coastline. The Victoria Harbour reclamation project moved the original dock area inland, forming many new streets such as Swatow Street and Amoy Street.

=== Amoy Street ===
Amoy Street (Chinese: 廈門街) connects Johnston Road in the north to Queen's Road East in the south. Amoy is an old name of the Chinese city of Xiamen. The street has been described as "shy and retiring" by Time Out because it is a cul-de-sac with steps at one end.

=== Nos. 186–190 Queen's Road East ===
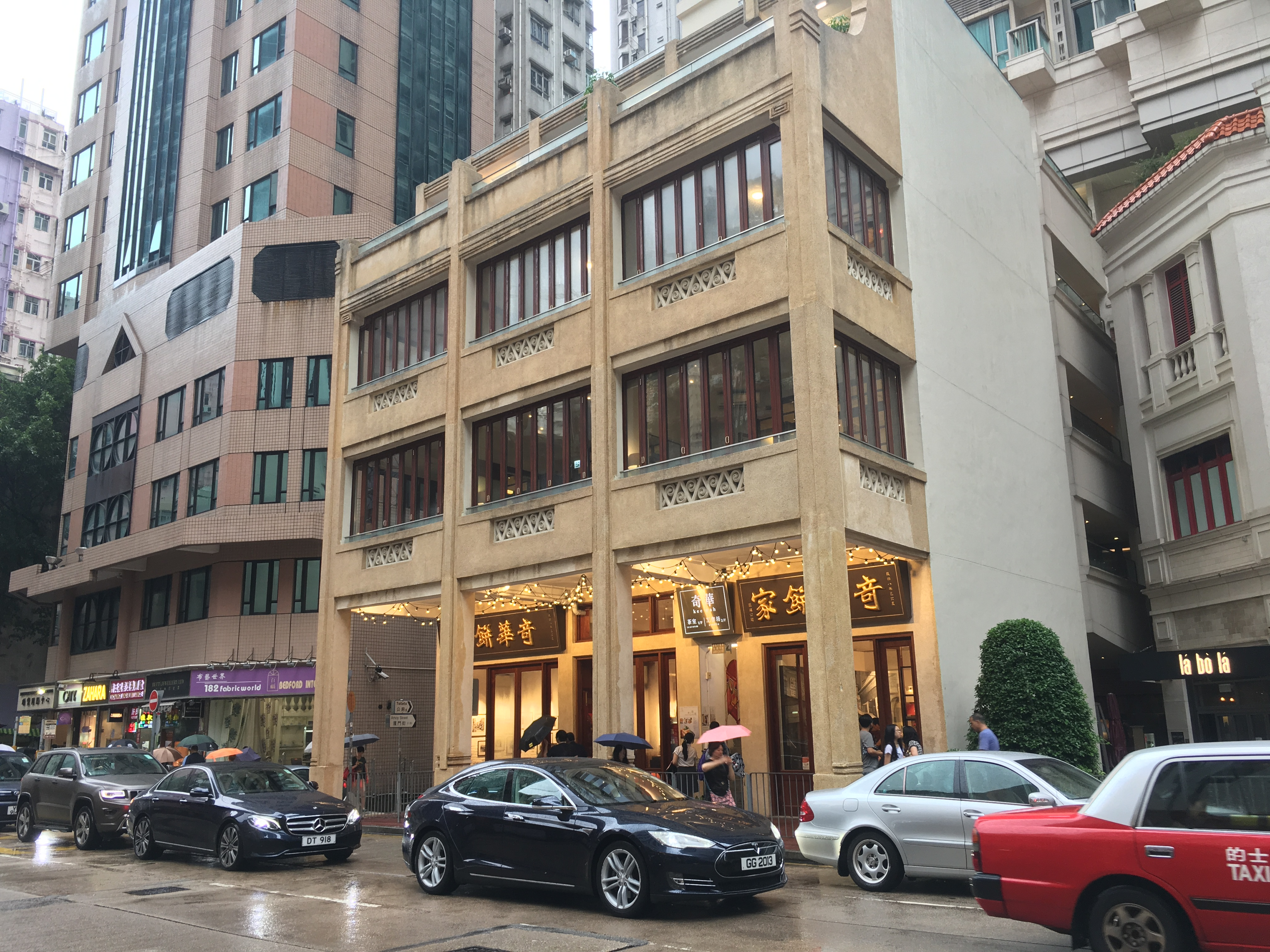
Nos. 186–190 Queen's Road East.

The three tenement buildings are historic Chinese shophouses in Wanchai built in the 1930s. They are Grade III historic buildings. They are Tong lau buildings in a unique Guangzhou style, with narrow frontage, four storeys high, with verandahs facing Queen's Road East. The ground floors were shops, and families lived above.

=== Lee Tung Street ===
Lee Tung Street (Chinese: 利東街), known as the Wedding Card Street (喜帖街; 囍帖街) by locals, is a street in Wan Chai. The street was famed in Hong Kong and abroad as a centre for publishing and for the manufacturing of wedding cards and other similar items. As part of an Urban Renewal Authority (URA) project, all interests of Lee Tung Street were resumed by and reverted to the Government of Hong Kong since 1 November 2005, and subsequently demolished in December 2007. The site was redeveloped as a luxury shopping and housing development.

=== QRE Plaza ===
Hopewell Centre or QRE Plaza is a 25-storey building located at No. 202 Queen's Road East, developed by Hopewell Holdings. The plaza was completed in 2007 and contains a shopping centre, restaurants and health clinics. QRE Plaza measures nearly 89 metres (292 ft) in height. The building has a Gross floor area (GFA) of about 77,000 square feet (7,200 m^{2}).

=== Spring Garden Lane ===
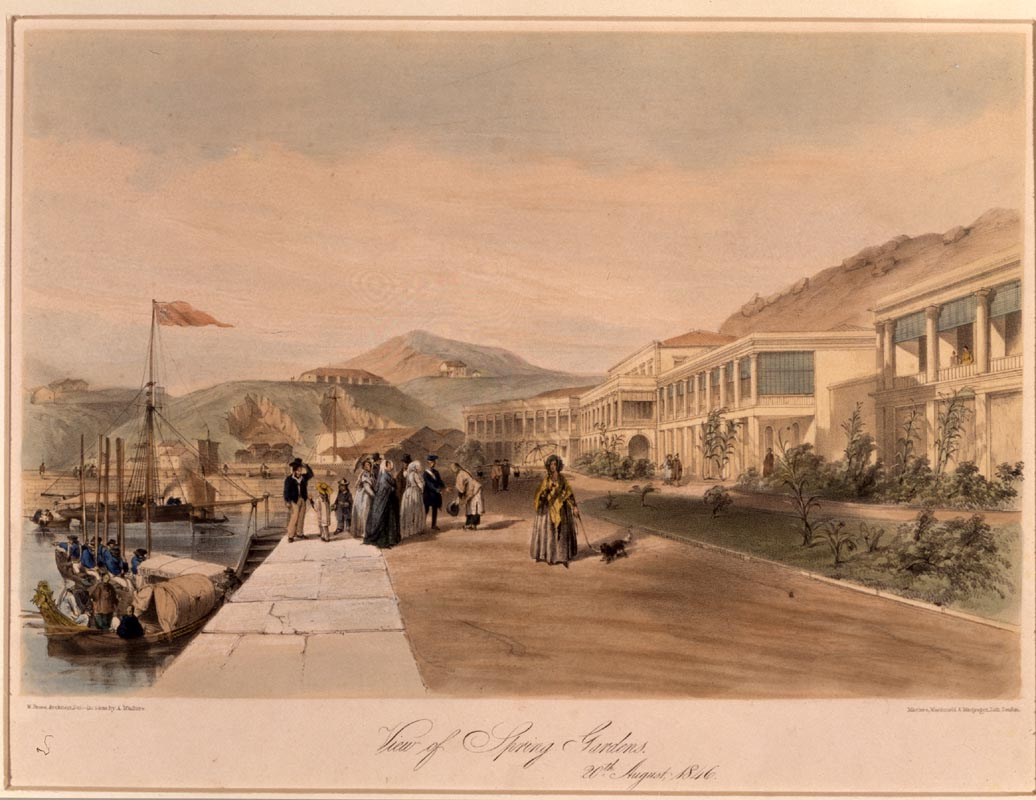
Spring Gardens, 1846

Spring Garden Lane runs south, then southwest from Johnston Road to Queen's Road East. During the early development of Wan Chai, one of the focal area of development was Spring Gardens. The name was used by the British during the early colonial Hong Kong era in the 1840s. The word "spring" in "Spring Gardens" was supposed to be referring to a water spring. However, when the name "Spring Garden Lane" was translated into Chinese, the resulting name became "春園街", with the character "春" meaning spring season.

In the early 1900s, Spring Garden Lane and Sam Pan Street (三板街) became a red-light district with western and eastern prostitutes. To attract attention, brothels were displaying large street number plates, and the area became known as "Big Number Brothels".

=== GARDENEast ===
GARDENEast (No. 222) is a 28-storeys serviced apartments building.

=== McGregor Street ===
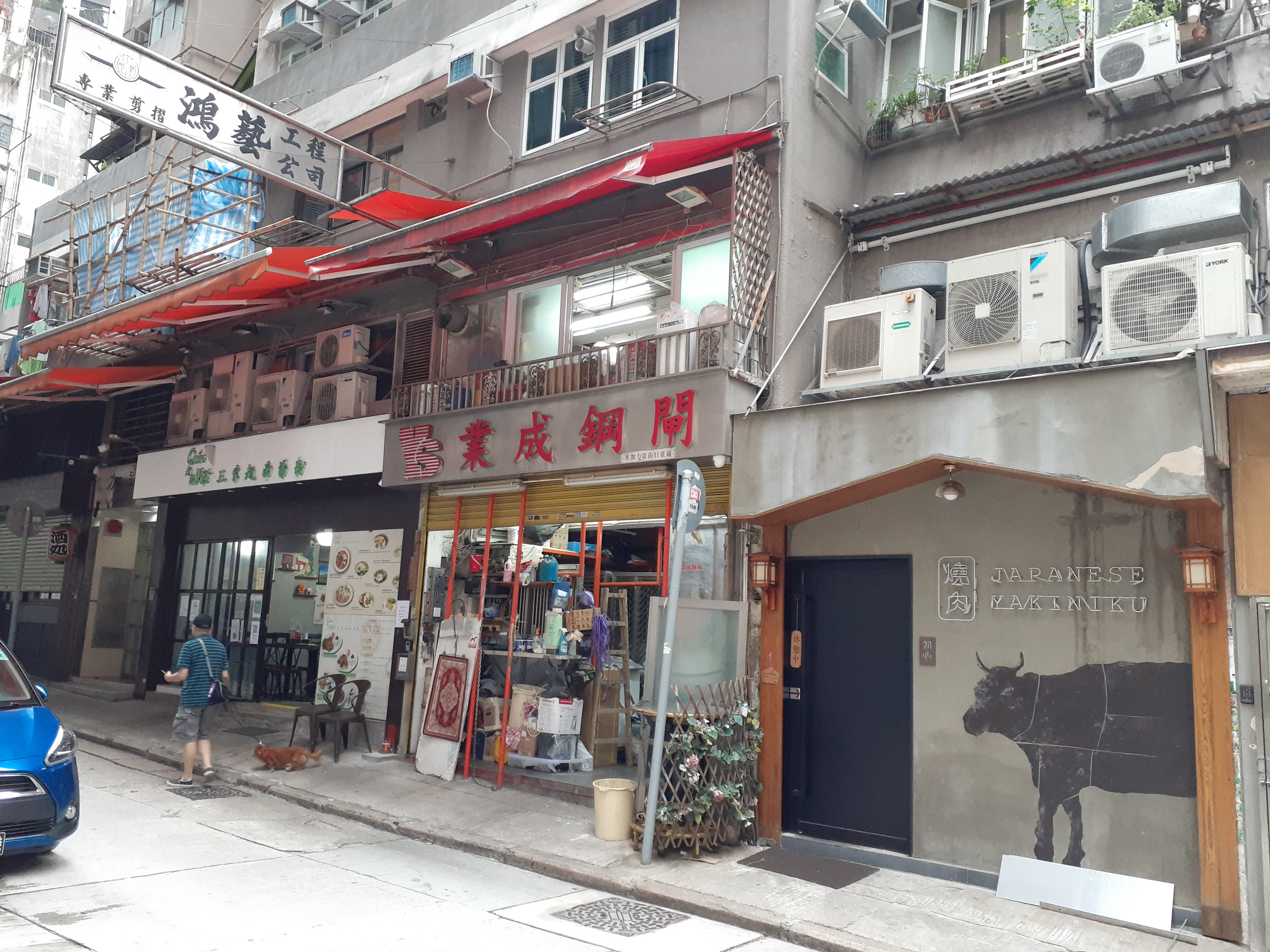
McGregor Street

McGregor Street (麥加力歌街) is a short street that runs north from Queen's Road East, then turns east to join Tai Yuen Street. McGregor Street is named for the warehouses owned by the hong McGregor & Co., which built the first timber pier in Hong Kong, in place of earlier bamboo piers.

=== Tai Yuen Street ===
Tai Yuen Street (太原街) runs north from Queen's Road East to Johnston Road. It is joined from the west by McGregor Street, whereupon it becomes a one-way street which is closed to traffic between the hours of 10 a.m. and 6 p.m. to host a thriving outdoor market. It then (very aptly) crosses Cross Street before terminating at Johnston Road.

Tai Yuen Street is named after the capital of Shanxi province, Taiyuan. The street was originally called Albany Street, but was renamed in 1909 to prevent confusion with a street located south of Government House in Central which shared the same name.

Tai Yuen Street is known locally as "Toy Street" because of the many toy shops which line the street. The Open Market in Tai Yuen Street and Cross Street form part of the Wan Chai Heritage Trail.

=== Hotel Indigo ===
The Hotel Indigo (No. 246) is a boutique hotel, part of the InterContinental Hotel Group. It has 138 rooms. There is a restaurant on the second floor and a Skybar on the 29th floor, beside a glass-bottomed swimming pool.

=== Dah Sing Financial Centre ===
Dah Sing Financial Centre (formerly called Sunlight Tower, MLC Tower or CEF Life Tower ) is a 40-storey skyscraper located at 248 Queen's Road East. It is 156 metres (512 ft) tall and has 40 floors. Designed by Andrew Lee King Fun & Associates, it was completed in 1998.

=== Wan Chai Road ===
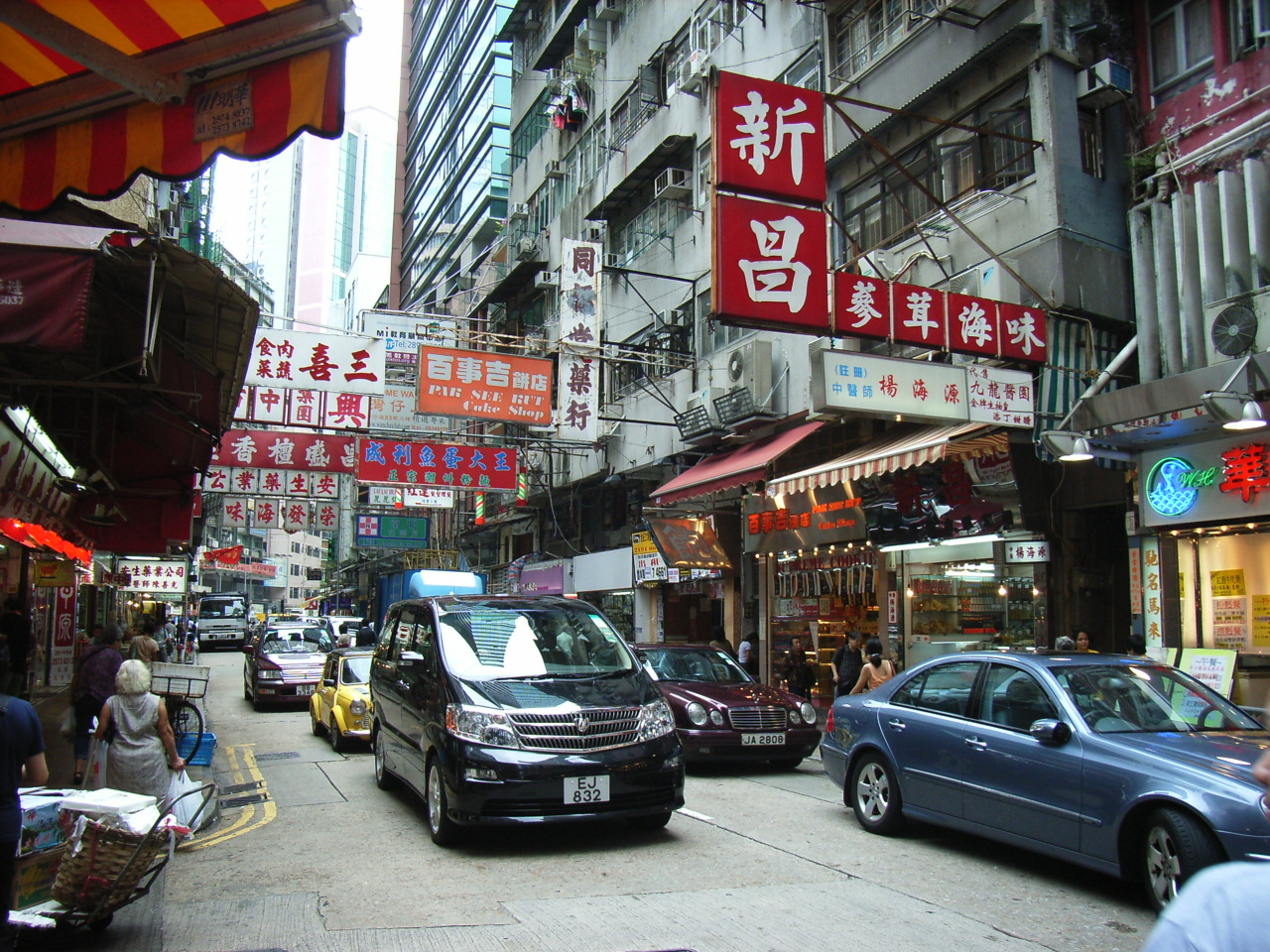
Wan Chai Road in August 2006.

Wan Chai Road runs southwest from Johnston Road, then south to Queen's Road East, which it joins to the east of Wanchai Market and west of One Wanchai and the Royal Hong Kong Jockey Club Garden. It was constructed in 1851 along Morrison Hill from the foot of Hospital Hill (now near the old Wan Chai Market building) to the beach at Observation Point (now near Tin Lok Lane).

In the 1930 and 1940s, Hong Kong funeral services used to gather in Wan Chai Road and Tin Lok Lane as the area is closed to the cemeteries in Happy Valley. The first funeral parlour in Hong Kong, named Hong Kong Funeral Home, was founded on 216 Wan Chai Road in the early 1930s, opposite a cemetery carving workshop. The coffin showroom was on Tin Lok Lane. On 5 September 1966, Hong Kong Funeral Home moved to Quarry Bay, however, the old parlour of Wan Chai Road still in service until its dismantling in 1967.

=== Old Wan Chai Market ===
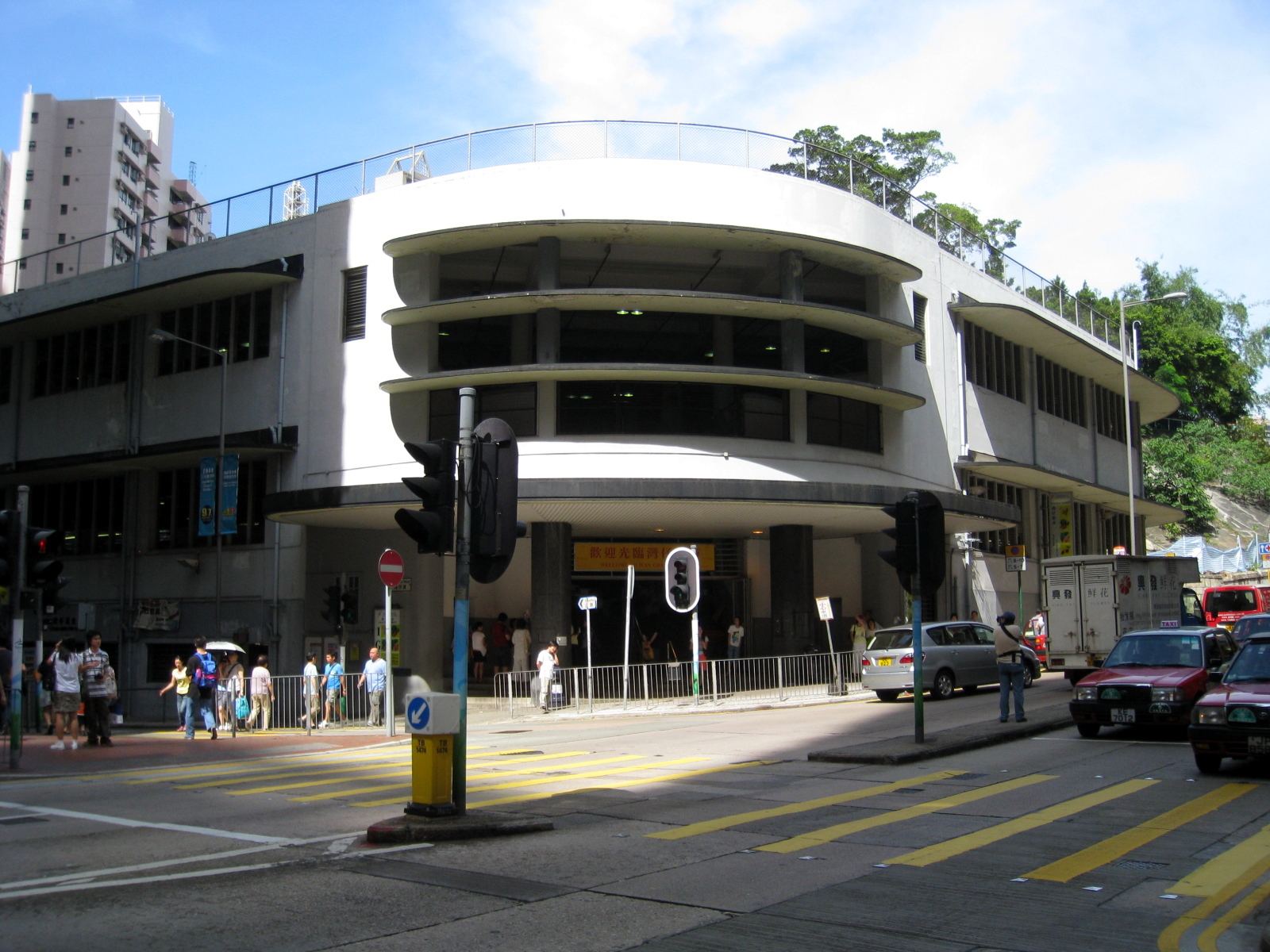
Old Wan Chai Market. No. 264.

(No. 264). Grade III historic building.

=== Hong Kong Jockey Club Garden ===
香港賽馬會花園

=== Ruttonjee Hospital ===
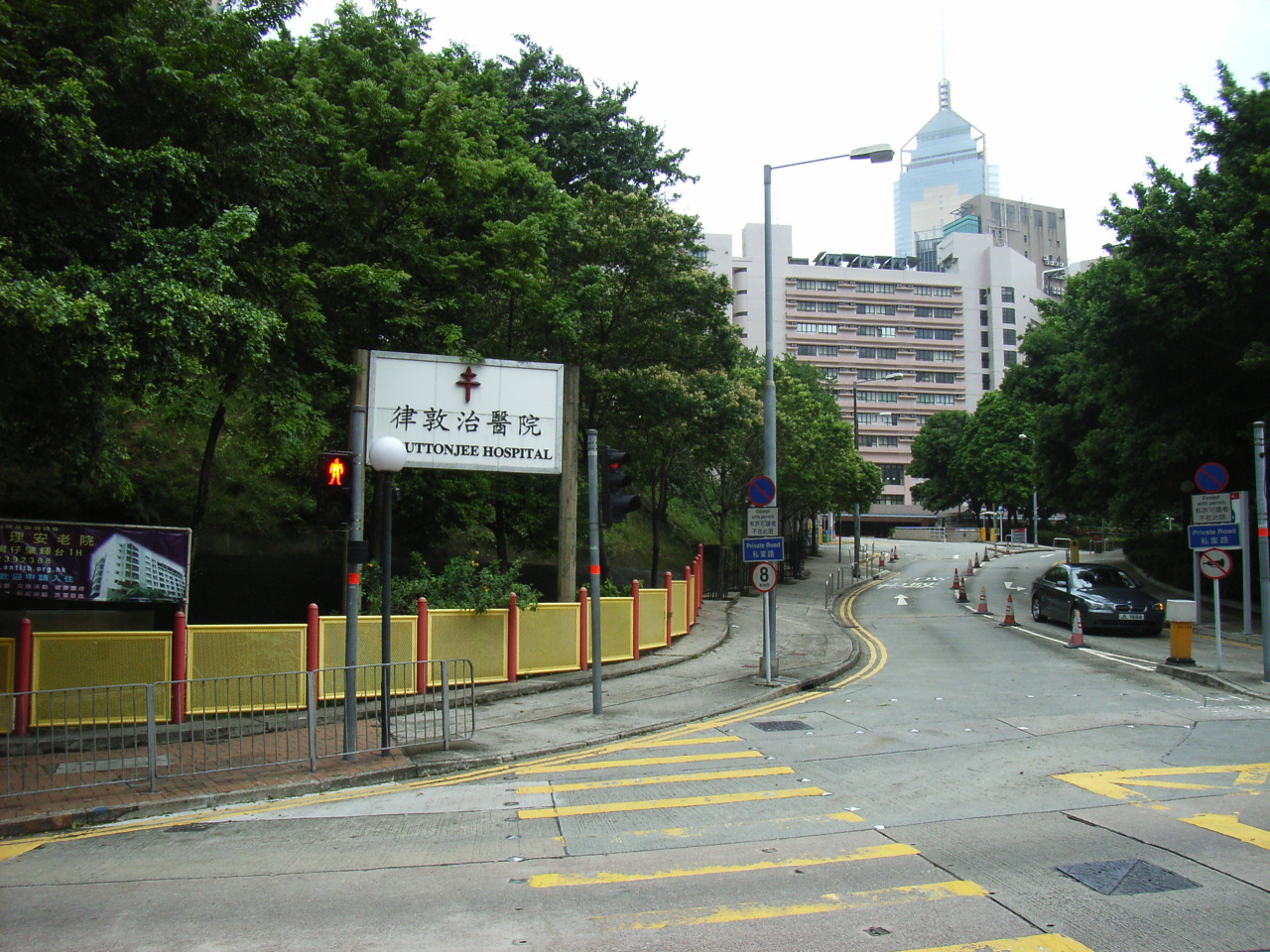
Entrance of Ruttonjee Hospital, viewed from Queen's Road East.

Ruttonjee Hospital (no. 266) was merged with Tang Shiu Kin Hospital in 1998. The Hong Kong Tuberculosis, Chest and Heart Disease Association building is a Grade III historic building.

=== Wan Chai Park ===
Wan Chai Park (灣仔公園)

=== Wood Road ===
lLocated further east, past Wan Chai Park, and connects Queen's Road East to Wan Chai Road

=== Queen Elizabeth Stadium ===
Queen Elizabeth Stadium is opposite Cosmopolitan Hotel

=== Wong Nai Chung Road ===
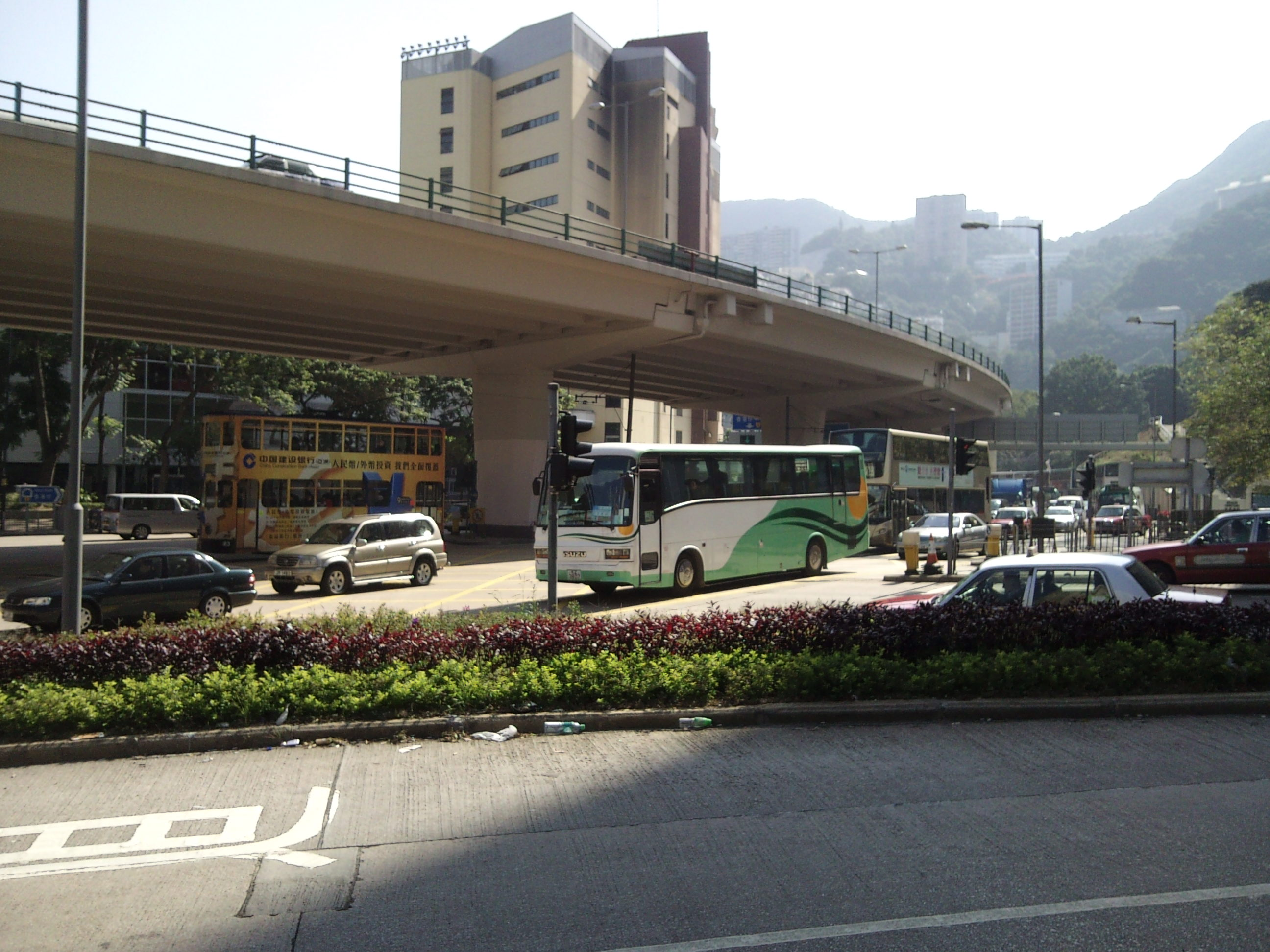
Wong Nai Chung Road near Queen's Road East

Queen's Road East widens at its eastern end, then runs under the Wong Nai Chung Gap Flyover to terminate on Wong Nai Chung Road coming from the south where that road becomes the Morrison Hill Road continuing north.

== South side features ==
The following list follows a west-east order along the south side of the street, including intersecting streets, buildings and other features. The only street crossing with Queen's Road East, i.e. having both north and south junctions with the Road, is Ship Street.

Type	Feature	Notes	Image
Junction	Justice Drive (正義道)		
Junction	Monmouth Path 萬茂里		
Building	Three Pacific Place	(No. 1) A 34-storey office building connected by an underground walkway and travelator to the Admiralty MTR interchange and the Mall at Pacific Place.	Queen's Road East entrance of Three Pacific Place.
Junction	Wing Fung Street	Part of the Starstreet Precinct shopping and dining area	
Junction	Wing Lok Lane 永樂里	Short street connecting Queen's Road East to Sun Street	
Junction	St. Francis Street		
Building	Hung Shing Temple	(Nos. 129–131). Grade I historic building.	Hung Shing Temple. Nos. 129–131.
Intersection	Ship Street		
Building	Hopewell Centre	(No. 183)	Looking west, next to the entrance of Hopewell Centre (left)
Building	Wu Chung House	(No. 213)	
Building	Old Wan Chai Post Office	(No. 221). A declared monument	Old Wan Chai Post Office. No. 221.
Junction	Wan Chai Gap Road 灣仔峽道		
Building	Queen's Cube	(No. 239) 29-storey apartment building. Completed in 2010.	
Junction	Stone Nullah Lane		
Junction	Kennedy Street 堅彌地街		
Junction	Kennedy Road		
Building	Wah Yan College	(No. 281). Located on Mount Parish.	View of Wan Chai Park and Wah Yan College, separated by Queen's Road East.
Portal		Portals No. 79, 80 and 81 of the former air raid precaution (ARP) tunnels, which were built under Mount Parish some time before the Battle of Hong Kong in 1941.	
Junction	Stubbs Road		
Building	Khalsa Diwan Sikh Temple	(No. 371). Grade II historic building.	Khalsa Diwan Sikh Temple in 2007. No. 371.
Building	Dorsett Wanchai Hong Kong Hotel	Formerly Cosmopolitan Hotel. (Nos. 387–397). Located at the eastern end of the street. The building was formerly the location of the Hong Kong Branch of the Xinhua News Agency.	Cosmopolitan Hotel
Intersection	Wong Nai Chung Road	Opposite the northwestern part of Happy Valley Racecourse, and junction with Morrison Hill Road	

== In popular culture ==
The 1991 song, also titled "Queen's Road East" (皇后大道東), by Taiwanese singer Lo Ta-yu and Hong Kong singer-composer Ram Chiang makes references to the handover of Hong Kong to China.

== Sources ==
- Three Pacific Place, Swire Properties
