= Praya =

Promenade by the waterfront in Hong Kong

- Chinese: 海旁
Transcriptions
Standard Mandarin
- Hanyu Pinyin: Hǎibàng
Yue: Cantonese
- Jyutping: hoi2 pong4

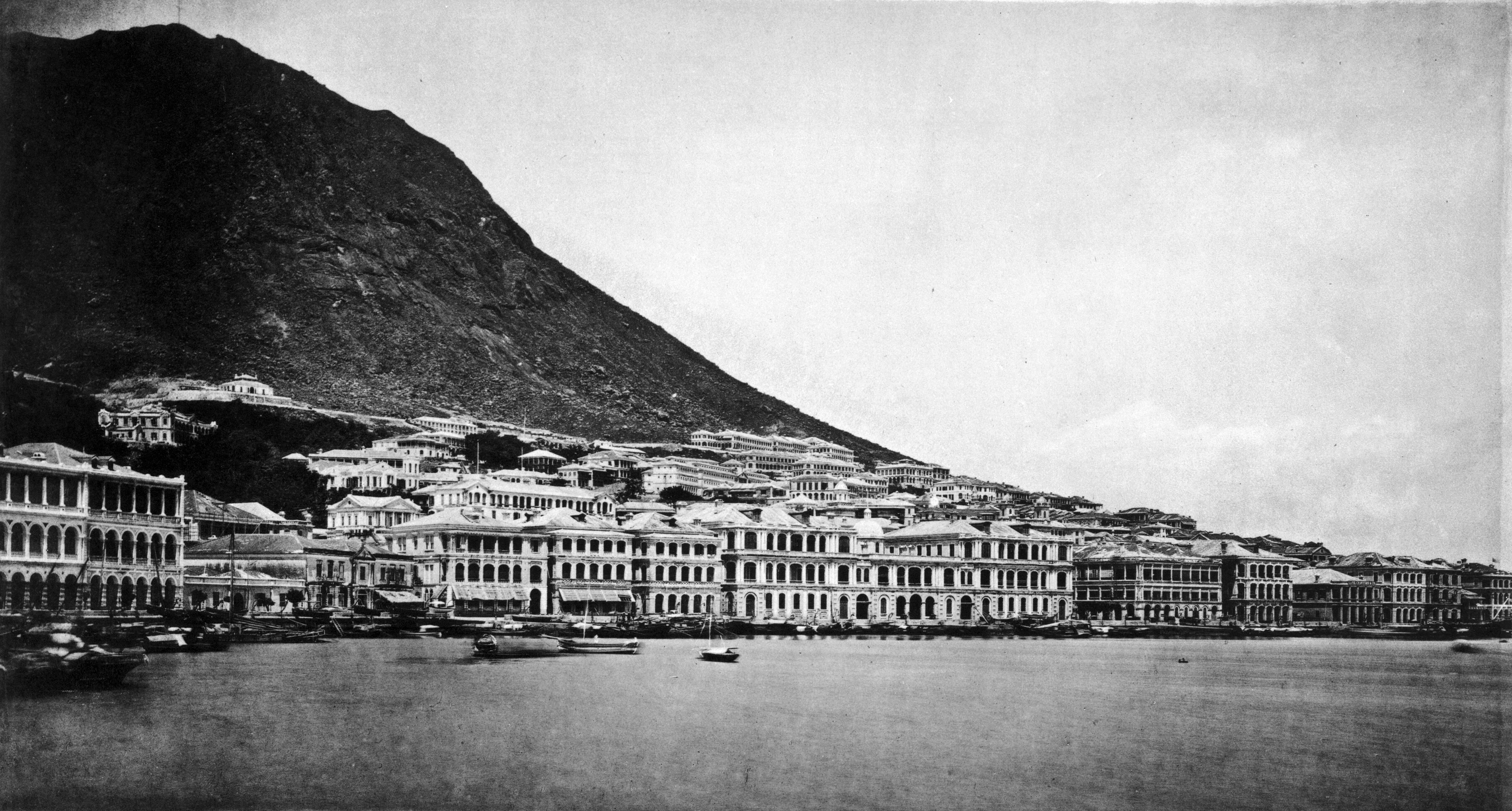
Praya Central, around 1873

Praya (Chinese: 海旁; lit. 'next to the sea') was a term used in 19th-century Hong Kong to refer to a promenade by the waterfront. The name comes from the Portuguese word praia, which means "beach," but in China it came to mean a stone-faced waterfront road. In Hong Kong, it was a broad road running parallel along the harbour in front of the city. HSBC and Dent & Co. were just some of the major companies based in the area.

== History ==
British occupation of Hong Kong Island began on 26 January 1841, and the colonial government held its first land sale on 14 June of that year. Purchasers were mostly the British, Indian and Parsee traders such as Dent, Jardines and Lindsay. These traders were mainly import and export merchants and required land with frontage along Victoria Harbour.

Queen's Road, to the south, was the first road opened. The land lots acquired were subsequently much expanded and reclaimed from the sea without paying rent to the government. The first land reclamations after 1841 were private ones without any planning at all, making the shoreline very irregular.

Lisa Lim of the South China Morning Post argued that the proximity of Macau meant that Hong Kongers kept using the word "praya" as opposed to the word "bund".

A number of reclamation schemes took place around the time that John Bowring served as the Hong Kong governor. Hence many of the major Praya areas were named after him. The long names are usually "Bowring Praya East", "Bowring Praya Central" for example.

== Major areas ==
=== Praya West ===
The Praya Reclamation Scheme began in 1868 in this area. It was completed in 1873, adding significant land to Praya West and Central. Praya west is now Des Voeux Road West.

=== Praya Central ===
Praya central is now Des Voeux Road Central.

=== Praya East ===
The Praya East area went through a series of land reclamation projects. The earliest series was known as Praya East Reclamation Scheme. The filled in area is known as today's Johnston Road and Hennessy Road in Wan Chai. The Hong Kong Tramways first opened its service in 1904 in Praya East.

== Roads and areas ==
There are at least seven waterfront roads in Hong Kong that still retain the name praya:

- Aberdeen Praya Road (香港仔海旁道)
- Cheung Chau Praya Street (長洲海傍街) - roadway that lines the southwest part of the island; the street is lined with buildings for most of the route facing the island's inner harbour
- Kennedy Town Praya (堅彌地城海旁) - a short roadway from about Collinson Street westwards to Sand Street in Kennedy Town. The eastern end of the street becomes Des Voeux Road West, itself formerly called Praya West. Reclamation projects have made the roadway landlocked.
- New Praya, Kennedy Town (堅彌地城新海旁) - located north of the Kennedy Town Praya and runs from Sands Street to west of Cadogan Street. Unlike Kennedy Town Praya, this praya is still a waterfront roadway
- Ap Lei Chau Praya Road (鴨脷洲海旁道)
- Lei Yue Mun Praya Road (鯉魚門海傍道)
- Tin Wan Praya Road (田灣海旁道) - Tin Wan Praya Road is located in the Southern District of Hong Kong Island. It starts from the roundabout at the junction of Tin Wan Hill Road and Fish Market Road in the east, and ends at the roundabout of Wah Kwai Village Bus Terminal in the west.

== See also ==
- Victoria, Hong Kong
- Praia
- The Bund
