= Amoy (disambiguation) =

Xiamen, or Amoy, is a city on the southeast coast of China.

Amoy may also refer to:

- Amoy dialect, a dialect of Hokkien Chinese, which is part of the Southern Min group of Chinese dialects
- Amoy Food, a manufacturer of sauces, condiments and processed foods
- Amoy Properties, now Hang Lung Properties, a property developer in Hong Kong
- Amoy Street (Hong Kong), a street in Wan Chai, Hong Kong

== People ==
- Amoy Brown (born 1996), Jamaican footballer

== See also ==
- Amoy Street (disambiguation)
- Åmøy, an island in Norway
- Xiamen (disambiguation)
