= Spring Garden Lane =

Street in Wan Chai, Hong Kong

Coordinates: 22.275425°N 114.172710°E

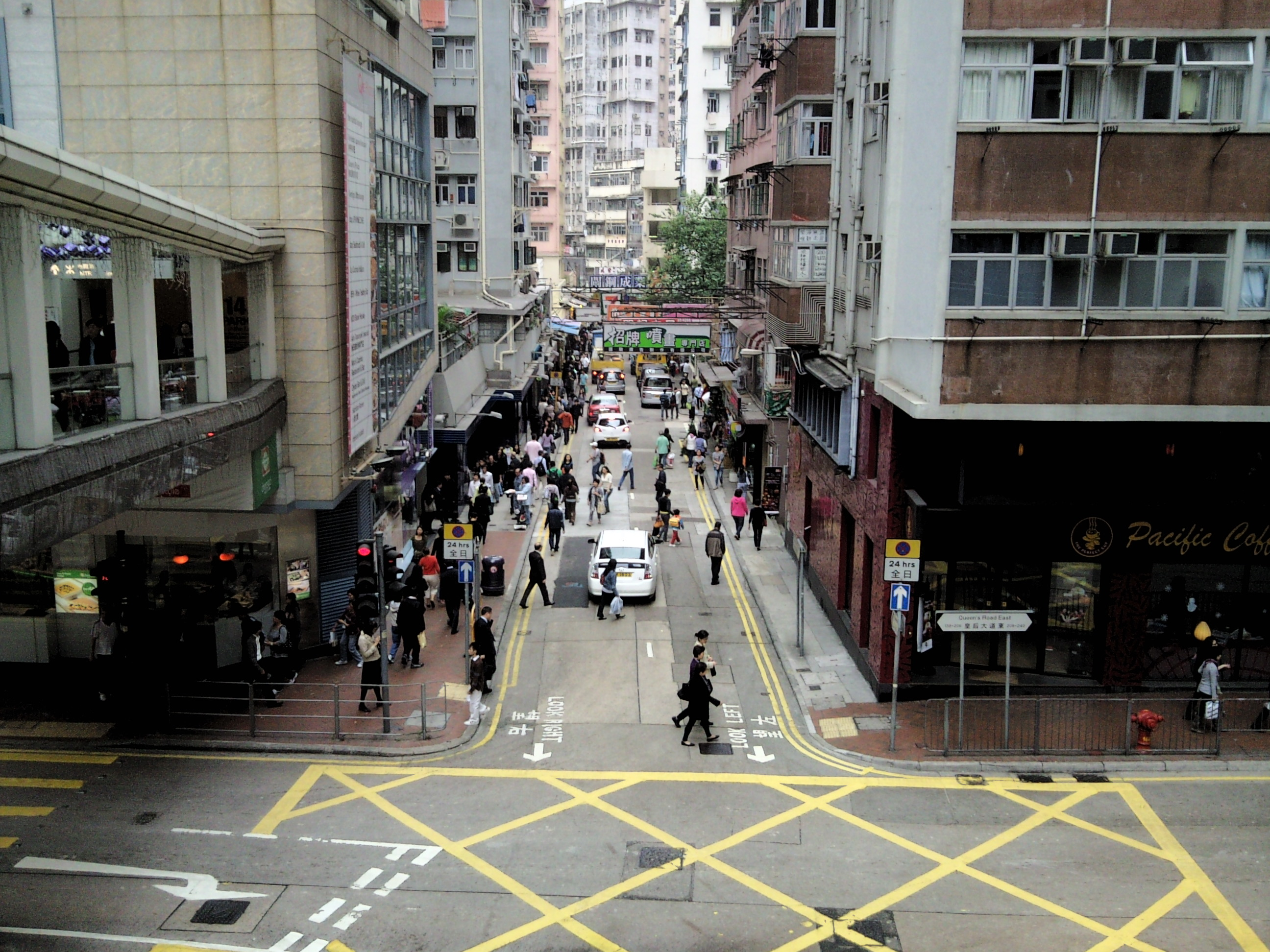
- Southern end of Spring Garden Lane, viewed from Queen's Road East
- Interactive map of Spring Garden Lane
- Native name: 春園街 (Yue Chinese)
- Length: 0.36 km (0.22 mi)
- Location: Wan Chai
- South end: Kennedy Road
- Major junctions: Queen's Road East
- North end: Johnston Road

Construction
- Completed: 1840s

Spring Garden Lane
- Traditional Chinese: 春園街
- Simplified Chinese: 春园街
- Jyutping: Ceon1 jyun4 gaai1
Transcriptions
Standard Mandarin
- Hanyu Pinyin: Chūn Yuán Jiē
Yue: Cantonese
- Yale Romanization: Chēun yùhn gāai
- Jyutping: Ceon1 jyun4 gaai1

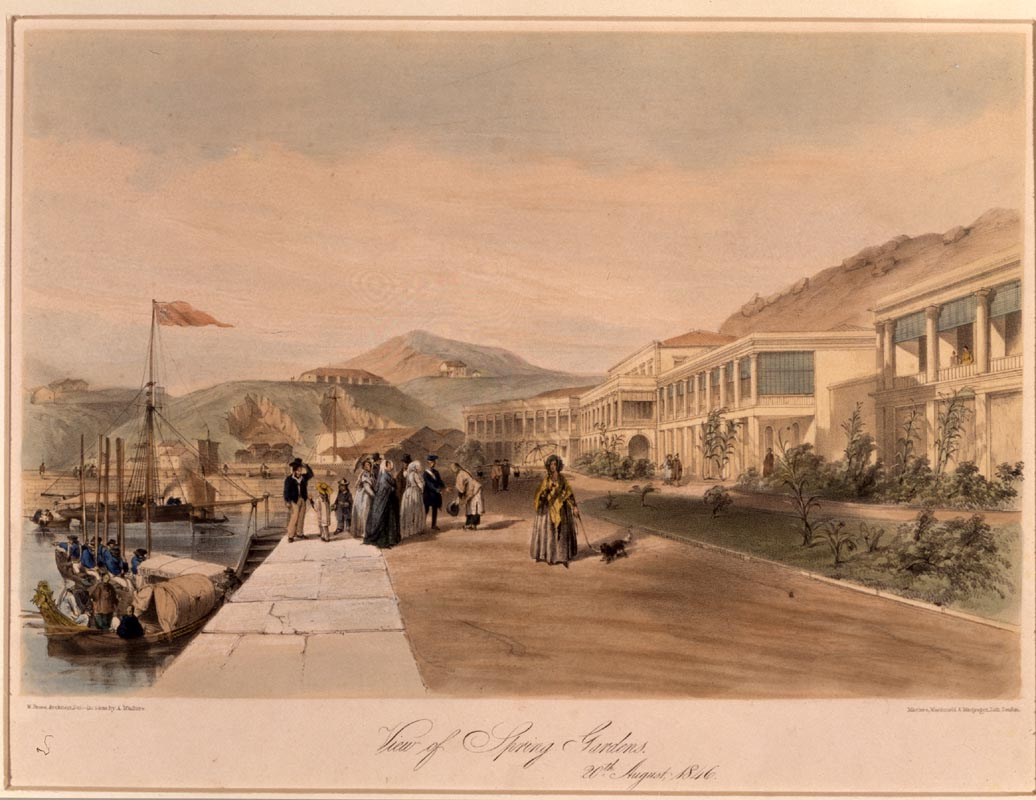
Spring Gardens, 20 August 1846.

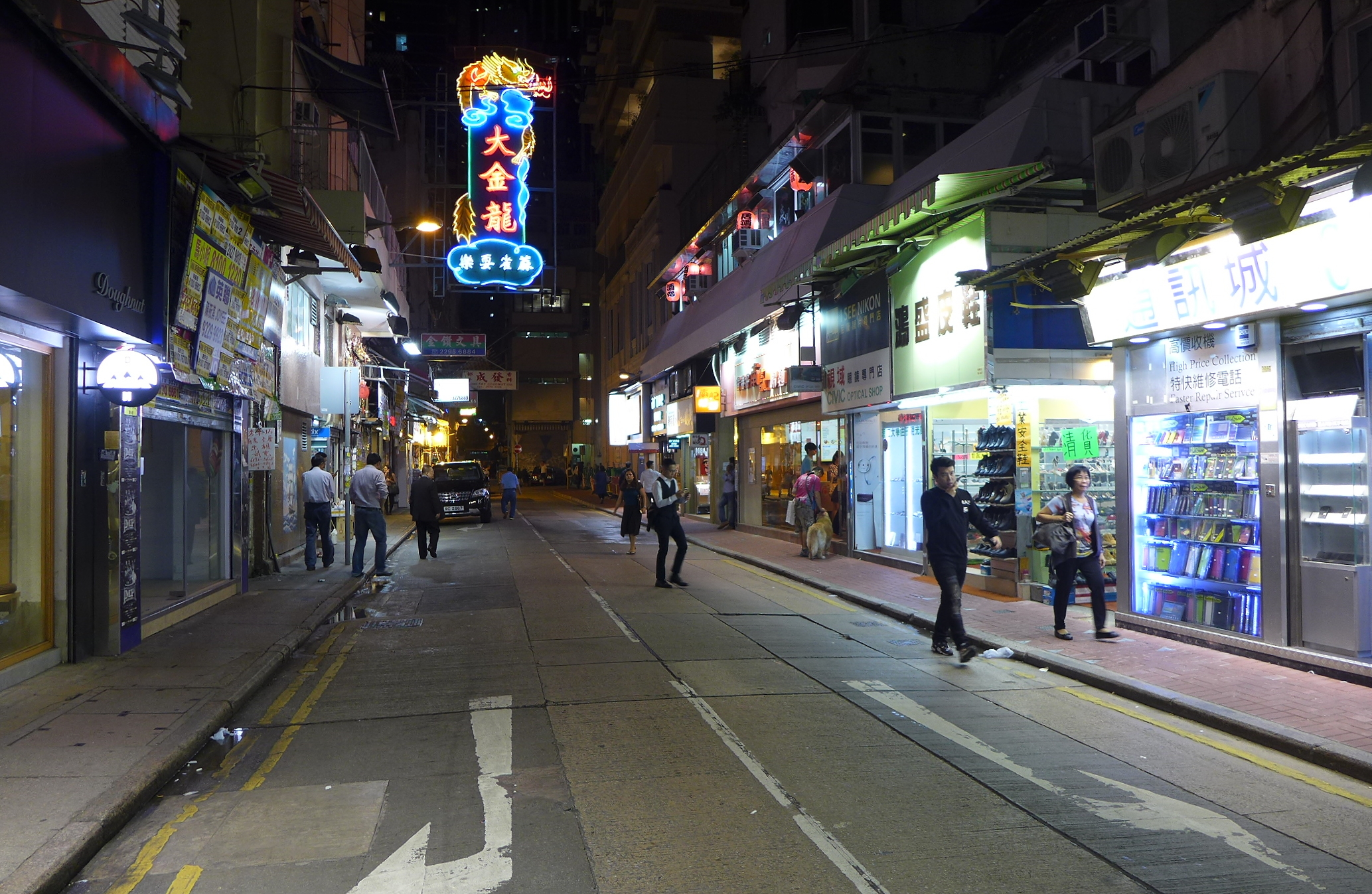
Northern end of Spring Garden Lane, viewed from Johnston Road.

Spring Garden Lane (Chinese: 春園街; Jyutping: ceon1 jyun4 gaai1) is a street in Wan Chai, Hong Kong, connecting Queen's Road East to its south, and Johnston Road to the north. It was one of the first focal areas developed by the British in Hong Kong during the 1840s.

== History ==
During the early development of Wan Chai, one of the focal area of development was Spring Gardens. The name was used by the British during the early colonial Hong Kong era in the 1840s. The word "spring" in "Spring Gardens" was supposed to be referring to a water spring. However, when the name "Spring Garden Lane" was translated into Chinese, the resulting name became "春園街", with the character "春" meaning spring season. The water spring mentioned possibly refers to the mountain creek beside Hopewell Centre in Queen's Road East.

In the early 1900s, Spring Garden Lane and Sam Pan Street (三板街) became a red-light district with western and eastern prostitutes. To attract attention, brothels were displaying large street number plates, and the area became known as "Big Number Brothels".

During the founding of the People's Republic of China around 1948 to 1949, many of the Communist party guerrilla forces found their way to Hong Kong after World War II. One of them was the East River Guerrilla Force (東江縱隊), which formed a pro-Communist underground group called the Hailiushe (海流社). They were headquartered in the rooftop of a multi-story house on Spring Garden Lane. The area and group was raided by the Hong Kong police, while it was an operating network cell.

Around Spring Garden Lane are Lee Tung Street, Swatow Street and Amoy Street where warehouses abounded, storing cargoes to be shipped to Chinese coastline cities.

== Intersections ==
The entire street is in Wan Chai, Wan Chai District.

km	mi	Destinations	Notes
0.00	0.00	Kennedy Road	Pedestrianized
0.10	0.062	Cul-de-sac	Southern terminus for traffic
0.15	0.093	Queen's Road East	
0.25	0.16	Cross Street	Closed to traffic
0.36	0.22	Johnston Road	Northern terminus
1.000 mi = 1.609 km; 1.000 km = 0.621 mi: Closed/former
