= Zi Teng =

Sex workers' non-governmental support organisation

- Formation: 1996
- Type: NGO
- Purpose: support of sex workers
- Headquarters: Hong Kong
- Region served: Hong Kong
- Founder: Yim Yue Lin
- Website: ziteng.org.hk

Zi Teng (Chinese: 紫藤; pinyin: zǐténg) is a non-governmental organisation that cares about the basic rights of women who live in Hong Kong and those who came from mainland China, especially sex workers. Zi Teng's membership includes social workers, womens' studies researchers, church workers, and labour activists, among others.

Zi Teng provides assistance to sex workers from Hong Kong and China in the form of legal advice and health care. Aiming to build up mutual support through networking, Zi Teng operates a 24-hour paging system in case of emergencies.

According to the organisation's website, the name "Zi Teng" is the Chinese for Acorus calamus. "The plant is described as extraordinarily tough and strong, often growing unnoticeably alongside other wild grasses." The organisation uses "Zi Teng" to symbolise the character of tough but low-profile working women. Other sources, however, translate Zi Teng as Wisteria sinensis., while Acorus calamus is in Chinese: 菖蒲; pinyin: chāngpú.

== Background ==
Sex workers, known also as prostitutes, are people who earn a living by providing sexual services. Prostitution is one of the longest surviving professions in the world. Attitudes surrounding prostitution have evolved over time from a celebrated necessity to a cultural evil.

Although prostitution in Hong Kong is legal, sex workers in Hong Kong are often marginalised, discriminated against, and denied by the society, which leads to their deprivation of many basic human rights. Such actions could impede themselves from seeking legal protection and redress when violated (e.g. non-payment, rape, violence). In addition, there is always the risk of contracting sexually transmitted diseases in this profession.

Despite sex work's legal status, several Hong Kong laws restrict sex workers. For example, the notable law on "soliciting for immoral purposes" (CAP 200, no 147) indirectly bans street bargaining and puts sex workers in a very vulnerable position.

=== Sex workers in Hong Kong ===
This part together with the "Problems Faced by Sex Workers in Hong Kong" come mainly from the article "Problems Faced by Sex Workers in Hong Kong", with some amendments.

Sex workers found in Hong Kong consists of locals and a sizeable percentage from mainland China, Thailand, the Philippines, and other Asian countries. They may work as lounge hostesses, bar waitresses, masseuses, social escorts, or providing services in 'salons', saunas, or rented rooms. Among them, the "yeit lao yeit fong" (or "yeit lao yeit","161""141", means "one apartment one woman") is most common. The fees charged may vary from the services rendered. According to the Hong Kong law (cap 200, section 117), any premises, vessel or place used wholly or mainly by two or more persons for the purposes of prostitution is treated as a vice establishment, and anyone who runs, hires or rents such places could be prosecuted. To escape the restrict of this law, the only-one-prostitute apartment "yeit lao yeit fong" model was developed. The famous Hong Kong film Golden Chicken (金鸡) is a story about such a woman.

Currently, there are about 20,000 sex workers in Hong Kong operating in active sex trade areas like Mong Kok, Tsim Sha Tsui, Wan Chai, Tsuen Wan, and Shum Shui Po. In Mong Kok alone, there are approximately 500 brothels, motels and massage parlours, over 1,000 workers in the sex service industry, and between 10,000 and 20,000 'clients' a day.

A large number of the sex workers in Hong Kong arrive as tourists from mainland China, Thailand, the Philippines and other Asian countries. The majority being illiterate or semi-literate, they have poor knowledge with regards to safe sex practices and sexually transmitted diseases. Compelled to earn as much as possible within such a short period of time, sex workers may accept up to 30 clients a day to pay for the journey.

=== Problems faced by sex workers in Hong Kong ===
- Social discrimination
- Ambiguity of legal rights

Though sex work is legal in Hong Kong, there are several laws that restrict sex work (see Related Laws below), leaving sex workers in a very vulnerable position from a legal standpoint. Such ambiguities on top of a general ignorance of legal aids often lead to inappropriate actions, such as the act of pleading guilty in hope of more lenient sentence when caught by police. These actions may constitute a HK$10,000 penalty (double for migrants) and up to 6 months' imprisonment.

- Vulnerability to violence and police harassment

Sex workers are often subjected to violence and abuse by clients, pimps, mafia, drug-dealers and law enforcers. Be it rape, robbery, abuse or threats, sex workers often dare not, and have no chance to identify the criminals due to the social bias.

Recently, there has been an increase in the robbery of "yeit lao yeit fong", (一樓一鳳) sometimes resulting in rape, violence or even murder. Women sex workers have started installing security cameras to capture pictures of these violators, and using them as evidence to help police prosecute some of these robbers. However, most sex workers cannot afford the expensive equipment.

On 10 November 2006, police conducted over 500 raids on prostitution venues in Mong Kok, arresting over 2,800 people and seizing signboards which sex workers use to advertise their services. Vice establishments has fallen by 50% in the area compared to records in 2001.

- Occupational health

Sex workers often cannot refuse their customers even if they do not use a condom. While this is tantamount to rape, since the sex worker had only consented to sex with condoms, and not without, there is no law in this area to protect sex workers.

The lack of knowledge about contraception and safe sex also adds to the problem, especially for migrant workers from the mainland China. Their risk of infection is extremely high, since condom supplies are seldom available and their bargaining power is low.

- Migrant women sex workers

Sex workers from the Mainland

The number of mainland sex workers working in Hong Kong is difficult to estimate because the women come and go frequently, staying between two weeks to three months on two-way permits. An increasing number are on individual visit permits, which was introduced in July 2003, they usually stay for a week. It is illegal for mainland visitors (including sex workers) to work in Hong Kong. If caught, they are charged with breaching the conditions of stay, an act liable to a maximum penalty of two years' imprisonment and a fine of HK$50,000 (most are jailed for three months and then deported).

See Related Laws below

- Pressure and mental disorder

Normally, people regard prostitution as an abnormal career and will show no respect towards this career. However, due to their low educational level and some personal reasons, it is difficult for sex workers to change to other job fields or stop working as sex workers. Because of all these, they may suffer from short-term emotional instability. If they are not able to find ways out, some of them may even suffer from depression. The above-mentioned problem that faced by the sex workers really urge for help and concern for the general public.

Conclusion

The abovementioned points strongly suggests the need for sex workers' activism.

Several local organisations in recent years have begun providing health and legal information and referral services to sex workers. Notably, Zi Teng has been advocating better social rights and legal status for sex workers' and challenging the public discrimination of sex work. e.g. a recent public demonstration against the International Red Cross's discrimination against sex workers and sexual minorities from donating blood.

Over the years, public education and empowerment of sex workers have created discernible changes – public becoming more aware of sex workers' issues, gradual decrease in police harassment and prosecution, sex workers asserting needs for themselves. Yet the abovementioned problems and other issues such as the legalisation of sex work and taxation on sex work income, remain unresolved, hence the need for activism. Society's deep-rooted bias towards sex work also calls for transformation of collective consciousness.

== History ==
The founder of this organisation is Yim Yue Lin (嚴月蓮). Yim started to be aware of labour rights when she encountered an industrial dispute in her working factory. Afterwards, Yim has been working in different organisations fighting for the benefits of working labour. In 1994, Yim met her first-hand experience with the sex workers when she was working in the Hong Kong Women Christian Council (香港婦女基督徒協會). The inequalities, deprivations and discriminations that sex workers have to confront with, have strengthened Yim's determination to help this minority group of people. It was later joined by other staff members, such as Elaine Lam, Mok Miu-ying, Chan Yan-yan and Kendy Yim Kit-sum. Zi Teng has also been supported by dozens of interns and volunteers.

In 1999, Zi Teng carried out Hong Kong's only study of mainland prostitutes. After in-depth interviews with mainland prostitutes in Hong Kong, the Pearl River Delta, and Macau, it found that most of the women were travelling to South Asian countries on Chinese passports and used Hong Kong as a stopover.

For the past few years, Zi Teng field workers visit the field (lock-ups or red-light districts) twice a week to spread knowledge of AIDS and health and safety measures. They also provide free condoms to sex workers.

== Purpose ==
Zi Teng believes that "all women, regardless of their profession, social classes, religion, or races, have the same basic human rights, that they are equal and entitled to fair and equal treatment in the legal and judicial system, that nobody should be oppressed against, that all people should live dignity".

With such belief they intend to help the women sex workers from Hong Kong and mainland China by means of outreach activities, publication and audio-visual production, research and social education.

Furthermore, Zi Teng advocates legal and policy changes and cultivates the space for discussion on gender, sexuality and sex work.

Although Zi Teng works with all sex workers in the field, some Zi Teng activities focus on migrant women, sex tourism, and teenage sex workers. They work mainly with local and Delta region sex workers. It is their goal that some day Zi Teng will be an organisation not just for sex workers, but led by sex workers as well.

== Radio show ==
Amazing Zi Teng – A radio show co-hosted by Zi Teng, aired monthly on the first Wednesday night on People's Radio Hong Kong. This radio show features guest speakers from the trade and discusses topics ranging from customers to the history of the Hong Kong's sex industry.

== Events ==
Stop All Violence Against Sex Workers (December 2005) – At the 6th World Trade Organization Ministerial Conference in Hong Kong, Zi Teng marched from Wanchai with different overseas sex worker organisations to demonstrate the solidarity and unity among sex workers, to urge to stop any kind of violence against sex workers. They mark the 3rd International Day to End Violence Against Sex Workers (17 December) with this protest.

Out in the Sun (May 2004) – An international forum held in Hong Kong with the aim of bringing together sex workers, trade unionists, activists, academics and legislators from countries spanning four continents. Topics such as the stigma facing sex workers, rights protection of sex workers, legislation and legal issues were shared and discussed.

First Hong Kong Sex Culture Festival (August 2006) – The sex culture festival held outside the Legislative Council building with the theme of "Harmony within diversity, saying no to prejudice and building up a harmonious diversified society". It attracted couples and families as well as rejections from the authorities.

'My Sex Life': photo exhibition of sex workers (End 2003 to beginning of 2004) – This photo exhibition was held in places such as the Hong Kong Cultural Centre and Second Floor Gallery Café. The exhibition consists of photos taken by sex workers of their working places, offering a glimpse of their life and surroundings. The photos were later published. The album and exhibition received a good response from the public.

The Ins and Outs of Sex Work and the Law (October 2006) – Jointly organised by Zi Teng and the Social Sciences Faculty of the City University of Hong Kong, this one-day seminar brings together sex workers from different countries, including Australia, Germany, New Zealand, Sweden and the United Kingdom. The aim of this seminar was to examine the legal frameworks of different countries; advocating the rights of sex workers.

First Hong Kong Sex Worker's Film Festival (11/08/06 – 13/08/06) – Hosted by Zi Teng, this 3-day film festival aimed to promote a better understanding of sex workers in Asia by showcasing films made by sex workers themselves, or in conjunction with a director.

Films

- Street Sevivor (唛相害) (2006) Taiwan, 21 mins
- Tales of The Night Fairies (2002) India, 74 mins
- Scarlot Harlot on Sex TV (2004) Canada, 8 mins
- Scarlot Harlot's Interstate Solicitation Tour (1991) US, 15 mins
- The Story of the Taipei Licensed Prostitutes (公娼啟示錄) (1998) Taiwan, 57 mins
- Straight for the Money: Interviews with Queer Sex Workers (1994) US, 59 mins
- Sex Workers' Manifesto (1997) India, 8 mins
- To See, or Not to See (假裝看不見) (2001) Taiwan, 64 mins
- Sisters And Ziteng (姐姐妹妹與紫藤) (2006) Hong Kong, 116 mins

== Funding and assistance ==
Zi Teng, being a non-governmental organisation (NGO) receives its funding (roughly HKD15,000 per month) mainly from private donations in terms of cash and cheque. One such funder is Mama Cash, a women's foundation which supports groundbreaking and innovative projects conceived by women for women all over the world.

At the same time, Zi Teng seeks helpers online for doing data collection, research, out-reaching programmes as well as publication related assistance.

== Related publications ==
A quarterly newsletter in Chinese is distributed to members, women groups and other local NGOs. Apart from publicising information on sex workers, the newsletter also generates or inspires some discussions or debates on the issues within the community. More importantly, it offers a sympathetic channel of expression for sex workers. Other publications include books, reports, T-shirts, and free downloads.

=== Books ===
- Sex is Bread and Butter (《性是牛油和麵包》)
- Asian Sex Workers' Stories (《亞洲性坊間》)

=== Photo album ===
- My Life—A photo album with 'sex workers photographing their own life/work'. (Published 2005). 40 sex workers (with 30 of them eventually displaying their pictures) photograph their own life and describe their own work. They choose on their own which pictures can be displayed and which can not, showing us everything about themselves unpretentiously.

=== Newsletters ===
Zi Teng publishes an online non periodical newsletter which covers happenings, issues and stories concerning the industry, workers and law both local and abroad.

=== T-shirts ===
5 styles, all can be bought online.

=== Free downloads ===
Name: Things To Know Before You Go (2002) by Zi Teng

- This is a handbook about migrant sex workers. The book includes the legal information on sex industry and immigration, relevant description on the livelihood of the sex sector and basic reference of supportive services provided by NGOs in various countries are essential for women sex workers.

== See also ==
- Legal system of Hong Kong
- Prostitution in China
- Prostitution in Hong Kong
- Sex141
