= List of radio stations in Hong Kong =

This is a list of radio stations in Hong Kong.

== Terrestrial radio stations ==
As of February 2025, there are three licensed broadcasters of terrestrial radio in Hong Kong, broadcasting on both MW (AM) and FM bands. An underground radio station "Citizens' Radio" used to also broadcasts on FM (without a licence), however it has since shut down in 2023.

Government radio-television station:

- Radio Television Hong Kong (RTHK)
  - RTHK Radio 1 (FM 92.6 MHz - 94.4 MHz)
  - RTHK Radio 2 (FM 94.8 MHz - 96.9 MHz)
  - RTHK Radio 3 (AM 567 kHz, AM 1584 kHz/FM 106.8 MHz Hong Kong South, FM 97.9 MHz Happy Valley, Jardine's Lookout, Parkview Corner, FM 107.8 MHz Tseung Kwan O, Tin Shui Wai)
  - RTHK Radio 4 (FM 97.6 MHz - 98.9 MHz)
  - RTHK Radio 5 (AM 783 kHz, FM 99.4 MHz Tseung Kwan O, FM 106.8 MHz Tuen Mun, Yuen Long, FM 92.3 MHzTin Shui Wai, FM 95.2 MHz Happy Valley, Jardine's Lookout, Parkview Corner)
  - RTHK Radio 6 (AM 675 kHz) (24-hour relay of China National Radio)
  - RTHK Putonghua Channel (AM 621 kHz, FM 100.9 MHz Causeway Bay, Wan Chai, Tuen Mun, FM 103.3 MHz Tseung Kwan O, Tin Shui Wai)
  - RTHK Radio The Greater Bay (FM 102.8 MHz)

Commercial radio stations:

- Commercial Radio
  - Supercharged 881 (FM 88.1 MHz - 89.5 MHz)
  - Ultimate 903 (FM 90.3 MHz - 92.1 MHz)
  - AM864 (AM 864 kHz)
- Metro Radio Hong Kong
  - Metro Info (FM 99.7 MHz - 102.1 MHz)
  - Metro Finance (FM 102.4 MHz - 106.3 MHz)
  - Metro Plus (AM 1044 kHz)

Underground radio station:

- Citizens' Radio
  - FM1028 (FM 102.8 MHz)
- www.hklatino.com

== Cessation of digital audio broadcasting (DAB) ==
Four digital radio broadcasters operated in Hong Kong from 2010 to 2017. Following the withdrawal of the three commercial broadcasters and a review of DAB services, the government announced that all five remaining DAB stations operated by RTHK will cease from 4 September 2017.

== Internet radio stations ==
=== In operation ===
- Apple FM (Since 2002)
  - Format: Western oldies 50's to 80's with some local hits.
- AXR Hong Kong
  - Genre: Western pop, rock and chart music from the 80s to today, International News and Sport, local what's on and events. Available at AXR Hong Kong
  - Slogan: Music Hong Kong Likes
  - D100 Radio (Since 2012)
    - PBS台 (Free)
    - 香港台 (Membership)
    - 第三台 (Membership)
    - 第四台 (Membership)
      - D100
- Edmond Poon 恐怖在線
- HK Peanuts 香港花生
- Made in Hong Kong TV 香港製造網絡電視 (Since 2017)
- memehk 謎米香港 (Since 2013)
- MyRadio (Since 2007)
- onairpower.com 重力媒體 (Since 2006)
- OurRadio 網上電台 (Since 2007)
- Passion Times 熱血時報 (Since 2012)
- Radio Lantau
  - Genre: Surf, Instrumental, Punk, Powerpop Funk, Soul, Jazz and Alternative Rock
- RagaZine (Since 2012)
- Talkonly 講台
- W-Channel 王道財經
  - Genre: Financial News

=== Ceased operation ===
- Channel i
- Education Channel
- Ears Online
- FM101
- Gay Radio Hong Kong
- Lesbian Radio Hong Kong
- HKGFM
  - Asia Hitz
  - Awesome 80s
  - Chill-Out
  - Classics Rewind
  - The Indie Underground
  - HKGFM Club
  - Today's Mix
  - The 90s
- HK Nepali Radio (Nepali Language)
- Holy Vision Radio (Nepali Language)
- Hong Kong People Reporter 香港人網
- IBHK (Internet Broadcasting Hong Kong)
  - IBHK Radio One (News and Politics)
    - IBHK HD One
    - IBHK HD Two
  - IBHK Radio Two (Infotainment)
  - IBHK Radio Three (Asian Pop)
  - IBHK Radio Four (Classical Music)
- Open Radio Hong Kong 開台
- People's Radio Hong Kong 香港人民廣播電台
- PPStation
- Radio Mangsebung (Nepali Language)
- Stage
- Citizens' Radio 民間電台 (FM 102.8 MHz) (2005 - 2023)

== See also ==
- Media of Hong Kong
- People's Radio Hong Kong
