= Chinese ship Xiamen =

Xiamen is the name of the following ships of the People's Liberation Army Navy, named for the city of Xiamen:

- Chinese destroyer Xiamen, a Type 052D destroyer commissioned in 2017
- Chinese frigate Xiamen, a Type 053 frigate launched in 1975, decommissioned in 2013, now a museum ship in Taizhou, Jiangsu

== See also ==
- Xiamen (disambiguation)
