= Amoy Street =

Amoy Street is the name of the following streets:

- Amoy Street (Hong Kong) in Wan Chai, Hong Kong Island, Hong Kong
- Amoy Street, Singapore in Chinatown, Singapore
- Amoy Street (Southampton), a 19th Century housing development in the Bedford Place area of Southampton, in the UK.
