= Johnston Road =

Road in Hong Kong

Coordinates: 22.27656°N 114.17099°E

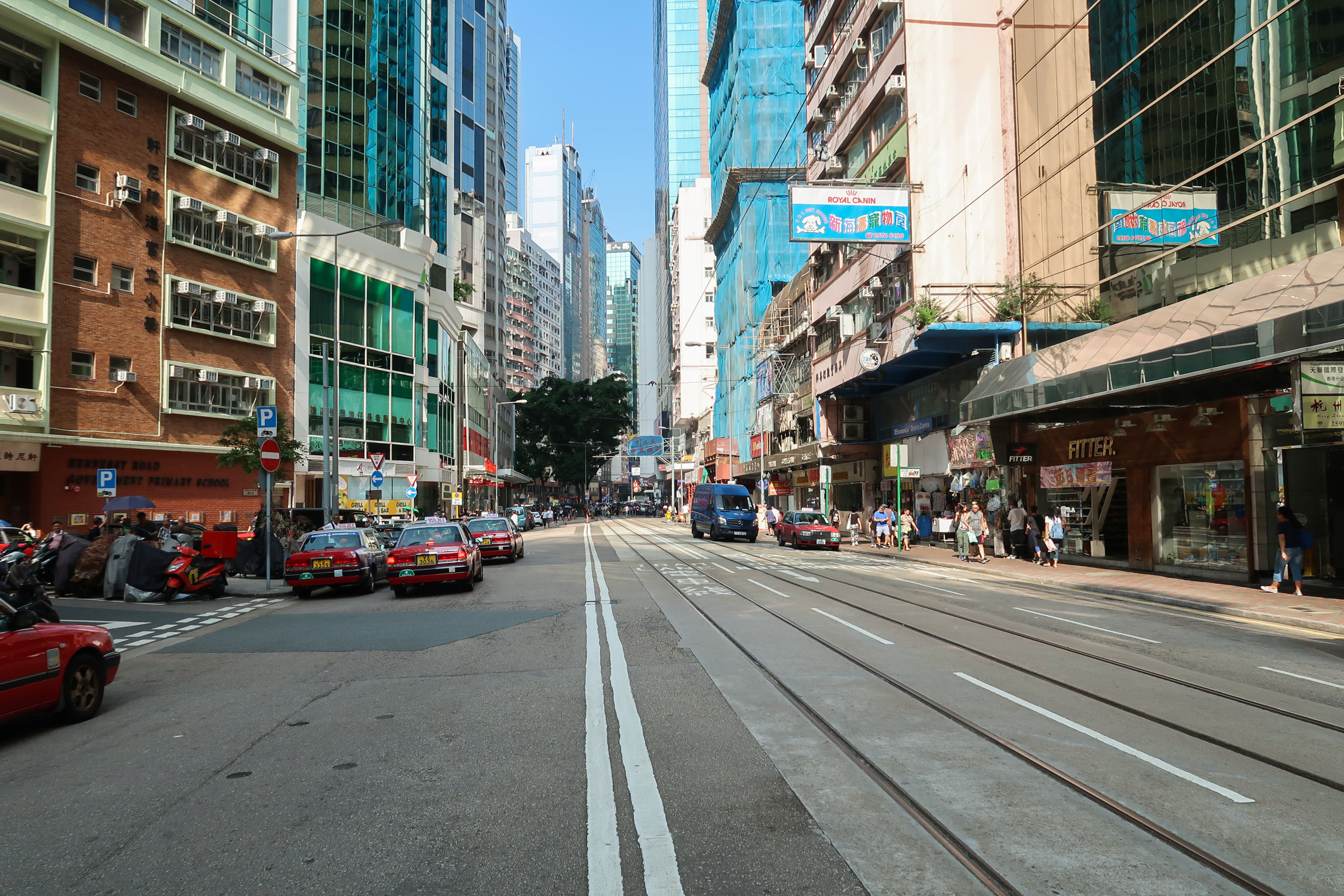
- Junction of Johnston Road with Thomson Road
- Interactive map of Johnston Road
- Native name: 莊士敦道 (Yue Chinese)
- Former name: Strand Road
- Namesake: Alexander Robert Johnston
- Length: 850 metres (2,790 ft)
- Location: Wan Chai, Hong Kong
- East end: Hennessy Road / Heard Street
- West end: Hennessy Road / Landale Street

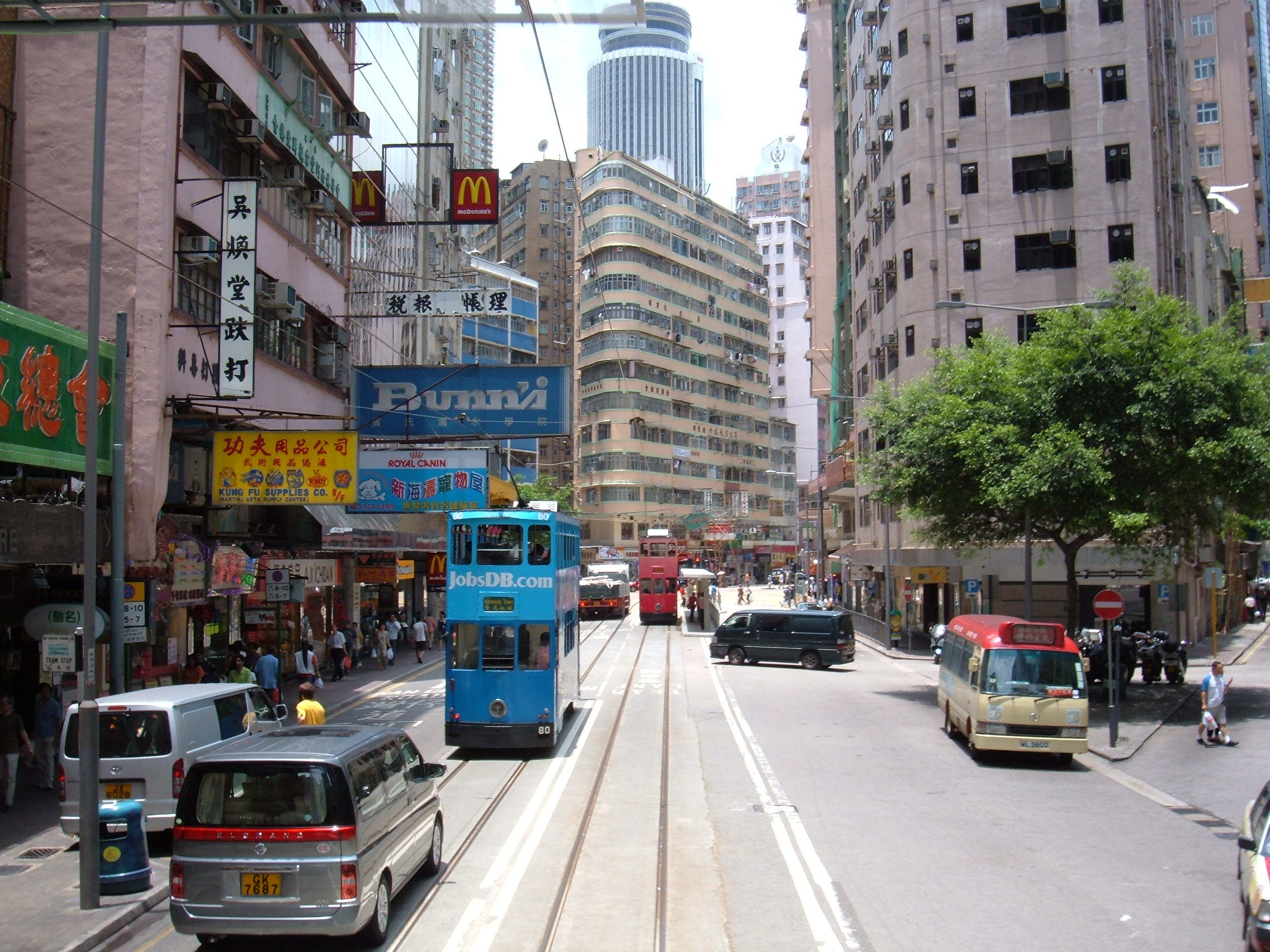
View of the eastern part of Johnston Road, near the Caltex petrol station in May 2007, looking southwest. The May Wah Building is visible in the centre of the picture.

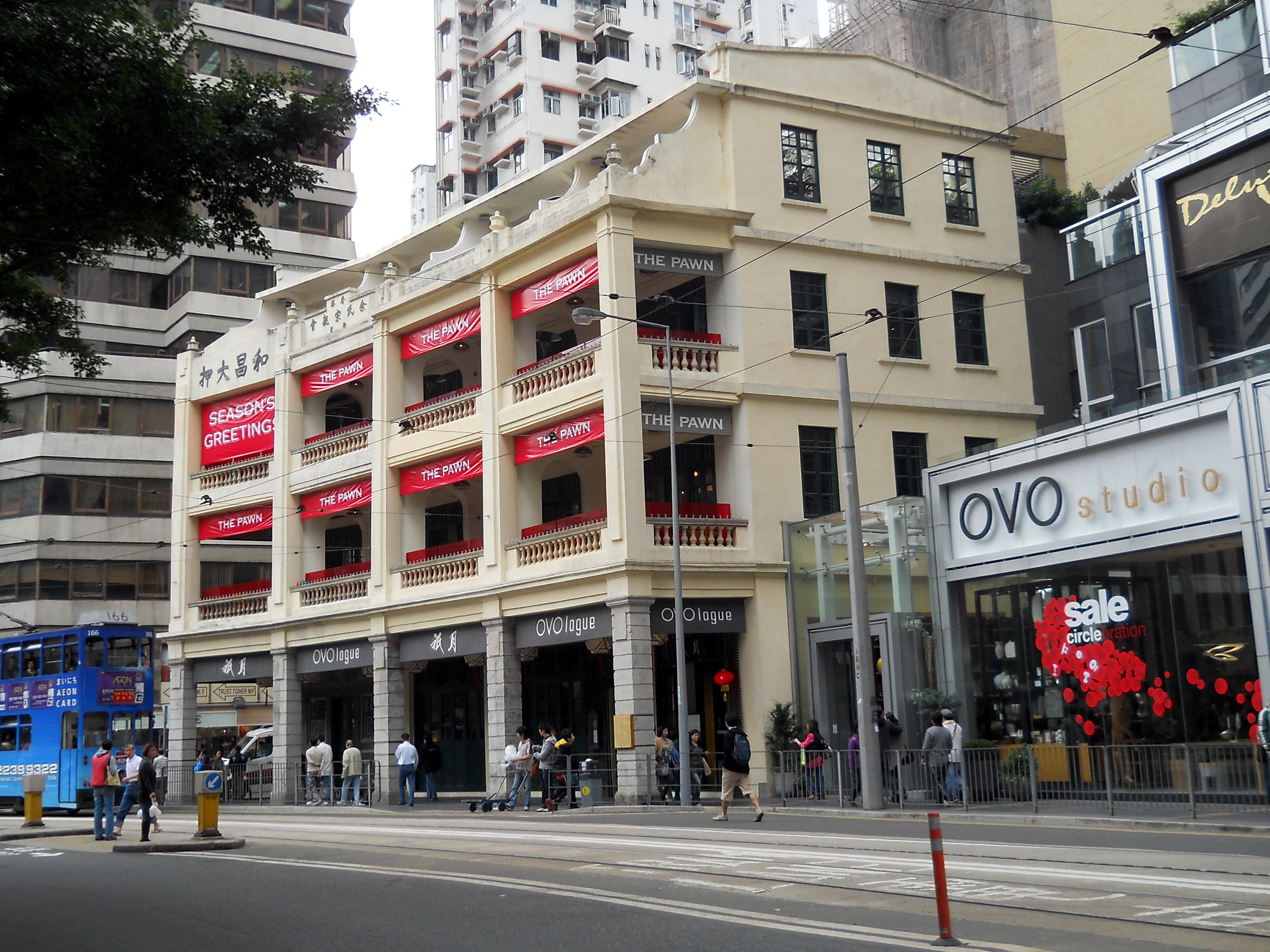
The renovated building occupying Nos. 60-66 Johnston Road in December 2010

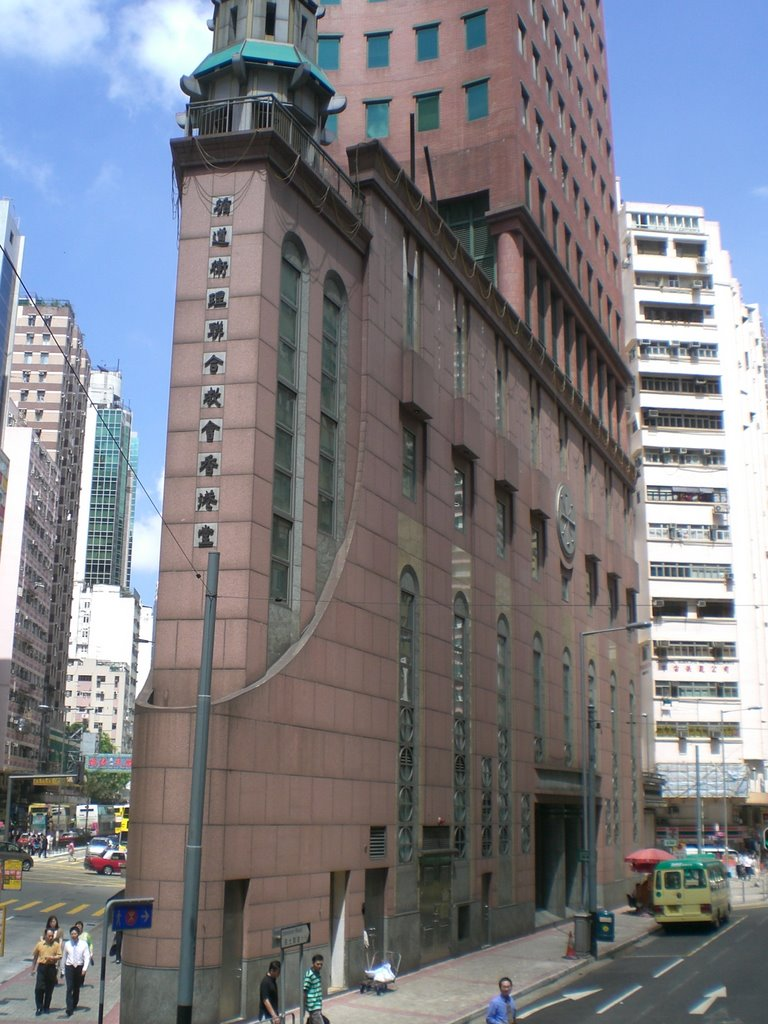
Chinese Methodist Church at the western end of Johnston Road in June 2007.

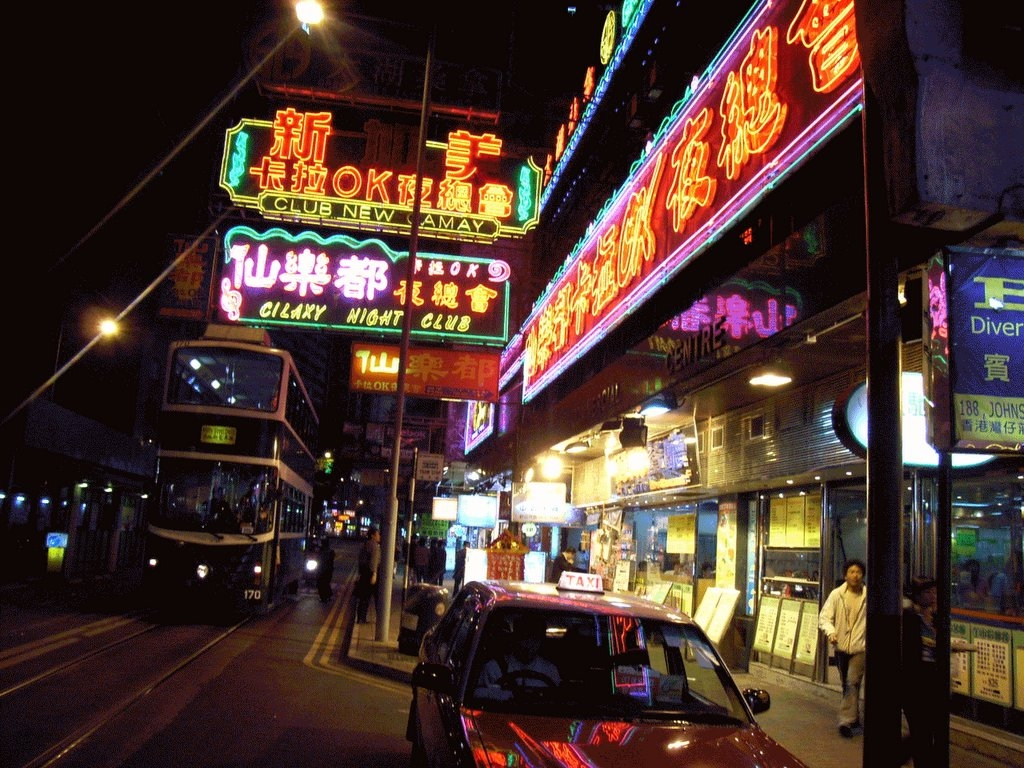
Nightclubs with vintage neon signs on Johnston Road in April 2006

Johnston Road (traditional Chinese: 莊士敦道; simplified Chinese: 庄士敦道; Jyutping: jong1 si6 deun1 dou6; pinyin: Zhuāngshìdūn Dào) is a major road in Wan Chai, Hong Kong Island.

== Location ==
Johnston Road begins where the tram tracks diverge from Hennessy Road by the iconic Chinese Methodist Church, and ends where it rejoins Hennessy Road by the Caltex petrol station, where all vehicular traffic – except for trams, which continue eastward towards Causeway Bay – is obliged to turn left onto Hennessy Road's westbound carriageway The shape of the road resembles a bow, with the string being Hennessy Road.

== History ==
The road was named after Alexander Robert Johnston, the British Deputy Superintendent of Trade during the First Opium War. He was the government administrator even before Sir Henry Pottinger was appointed the first Hong Kong governor in 1842. The story that the street was named after Sir Reginald Johnston is a myth.

Although the road was named in 1920s, part of its history can be traced back to 1851 or earlier when the area was known as Praya East. The section from Spring Garden Lane to Wan Chai Road was known as Strand Road, due to its proximity to the waterfront.

The road is built on the margins of the oldest building cluster in Wan Chai. Many residents are trying to preserve the old buildings and trees on Johnston Road from redevelopment.

== Intersections ==
The entire route is in Wan Chai, Wan Chai District.

km	mi	Destinations	Notes
0.00– 0.05	0.00– 0.031	Hennessy Road	To/from westbound Hennessy Road
0.04	0.025	Mallory Street	Access from Mallory Street to westbound Johnston Road only
0.09	0.056	Burrows Street	
0.13– 0.16	0.081– 0.099	Thomson Road	
0.25	0.16	Fleming Road / Wan Chai Road	
0.30	0.19	Triangle Street	
0.35	0.22	Tai Wo Street	
0.39	0.24	Stone Nullah Lane	
0.40	0.25	O'Brien Road	
0.44	0.27	Tai Yuen Street	
0.47	0.29	Spring Garden Lane	
0.53	0.33	Amoy Street	
0.56	0.35	Swatow Street	Westbound only
0.60	0.37	Luard Road	
0.64	0.40	Ship Street	
0.69	0.43	Lun Fat Street	
0.75	0.47	Gresson Street	
0.80	0.50	Li Chit Street	Closed to traffic
0.84	0.52	Landale Street	Access from Landale Street to westbound Johnston Road only
0.87	0.54	Hennessy Road	To/from westbound Hennessy Road
1.000 mi = 1.609 km; 1.000 km = 0.621 mi: Closed/former; Incomplete access

== Transport ==
Johnston Road is served by Green Minibus routes 4B & 35M, and Citybus routes 37B, 37X, 75, 90, & 97 – all of which stop outside the Southorn Playground.

Trams run along the length of the road in both directions.

Exits "D" & "A3" of the Wan Chai MTR station are located on Johnston Road.

== In popular culture ==
The junction of Johnston Road and Wan Chai Road was a Pit Stop in the eleventh leg of the American reality TV show The Amazing Race 30.

== See also ==
- List of streets and roads in Hong Kong
- Queen's Road East, for a list of thoroughfares connecting Johnston Road and Queen's Road East
- May Wah Building, located at Nos. 164-176 Johnston Road
