= Swatow Street =

Street in Hong Kong

Coordinates: 22.27575°N 114.17169°E

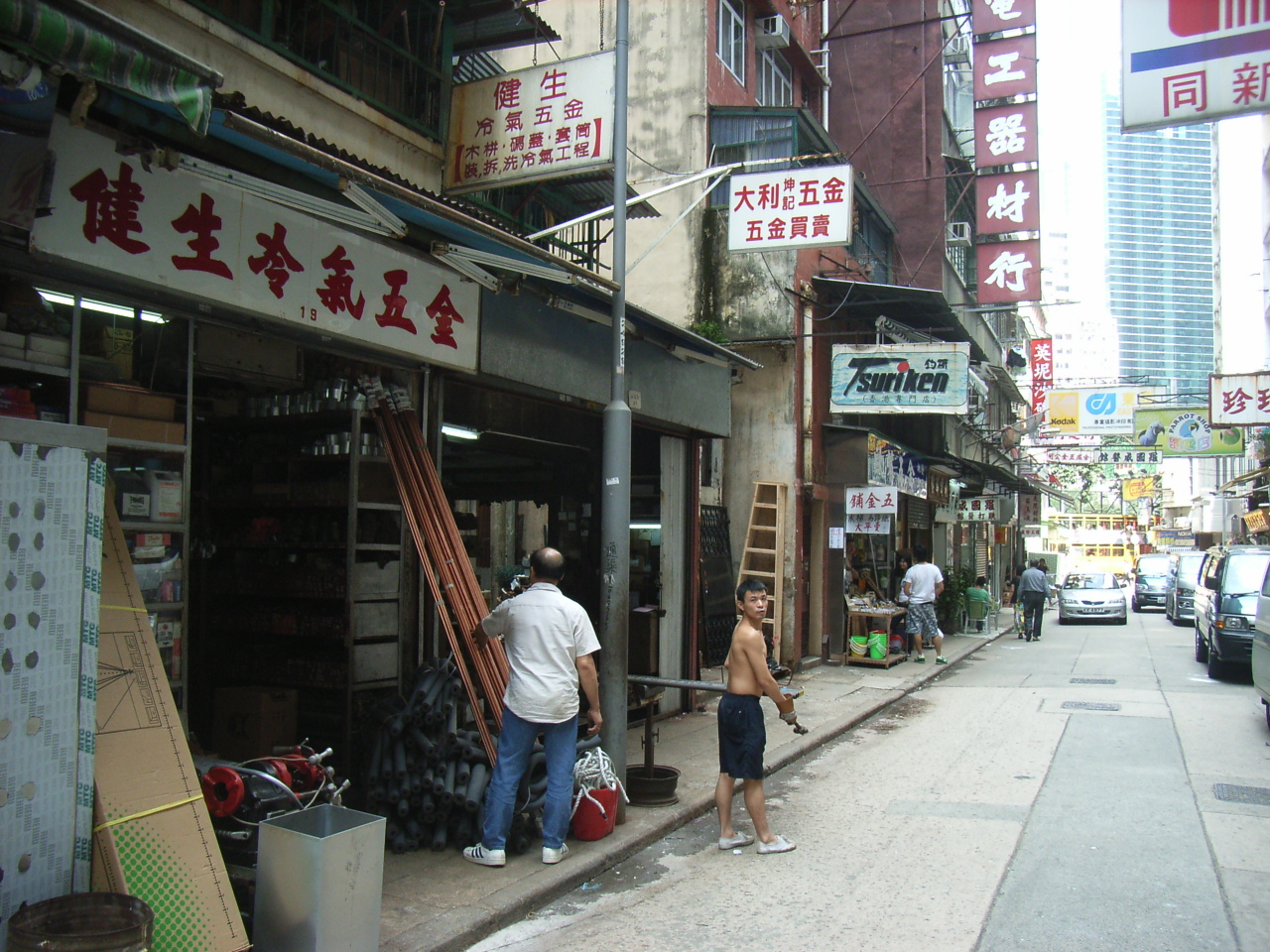
A hardware store on Swatow Street in November 2006.

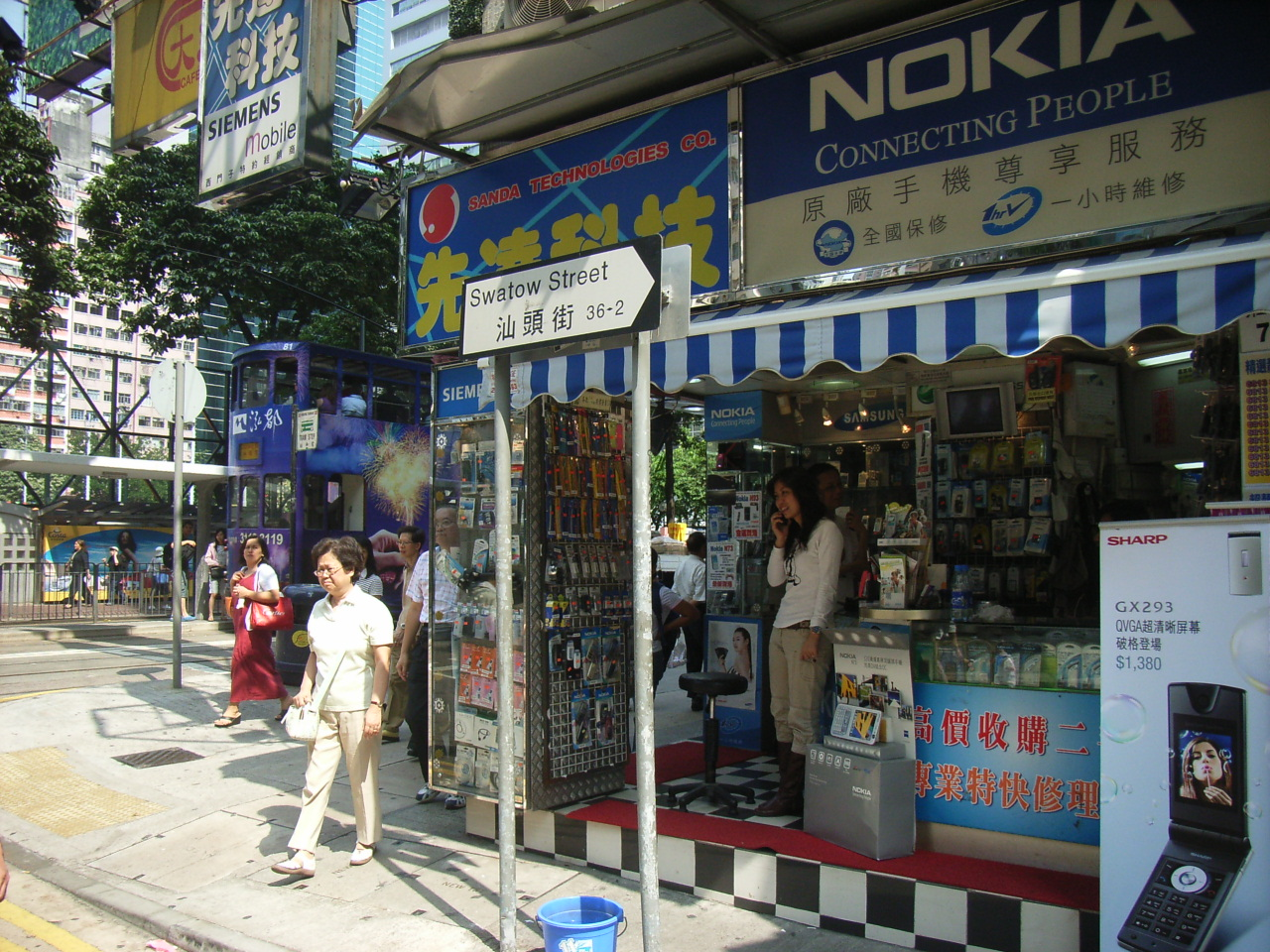
A shop selling mobile phone accessories on the corner of Swatow Street and Johnston Street in November 2006. It has since been replaced by the luxury mixed-use building The Johnston.

Swatow Street (Chinese: 汕頭街) is a cul-de-sac in Wan Chai, Hong Kong Island. It runs from north to south in a straight line from Johnston Road to Queen's Road East; a short flight of steps at the end of the street precludes vehicular access to the latter.

Swatow is the old name of Shantou, a prefecture-level city on the eastern coast of Guangdong Province, China, and is also the Teochew pronunciation of the name.

== History ==
Before it caught the eyes of Lancelot Dent, the eponymous taipan of Dent & Co., Wan Chai had only a few dozen inhabitants who eked a living out of quarrying. Dent saw the potential of Wan Chai, and had designs to develop it into a commercial base. Having won the bid for Wan Chai's coastal lots, Dent employed his team of quarrymen to shift the coastline from Queen's Road East to present day Johnston Road in the early 1850s through the process of land reclamation.

As the original dock area moved inland, Swatow Street and neighbouring Amoy Street came into being, their names taken from the Teochew and Minnan dialects used locally at the time. Dent's efforts paid off, and Wan Chai developed into a bustling and significant commercial centre for maritime trade.
