= Sex141 =

Hong Kong information network for sex workers

- Home page
- Website type: Directory
- Available in: English, Chinese
- Owner: March Computer Company (defunct)
- Founder: Chan Sai-ngan
- Revenue: HK$60m
- Website: go141.com sex141.com sex141.hk nightlife141.com 141sex161.com hk-141sex.com
- Commercial: Yes
- Registration: Optional
- Launched: 2002; 24 years ago
- Current status: Active

Sex141 is the most active information network in Hong Kong for sex workers, established in 2002 as an advertising platform. Although two generations of its supposed principals were arrested and tried, it continued to enjoy a near-monopoly of the online Hong Kong sex trade.

In December 2013, New Territories South Police shut down Sex141 and claimed a victory in neutralising the vice ring that was behind the website. During raids on 38 locations in the territory, 114 people, including the alleged mastermind and his wife, were arrested.

== History ==
Sex141 was founded in 2002 by a HKUST graduate, Chan Sai-ngan (陳世雁), and Cheung Ming-man (張明文), to offer on-line advertising to sex workers.

In 2005, the two programmers who created the site were convicted of one count each of "conspiring to live off the earnings of prostitution arising from the ads that appeared on their website". They were each fined $100,000 and given a suspended prison sentence of eight months.

The site was taken over by former University of Hong Kong student Pang Man-wai (彭文偉) and Yan Guobing/Yim Kwok-bun (嚴國彬), who both commenced pimping to increase revenues. Both were eventually arrested in 2007 and sentenced to imprisonment for two to two and a half years. In 2006 the owners relocated its web server to the United States. After the second generation at the helm of the site were arrested, websites continued to operate, further expanding into directories for Macau, Taiwan, and Thailand using the Nightlife141.com domain name. Apple Daily reported that an unnamed US official had privately named this site fuelling prostitution, endangering Asia.

Time Out described the site as "Wikipedia for whoremongers", and records it as the 36th most popular website in Hong Kong at one time. Until the site was shut down by the authorities in early December 2013, it enjoyed a near-monopoly of the local on-line sex industry. In July 2013, Sex141 was ranked 126th busiest website in Hong Kong, while its two closest competitors, Miss148.com and 161Sex.com, were respectively ranked 1,088th and 1,638th.

=== December 2013 raids ===
Early in December 2013, police claimed a victory in neutralising the vice ring that was behind sex141.com in a coordinated operation over three days involving 250 officers from the Special Duty Squad, Immigration Department, Commercial Crimes Bureau and officers from the Serious Crimes Bureau of New Territories South Police. The police raided 38 locations throughout the territory of Hong Kong, including the syndicate's North Point headquarters, various locations in Kowloon and the New Territories, and dismantled four closely linked illegal prostitution call centres.

At a press briefing, police said the syndicate "provided a comprehensive service to sex workers and organised prostitution groups. When they knew there were sex workers coming to Hong Kong, the syndicate would arrange a make-up service and photographers" Police disclosed that among those arrested were arrested 114 people, including eight senior members of the site and 78 sex workers (aged 17–31). Cards, condoms, computers and $3.2 million in cash were seized, and an estimated $12 million in suspected proceeds of crime were frozen.

== Business model ==
A typical profile page

Costing HK$5,100–18,200 (US$650–2,300) for each mainland group and HK$1,300–1,500 (US$170–192) a month for each local, detailed profiles can be placed on the bilingual website. Details consist of name, age, race, languages, working hours, cost, address, measurements, photo gallery, transport directions, a Google map, and a personal description. The profiles can be sorted by districts, of which there are 26, and by address. For an additional fee, the company can arrange for videos and photos to be taken and make-up to be done. Details published on the website are carried in its monthly 141 magazine. The images are heavily airbrushed. In addition to the detailed advertisements for thousands of sex workers, escorts and massage parlours, there are many often detailed user-generated reviews of customer experiences, chat forums, candid photos and videos of the girls at work.

The site has a fee-paying membership system, called the "sponsored member scheme". Different types of memberships, costing HK$300, HK$1,000 or HK$8,800, have different user rights, depending on which they may access or edit monetised content. For example, they may take or view the sex workers' photos, read service reviews, watch videos and use other functions. Credits can be earned in the forum to 'buy' more rights. To supplement site revenues, "Star of Today – Flower Box" was introduced on the main page. "Clients" supposedly buy virtual flowers for the sex workers. However, it has been reported that the sex workers are paying HK$300 (about US$40) to get themselves 30 virtual flowers from the system for self-promotion. The "Money-Drop Review" is a feature added in around 2013. The site staff advise workers to hire named, supposedly independent, ghost-writers to write positive reviews.

The police allege that many telephone numbers on the advertisements belonged to the syndicate, which acted as intermediaries for sex workers. They further allege that the syndicate was engaged in money laundering using puppet accounts of companies in payment default.

=== Smear allegations and "money-drop review" scam ===
House News first wrote in June 2013 of a sex worker who wrote an article on the Internet alleging that Sex141.com forum published negative reviews that discredited her, thus forcing her to pay over up to tens of thousands of dollars for positive reviews to be written to restore her reputation. She alleged that the network is condoning the situation. Apple Daily also reported that two organisations dedicated to helping sex workers, Zi Teng and AFRO, had received complaints that sex141.com had been scamming sex workers. It was alleged that the group deliberately encourages negative "money-drop reviews", expected to generating more revenues, either the HK$200 (approx. $25) charged to anxious members for each deletion, or induced hiring of "ghostwriters" to seed favourable reviews.
