= Prostitution in Hong Kong =

Prostitution in Hong Kong is itself legal, but organised prostitution is illegal, as there are laws against keeping a vice establishment, causing or procuring another to be a prostitute, living on the prostitution of others, or public solicitation.

The most visible public venues for sex workers in Hong Kong, especially for tourists, are massage parlours and the so-called "Japanese style night clubs". However, most of the commercial sex worker industry consists of women working in small, usually one room apartments, usually referred to as "one-woman brothels", the equivalent of the "Soho walk-up" in the United Kingdom. They advertise for clients through the Internet and local classifieds. Most popular mainstream newspapers will carry such classifieds with brothel guides as an insert within racing form guides. Yellow neon advertising boxes were used to advertise sexual services to such an extent that "yellow" (黃) became synonymous with prostitution.

== History ==
In an attempt to prevent the spread of STIs, the authorities introduced "Hong Kong Ordinance No 12" in 1857. This required all brothels to be registered and workers to undergo regular health checks. Population census in 1865 and 1866 recorded 81 and 134 "Chinese brothel keepers". The 1874 Annual Report of the Colonial Surgeon reported that there were "123 licensed Chinese brothels, containing 1,358 prostitutes". From 1879 to 1932, prostitution was legal and regulated, and prostitutes were required to register for licenses, pay tax, and have regular health examination. Prostitution boomed in the districts of Sai Ying Pun, Wan Chai, Mong Kok and Yau Ma Tei. In 1930 Hong Kong, with a population of 840,000, boasted 200 legal brothels with over 7,000 licensed prostitutes. But in 1932, the Hong Kong government issued a ban on prostitution and three years later licensed prostitution ended. From that time on, prostitution was permitted within strict limits while prohibiting a whole host of activities surrounding prostitution, such as soliciting for sex and living off "immoral earnings" (working as a pimp). It has also attracted prostitutes from other countries. Most of them have come from Southeast Asia, and even from Europe and the United States.

Although organised prostitution is illegal, the industry had always been under the influence of triads to recruit economically disadvantaged women who otherwise would never enter the profession voluntarily. Until the 1980s, most Hong Kong underground sex establishments were run by gangsters. During the 1990s, however, Hong Kong saw a massive shift in the form of prostitution. There was an influx of "northern girls" (Chinese: 北姑) from mainland China who worked as prostitutes illegally in Hong Kong on their short tourist visas; local voluntary prostitutes also increased dramatically in number. As a result, gangsters could no longer make a profit by coercion and their controlling power declined.

=== Early red light districts ===
Lyndhurst Terrace and the surrounding area were the location of some of the earliest brothels established in Hong Kong, in the mid-19th century. The Cantonese name of the street, 擺花 (pai fa) literally means "flower arrangement", possibly because of presence of numerous stalls in the area in the mid-19th century, selling flowers to the customers of the nearby brothels. The name of Lyndhurst Terrace appears in this context in James Joyce's Finnegans Wake, published in 1939. Western prostitutes concentrated there, while Chinese brothels were located in the Tai Ping Shan area near Po Hing Fong. The Chinese writer Wang Tao wrote in 1860 that Tai Ping Shan Street was full of brothels: "gaudy houses, sporting brightly painted doors and windows with fancy curtains". The brothels gradually moved to Possession Street and relocated to Shek Tong Tsui in 1903.

From 1884 to 1887 many brothels were declared by the Government to be unlicensed and closed down. These were mainly in First, Second and Third Street, but also in Sheung Fung Lane, Ui on Lane and Centre Street.

In the early 1900s Spring Garden Lane and Sam Pan Street (三板街) in Wan Chai became a red-light district with western and Chinese prostitutes. To attract attention, brothels were displaying large street number plates, and the area became known as "Big Number Brothels".

=== Tanka prostitutes ===
The Tanka people, an ethnic minority in coastal South China, were a source of prostitutes for the sailors of the British Empire. The Tanka in Hong Kong were considered "outcasts" and categorised as low class.

Ordinary Chinese prostitutes were afraid of serving Westerners since they looked strange to them, while the Tanka prostitutes freely mingled with Western men. The Tanka assisted the Europeans with supplies and providing them with prostitutes. Low class European men in Hong Kong easily formed relations with the Tanka prostitutes. The profession of prostitution among the Tanka women led to them being hated by the Chinese both because they had sex with westerners and because the Tanka were seen as racially inferior.

Tanka prostitutes were considered "low class", greedy for money, arrogant, and liable to treat their clients badly. They had a reputation for punching their clients or mocking them by calling them names. Nevertheless, their brothels were said to be well kept and tidy. A fictional story written in the 1800s described western items decorating the rooms of Tanka prostitutes.

The stereotype among most Chinese in Canton that all Tanka women were prostitutes was common, leading the government during the Republican era to inflate the number of prostitutes when counting, due to all Tanka women being included. The Tanka women were viewed as such that their prostitution activities were considered part of the normal bustle of a commercial trading city.

Tanka women were ostracised from the Cantonese community, and were nicknamed "salt water girls" (咸水妹 ham shui mui in Cantonese) for their services as prostitutes to foreigners in Hong Kong.

Tanka women who worked as prostitutes for foreigners also commonly kept a "nursery" of Tanka girls specifically for exporting them for prostitution work to overseas Chinese communities such as in Australia or America, or to serve as a Chinese or foreigner's concubine.

A report called "Correspondence respecting the alleged existence of Chinese slavery in Hong Kong: presented to both Houses of Parliament by Command of Her Majesty" was presented to the English Parliament in 1882 concerning the existence of slavery in Hong Kong, which involved many Tanka girls serving as prostitutes or mistresses to westerners.

=== Japanese prostitutes ===
Japanese prostitutes called Karayuki-san, many coming from poor villages in Kyushu, started coming to Hong Kong in 1879, and constituted the majority of Japanese residents of the territory in the 1880s and 1890s. There were 13 licensed Japanese brothels and 132 prostitutes in Hong Kong in 1901, with the figure reaching a peak of 172 in 1908. Initially located in Central, the Japanese brothels later moved to Wan Chai.

== Types and venues ==
- Street prostitutes: They may sometimes be seen on the pavements of Yau Ma Tei, Sham Shui Po, Tsuen Wan, Yuen Long and Tuen Mun. Usually pimps or gangsters are not involved and the prostitute will loiter in the street in search of customers. After a deal is struck, they would go to a love hotel. Before the Asian financial crisis in 1998, street prostitutes would offer a "set course" of services; after that, the set price dropped by half. Some girls will hang around the lobbies of hotels, and will even knock on the doors of the rooms of single men after being tipped off by the concierge. In more down-market accommodation the concierge may ask customers if they require company. American and other European prostitutes generally charge higher and are generally located in the business district of Central.

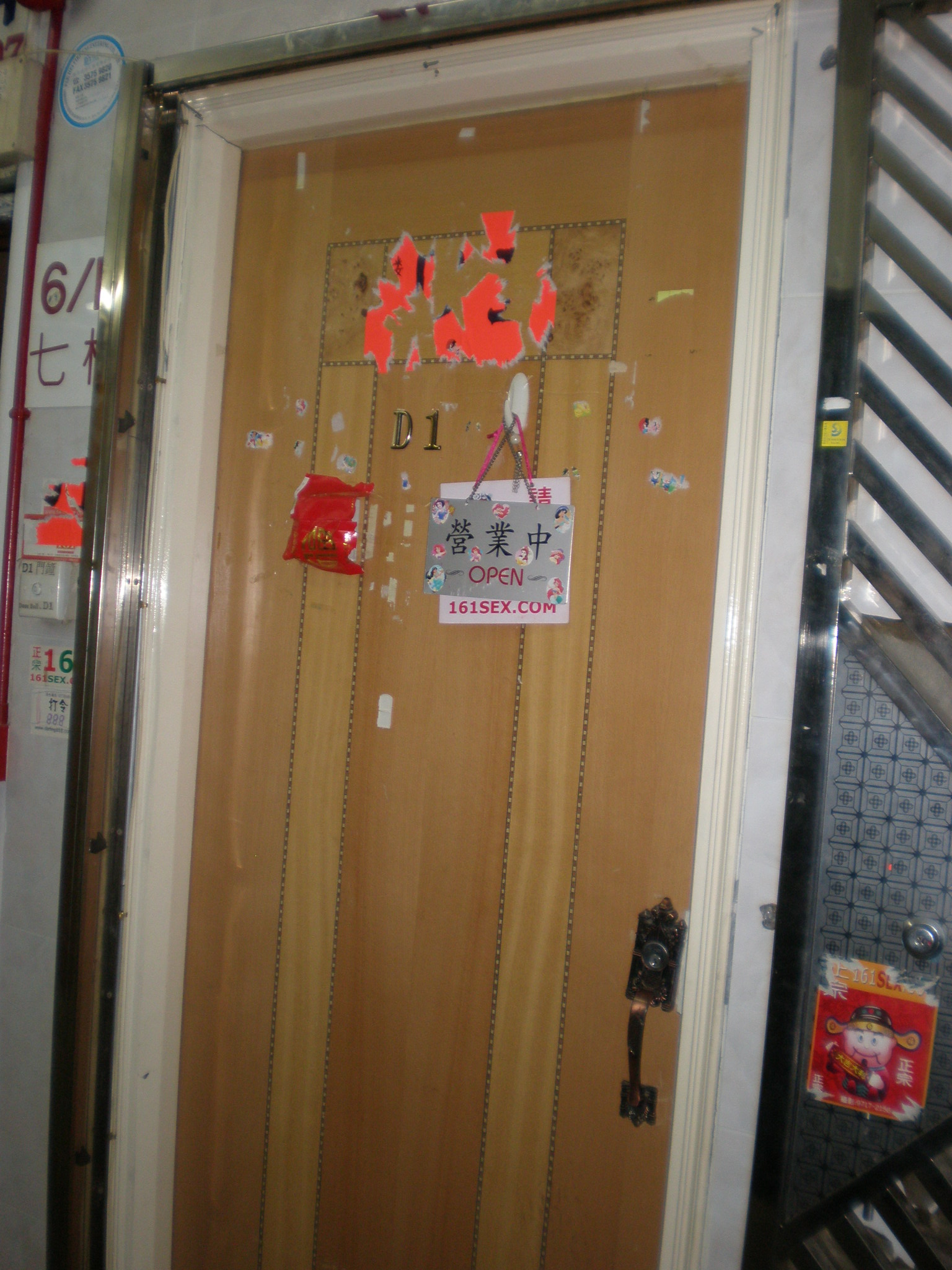
An apartment in Kowloon with a sticker for the website 161sex.com and an "open" sign

- One-woman brothel: (一樓一鳳 jat1 lau4 jat1 fung2 Yīlóu-yīfèng): By Hong Kong law it is illegal for two or more prostitutes to work in the same premises. As a result, the most common form of legal prostitution in Hong Kong is the so-called "one-woman brothel", where one woman receives customers in her apartment. The expense of the older centres of such activity has led to towns in the New Territories such as Yuen Long and Sheung Shui becoming centres for the one-woman brothel trade. This law however has little influence on the density of prostitute activity, the nature of Hong Kong housing meaning that entire floors of some buildings or even whole apartment blocks may consist of one woman brothels, with in some the letter of the law being adhered to by the subdivision of flats into multiple individual dwellings.
- Saunas and massage parlours: Ostensibly these are regular saunas with the management turning a blind eye to other services the masseuses may offer. Usually the "menu" on offer will fall just short of vaginal intercourse, with manual sex ("hand-job"), breasts ("milk-job" or "Russian") and oral sex ("BJ") being amongst the services available after negotiation.
- Night club workers: The term nightclub in Hong Kong is being driven from general use for being used as a euphemism for hostess clubs. Hostesses receive a basic retainer and commission for having customers buy expensive drinks, customers pay the club for the privilege of taking the girls out by paying a "bar fine" and buying out the girls "time", whatever comes after being a matter of negotiation between the customer and hostess. A similar format can be found at some karaoke lounges with private rooms. Those that operate under the front of internet cafes have also existed but all were shut down in 2004.
- Freelance: The growth of the Internet has facilitated a practice similar to "compensated dating" or "escorting" with amateur prostitutes offering their services on message boards and forums. CNN reported in 2009 that social workers had found "compensated dating" was growing among Hong Kong teenage girls, the caseload of girls engaging in this practice had doubled in two years, the girls engaging in this practice had cut across socioeconomic levels, and Hong Kong legal experts said the practice was a form of prostitution. CNN reported that students, often teenagers, sell sex so they can buy consumer goods such as cell phones and clothes. Hong Kong social worker Chiu Tak-Choi said that most girls who engage in compensated dating do not view themselves as prostitutes.

== Migrant sex workers ==
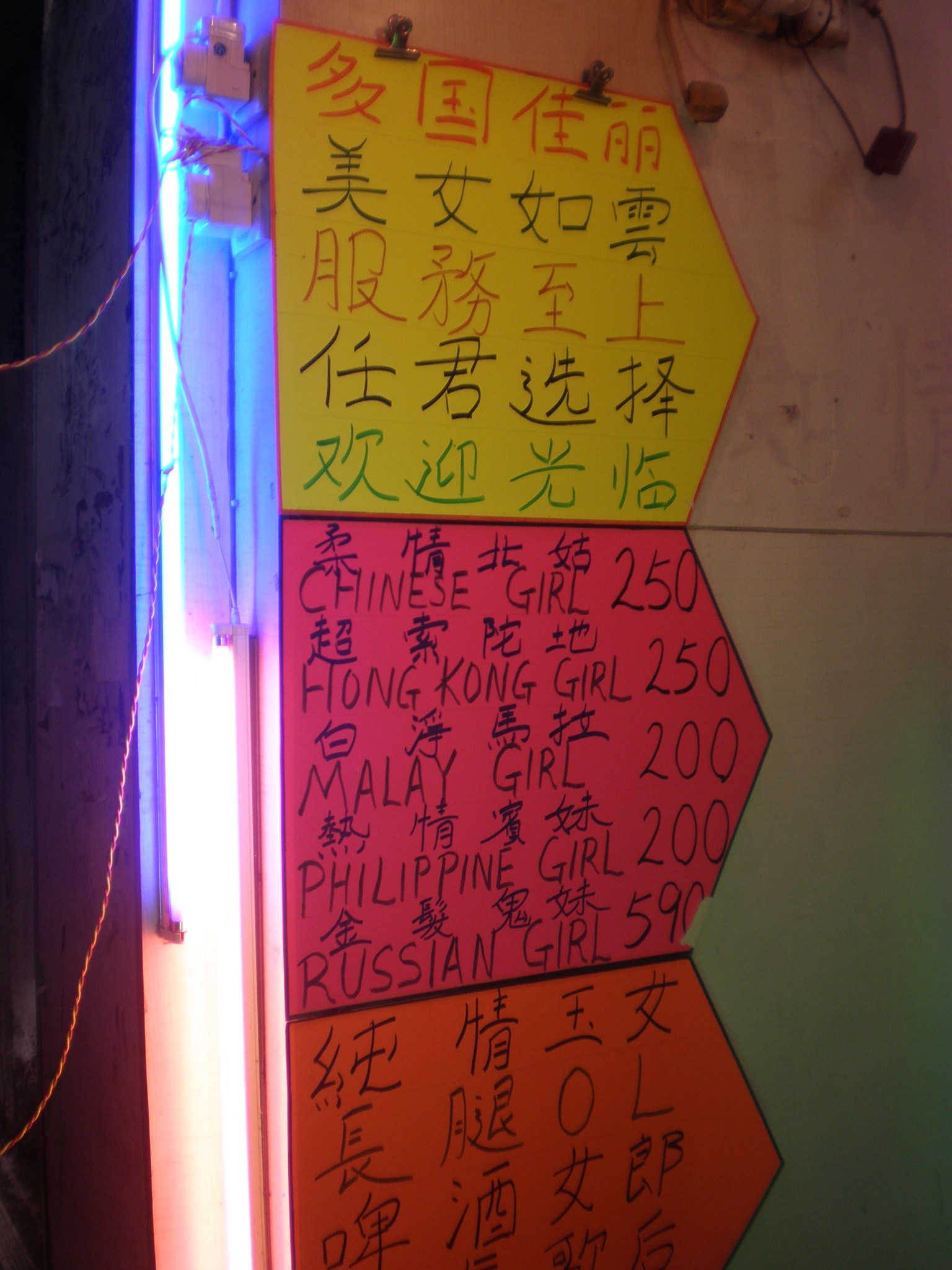
A handwritten sign advertising the prices for various nationalities of women outside a brothel on Soy Street in Kowloon.

=== Thailand and Philippines ===
These sex workers are particularly visible in the Wan Chai district, catering mainly to Western businessmen and tourists. The sex workers operating in this area are predominantly Thai (including transsexuals) and Filipino. Many work on a freelance basis in Wan Chai bars and discothèques.

There are several NGOs that work closely with sex workers in Hong Kong; these include Ziteng and Aids Concern. Ziteng campaigns for changes in the law, in particular the overturn of ban on brothels with more than one prostitute, since this prevents sex workers banding together for protection.

Many migrant sex workers arrive on a short tourist visa and try to make as much money as possible by prostituting illegally before leaving Hong Kong, some returning frequently. There are also "underground" organisations (such as Thai restaurants and escort bars) that arrange for foreign (usually Thai) and mainland girls to gain work in Hong Kong legally with an entertainment visa, but in fact they actually work in go-go bars in Wan Chai or other hostess clubs around Hong Kong.

=== Russia and East Europe ===
Prostitutes from Eastern Europe and Russia have also come to Hong Kong. Fake contracts, often for domestic service, facilitate trafficking in Hong Kong where a large number of East European women are also trafficked for prostitution purposes.

=== Mainland China ===
The majority of migrant sex workers who come to Hong Kong are from mainland China. It is reported that with RMB10,000–20,000, mainland Chinese girls would normally secure a three-month visa. Other frequent or previously deported visitors might experience tight visa requirements and would normally obtain only seven-day visas. Owing to the short stays and other expensive costs (to pay for the travel arrangements and cover the high cost of renting apartments, advertising etc. in Hong Kong), sex workers would exert all their energy and work from morning till night during their seven-day stay. The necessity to make money quickly also means that the sex workers are more likely to take risks. The advent of the Two-way Permit and relaxation of restrictions on mainlanders to visit Hong Kong has continued to fuel the supply of workers from the mainland, even though working would be in theory a violation of the visa conditions.

Many mainland girls advertise their services on websites where they put their pictures, contact numbers and service charges. The youngest and most attractive may offer their services to customers at three- or four-star hotels and provide their services there; their own accommodation is less likely to be of this quality, but usually within a walk or short ride away from the main clusters of hotels, to which they are led to by their pimps, known locally as "grooms" (馬伕).

Older, less attractive girls will find themselves working in the one-woman brothels as "phoenixes" (鳳), a term derived from the similarity of the Chinese word for prostitute to that of chicken (雞). Prices are lower than for girls who target the tourist hotels, variations in price being a product of location, with those working within the corridor formed by Nathan Road being on the whole higher than that found in the towns of the New Territories.

== Legal issues ==
Prostitution in Hong Kong is legal, but subject to various restrictions, mainly intended to keep it away from the public eye. These restrictions are manifested in the form of prohibiting a whole host of activities surrounding prostitution, including soliciting and advertising for sex, working as pimps, running brothels and organised prostitution. For instance, by the Hong Kong legal code Chapter 200 Section 147, any person who "solicits for any immoral purpose" in a public place may receive a maximum penalty of HK$10,000 ($1,280) and six months' imprisonment. In practice, a woman on the street in certain areas well known for streetwalkers such as Sham Shui Po might well be arrested even if seen smiling at a male passer-by. Advertisement of sex services, including signboards, illuminated signs and posters, is also prohibited, and an offence may result in imprisonment for 12 months. In a test case in 2005 involving sex141.com – an internet site created by two programmers who tailored on-line advertisements for prostitutes – its two principals were convicted of one count each of "conspiring to live off the earnings of prostitution arising from the ads that appeared on their website". They were each fined $100,000 ($12,800) and given a suspended sentence of eight months in prison. Time Out records it as the 36th most popular website in Hong Kong. As of November 2011, the site is active and ranks 47th most frequented site in Hong Kong. The site was shut down by the authorities in early December 2013 because the syndicate that controls it is allegedly engaged in activities that are otherwise illegal.

Organized prostitution, in the form of directing "over another person for the purpose of... that person's prostitution", is forbidden by Section 130, and an offence may result in 14 years of imprisonment. Sections 131 and 137, which are aimed at pimps, stipulate a jail sentence of seven years as the maximum penalty for "procuring another person to become a prostitute" and "living on earnings of prostitution of others". Under Hong Kong law, it is also illegal to organise arrangement of sex deals for more than one woman; violators are subject to a HK$20,000 fine and seven years' imprisonment. Therefore, if two women are found serving customers in the same apartment, it is an illegal brothel. This gives rise to the so-called "one-woman brothel" where one woman receives customers in her apartment. This is the most common form of legal prostitution in Hong Kong. The law prohibits the prostitution of girls below the age of 16 for vaginal sex, below 21 for anal sex and boys below 21 for gross indecency (嚴重猥褻).

=== Strategies to avoid the prohibition on brothels ===
Brothels are illegal, prostitution in private however is legal. So, many prostitutes in Hong Kong are "one for one" girls. To avoid the operation of an illegal brothel, triads will purchase apartments in certain apartment blocks – usually older tenements – for subdivision, and "sublet" them for amounts several times the prevailing rent for equivalent-sized units so that the letter of the law is complied with. The girls advertise their services on web sites or in local publications.

Another avoidance strategy is to operate a karaoke establishment and provide girls as entertainment or companionship only; the girls then take customers to an hourly hotel in the same building and pay for the room separately. Informal, individual prostitution is almost always available at discos or hotel bars, especially in the Tsim Sha Tsui and Wan Chai districts (the latter famous as the setting for The World of Suzie Wong). Occasionally the police raid the triad-run prostitution setups, but usually the only arrests made are for immigration violations.

== Sex trafficking ==
Hong Kong is primarily a destination, transit, and to a much lesser extent, a source territory for women and children subjected to sex trafficking. Victims include citizens from mainland China, Indonesia, the Philippines, Thailand, and other Southeast Asian countries as well as countries in South Asia, Africa, and South America. Criminal syndicates or acquaintances sometimes lure women to Hong Kong from the Philippines, South America, and mainland China using false promises of lucrative employment and force them into prostitution to repay money owed for passage to Hong Kong. Traffickers sometimes psychologically coerce sex trafficking victims by threatening to reveal photos or recordings of the victims' sexual encounters to their families.

The United States Department of State Office to Monitor and Combat Trafficking in Persons ranks Hong Kong as a 'Tier 2 Watch List' territory.

== Portrayal in media ==
=== Films ===
- The World of Suzie Wong (1961)
- The Call Girls (應召名冊) (1977)
- Girls Without Tomorrow aka. Call Girl 1988 (應召女郎一九八八) (1988)
- School on Fire (學校風雲) (1988), directed by Ringo Lam
- Hong Kong Gigolo (香港舞男) (1990), starring Simon Yam
- Queen of Temple Street (廟街皇后) (1990), directed by Lawrence Ah Mon
- Girls Without Tomorrow 1992 (現代應召女郎, 92應召女郎) (1992), starring Vivian Chow
- Call Girl '92 (92應召女郎) (1992)
- Call Girls '94 (94應召女郎) (1994)
- Durian Durian (榴槤飄飄, 榴槤飄香) (2000), directed by Fruit Chan
- Hollywood Hong-Kong (香港有個荷里活) (2001), directed by Fruit Chan
- Public Toilet (人民公廁) (2002), directed by Fruit Chan
- Golden Chicken (金雞) (2002), starring Sandra Ng
- Golden Chicken 2 (金雞2) (2004), starring Sandra Ng
- Whispers and Moans (性工作者十日談) (2007) a film by Herman Yau based on the book of the same name starring Athena Chu, and Mandy Chiang
- True Women For Sale (性工作者2: 我不賣身．我賣子宮) (2008), directed by Herman Yau, starring Prudence Liew and Race Wong
- Girl$ (囡囡) (2010), directed by Kenneth Bi
- Golden Chicken 3 aka. Golden Chickensss (金雞SSS) (2014)
- 12 Golden Ducks (12金鴨) (2015)

=== Books ===
Non-fiction

- Whispers and Moans: Interviews with the men and women of Hong Kong's sex industry by Yeeshan Yang (Blacksmith Books, 2006)

Fiction

- The World of Suzie Wong Richard Mason (1951)
- Suzie (2010)

== See also ==
- Zi Teng, a non-governmental organisation
- Prostitution in China
- Prostitution in Macau
- Prostitution in Tibet
- Contagious Diseases Acts, in the 19th-century United Kingdom
