= Mallory Street, Hong Kong =

Street in Hong Kong

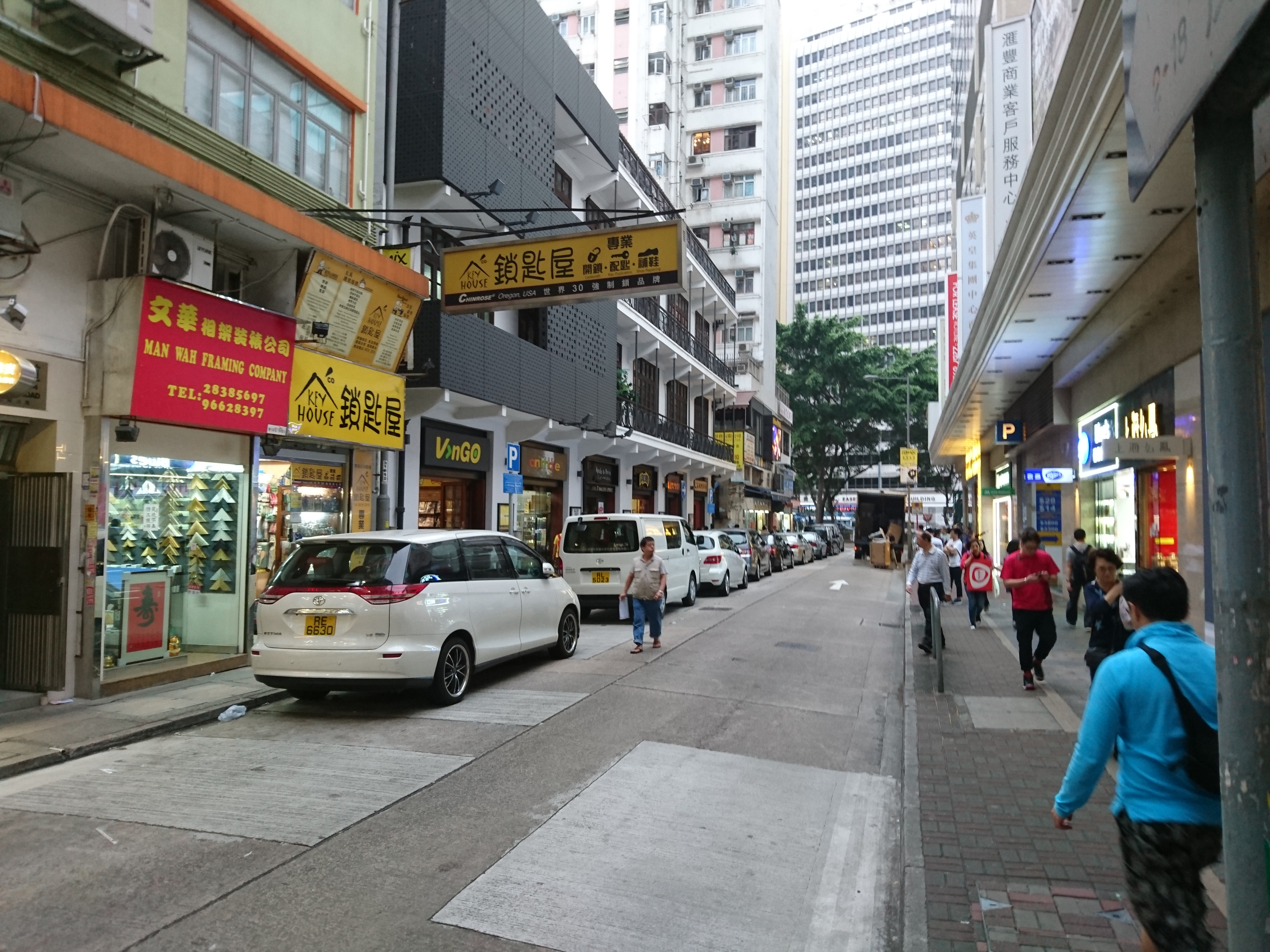
Mallory Street

Mallory Street (Chinese: 茂蘿街; Jyutping: mau6 lo4 gaai1) is a street in the Wan Chai District of Hong Kong Island, Hong Kong. It connects Johnston Road in the north to Wan Chai Road in the south. Mallory Street was originally owned by Lawrence Mallory in the 1900s and the street was named after him.

Around 1905, Hongkong Land acquired the rights to Mallory Street and Burrows Street and built 10 shophouses on the site in the mid-1910s.

In 2005, the Urban Renewal Authority invested HK$100 million to launch a pilot project to revitalise Mallory Street in Wan Chai. The project involved two rows of 10 Grade II historic pre-war buildings on Mallory Street and Burrows Street.

== Gallery ==
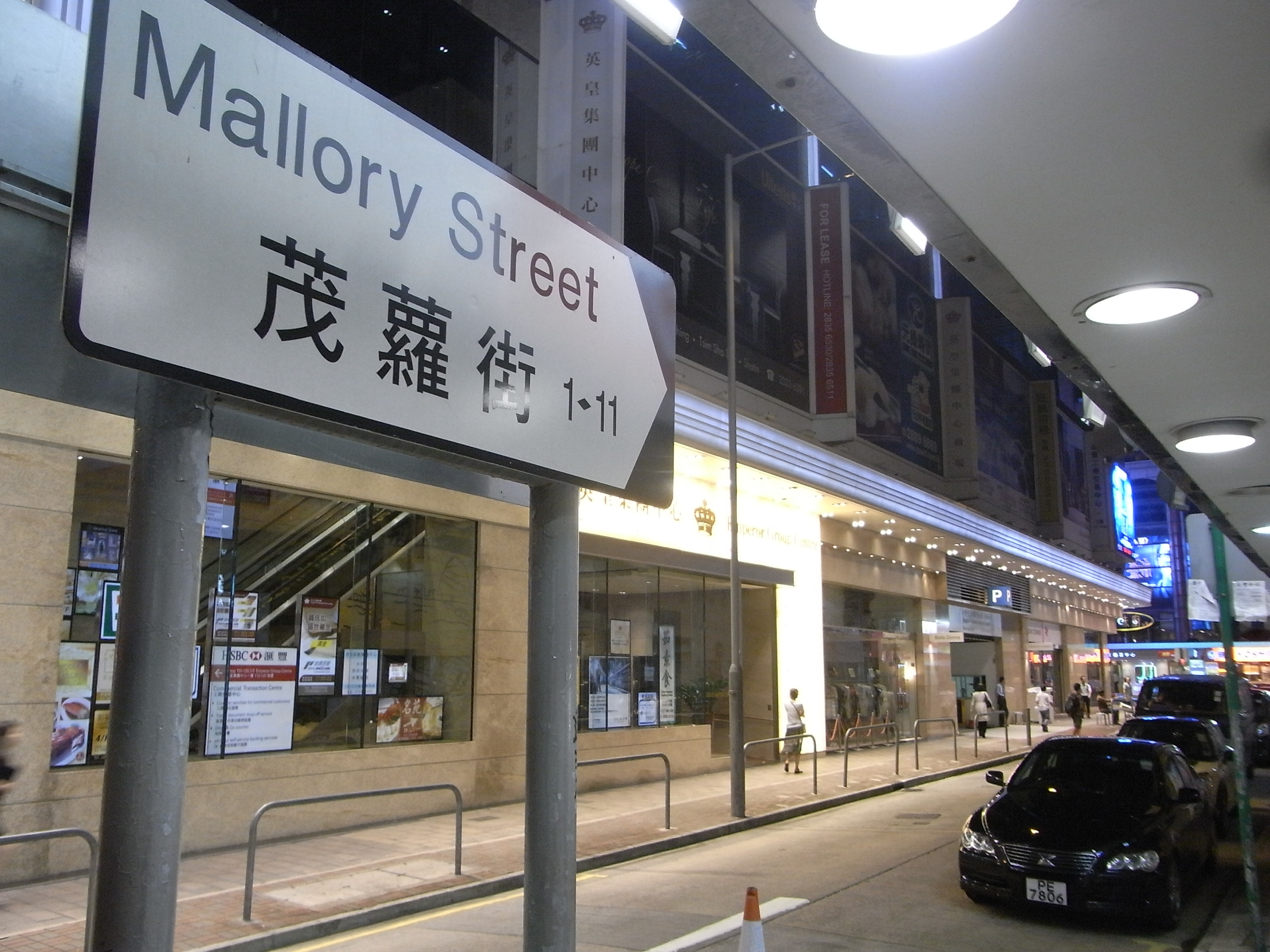
Street sign

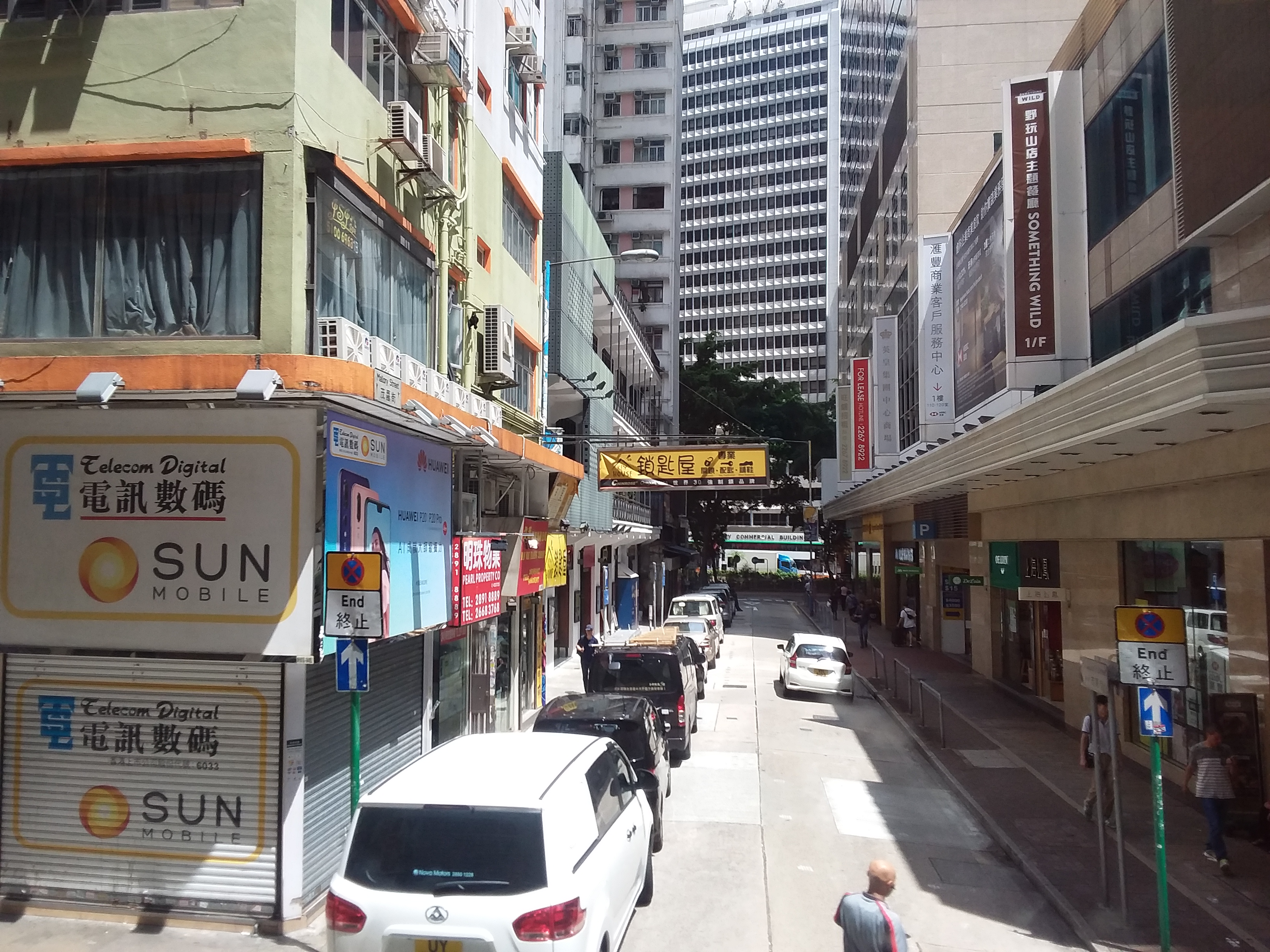
View of the street from Wan Chai Road

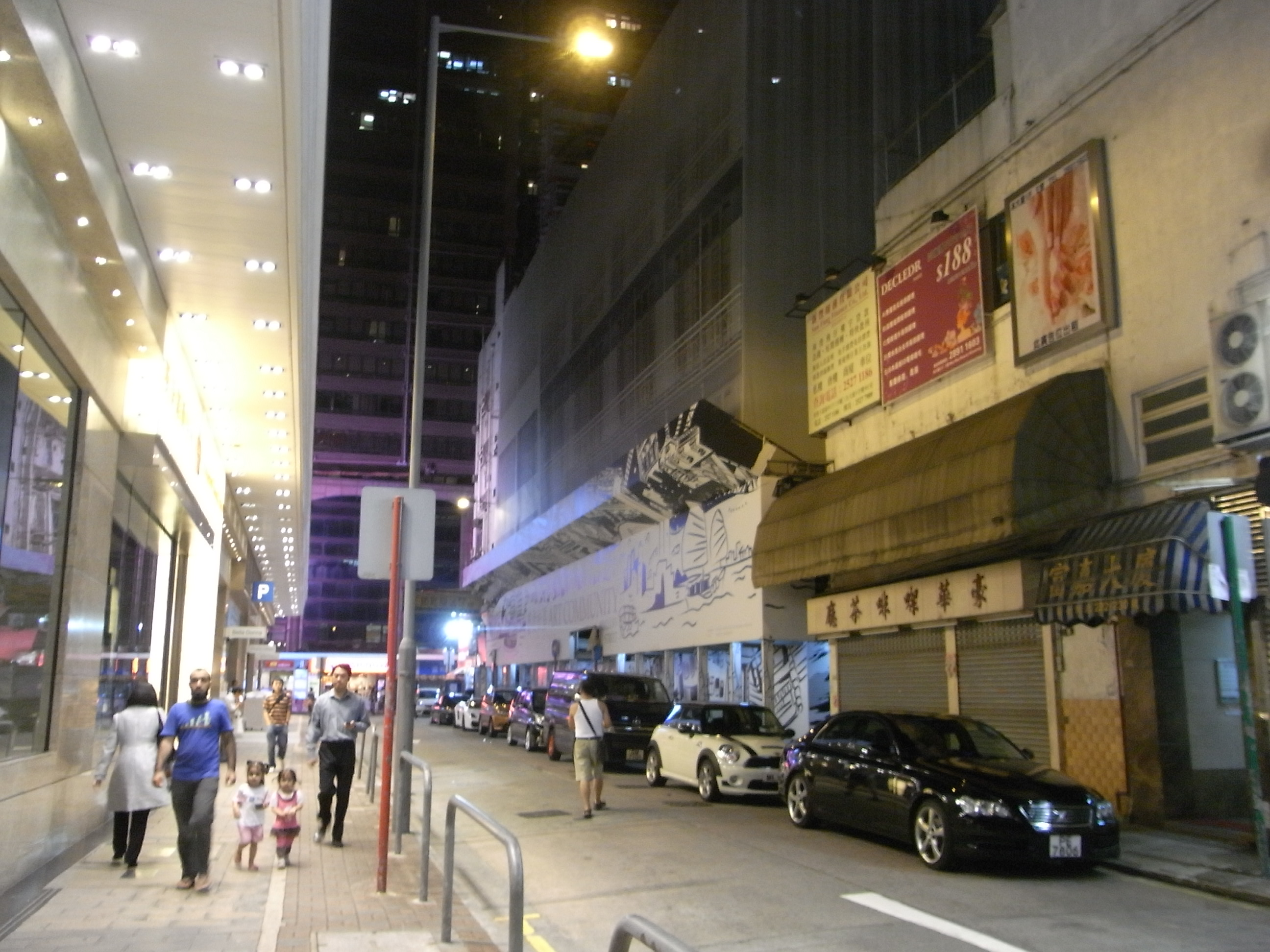
View of the street from Johnston Road

== Features ==
- 7 Mallory Street
