= Ap Lei Chau Praya Road =

Road in Ap Lei Chau, Hong Kong

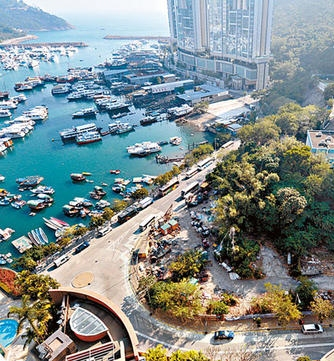
Ap Lei Chau Praya Road

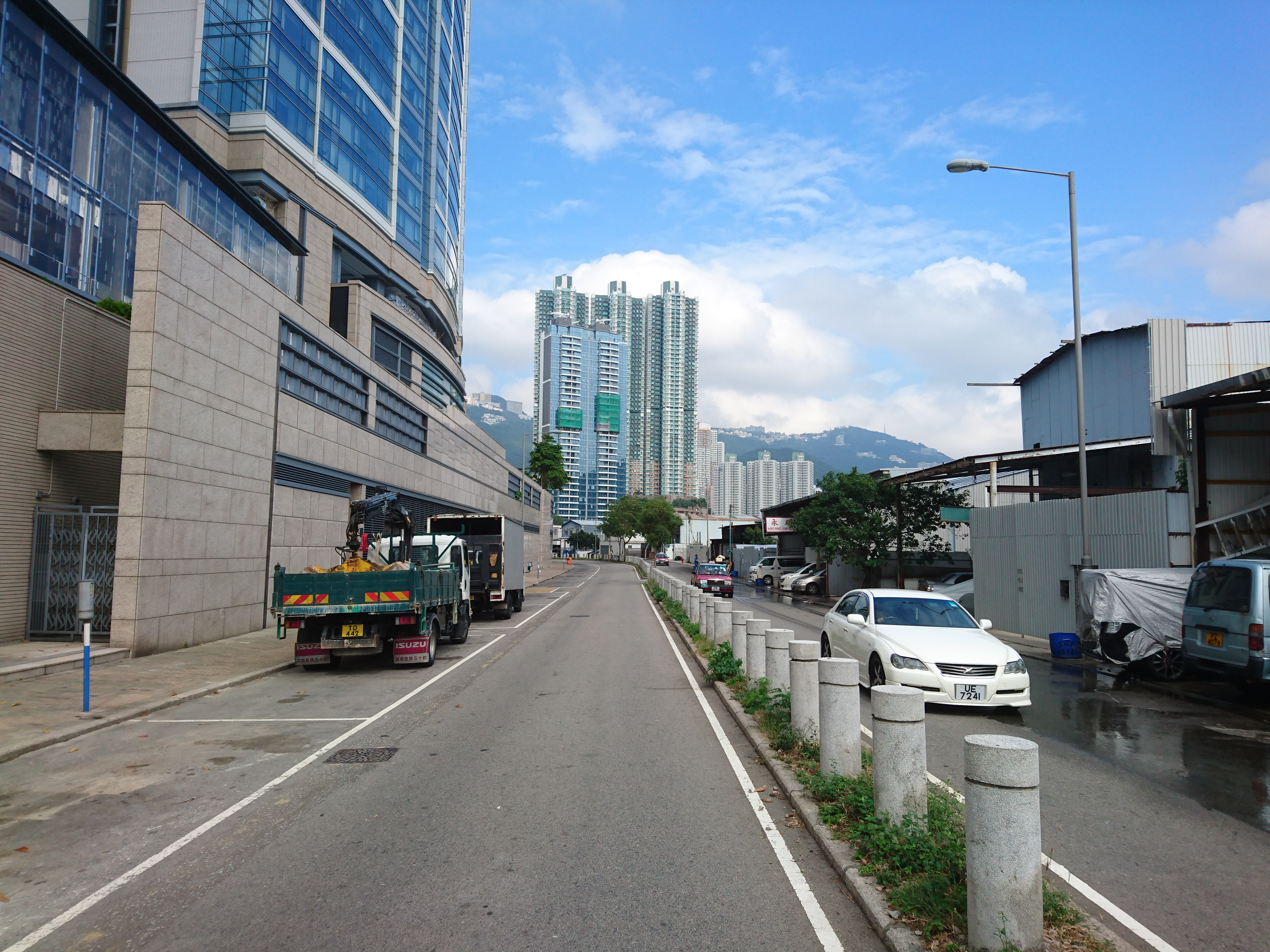
Ap Lei Chau Praya Road, near Larvotto

Ap Lei Chau Praya Road (Chinese: 鴨脷洲海旁道) is located on the east coast of Ap Lei Chau in the Southern District of Hong Kong Island, opposite Sham Wan (深灣). It starts from the Ap Lei Chau Drive (鴨脷洲徑) roundabout in the north and passes through Marina South (南區．左岸), the Southern District Shipbuilding Association Ltd. (南區造船業總會有限公司), coastal shipyard area, and ends at Larvotto (南灣).

== History ==
In 1985, because of the reclamation in the northern part of Ap Lei Chau, the government moved the affected shipyards and sawmills to the eastern part of Ap Lei Chau. There were 34 sites for shipyards and sawmills along the east coast of Ap Lei Chau and those sites have been rented by Hong Kong Government to the shipyards and sawmills owners on a quarterly basis for short-term periods, with the lease automatically renewed quarterly. The road was built to provide easy access to shipyards.

The private housing estate, Marina South, located on Ap Lei Chau Praya Road was occupied at the end of April 2011 and road improvement works began in 2010 to beautify the road and add parking meters before the residents officially moved in at the end of April 2011. In response to the increasing parking demand in the district, the number of metered parking spaces for private cars was significantly increased in 2013 and 2021 respectively, and new metered parking spaces for coaches, trucks and motorcycles were added in order to deter illegal parking.

At present, there are 16 shipyard and sawmill sites on the waterfront road opposite the housing estate, which are zoned as "industrial" areas on the "Approved Aberdeen and Ap Lei Chau Outline Zoning Plan" (香港仔及鴨脷洲分區計劃大綱核准圖). According to the Outline Map, the eastern part of Ap Lei Chau Waterfront Road has been developed into a shipyard and machinery workshop to support the development of Hong Kong's fishery industry and provide services for ship maintenance and ship safety development.
