= Tin Wan Praya Road =

Road in Hong Kong

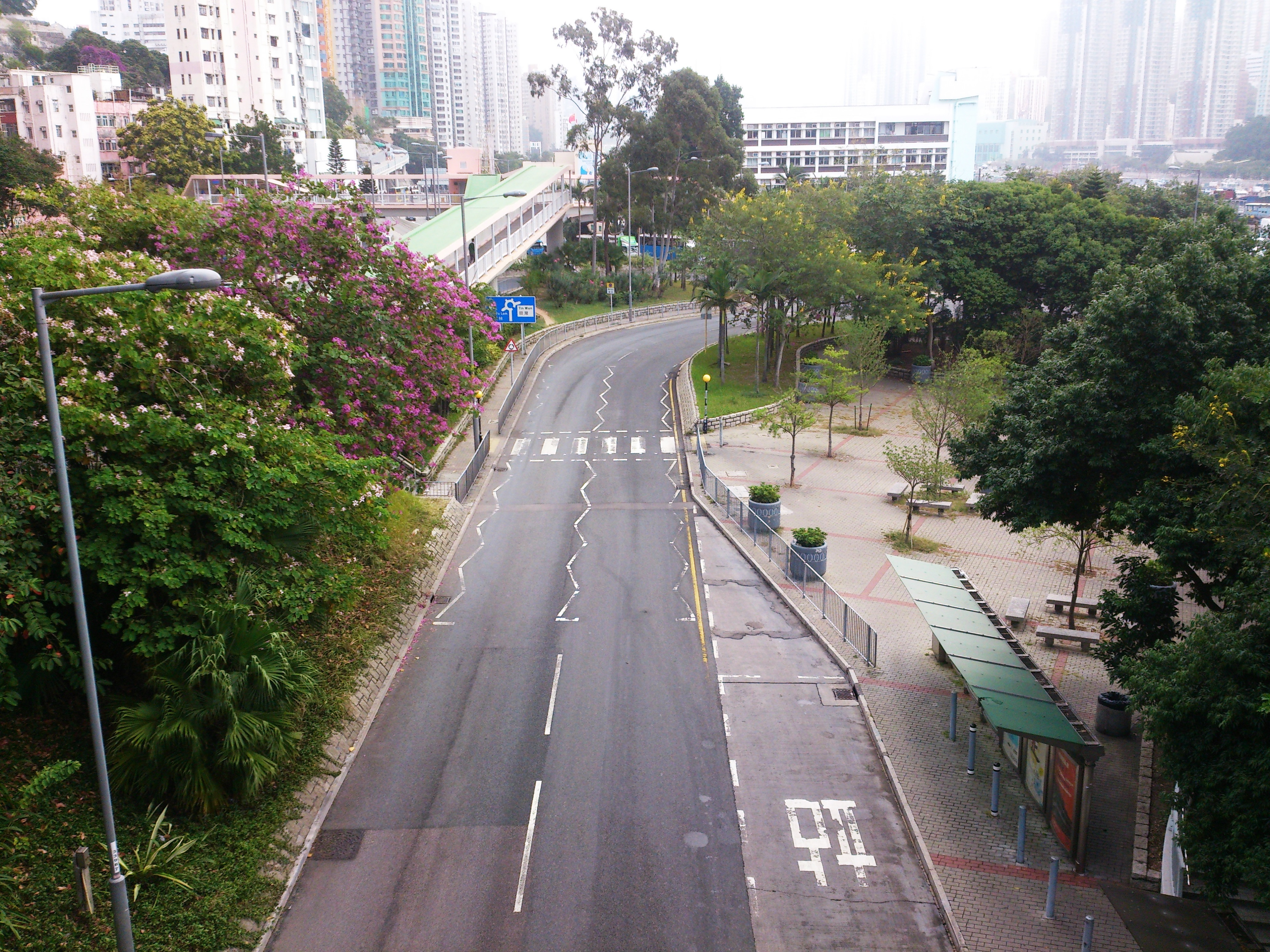
Tin Wan Praya Road

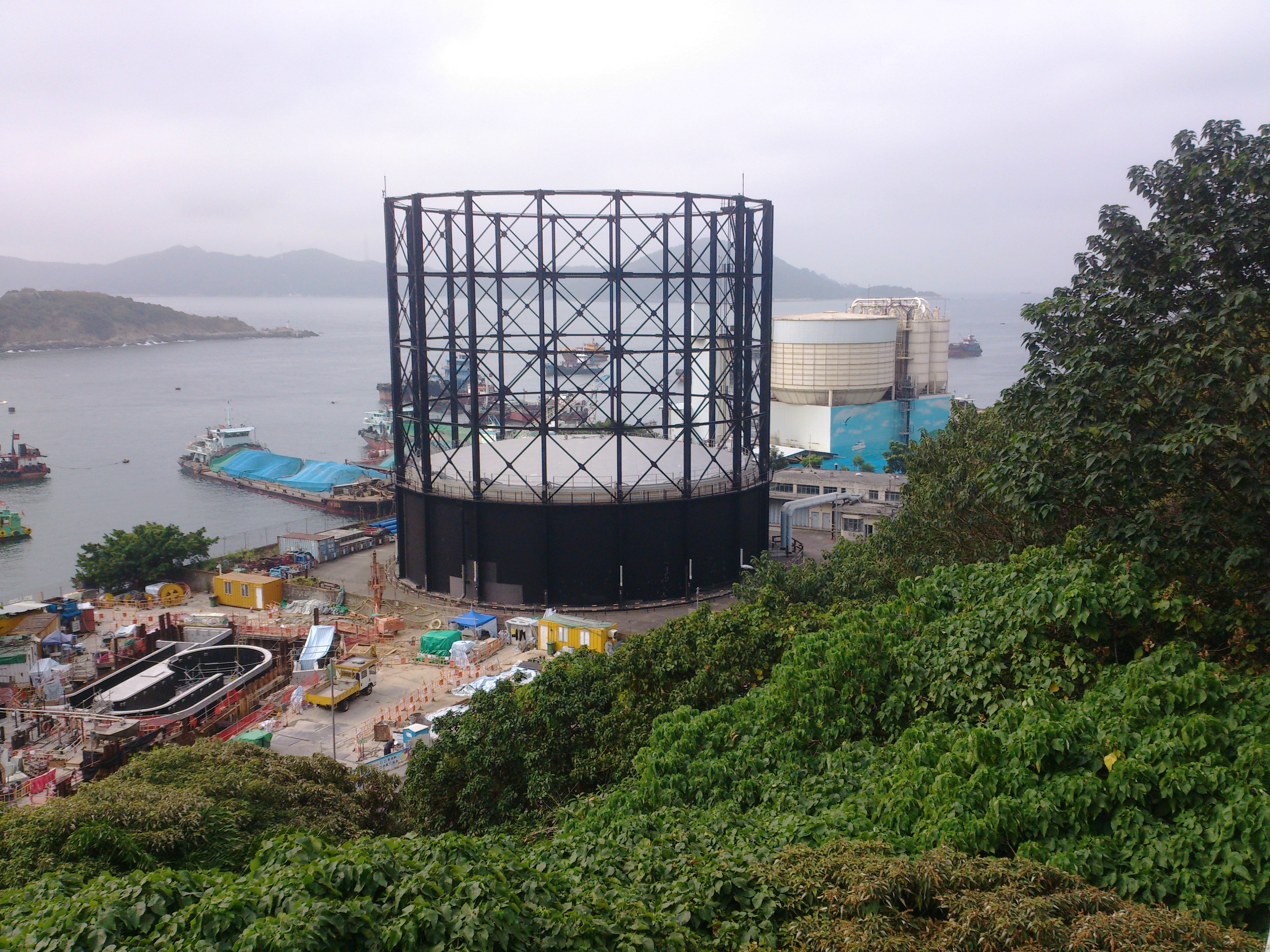
Former Cement Factory at no. 23 Tin Wan Praya Road

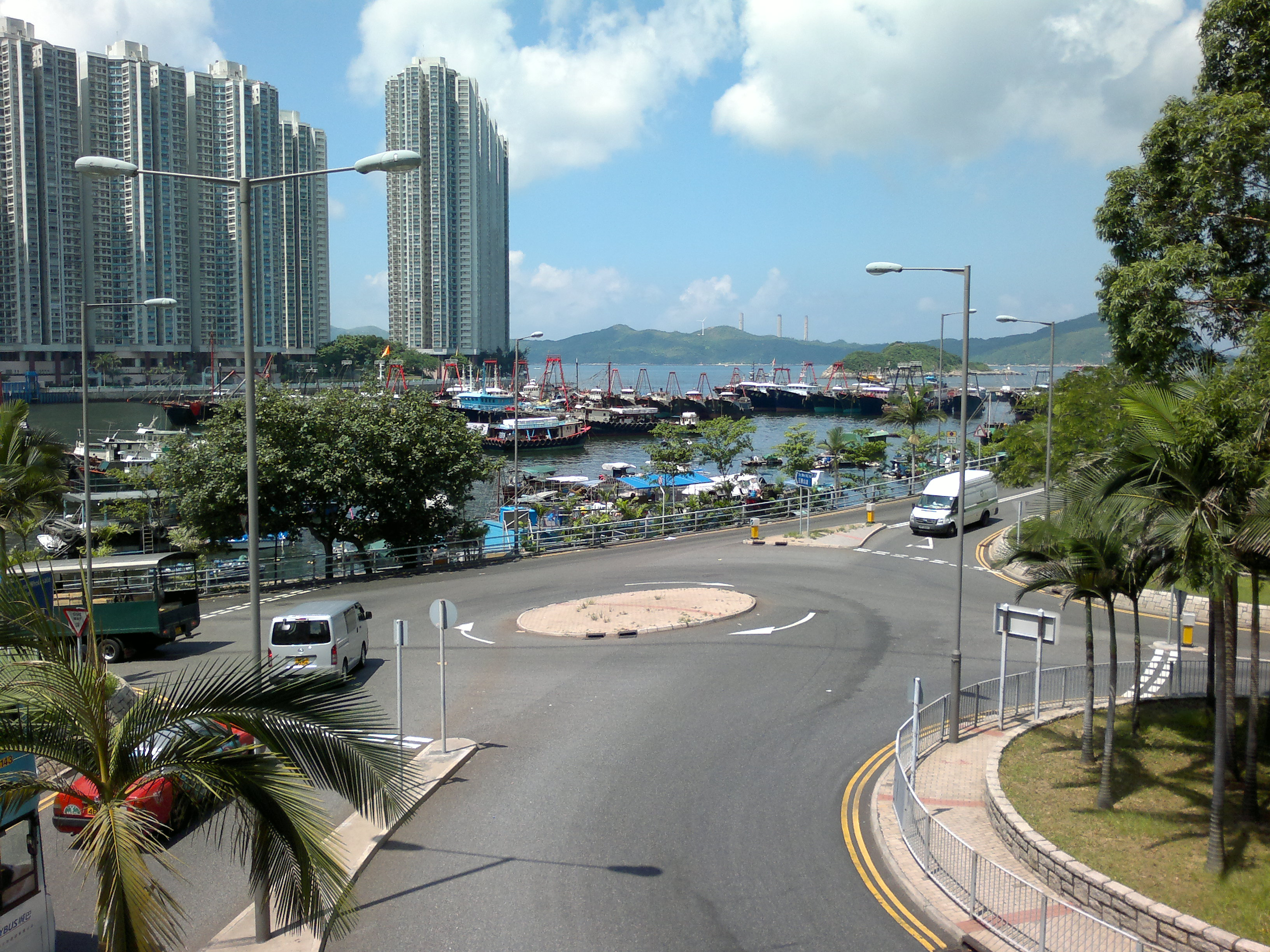
Tin Wan Praya Road Roundabout

Tin Wan Praya Road (Chinese: 田灣海旁道) is a road in the Southern District of Hong Kong Island. Although Tin Wan Praya is a seaside road similar to Kennedy Town Praya, it is surrounded by ice factories and industrial areas, so fewer people have visited it.

Tin Wan Praya Road starts from the roundabout at the junction of Tin Wan Hill Road and Fish Market Road in the east, passes by Hing Wai Centre (興偉中心), Hong Kong Ice & Cold Storage Co., Ltd. (香港製冰及冷藏有限公司), Aberdeen Preliminary Water Treatment Works (香港仔基本污水處理廠), and the intersection of Wah Kwai Road, and ends at the roundabout of Wah Kwai Estate (華貴邨) Bus Terminal in the west. It is the only way to access Wah Kwai Estate (華貴邨) and Ka Lung Court (嘉隆苑) located in Kellett Bay (雞籠灣 or 奇力灣).

== History ==
Tin Wan Praya Road was first constructed in the late 1970s to connect the Aberdeen Preliminary Water Treatment Works and the Hong Kong Ice & Cold Storage Co., Ltd. It was gazetted and named on February 15, 1980.

In conjunction with the completion of Wah Kwai Estate, Tin Wan Praya Road was extended westwards to its current location in 1987, but the extension was gazetted and formally merged into Tin Wan Praya Road on May 14, 1999.

From 1984 to 2009, number 23 Tin Wan Praya Road housed the Tin Wan concrete batching plant. The site covers an area of 3,500 square metres and the District Council wanted to use it for recreational purposes. However, the Planning Department has been retaining the site for the construction of the concrete plant on the grounds that no suitable alternative site could be found in the area to meet the needs of future infrastructure development and the construction industry on Hong Kong Island.

== Features ==
- Aberdeen Typhoon Shelters - a typhoon shelters in Aberdeen Bay built in 1960s.
