= Xiamen (disambiguation) =

Xiamen (廈門／厦門／厦门) is a city in Fujian, China.

Xiamen may also refer to:

- Xiamen Special Economic Zone, in Xiamen, Fujian, China
- Xiamen dialect, a Hokkien dialect
- Xiamen Bay, partially enclosed bay off the coast of Xiamen, China
- Xiamen (硖门), an Ethnic Township (民族乡) in Fuding City, Ningde, Fujian
- Xiamen Town (峡门镇), in Minhe County, Haidong, Qinghai

== See also ==
- Amoy (disambiguation)
