= People's Radio Hong Kong =

Programming
- Language: Cantonese

History
- First air date: June 28, 2004
- Last air date: May 23, 2007

People's Radio Hong Kong (Chinese: 香港人民廣播電台; Jyutping: hoeng1 gong2 jan4 man4 gwong2 bo3 din6 toi4) is a defunct online radio station in Hong Kong.

== Channels ==
Radio Hong Kong People's First, referred to as "people's first", created mainly to comment on current affairs and public issues, and the main program include the "Long Menzhen Storm" and "ShiuShiu Podcast" (風蕭蕭).

The second station is referred to as "People's second", mainly to discuss a small minority issues and the users produced programs, the current broadcast programs include "international free exercise", "Hong Kong people philosophy stresses", "Hong Kong way out" and "My Network Places " and so on.

== See also ==
- Media of Hong Kong
