= Amoy Street, Hong Kong =

Street in Wan Chai, Hong Kong

Coordinates: 22.27572°N 114.17196°E

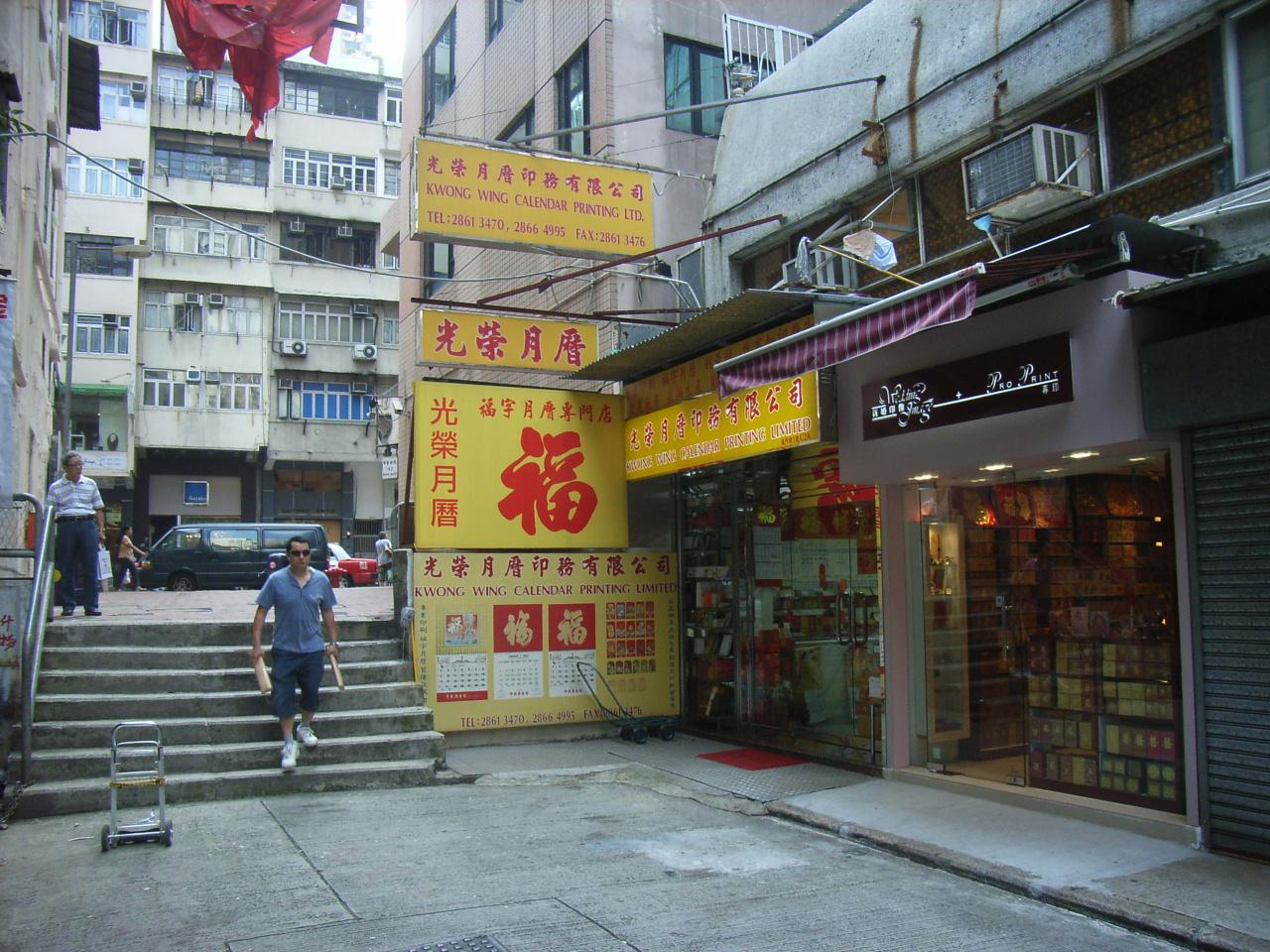
Stairs at the southern end of Amoy Street in October 2006, at its intersection with Queen's Road East.

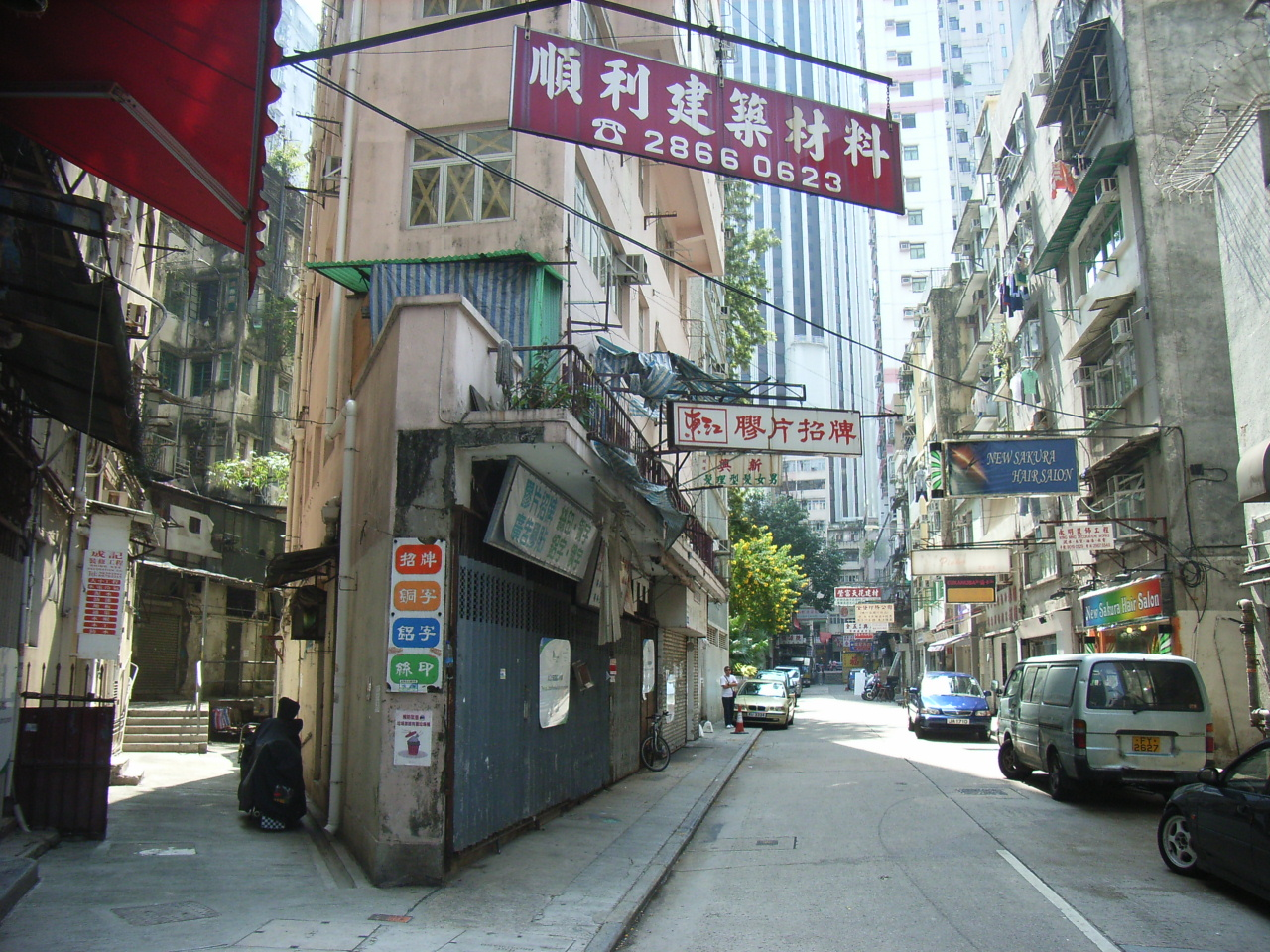
View of Amoy Street, looking south, in October 2006. The Hopewell Centre is visible in the distance. The buildings on the left have since been demolished.

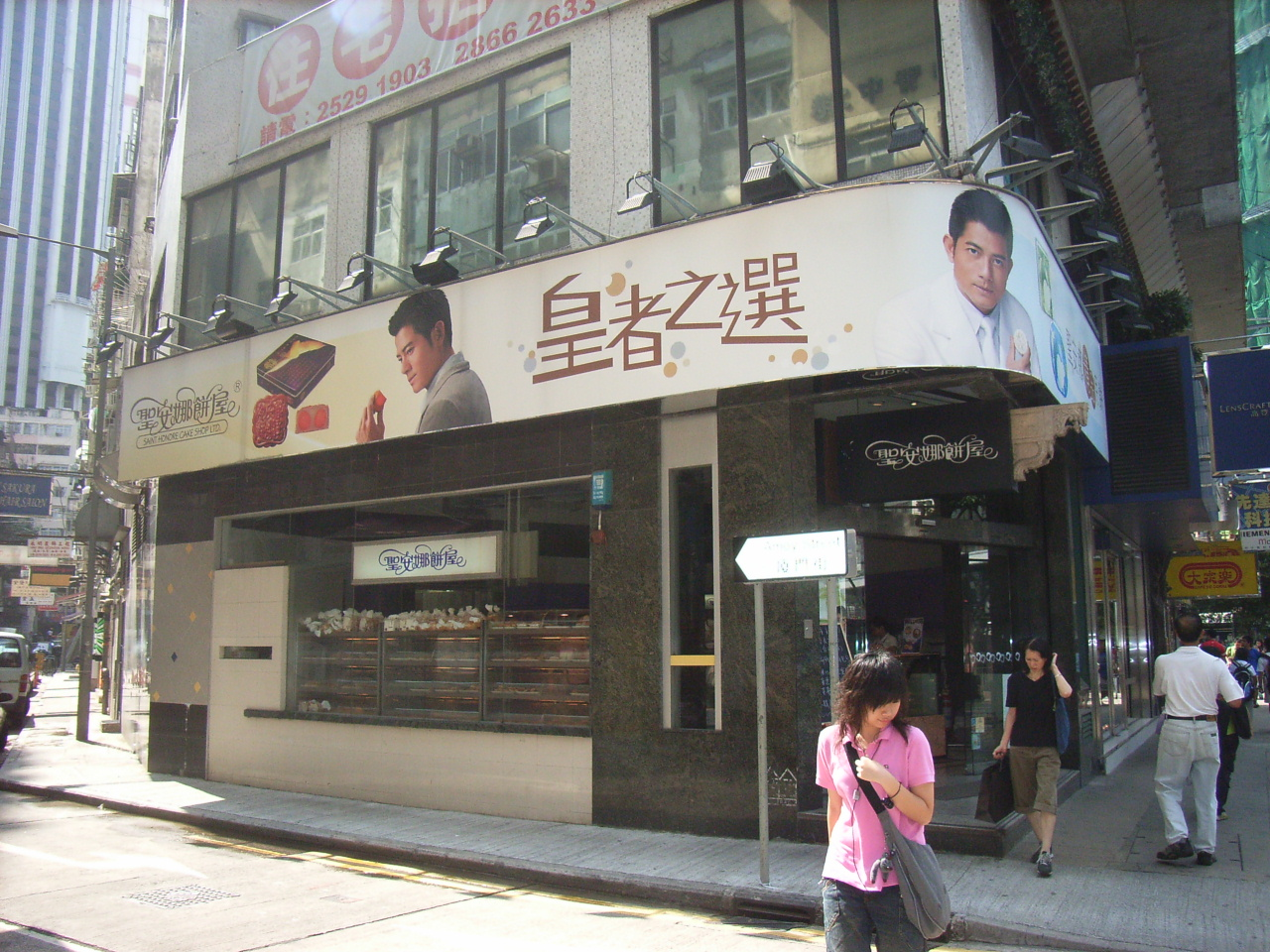
Northern end of Amoy Street in October 2006, at its intersection with Johnston Road (right).

Amoy Street (Chinese: 廈門街) is a street in the Wan Chai area of Hong Kong Island, Hong Kong. It connects Johnston Road in the north to Queen's Road East in the south. Amoy is an old name of the Chinese city of Xiamen. It has been described as "shy and retiring" by Time Out because it is a cul-de-sac with steps at one end.

== History ==
Amoy Street was opened on Marine Lot 40. Its first purchaser was MacVicar & Co. which used the lot on the former shore as a warehouse. Prior to that, there was a pier named Burn's Pier, and a sugar refinery. As part of a planned urban renewal scheme in 2008, local residents expressed concern over increased environmental noise and traffic.

== Features ==
- The shophouse at No. 6 Amoy Street was built in 1948.
- The buildings Nos. 186–190 Queen's Road East are located at the corner of Queen's Road East and Amoy Street. They are tong-laus built in the 1930s, and are now listed as Grade III historic buildings.
