= Rednaxela Terrace =

Street in Mid-Levels, Hong Kong

Coordinates: 22.281032°N 114.1491609°E

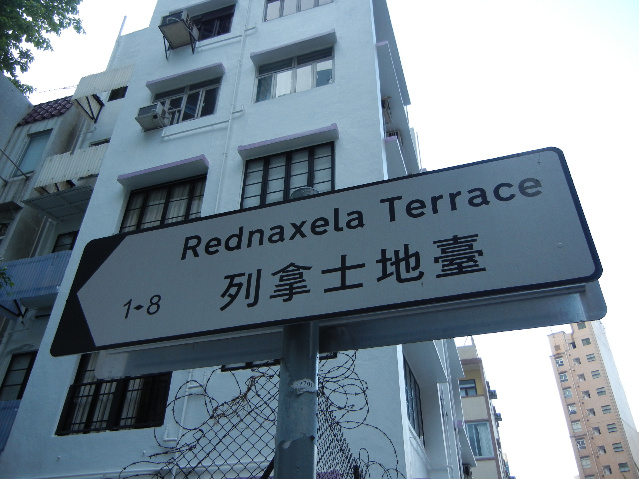
A road sign of Rednaxela Terrace

Rednaxela Terrace (Chinese: 列拿士地臺; Jyutping: lit6 naa4 si6 dei6 toi4) is a pedestrian-only street in Mid-Levels, Hong Kong.

It is 63 metres (207 ft) long and junctions Shelley Street to the west and Peel Street to the east.

== Name ==
Although there are no official conclusions to the origin of the name, it is believed that the road was part of the property owned by a Mr. Alexander, and Rednaxela is an understandable transposition of the English name Alexander, since the Chinese language was typically written right-to-left at the time. Most of the naming errors in Hong Kong are a result of incorrect transliterations. Another explanation is that the name is linked to abolitionist Robert Alexander Young, who was known to have used the name Rednaxela in his 1829 work Ethiopian Manifesto. Chinese transliteration followed suit and was adopted by the neighbourhood, and the government never made any further alterations.

== History ==
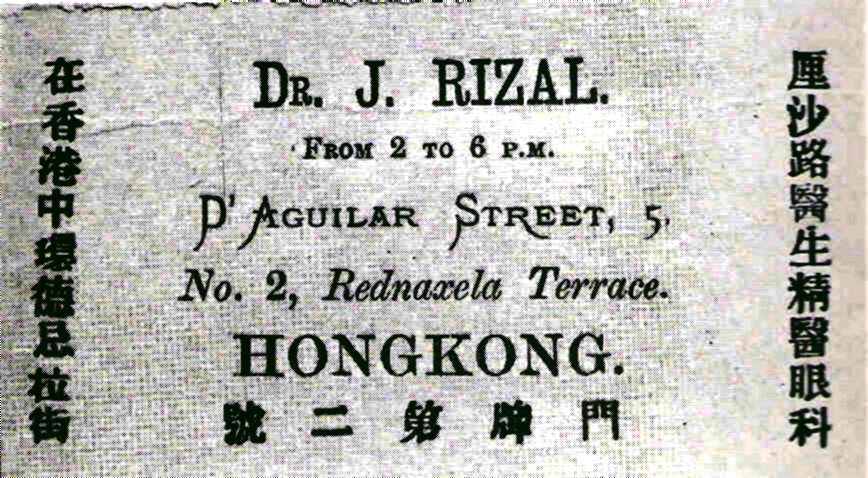
José Rizal's business card, showing his residence at No.2 Rednaxela Terrace

From December 1891 to June 1892, the Filipino revolutionary and national hero José Rizal lived with his family at Number 2, Rednaxela Terrace, then working as an eye clinician in Hong Kong. The Hong Kong government erected a commemorative plaque in 2004 on the intersection of Rednaxela Terrace and Shelley Street to honour Rizal.

== Residential buildings ==
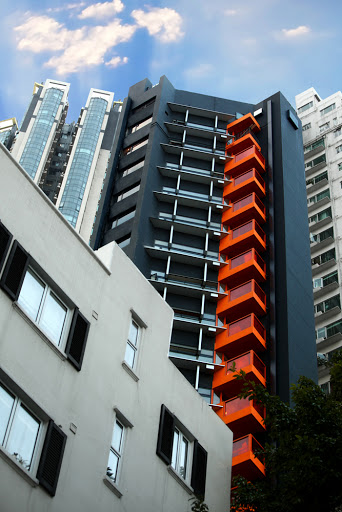
ACTS Rednaxela

Rednaxela Terrace only has a few residential buildings, with Caine Road on its north, Central-Mid-levels Escalator and Jamia Mosque on its east.

Rednaxela Terrace is considered a convenient location for local residents and expatriates. No. 1 Rednaxela Terrace is a building called The Rednaxela developed by Yu Tai Hing Company Ltd, which was completed in 1998.

No. 8 Rednaxela Terrace was developed as ACTS Rednaxela by Goldig Investment Group (Chinese: 協利集團; Jyutping: hip6 lei6 zaap6 tyun4) who bought the site in 2000 for HK$ 20 million. Carl Gouw (Chinese: 吳家耀; Jyutping: ng4 gaa1 jiu6), on of Indonesian-Chinese businessman Alex Gouw, represented the developer acted as the creative chief under ACTS. He collaborated with Gary Chang and EDGE Design Institute on designing the building. It received a Design For Asia Merit award from Hong Kong Design Centre and was featured in Apple TV's Home. Goldig Investment, sold ACTS Rednaxela in 2012 for HK$ 200 million and ACTS continued with the serviced apartments operations until 2017. The building model is exhibited at M+ museum of West Kowloon Cultural District.
