= Blue House (Hong Kong) =

Tenement block in Hong Kong

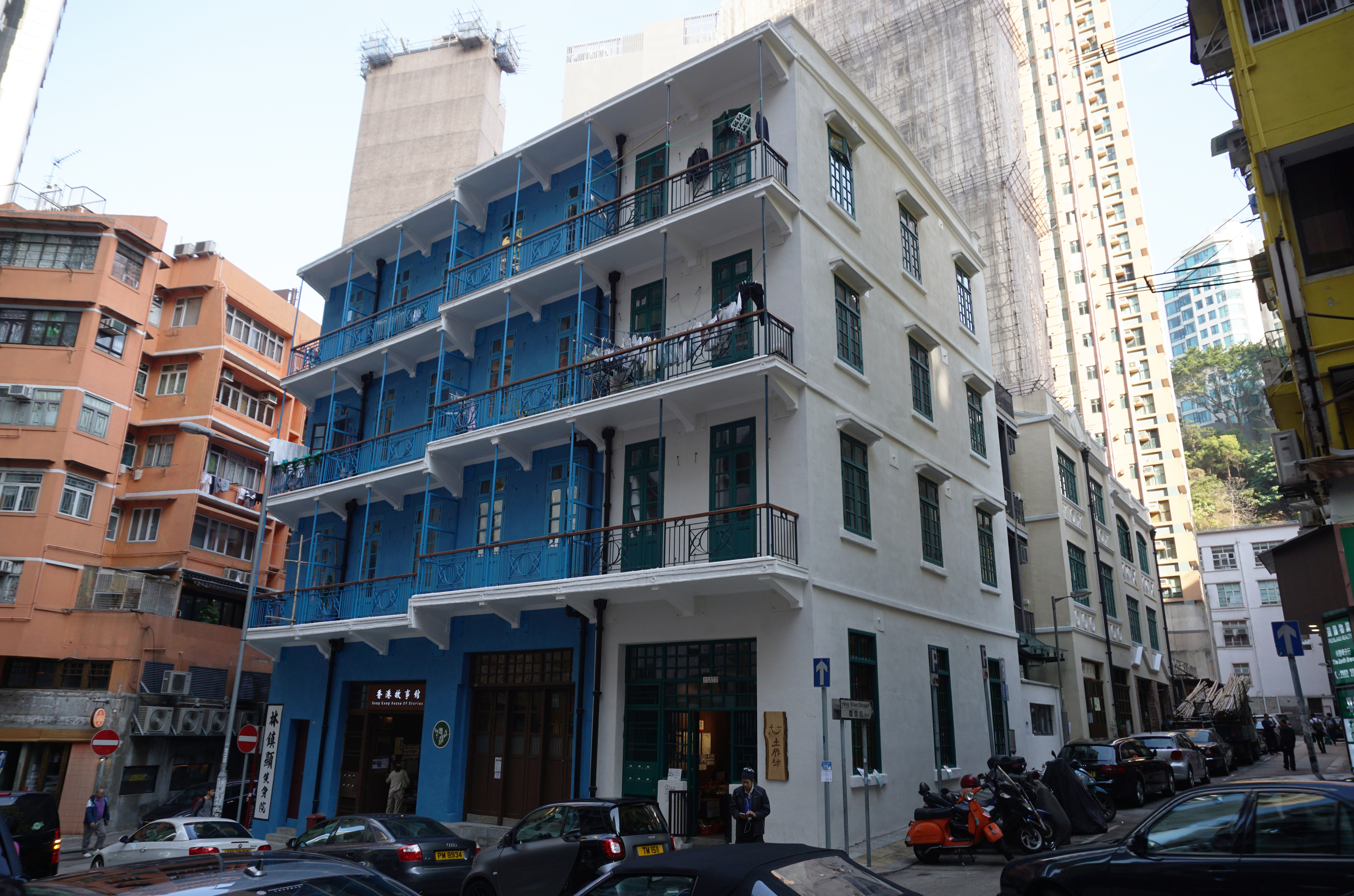
- Blue House in 2018

- Location within Hong Kong

General information
- Architectural style: Tong lau
- Classification: Grade I historic building
- Location: Wan Chai, 72-74A Stone Nullah Lane, Hong Kong
- Coordinates: 22.273897°N 114.174146°E
- Named for: Blue outer walls
- Construction started: 1920
- Completed: 1922

Technical details
- Floor count: 4

Blue House
- Traditional Chinese: 藍屋
- Simplified Chinese: 蓝屋
Transcriptions
Standard Mandarin
- Hanyu Pinyin: Lán Wū
Yue: Cantonese
- Yale Romanization: Làahm ūk
- Jyutping: Laam4 uk1

The Blue House is a 4-storey balcony-type tenement block located at 72-74A Stone Nullah Lane, Wan Chai, Hong Kong. It is named after the blue colour painted on its external walls. It is one of the few remaining examples of tong lau of the balcony type in Hong Kong and is listed as a Grade I historic building.

== Historic background ==
The house was the original site of the second hospital 'Wah To Hospital' (aka "Wan Chai Kai Fong Hospital"), which was built in the 1870s in Wan Chai. The hospital, which provided Chinese medical services to local Chinese, was possibly the first hospital in the district.

After the hospital closed in 1886, the two-storey building was then used as a temple for Wah To, the revered Chinese physician from the Three Kingdoms period.

The building was demolished in 1920 and was built into four four-storey tenement blocks in 1922. After the Japanese occupation of Hong Kong in 1945. The building was subsequently used as a martial arts school and Dit Da clinic by Lam Cho, the adopted nephew of Lam Sai-wing.

The building was acquired by the government in the 1970s, and in 1990 the outer walls were painted blue, thus earning it the name Blue House.

== Future revitalisation ==
All the upper floors of Blue House, apart from 72 Stone Nullah Lane, are timber structures. The two wooden stairs, with original elements intact, are well maintained.

The building was part of a HK$100 million plan, unveiled by the Housing Society and the Urban Renewal Authority, to preserve nine Chinese-style buildings in Wan Chai that were constructed during the 1920s.

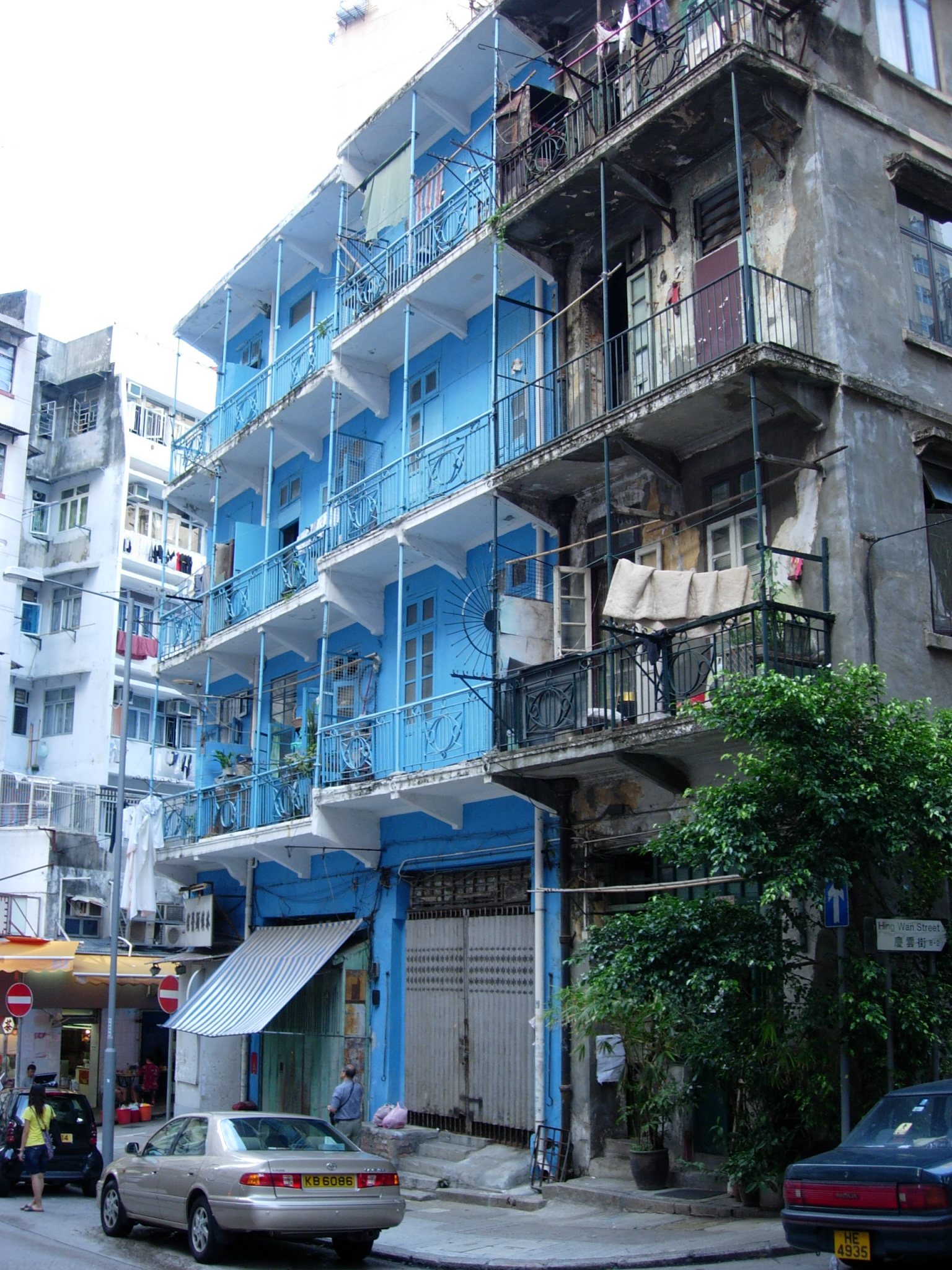
Blue House in 2006

The building has been preserved and revitalised in a traditional tea and medicine style.

In 2007, the Urban Renewal Authority and the Development Bureau jointly announced that the residents of the Blue House, were to be allowed to stay in this historic monument. On the same year, one of the ground floor's shophouses of the building was occupied as a location of the Wan Chai Livelihood Place, which was later renamed as the Hong Kong House of Stories in March 2012. The building closed for renovation in 2015.

The building was fully renovated and opened in 2016. It won the 2017/2018 architectural prize in 2018.

== Neighbourhood ==
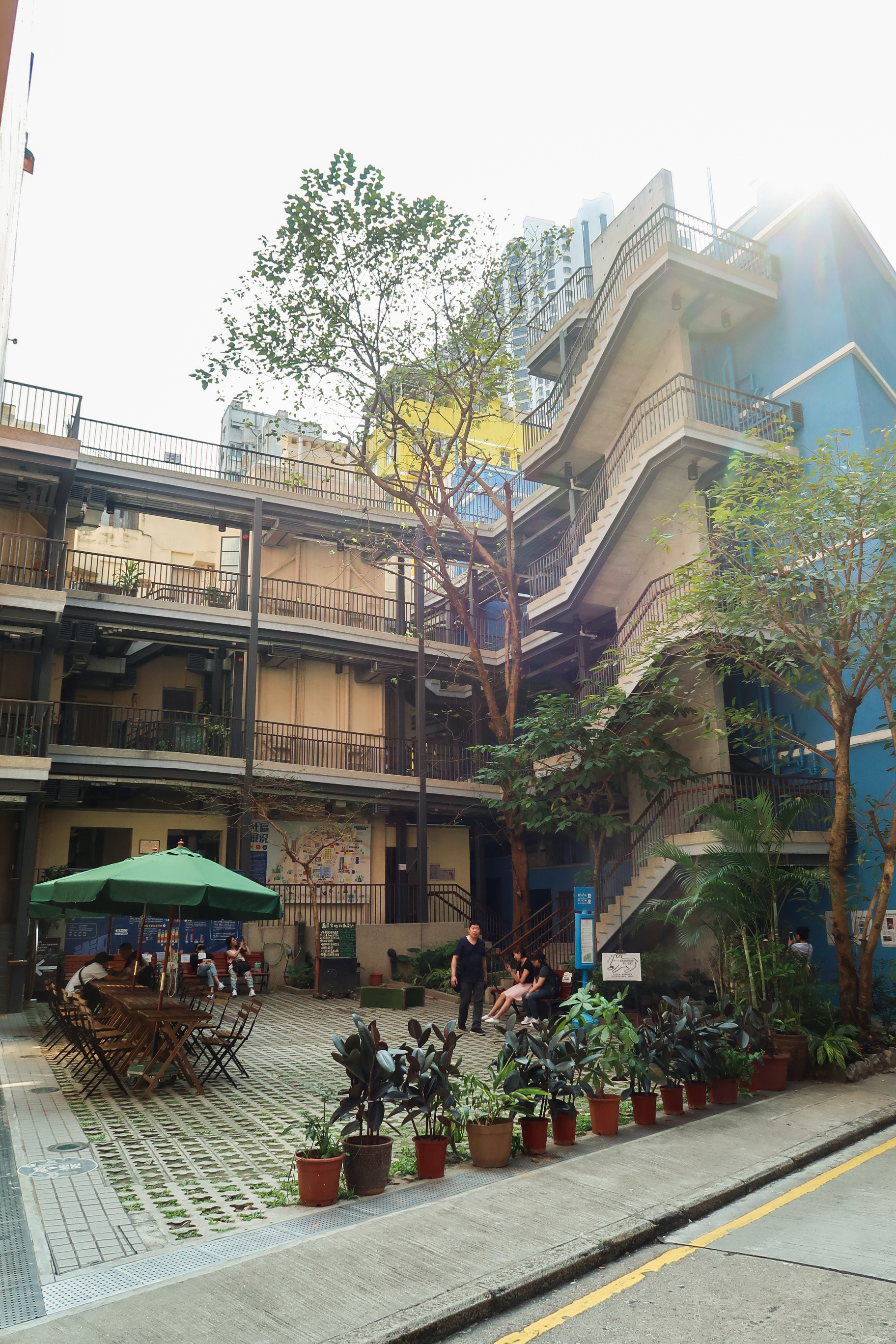
New Courtyard after the revitalisation of the Blue House in 2019

The building is located on the corner of Stone Nullah Lane, King Sing Street and Hing Wan Street. Stone Nullah Street connects to Queen's Road East facing Old Wan Chai Market Building. 85 Stone Nullah Lane is the headquarters and community centre of St James Settlement (Hong Kong).

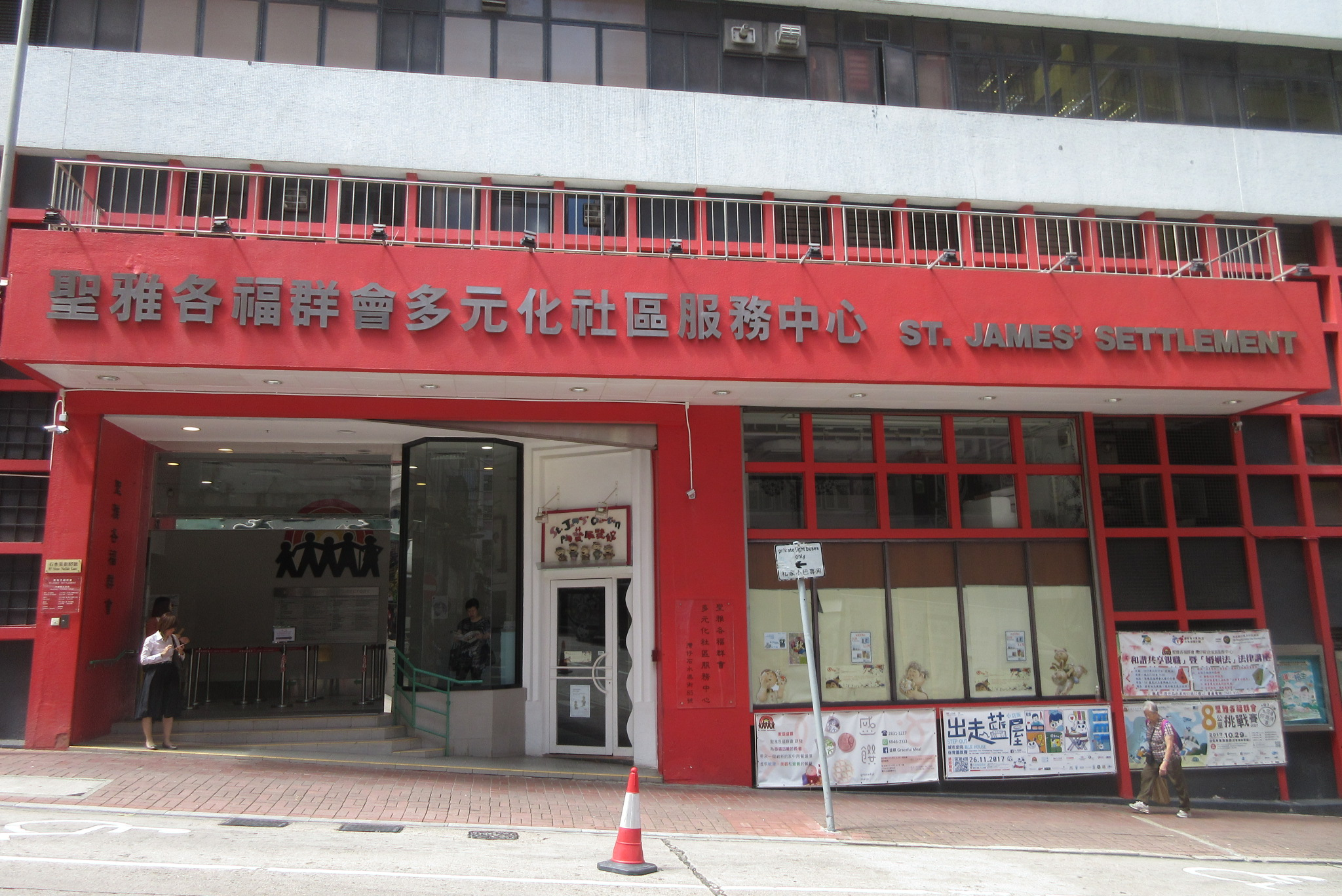
Front entrance of the nearby St James Settlement elderly community centre

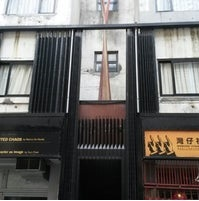
Wan Chai Visual Archive, a non-profit art space within the Blue House

A non-profit community art space called Wan Chai Visual Archive was located in a tenement building at 5-9 Hing Wan Street. It was initiated by the building's owner Goldig Investment Group (協利集團) and Hong Kong Polytechnic University. Carl Gouw (吳家耀), representing the owner was its director. Its curator was Alvin Yip, director of the Jockey Club Design Institute for Social Innovation of Hong Kong Polytechnic University, and received the Ten Outstanding Young Persons Award in 2011. Carl Gouw and Alvin Yip were both directors of non-profit Hong Kong Ambassadors of Design (now known as Design Trust) .

Wan Chai Visual Archive was opened in 2012 to the public, with an opening ceremony attended by Bernard Chan, Chairman of Antiquities Advisory Board, Salina Yan, Deputy Secretary for Home Affairs Department and the CEO of the St James Settlement's. It held exhibitions and events attended by government officials, consulate generals, entertainment celebrities, local, international artists and students. It encouraged the engagements of public and business sectors, non-profit organizations and the neighborhood in the process of cultural and heritage preservation.

The project is mentioned in the book "Urbanizing Carescapes of Hong Kong" by Taiwanese academic Shu-mei Huang who wrote 'By breaking their exercises of redevelopment into different components and phases, the operation could accumulate cultural capital for their future projects'.

Goldig Investment, owned by Indonesian-Chinese tycoon Alex Gouw, intended to rebuild the building with adjourning lots as a boutique hotel under the ACTS brand while the original building was used as serviced apartments and cultural education. By having initial building plans approved and engaging British architects Amada Levete, the firm designing the Central Yards, the hotel plan was scrapped due to adjouning owners rejecting Goldig's proposals to purchase additional lots. Goldig Investment then sold 5-7 Hing Wan Street to Nam Fung Group in 2012 at HK$ 146 million, making a gross profit of HK$ 81 million in only 2.5 years, while retaining management rights to operate as serviced apartments named The Archive until 2019.

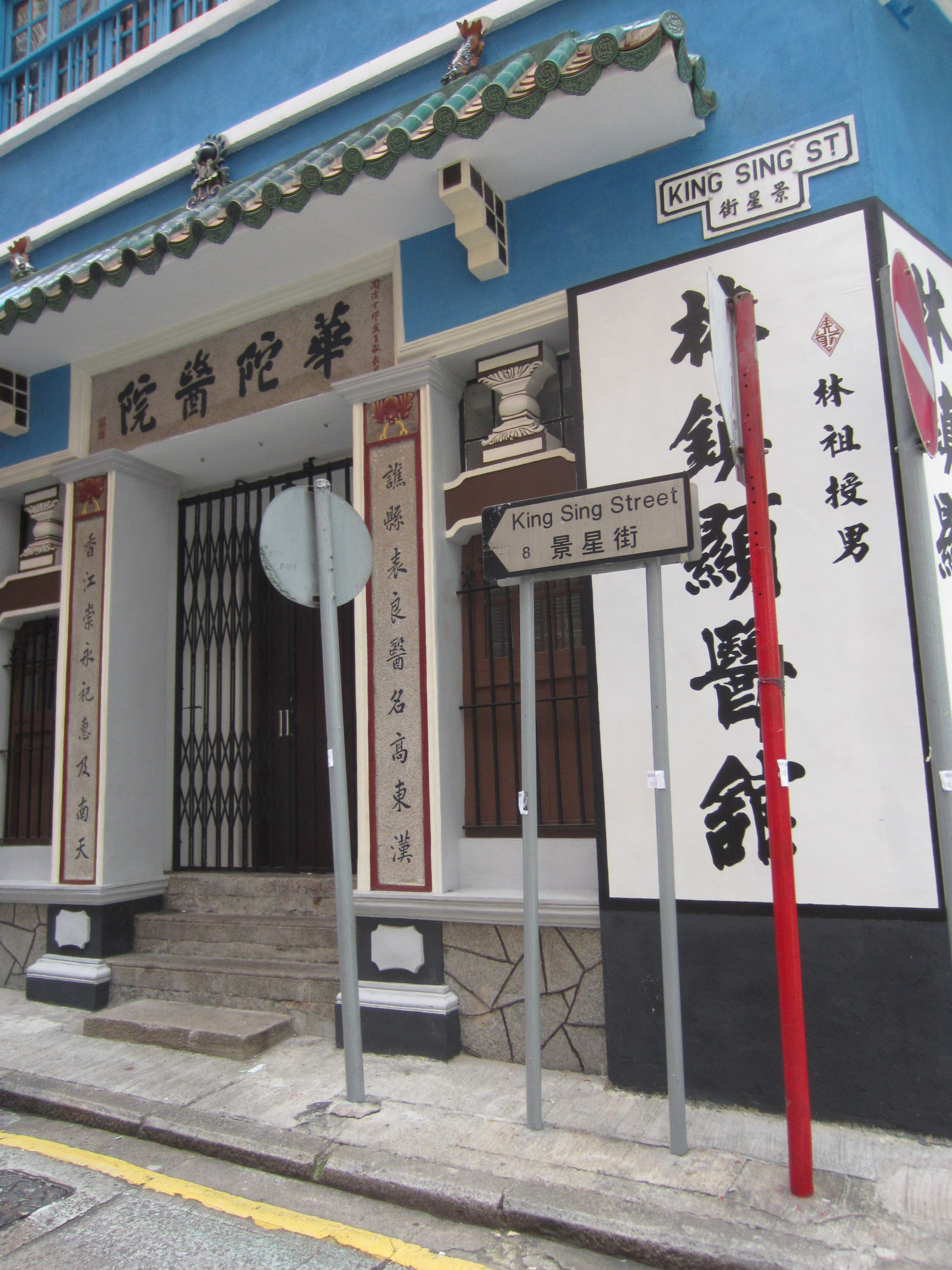
The fully renovated Dit Da Clinic at the Blue House in 2017

== See also ==
- Green House (Hong Kong)
- Revitalising Historic Buildings Through Partnership Scheme
- Wan Chai Heritage Trail
