= Albert Cleage =

American writer and activist (1911–2000)

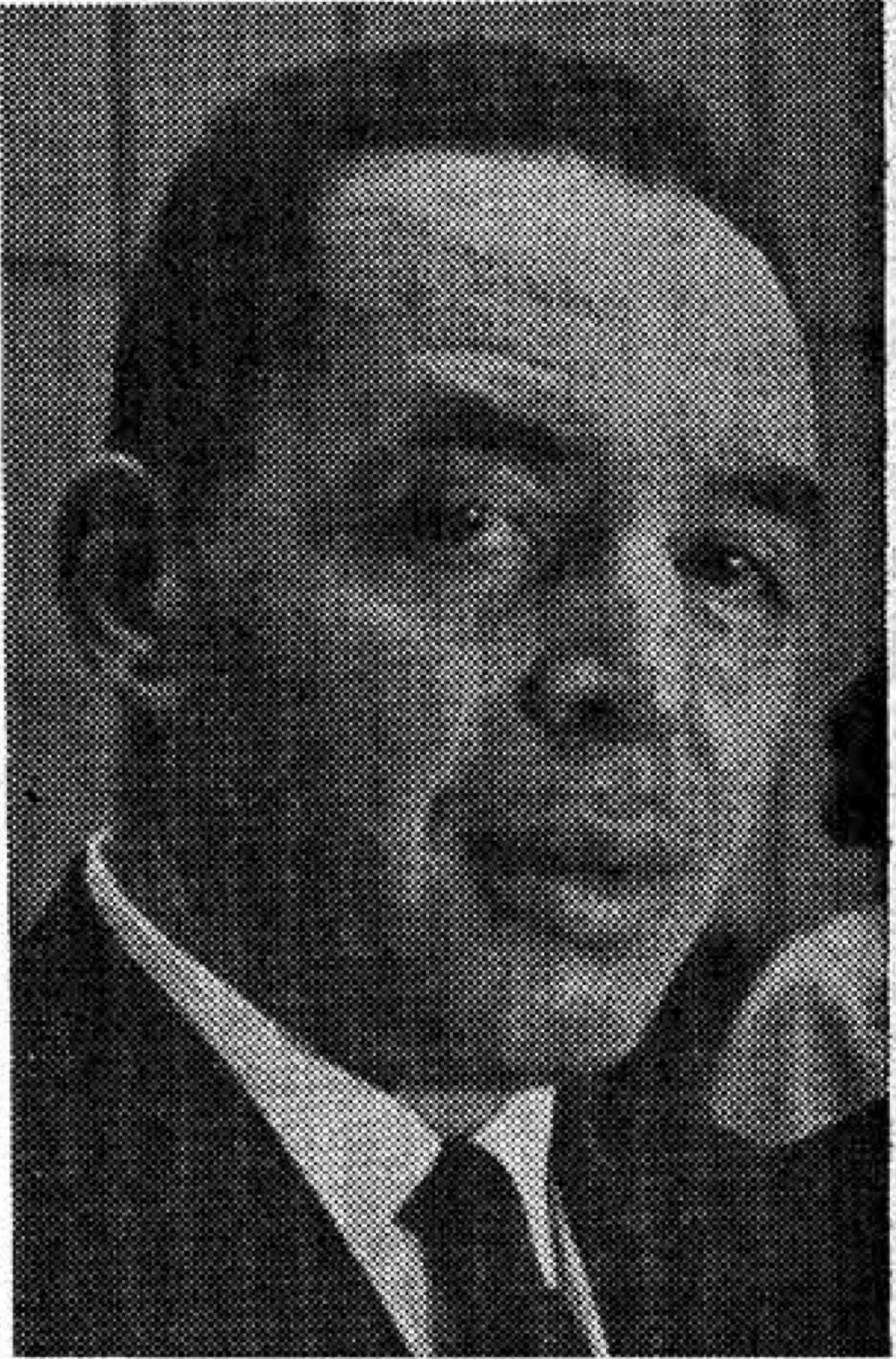
Albert Cleage

Albert B. Cleage Jr. (June 1911 – February 20, 2000) was a Black nationalist Christian minister, political candidate, newspaper publisher, political organizer, and author. He founded the prominent Shrine of the Black Madonna Church, as well as the Shrine Cultural Centers and Bookstores in Detroit, Atlanta, and Houston. All locations are still open and functioning under the BCN mission.

Cleage, who changed his name to Jaramogi Abebe Agyeman in the early 1970s, played an important role in the Civil Rights Movement in Detroit during the 1960s and 1970s. He became increasingly involved with Black nationalism and Black separatism during the 1970s, rejecting many of the core principles of racial integration.

== Early life ==
Albert B. Cleage Jr. was born in 1911 in Indianapolis, the first of seven children. During much of his later life, his light skin color would become a common feature of discussion. His first biographer, Detroit News reporter Hiley Ward, said it left him with a lifelong identity crisis. Grace Lee Boggs later described Cleage as "pink-complexioned, with blue eyes, and light brown, almost blond hair."

His father graduated from Indiana School of Medicine in 1910 and moved to Kalamazoo, Michigan to practice before taking a position in Detroit. Dr. Cleage helped found Dunbar Hospital, Detroit's only hospital that granted admitting privileges to Black doctors and trained African-American residents. Dr. Cleage was a major figure in the Detroit medical community, even being designated as city physician by Mayor Charles Bowles in 1930.

Upon graduation from Detroit's Northwestern High School, Albert Cleage had a peripatetic post-secondary education. He attended Wayne State University beginning in 1929, finally graduating in 1942 with his BA in sociology, but he also studied at Fisk University under sociologist Charles S. Johnson. He worked as a social worker for the Detroit Department of Health before commencing seminary studies at Oberlin College in 1938, finally earning his Bachelor of Divinity from Oberlin Graduate School of Theology in 1943.

Cleage married Doris Graham in 1943, and was ordained in the Congregational Christian Churches during the same year. He had two daughters and later divorced Graham in 1955.

Cleage's final encounter with formal education was at the University of Southern California's film school in the 1950s. He was interested in creating religious films, but withdrew after a semester to take a position in a San Francisco congregation.

== Religious leadership ==
Following ordination, Cleage began a pastorate with Chandler Memorial Congregational Church in Lexington, Kentucky. In 1944, he became the pastor in an integrated church in San Francisco, the Church of the Fellowship of All Peoples, but that did not work out for long. In 1946, he became the pastor of St. John's Congregational Church in Springfield, Massachusetts. He served there until he returned to Detroit in 1951. Upon returning, he served at an integrated church, St. Mark's Community Church (United Presbyterian Church of North America) mission. However, some of the white leaders of the church disagreed with the way Cleage was leading his Black congregation.

In 1953, Cleage and a group of followers left the church and formed the Central Congregational Church, which in the mid-1960s was renamed Central United Church of Christ. Their mission was to minister to the less fortunate, and they offered many programs for the poor, political leadership, and education.

He resisted the inclusion of whites in the massive Walk to Freedom on June 23, 1963, in Detroit; this was the last time he participated with white liberals as he moved away from the integrationist model of leadership of the Rev. Martin Luther King Jr. and toward the Black separatism/nationalism of Malcolm X. In 1964, he helped found a Michigan branch of the Freedom Now Party, and ran for governor of Michigan as a candidate in a "Black slate" of candidates.

He was the editor of a church-published weekly tabloid newspaper called the Illustrated News that was widely circulated throughout African-American neighborhoods in Detroit during the 1960s. From its founding, he worked with the New Detroit Committee founded by Joseph L. Hudson Jr., an organization formed during the 1967 Detroit riot designed to heal racial and economic divisions in the city that were exposed by the civil disorder. Cleage later renounced his participation and returned a grant of $100,000 to the organization.

In 1967, he began the Black Christian National Movement, which encouraged Black churches to reinterpret Jesus's teachings to suit the social, economic, and political needs of Black people. In March 1967, Cleage installed a painting of a Black Madonna holding the baby Jesus in his church. and renamed the church the Shrine of the Black Madonna.

In 1970, the Shrine of the Black Madonna was renamed Pan African Orthodox Christian Church, the Black Christian nationalist movement. More shrines were made in Kalamazoo, Atlanta and Houston. The mission of the shrines was, and is, to bring the Black community back to a more conscious understanding of their African history, in order to effect positive progression as a whole.

Cleage then changed his name to Jaramogi Abebe Agyeman, meaning "liberator, holy man, savior of the nation" in Swahili. He did not believe that integration was a panacea for black people. As a nationalist, he argued that it was critical for them to establish an economic, political, and social environment of their own. He founded the city-wide Citizens Action Committee to help with Black business. He promoted the education of Black children by Black teachers.

Cleage founded a church-owned farm, Beulah Land, in Calhoun Falls, South Carolina, and spent most of his last years there.

He died on February 20, 2000, at 88 while visiting Beulah Land.

== Personal life ==
He was the father of daughters Kristin Cleage and writer Pearl Cleage.

== Writings ==
Cleage's book The Black Messiah, which depicted Jesus as a revolutionary leader, was published in 1968. He thought it was important to change the idea of a "white" Jesus to a "Black" Jesus to help the African-American population and establish the truth behind Jesus' racial identity. It may have been based on the book Ethiopian Manifesto by Robert Young.

Cleage's second book, published in 1972, Black Christian Nationalism, focused on the idea that Jesus was Black and that he was to save the Black population. Cleage stated that if Blacks believed this, they would be able to correct their economic and political issues. He wrote that it was the Black population as a whole that mattered, not the individual, as Christianity taught. He wanted to save Black people as a whole. The book introduced the Black Christian Nationalist Movement as its own denomination.

== Selected bibliography ==
- "The Death of Fear. "Focus on Detroit" edition. November 1967. Vol. 17, No. 1. Johnson Publishing Company.
- The Black Messiah . New York: Sheed and Ward, 1968. (Reprint: Africa World Press, 1989.)
- Myths about Malcolm X: Two Views (with George Breitman). University of California: Merit Publishers, 1968.
- Black Christian Nationalism: New Directions for the Black Church New York: W. Morrow, 1972
