= Hong Kong House of Stories =

- 香港故事館
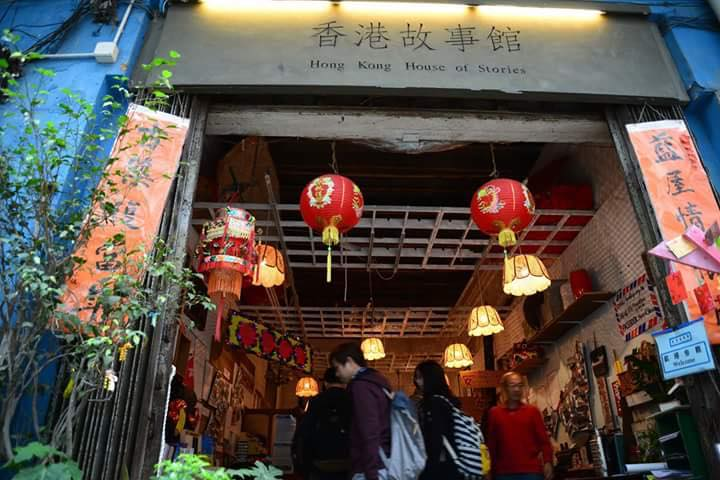
- The exterior of Hong Kong House of Stories

- Location within Hong Kong
- Former name: Wan Chai Livelihood Place (灣仔民間生活館)
- Established: 2007
- Location: Blue House, Stone Nullah Lane, Wan Chai, Hong Kong
- Coordinates: 22.273897°N 114.174146°E
- Type: history museum
- Website: vivabluehouse.hk

Hong Kong House of Stories (香港故事館), formerly Wan Chai Livelihood Place (灣仔民間生活館), is a museum of Hong Kong Culture and society.

The museum is located in the Blue House in Wan Chai, Hong Kong. The museum provides Kong stories with movies, concerts, and exhibitions.

== History ==
In 2007, the museum was called Wan Chai Livelihood Place. In March 2012, it was renamed as Hong Kong House of Stories

== Facilities ==
Hong Kong House of Stories is divided into two parts. The first is the exhibition area, and the other is the handicraft area.

== Community culture activities ==
Hong Kong House of Stories Public Exhibitions, Community-Guided Tours, Arts and Culture, Promotion Activities, Workshops and Regular Events.

=== Public exhibitions ===
The Hong Kong House of Stories sponsors many exhibitions. For example, there was a 2015 exhibition on the theme of antiques. In addition, there were also exhibitions related to local Hong Kong culture such as Another exhibition 2015 was "Blue House Curio Store. Recognize the old things and bring a story home"

Previous exhibitions include

- "Stall on Street",
- "Hong Kong’s retirement plan"
- "The memories of Hong Hong’s film."
- "In the name of what we believe"
- "Memories under skin"
- "Naamyam exhibition"

=== Community-guided tours ===
Some tours are held to help the public to recognize the change between the past and recent Hong Kong community. Wan Chai Community Cultural Tour and Central Community Cultural Tour are regular tours in which the English version tour is available for the Wan Chai Community tour. Some special tours are held at a particular time of the day. The special tours are Wan Chai Cuisine Tour and Wan Chai Hiking Tour.

=== Arts and culture promotion activities ===
The "Viva Blue House Studio" and the "Community Classroom" are the main programs to promote community arts by organizing different workshops to the public for a better understanding of community arts and local crafts.

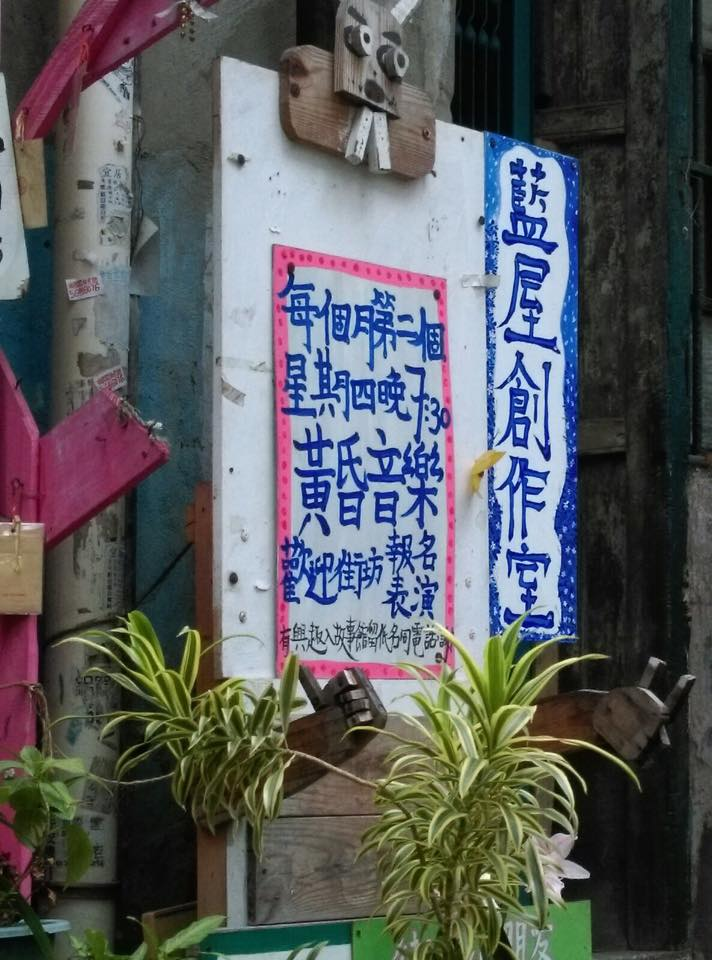
The Viva Blue House Studio

=== Workshops ===
In Community Classroom, there are Community Arts Workshop, Local Crafts Workshop, Traditional Industry Workshop and Traditional Food Workshop organized for the public to learn more about traditional artwork and crafts.

=== Regular events ===
Some events are held every month regularly, for instances, movie sharing, night concert, art studios, neighborhood sharing discussion, etc.

=== Handicraft ===
Hong Kong House of Stories sells handmade souvenirs and helps visitors create their own souvenirs. The income for maintaining the running cost of the Hong Kong House of Stories comes from the donations from visitors by making stamps and notebooks.

== Features ==
=== Elderly staff ===
One of the main features of the Hong Kong House of Stories is that most of the staff are the elderly who are volunteers. It suits the aims and the objectives of this museum which are to pass on the culture as they believe that the elderly is used to be one of the important assets in the territory.

=== Interactive events ===
There are some events for visitors to interact with each other, for example, touring, etc. so as to promote the importance of cultural preservation and to let the general public understand the diverse changes of the old city and the modern territory.
