= Barbara-Rose Collins =

American politician (1939–2021)

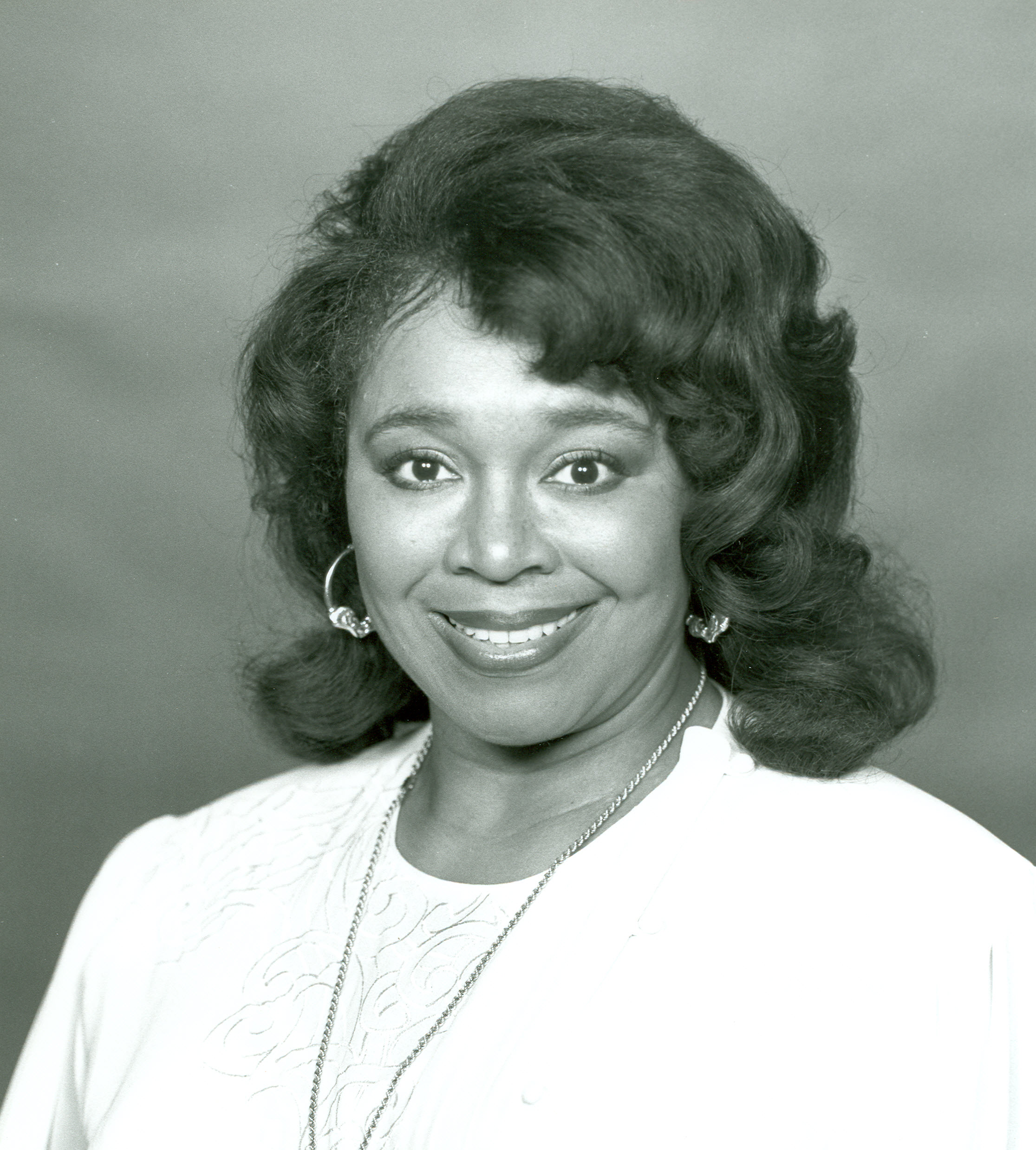

Member of the Detroit City Council
- In office 2001–2009
- In office 1982–1991

Member of the U.S. House of Representatives from Michigan
- In office January 3, 1991 – January 3, 1997
- Preceded by: George W. Crockett, Jr.
- Succeeded by: Carolyn Cheeks Kilpatrick
- Constituency: 13th district (1991–93); 15th district (1993–97)

Member of the Michigan House of Representatives from the 21st district
- In office 1975–1981

Personal details
- Born: April 13, 1939 Detroit, Michigan, U.S.
- Died: November 4, 2021 (aged 82) Detroit, Michigan, U.S.
- Party: Democratic
- Education: Wayne State University (BA)

Barbara-Rose Collins (née Richardson; April 13, 1939 – November 4, 2021) was an American politician from the U.S. state of Michigan and the first Black woman from Michigan to be elected to Congress.

== Life and career ==
Collins was born as Barbara-Rose Richardson in Detroit, Michigan, the daughter of Lou Versa (Jones) and Lamar Nathaniel Richardson, a Ford Motor Co. employee. She is an alumna of Cass Technical High School in Detroit, Michigan where she attended in 1957. She earned a Bachelor of Arts degree in Political Science and Anthropology from Wayne State University.

In 1960, Barbara-Rose Collins became divorced and a single mom. Barbara-Rose Collins worked multiple jobs and had public assistance until beginning a position as a Business Manager at Wayne State University. She worked as a Business Manager for the Physics department at Wayne State University for 9 years.

After hearing a speech by Black activist Stokely Carmichael at Detroit's Shrine of the Black Madonna Church in the late 1960s, Barbara-Rose Collins became inspired by the speech to pursue a career in activism to uplift communities. Later, she was supported by the pastor of the Shrine Church to pursue a career in state legislature. She ran for a seat in 1974.

During her early campaign days in 1974, Collins hyphenated her first and middle names, changing from Barbara Rose to Barbara-Rose, to distinguish herself from other candidates.

Collins was a member of the Detroit Public School Board from 1971 to 1973, the Michigan House of Representatives for the 21st district from 1975 to 1981, and the Detroit City Council from 1982 to 1991. During her time on the Detroit Public School Board, she earned recognition for her "school safety and academic achievement."

In 1988, she lost a primary election to the incumbent U.S. representative for what was then Michigan's 13th congressional district, George W. Crockett, Jr. When he retired, she won the seat, taking 34 percent of the vote in a crowded eight-way Democratic primary. This was tantamount to election in this heavily Democratic, Black-majority district. She won handily in November and was reelected three more times, each time garnering over 80 percent of the vote. Her district was renumbered as the 15th district after the 1990 census.

Collins was a sponsor of several bills that passed into law, including the Food Dating Bill, the Sex Education Bill, and the Pregnancy Insurance Bill. She also introduced the Unrenumerated Work Act in 1991, 1993, and 1994. This bill would have required the Bureau of Labor Statistics to set value on unwaged work such as housework, care work, agricultural work, volunteer work, and work in a family business, and include that value in the Gross National Product of the United States. This measure had been called for in the Forward Looking Strategies resolution passed at the World Conference on Women, 1985. Collins's bill was endorsed by the Congressional Caucus for Women's Issues and by 1993 had 90 co-sponsors; however, it failed to pass.

Collins was the subject of a United States House Committee on Ethics inquiry in 1995, under suspicion of 11 instances of misuse of funds. In 1996, after she lost the Democratic primary for re-election to Carolyn Cheeks Kilpatrick, the inquiry was dropped. After five years out of politics, Collins returned to the Detroit City Council in 2001. She was re-elected in 2005 and retired in 2009.

== Juneteenth ==
In 1996, Collins was the first congressperson to introduce legislation to make Juneteenth a federal holiday. According to the ACLU of Michigan, "Michigan's own Congresswoman Barbara Rose Collins introduced a bill in 1996 that petitioned the U.S. government to make Juneteenth a federal holiday. In her congressional remarks, she stated, "the dehumanizing and degrading conditions of slavery were unnecessarily prolonged for hundreds of thousands of Black men, women, and children, because our American government failed to communicate the truth" (2017). Juneteenth finally became a federal holiday in 2021.

== Death ==
Collins died from COVID-19 at a Detroit hospital, on November 4, 2021, at age 82, during the COVID-19 pandemic in Michigan. According to her son, she had been vaccinated with the Janssen COVID-19 vaccine. According to one of her grandsons, Collins had health issues that contributed to her COVID-19 death despite her vaccination status.

She would lie in state at the Charles H. Wright Museum of African American History on November 12, when her wake was held, and November 13, when her funeral, which was open to the public, was held at the museum as well.

== Personal life ==
Collins was the aunt of actor and comedian Sam Richardson.

== See also ==
- List of African-American United States representatives
- List of federal political scandals in the United States
- Women in the United States House of Representatives

U.S. House of Representatives
Preceded by George W. Crockett, Jr.	Member of the U.S. House of Representatives from Michigan's 13th congressional district 1991–1993	Succeeded by Bill Ford
Preceded by Bill Ford	Member of the U.S. House of Representatives from Michigan's 15th congressional district 1993–1997	Succeeded by Carolyn Cheeks Kilpatrick
