= EDGE Design Institute =

Architecture and interior design firm

EDGE Design Institute Ltd.
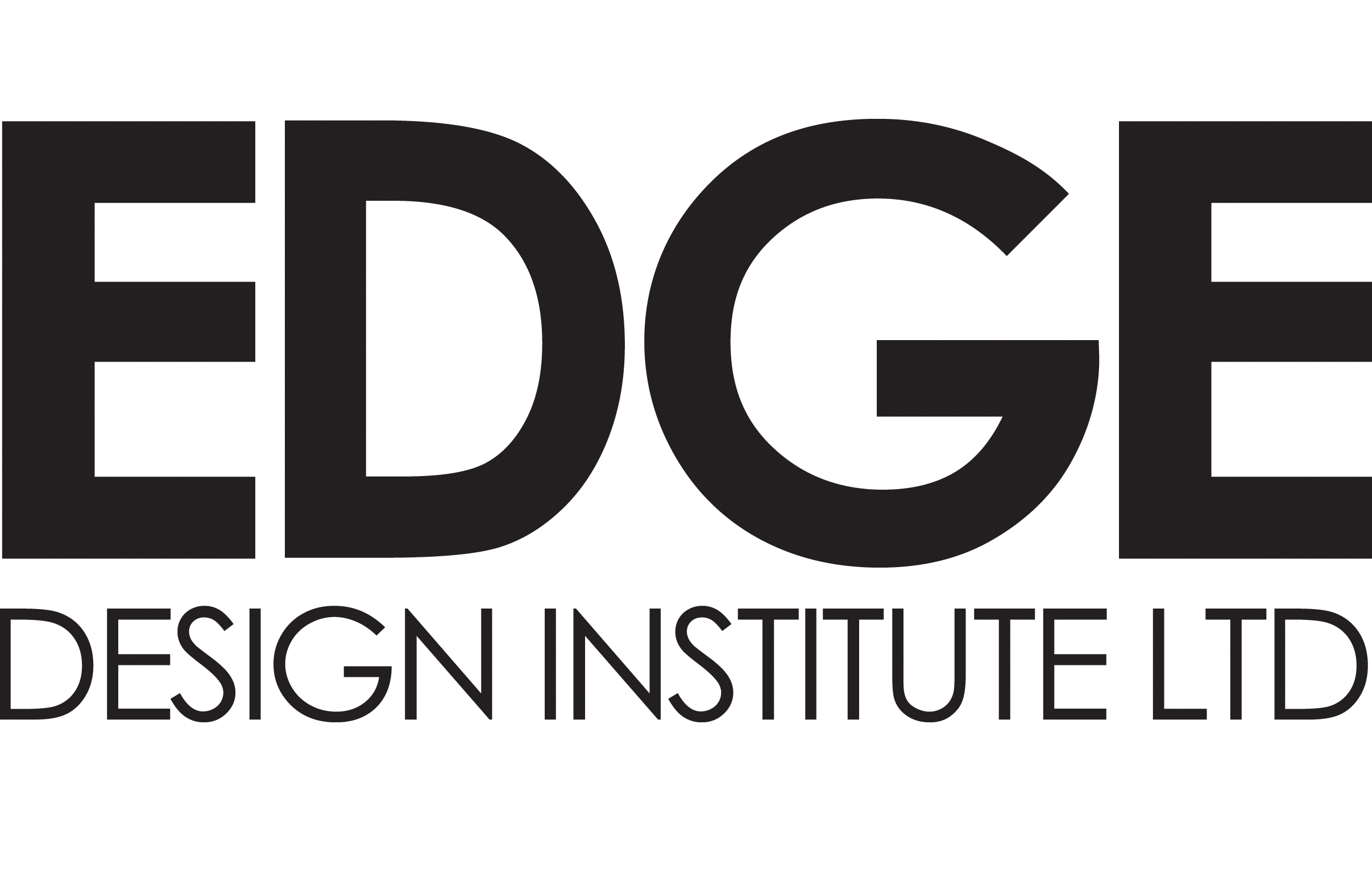
- Formation: 1994
- Services: Architecture, Interior Design, Product Design
- Managing Director: Gary Chang
- Staff: 11-30
- Website: www.edgedesign.com.hk

EDGE Design Institute Ltd. is an architecture and interior design firm founded by Gary Chang in 1994.

== History ==
The studio, EDGE, was established in 1994 by Gary Chang in Hong Kong. It was then renamed to EDGE Design Institute Ltd. in 2003. Soon after the establishment, the studio had numerous notable projects including the Broadway Cinematheque in Yau Ma Tei, office for the Hong Kong Institute of Architects (HKIA) & Architects Registration Board, and the Suitcase House of the Commune by The Great Wall.

EDGE’s project ACTS Rednaxela received Design For Asia Merit award from Hong Kong Design Centre and was featured in Apple TV’s Home (2020 TV series). The building model is exhibited at M+ museum of West Kowloon Cultural District.

== Notable Projects ==
Notable projects, ordered by year of completion in each category:

=== Residential ===
- Domestic Transformer, Hong Kong (2007)
- The Summa, Hong Kong (2013)

=== Hospitality ===
- Suitcase House, Commune by The Great Wall, Beijing (2002)
- ACTS Happy Valley Serviced Apartment, Hong Kong (2007)
- ACTS Rednaxela Serviced Apartment, Hong Kong (2011)
- V Wanchai 2, Hong Kong (2013)
- Park Hyatt Beijing Tian Spa, Beijing (2015)

=== Retail ===
- Chow Sang Sang Flagship Store, Beijing (2008)
- Beauty Avenue, Hong Kong (2013)

=== Products ===
- ALESSI Kung Fu Tea Set (2003)
- LI-NING Sportswear for Hong Kong Fashion Week (2006)
- ALESSI Treasure Box for Urban Nomads (2007)
- ALESSI Trick & Treat (2011)
- Jia Cake Stand (2014)

=== Installations ===
- Strangled Vision - A Hidden Locality, 7th Venice Biennale Exhibition of Architecture, Venice (2000)
- Leisure Slice, Hong Kong (2004)
- The Cascade, Hong Kong (2006)
