= Van der Gouw =

Van der Gouw is a Dutch surname. Notable people with the surname include:

- Ennio van der Gouw (born 2001), Dutch footballer
- Raimond van der Gouw (born 1963), Dutch footballer

== See also ==
- Gouw
- Jessica De Gouw
