= Home (2020 TV series) =

American documentary television series

- Promotional poster
- Genre: Docuseries
- Composers: Christopher Bear; BJ Burton; Garron Chang; Demián Gálvez; Amanda Jones; Camilo Lara; Aska Matsumiya; Ali Shaheed Muhammad; Cali Wang; Adrian Younge
- Country of origin: United States
- Original language: English
- No. of seasons: 2
- No. of episodes: 19

Production
- Executive producers: Matthew Weaver; Joe Poulin; Doug Pray; Ian Orefice; Bruce Gersh; Matt Tyrnauer; Corey Reeser; Collin Orcutt; Kim Rozenfeld
- Production companies: Media Weaver Entertainment; Four M Studios; Altimeter Films; A24 (season 2)

Original release
- Network: Apple TV+
- Release: April 17, 2020 – June 17, 2022

Home is an American documentary television series produced for Apple TV+. In January 2018, Apple gave the production a series order consisting of a single season of nine episodes. It is produced by three media companies: MediaWeaver, Four M Studios and Altimeter Films, premiered on April 17, 2020. On June 8, 2020, Home was nominated for best documentary series at the Critics' Choice Real TV Awards. In May 2022, the series was renewed for a second season which premiered on June 17, 2022.

== Premise ==
Home guides the audience "inside the world's most extraordinary homes and unveils the boundary-pushing imagination of the visionaries who dared to dream and build them."

== Production ==
Home is executive produced by Joe Poulin, Matthew Weaver, Bruce Gersh, Ian Orefice, Doug Pray, Collin Orcutt, Matt Tyrnauer, Corey Reeser and Kim Rozenfeld. Nick Stern serves as co-executive producer. Matt Tyrnauer directed the series. On May 17, 2022, Apple TV+ renewed the series for a second season which premiered on June 17, 2022.

== Episodes ==
=== Series overview ===
Season	Episodes	Originally released
1	9	April 17, 2020
2	10	June 17, 2022

=== Season 1 (2020) ===
No. overall	No. in season	Title	Directed by	Original release date
1	1	"Sweden"	Doug Pray	April 17, 2020
Creating a Mediterranean climate with nurturing space for his autistic son, a father constructs a greenhouse over his family's log cabin.
2	2	"Chicago"	Jessica Dimmock	April 17, 2020
Theaster Gates revitalizes inner-city social spaces to create a new sense of home for his overlooked community.
3	3	"Bali"	Clay Jeter	April 17, 2020
Elora Hardy builds her multi-story, curvilinear home Sharma Springs entirely out of bamboo.
4	4	"Hong Kong"	Matt Tyrnauer	April 17, 2020
Gary Chang solves the problem of living within 344 square foot via the Domestic Transformer, his apartment with moveable walls hung from the ceiling. He also talks about his ACTS Rednaxela project at Rednaxela Terrace, Hong Kong, which is a serviced apartment building developed by ACTS and Goldig Investment Group (協利集團)
5	5	"Maine"	Scott Weintrob	April 17, 2020
6	6	"India"	Jimmy Goldblum; Fazeelat Aslam	April 17, 2020
Anupama Kundoo insists that her Wall House in Auroville, India be built from local materials and handcrafted by local craftspeople - then she duplicates the house full-size at the Vienna Biennale.
7	7	"Austin"	Doug Pray	April 17, 2020
8	8	"Malibu"	Taimi Arvidson	April 17, 2020
David Randall Hertz built his career around repurposing materials. Now, this sustainable architect is giving a second life to an eclectic home.
9	9	"Mexico"	Scott Weintrob	April 17, 2020

=== Season 2 (2022) ===
No. overall	No. in season	Title	Directed by	Original release date
10	1	"Hourré House - Labastide-Villefranche, France"	Unknown	June 17, 2022
A 17th-century farmhouse becomes a serene homestead while providing accessibility and independence for an architect's daughter.
11	2	"Casa de Carla y Pedro - Coyoacán, Mexico City"	Unknown	June 17, 2022
Two renowned artists (Pedro Reyes and Carla Fernández) sculpt a modern-day cave dwelling, mixing contemporary design with traditional Mexican techniques and materials.
12	3	"House of the Big Arch - South Africa"	Lebogang Rasethaba	June 17, 2022
Architecture + design collective Frankie Pappas nestles a remarkable building in the lush canopy of the bush - building a home for two veterinarians with the aim of preserving the region's rich biodiversity.
13	4	"The Concrete Factory - Steypustöðin, Iceland"	Unknown	June 17, 2022
An abandoned concrete factory in a remote fishing town finds new purpose and serves as inspiration to revitalize the dwindling village.
14	5	"Sag Harbor - Long Island, New York"	Unknown	June 17, 2022
Locals from one of the few remaining Black beachfront communities fight to preserve their neighborhood's history and future.
15	6	"Three Generation House - Amsterdam"	Unknown	June 17, 2022
To accommodate his growing family, an architect redefines how multiple generations live harmoniously under the same roof.
16	7	"Longhouse - Daylesford, Australia"	Unknown	June 17, 2022
Determined to nurture a life of continued learning, a couple build a sustainable oasis that combines their love of farming and gastronomy.
17	8	"Guha - Villa Meruya, Indonesia"	Unknown	June 17, 2022
An architect's passion for experimentation transforms a bioclimatic house into a microcosm of his world and playground for his imagination.
18	9	"Bene's House - Barcelona, Spain"	Unknown	June 17, 2022
A restored gothic villa - with centuries-old frescoes, archways, and carvings - becomes an homage to a love lost too soon.
19	10	"Inno-Native House - Accra, Ghana"	Lebogang Rasethaba	June 17, 2022
Built using native materials and techniques, a beautifully modern home is a call for future designers to decolonize building practices.
