= Gary Chang (architect) =

Hong Kong architect

- Education: Department of Architecture, University of Hong Kong
- Occupations: Managing Director, EDGE Design Institute Ltd.
- Known for: Architecture, Interior Design, Compact Living, Travelling
- Notable work: Suitcase House (Commune by The Great Wall), Domestic Transformer (A 32 sq.m apartment), ALESSI Kung Fu Tea Set, ACTS Rednaxela Serviced Apartment, TIAN Spa of Park Hyatt Beijing
- Website: http://www.edgedesign.com.hk

Gary Chang
- Traditional Chinese: 張智強
- Simplified Chinese: 张智强
Transcriptions
Standard Mandarin
- Hanyu Pinyin: Zhāng Zhìqiáng
Yue: Cantonese
- Jyutping: zoeng1 zi3 koeng4

Gary Chang (張智強, born 1962) is an architectural designer from Hong Kong who has designed projects throughout Mainalnd China, Hong Kong, Japan, the Middle East, as well as Europe. He is known for his cost effective, flexible designs which focus on spatial qualities. Chang’s designs can be categorized as modern or contemporary architecture. He is also known for his home, the Domestic Transformer, which can turn into "24 rooms" within a limited space of 32 sq.m. He is currently the Managing Director of EDGE Design Institute Ltd., the renowned company he founded in 1994.

== Early life and education ==
Chang was born in 1962 and raised in Hong Kong. He studied at the Queen's College and later graduated from the University of Hong Kong in 1987 with an Architecture degree.

== Career ==
After graduation from the University of Hong Kong, Chang worked at P&T Group, an Architectural firm in Hong Kong.

In 1994, Chang founded his first company, EDGE. The company was renamed EDGE Design Institute Ltd in 2003. The company works on projects for houses, retails, hotels, restaurants, and offices, and also creates products such as furniture, houseware, etc.

Chang’s architecture focuses on concepts of urban space, form and material. Most of his work concentrates on flexible designs with transforming interior spaces and architecture. He has become an influential figure in designs for compact living spaces.

=== Domestic Transformer ===
One of Chang's best known works is of his own home in Hong Kong, the project known as the Domestic Transformer. Space in Hong Kong homes has become increasingly limited because of a growing population. Chang uses his architecture skills to find solutions to crowding for the people of Hong Kong. He has lived in the same 344 square foot apartment since he was a child, and has experimented frequently with space-saving strategies as part of his research. His designs combine comfortable living, efficient use of space and practical day-to-day function.

The Domestic Transformer is the fourth design created by Chang for this apartment. It can transform into twenty-four different rooms through the use of sliding walls and panels. This project is comparable to a puzzle, where pieces are continuously being unfolded, while others are folded/fitted back together to create new rooms and spaces.

=== Suitcase House, Commune by The Great Wall ===
Another design by Gary Chang is the Suitcase House located in Beijing by the Great Wall of China. This project is one of the hotels designed for the Commune by The Great Wall, where various notable Asian architects (such as Shigeru Ban, Kengo Kuma, Yung Ho Chang, etc.) were invited to design. Similar to the Domestic Transformer, the space in the Suitcase House could adapt to different uses and programmes flexibly. This design is 44 meters by 5 meters wide, shaped like a long rectangular box. It is made from mostly timber, concrete and steel for structural support. The Suitcase House transforms from a public gathering space during the daytime to a multi-spatial hotel structure to shelter guests at night, all through uses of alternating panels and doors.

=== ACTS Serviced Apartments ===
Edge Design Institute was appointed by ACTS, a developer and operator of serviced apartments, to design two buildings in Hong Kong, one in Happy Valley and another in Mid-levels. ACTS is owned by Carl Gouw (吳家耀), who collaborated with Gary Chang on showcasing compact living with ACTS Serviced Apartments. ACTS is involved in real estate, design and construction. Carl Gouw is a veteran of luxury design projects for decades and was a committee member of Hong Kong Ambassadors of Design.

ACTS Rednaxela is mentioned in the book ‘Urbanizing Carescapes of Hong Kong ‘ written by Shu-mei Huang.

=== Other notable works ===
Chang has also designed the Kung Fu Tea Set for Italian houseware brand ALESSI; A "Workstation" for Ogilvy & Mather Asia Pacific; The Kitagata Housing Product in Gifu; The Hong Kong Pavilion at the 50th Anniversary of the PRC, Beijing in 1999. He also designed interiors at the Treasure Palace development in Hong Kong.

== Selected works ==
=== Architecture and interior ===
- Nano Apartment, Hong Kong (2016)
- Private Music Studio, Hong Kong (2016)
- TIAN Spa at Park Hyatt Beijing, Beijing (2015)
- The Arch, Hong Kong (2014)
- Hotel V Wanchai, Hong Kong (2012)
- ACTS Rednaxela Serviced Apartment (2011)
- ACTS Happy Valley, Hong Kong (2007)
- Domestic Transformer, Hong Kong (2007)
- Suitcase House, Beijing (2002)
- Hong Kong Institute of Architects and Architects Registration Board Office, Hong Kong (1997)
- Broadway Cinematheque, Hong Kong (1995)

=== Exhibition and display ===
- A Globalized Locality (Shanghai Jian'An International Sculpture), Shanghai (2017)
- Furniture Wall (Milan Confluence. 20+), Milan (2017)
- Leisure Slice, Hong Kong (2004)
- Strangled Reality (7th International Biennial Exhibition of Architecture), Venice (2000)

=== Product ===
- ALESSI, Trick and Treat (2011)
- ALESSI, Treasure Box for Urban Nomads (2007)
- ALESSI, Kung Fu Tea Set Tea & Coffee Tower (2003)
- Light Hotel (2001)
- The Cabana Workstation for O&M Asia-Pacific (1996)

== Awards ==
Chang has won multiple awards, including the ar+d Awards in 2002 and 2003 in Copenhagen and London for Light Hotel and Suitcase House. Gary Chang was also included in "40 Architects Under 40" by Taschen in 2000. The Domestic Transformer won the Design for Asia Award 2009 Grand Award and Bronze Award. Chang has won many other awards in Asia and throughout the world for his reconfigurable living spaces and product designs.

Chang’s project ACTS Rednaxela Terrace was awarded Design for Asia Merit award from Hong Kong Design Centre. The building model is exhibited at M+ museum of West Kowloon Cultural District.

== Publications ==
- 《好旅館默默在做的事：設計大師眼中最關鍵的 37 個條件》 ( 2017 ), Business Weekly, ISBN 978-986-93733-8-8
- 《My 32m2 Apartment - A 30 Years Transformation》 ( 2012 ), MCCM Creations, ISBN 978-988-99842-6-7
- 《Hotel As Home》 ( 2005 ), MCCM Creations, ISBN 978-988-97610-5-9
- 《Suitcase House》 ( 2004 ), MCCM Editions, ISBN 978-962-86816-9-3
- 《My 100 Hotels As Home 2004 - 2009》 ( 2009 )
