= Gouws =

Gouws is a surname. Notable people with the surname include:

- Johannes Gouws (1919–1944), South African Air Force officer
- Liezel Gouws (born 1999), South African Paralympic athlete
- Pierre Gouws (born 1960), Zimbabwean cyclist
- Rowan Gouws (born 1995), South African rugby union player

== See also ==
- Gouw
