= 7 Mallory Street =

Building in Hong Kong

- 茂蘿街7號
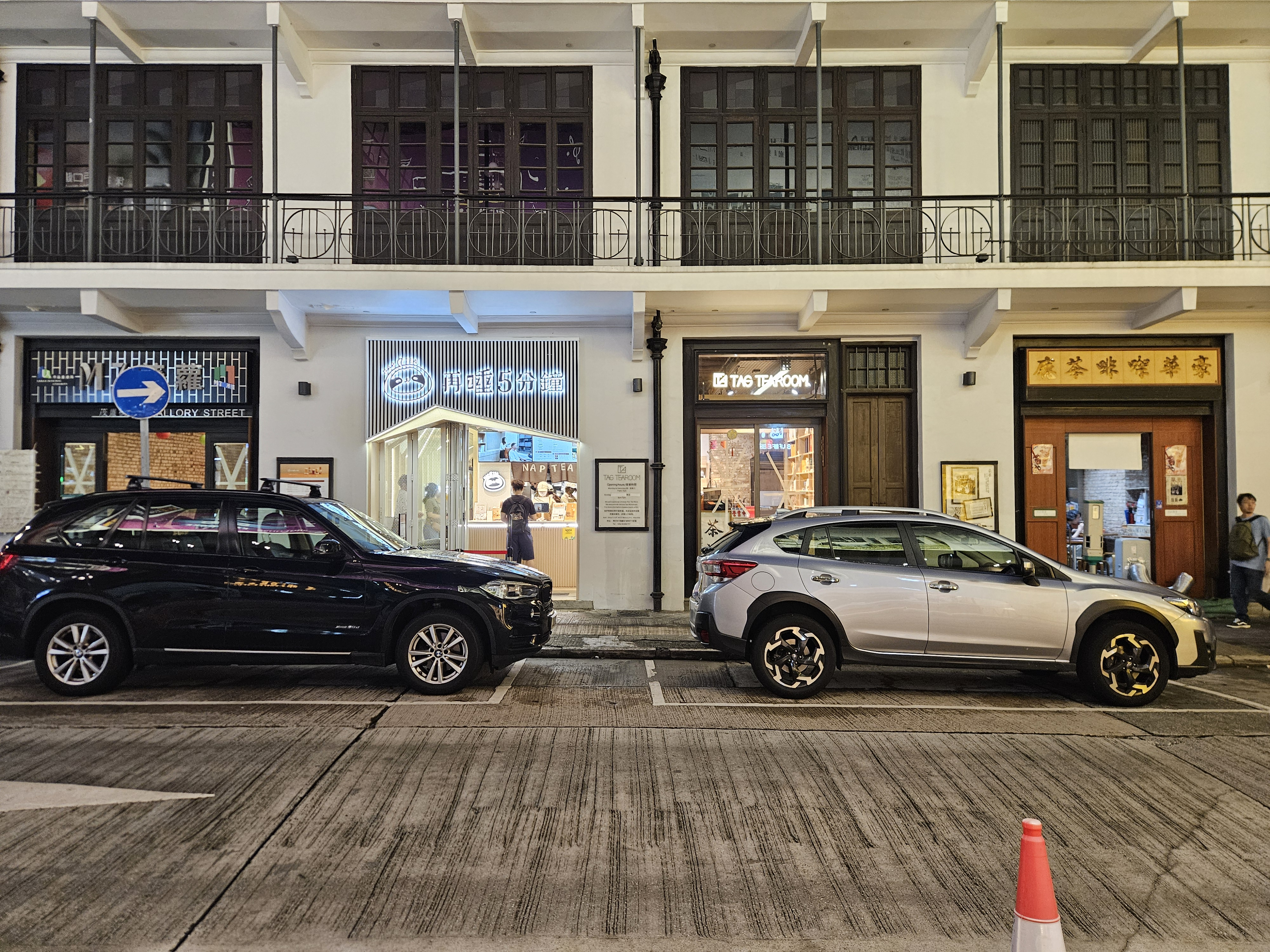
- Green House, Hong Kong after its revitalisation in October 2025.

- Location within Hong Kong
- Former names: Green House; Comix Home Base

General information
- Location: 1–11, Mallory Street and 6–12 Burrows Street, Wan Chai, Hong Kong, Hong Kong
- Coordinates: 22.27722°N 114.17665°E
- Current tenants: Federation of Hong Kong Writers (The Museum of Hong Kong Literature, 3/F)
- Completed: 1922
- Client: Hong Kong Arts Centre (former)
- Owner: Hong Kong Land Investment Company (former); Urban Renewal Authority
- Landlord: Hong Kong Land Investment Company (former); Government of Hong Kong (former); Lands Department

Technical details
- Floor count: 4

Other information
- Public transit: Wan Chai Station (Exit A3); Exhibition Centre station (Exit A3); Tonnochy Road, Burrows Street

7 Mallory Street, formerly Comix Home Base and Green House and currently simply known as M7, is a block of ten tenement houses located at 1–11, Mallory Street and 6–12 Burrows Street, Wan Chai, Hong Kong. Its former name derives from the green colour painted on the external walls of the building. It is one of the few remaining tong-lau of the balcony type in Hong Kong. Because of its historic significance, the houses are listed as Grade II historic buildings.

== Historic background ==
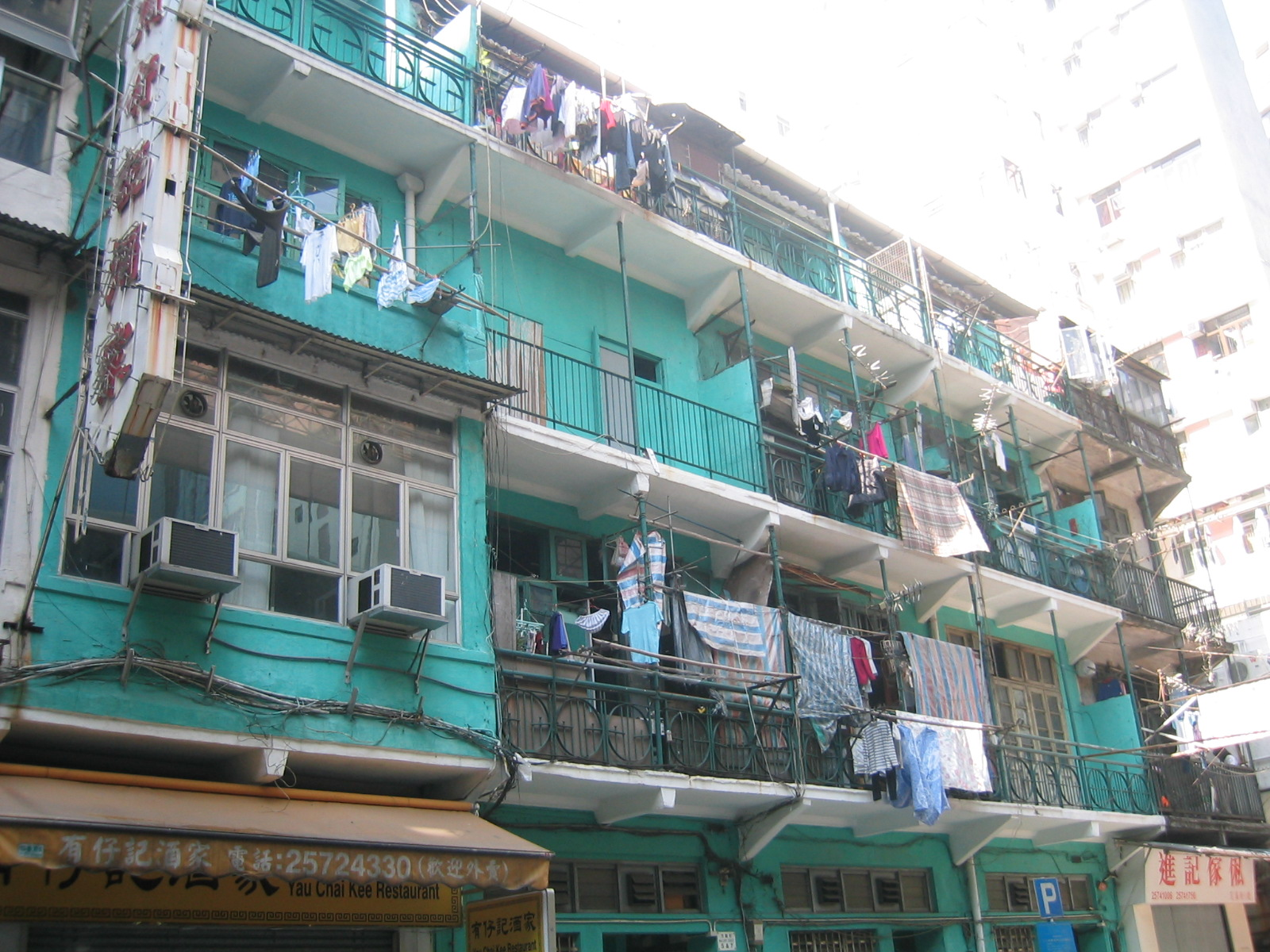
The Green House

The property where the tenement house is currently located was first owned by the American firm Messrs Burrows and Sons. It was later owned by Lawrence Mallory. A timber yard and boat building yard previously occupied the site. It was later occupied by warehouses, timber and coal storage and several other small industries.

Around 1905, Hong Kong Land Investment Company took possession and in the mid-1920s, the company demolished the former buildings and developed 10 tenement houses on its former site in two phases, with the first phase been completed between 1916 and 1922. At first the tenement house had no name, but after the government took over the building in the later years, its outer walls were painted green, hence the name Green House.

In 2005, Green House became the first preservation project of the Urban Renewal Authority, and in 2007 the Lands Department took over the ownership of the house. The house was later renovated and officially opened on 18 July 2013 as the Comix Home Base by the Hong Kong Arts Centre and was no longer known as the Green House.

Aedas as Design and Documentation Architect was awarded a Medal of the Year of Hong Kong by the Hong Kong Institute of Architects for its design of the preserved buildings.

Upon its opening, the Comix Home Base had a record total of 250,000 visitor records in 2013. There are more than 40 educational groups with more than 2,000 people, including primary and secondary school students, who had visited the base and attended its comic activities. In the past five years, 545 exhibitions and events were held there, with a total attendance of more than 1 million people.

However, due to its location being further away from the MTR station and the lack of human traffic led to its operational difficulties and many exhibitions were only attended by the arts industry participants. The URA stopped its operations upon the expiration of its contract period in July 2018 and renamed it to 7 Mallory Street.

Currently, only the shops and restaurants on the ground floor and second floor are operating their businesses there, while the fourth floor once occupied by Comix Home Base has remained vacant since then.

Since its grand opening in 2024, The Museum of Hong Kong Literature occupies the entirety of the third floor.

== Public transport ==
7 Mallory Street is accessible within walking distance east from Exit A3 of Wan Chai station or south from Exit A3 of Exhibition Centre station on the MTR, or from Tonnochy Road or Burrows Street (westbound only) stops on the tram.

== See also ==
- Wan Chai Heritage Trail
- Hong Kong Arts Centre
- Blue House (Hong Kong)
