= Broadway Cinematheque =

Cinema in Yau Ma Tei, Hong Kong

Coordinates: 22.310701°N 114.168924°E

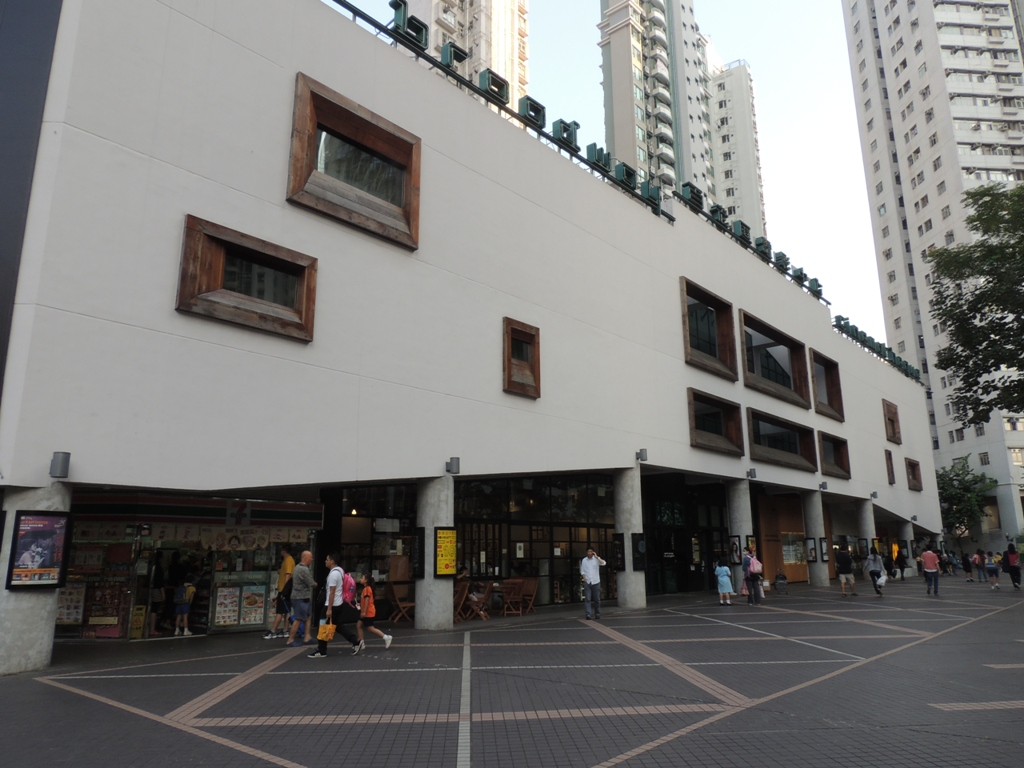
- Broadway Cinematheque, Yau Ma Tei
- Interactive map of the Broadway Cinematheque area

General information
- Location: Prosperous Garden, 3 Public Square Street, Yau Ma Tei, Kowloon, Hong Kong
- Opened: 20 November 1996; 29 years ago

Design and construction
- Architect: Gary Chang (EDGE Design Institute)

Website
- bc.cinema.com.hk

Chinese name
- Traditional Chinese: 百老匯電影中心
- Simplified Chinese: 百老汇电影中心
- Hanyu Pinyin: Bǎilǎohuì Diànyǐng Zhōngxīn
- Yale Romanization: Baaklóuhwuih Dihnyíng Jūngsām
- Jyutping: baak3 lou5 wui6 din6 jing2 zung1 sam1

Broadway Cinematheque (Chinese: 百老匯電影中心) is a cinema in Yau Ma Tei, Hong Kong, run by Broadway Circuit. Located in Prosperous Garden, a public housing estate, the cinema screens a wider spectrum of films including independent and art films than other cinemas in Hong Kong. The cinema hosts four houses with 476 seats (115 normal seats + 4 wheelchair seats per house). It also has a book store, Kubrick, which specializes in books about films, and has a café adjacent to it.

== History ==
Broadway Cinematheque's building was designed by Gary Chang, who founded the EDGE Design Institute in 1994. The cinema opened on 20 November 1996, the day of the Garley Building fire in the adjoining Jordan neighbourhood, and as a result business on its first day was quite poor.

The cinema's initial strategy of showing only art film proved to be unsustainable, and so around 2000 it began showing mainstream films on two of its four screens. It is owned by Edko Films, which according to Broadway Cinematheque director Gary Mak is content for the cinema to break even in order to grow an audience for non-mainstream film in Hong Kong. It has served as a venue for film festivals such as the Hong Kong Asian Film Festival. In July 2019, Clarence Tsui succeeded Gary Mak as the director of Broadway Cinematheque.

== See also ==
- List of cinemas in Hong Kong
