= The Museum of Hong Kong Literature =

Literary museum in Hong Kong

- 香港文學館
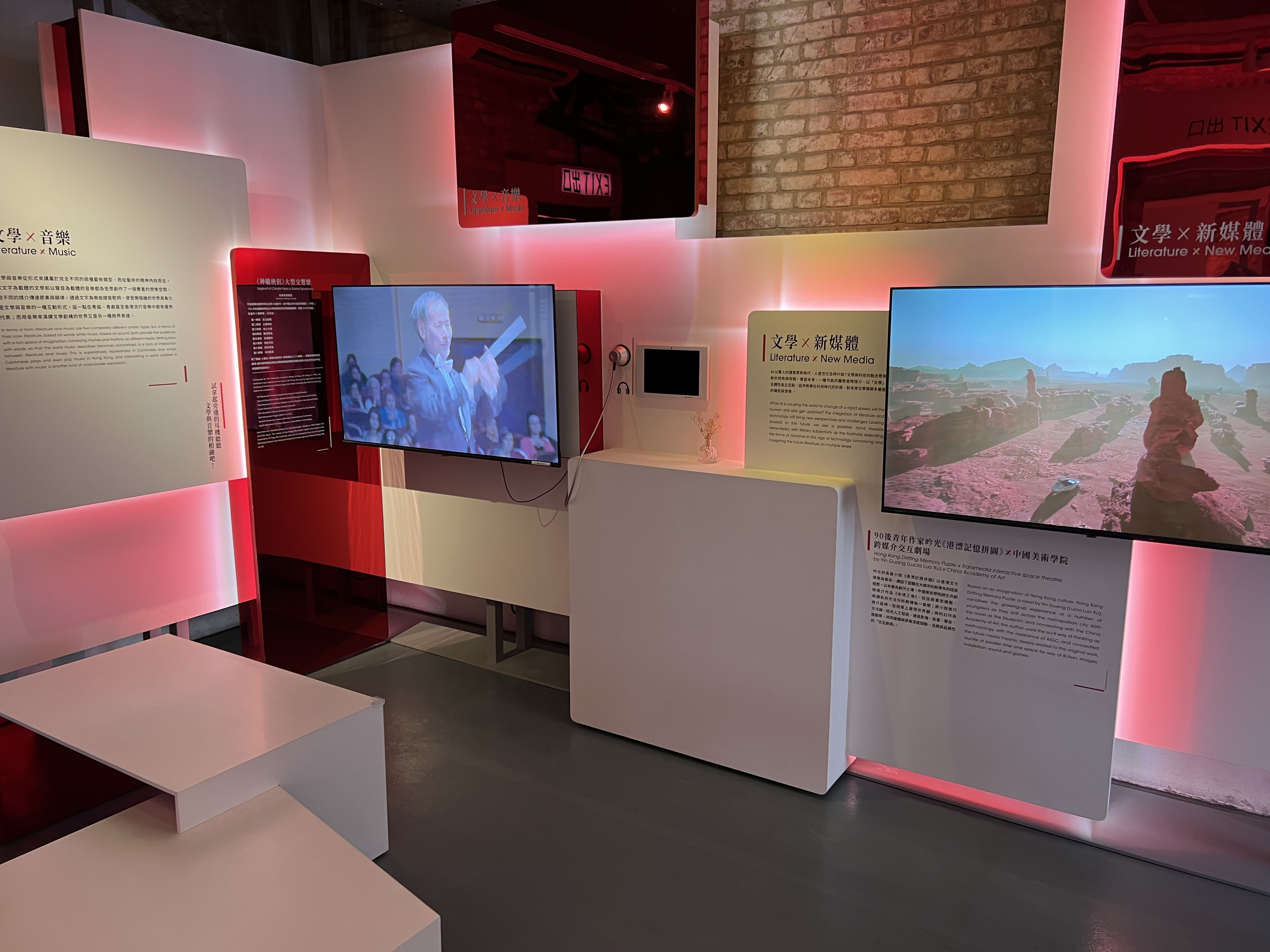
- Inside one of the permanent exhibition galleries
- Established: 27 May 2024; 2 years ago
- Location: 3/F, 7 Mallory Street, Wan Chai, Hong Kong, Hong Kong
- Coordinates: 22.27722°N 114.17665°E
- Type: Literary museum
- Director: Anthony Poon Yiu-ming
- Curator: Candy Lo
- Owner: Federation of Hong Kong Writers
- Public transit access: Wan Chai station (Exit A3); Exhibition Centre station (Exit A3); Tonnochy Road
- Website: mhkl.com.hk

The Museum of Hong Kong Literature
- Traditional Chinese: 香港文學館
Transcriptions
Yue: Cantonese
- Yale Romanization: Hēung góng màhn hohk gún
- Jyutping: Hoeng1 gong2 man4 hok6 gun2

The Museum of Hong Kong Literature (MHKL) is a literary museum in Wan Chai, Hong Kong, managed by the Federation of Hong Kong Writers (FHKW). Opened on 27 May 2024, located on the third floor of 7 Mallory Street, the museum showcases the heritage of Hong Kong literature and enhances communication between authors and the public.

As of 23 April 2026, it is the region's sole literary museum.

== History ==
The history of the museum's establishment is complex.

The origins of the MHKL stem back to 2004, when the FHKW proposed that the city must establish its own literary museum, signed by 34 people. Two years later, in 2006, Anthony Poon Yiu-ming, convener for the preparation for the museum, led a delegation to Japan for a study tour, taking inspiration from the 70 large-scale literary museums across the country. He made constant efforts and wrote articles in a number of journals, calling that the MHKL must be established urgently. He expressed this in November 2019 during a visit with Tie Ning, chairman of the China Writers Association, to meet the then-Chief Executive.

In July 2018, Poon, on behalf of the Federation, proposed for the museum to be established in West Kowloon, according to his writing to Tang Ying-nin, chairman of the Board of WKCD Authority. Nearly four years later, in 2022, he wrote to John Lee Ka-chiu hoping that he will support the establishment of the MHKL; after Lee took office as Chief Executive, the preparation team was supported by the Culture, Sports, and Tourism Bureau and planning for the MHKL formally started.

In January 2023, the museum is decided to be located on the third floor of 7 Mallory Street and the first board meeting was held in August that year, at which Poon was appointed director and curator of the museum and Lo Kwong-ping as the assistant director. In September, the Cultural and Academic Collection Committee was established, soon holding its first meeting.

Finally, on 27 May 2024, the MHKL was officially opened to the public.

== Exhibits and features ==
The museum consists of three permanent exhibitions, each one occupying a room:

- Unfold the Scroll of Hong Kong Literature
- Select Manuscripts of the Southbound Writers
- Literature and Interdisciplinary Arts

The museum also contains a children's story room and a reading room focusing on Hong Kong as well as international literature. There is also a souvenir shop that sells books and content related to Hong Kong literature.

== Public transport ==
Like 7 Mallory Street itself, the museum is accessible within walking distance east from Exit A3 of Wan Chai station or south from Exit A3 of Exhibition Centre station on the MTR, or south from Tonnochy Road or Burrows Street (westbound only) stops on the tram.

== See also ==
- 7 Mallory Street
- List of buildings and structures in Hong Kong
- List of museums in Hong Kong
