= Clarence Tsui =

Hong Kong film critic

- 徐匡慈
- Born: Tsui Hong-chee; Hong Kong
- Education: Chinese University of Hong Kong (BSocSc)
- Occupations: Film critic; Curator
- Years active: 2005–present

Clarence Tsui Hong-chee (Chinese: 徐匡慈) is a Hong Kong film critic and curator. He has written for the South China Morning Post and Oriental Daily News, and served as the Asia bureau chief for The Hollywood Reporter. He is currently the director of Broadway Cinematheque.

== Biography ==
Tsui studied journalism at the Chinese University of Hong Kong and received a scholarship from Star TV in his final year in 1995. After graduating, he became a staff writer for the South China Morning Post, and transitioned to Oriental Daily News as a political writer in 1997. He later returned to the South China Morning Post as a film editor and contributed to the Post from 2005 to 2012, before joining The Hollywood Reporter. He served as the Asia bureau chief for THR until August 2013, when Clifford Coonan took over the role, and became a senior film reviewer for THR. Due to his background as a political journalist, Tsui explains that his film reviews are more rooted in cultural and social commentary rather than "solely aesthetics or film theory". In 2016, he curated a documentary screening series on the People's Socialist Republic of Albania for the Cinéma du Réel at the Centre Pompidou in Paris, France. Tsui later left THR and returned to the South China Morning Post as a columnist on Sinophone cinema before 2019. As of May 2019, he was teaching journalism and film at the Chinese University of Hong Kong.

In July 2019, Tsui succeeded Gary Mak as the director of Broadway Cinematheque. His first project was serving as the artistic director for the 16th Hong Kong Asian Film Festival. During the COVID-19 pandemic, Tsui introduced a remastered classics screening program at the Cinematheque. He also served as the curator for the Three Continents Festival at Nantes in 2023 and 2024, which featured retrospectives on Hong Kong filmmakers Derek Yee and Ann Hui respectively.
