= Shrine of the Black Madonna =

- Shrine of the Black Madonna of the Pan African Orthodox Christian Church
- U.S. National Register of Historic Places
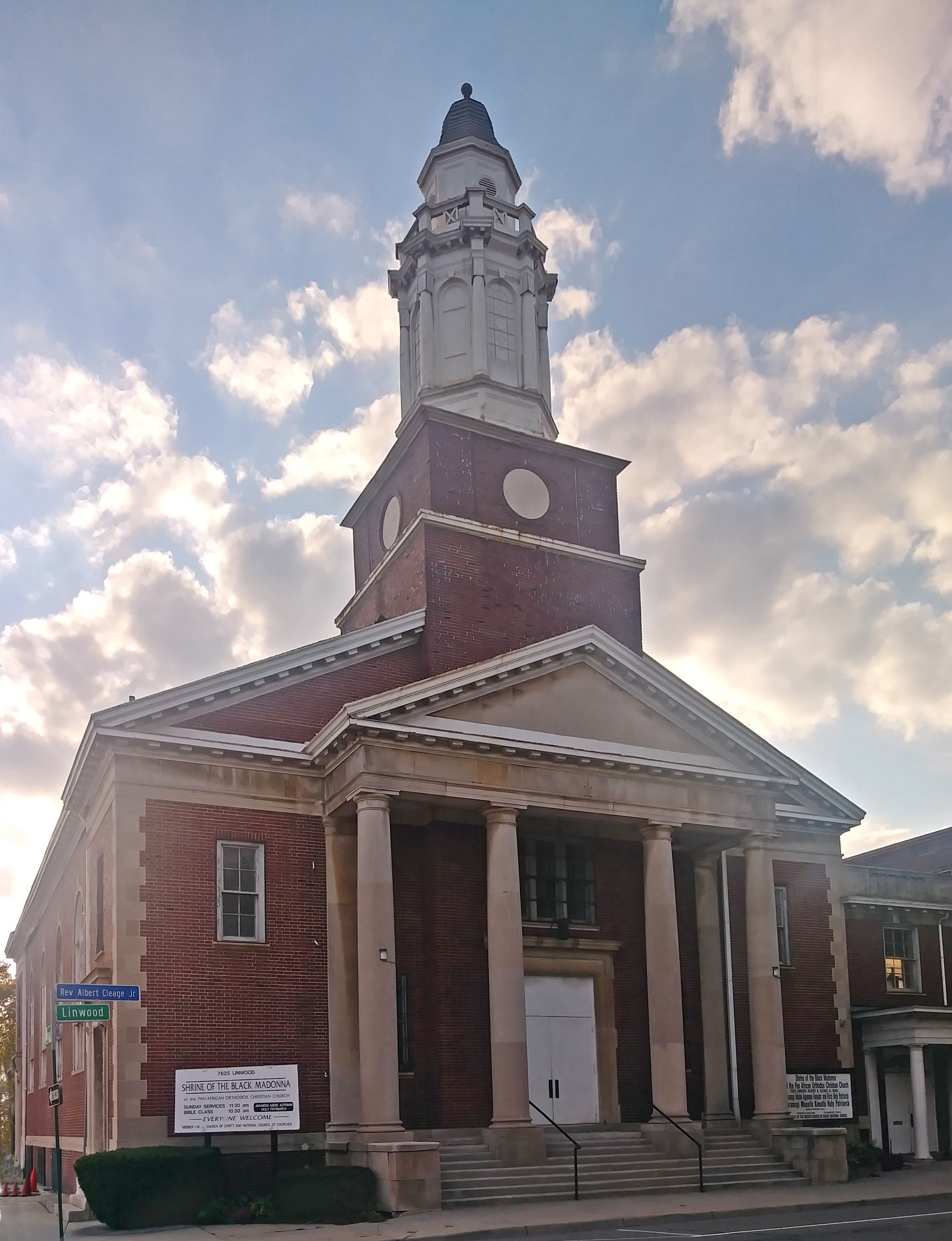
- Front of church
- Interactive map
- Location: 7625 Linwood St. Detroit, Michigan
- Coordinates: 42°21′47″N 83°6′7″W
- Built: 1925
- Architect: George D. Mason
- Architectural style: Colonial
- MPS: The Civil Rights Movement and the African American Experience in 20th Century Detroit MPS
- NRHP reference No.: 100006132
- Added to NRHP: February 5, 2021

The Shrine of the Black Madonna of the Pan African Orthodox Christian Church, or more simply the Shrine of the Black Madonna, is a church building located at 7625 Linwood Street in Detroit, Michigan. It is significant for its association with civil rights leader Rev. Albert B. Cleage Jr., and as the location of many significant 20th century African American civil rights activities. The building was listed on the National Register of Historic Places in 2021.

== Building History ==
Around 1915, the recently formed Pilgrim Congregational Church (later known as Brewster-Pilgrim Congregational Church) constructed a single-story, stuccoed building just north of this location. In 1925, the congregation hired architect George D. Mason to design the current brick structure. The building was completed in 1926. Three years later the original wooden church was burned, and the congregation replaced it with a church hall, which was completed in 1930.

== Shrine of the Black Madonna ==
By the late 1950s, the congregation of Brewster-Pilgrim Congregational Church was shrinking. This was likely due to movement of white residents to the suburbs, although Brewster-Pilgrim sponsored citywide interracial events as early as the 1940s. The congregation moved to Livonia and put the building on Linwood up for sale. In 1957, it was purchased by Central Congregational Church, led by Reverend Albert B. Cleage Jr.

The church soon became a center of the civil rights movement in Detroit, and Cleage himself participated nearly every civil rights activity in the city. In 1963, Cleage and other religious leaders organized the Detroit Walk to Freedom, drawing 125,000 or more participants. As the 1960s progressed, Cleage continued political and civil rights activities, and turned to a more Black Nationalist view.

In 1967, Cleage and the Central Congregational Church commissioned local Black artist Glanton Dowdell to paint a mural of the Black Madonna, replacing a stained glass window depicting the Pilgrims (left from the old Brewster-Pilgrim Congregational Church). The mural was unveiled in Easter Sunday, and polarized the church congregation, with some who were unsympathetic to Cleage's Black Nationalist views leaving the church. However, the 1967 Detroit rebellion accelerated Cleage's activism, and he renamed his church after the mural of the Black Madonna.

Cleage was a leader in the Detroit civil rights community through the 1960s and 1970s, but also began focusing on church development and education. He expanded the Shrine to several new locations, both in Detroit and in other states (notably Atlanta, Georgia and Houston, Texas). Cleage died in 2000, but the church congregation remains, led by a new generation of leaders.

== Description ==
The church building is a two-story, rectangular structure made from red brick with stone trim. The front-gabled roof is covered with asphalt shingles and topped with a bell tower located at the center front. A two-story Doric portico, topped with a pediment, runs across the front. A projecting section under the portico contains paired entry doors. Above the entry is a triple window, and to either side of the entry bay are narrow vertical window openings on the first floor. The second floor contains window openings on wither side of the portico.

The nearby church hall is a two-story, rectangular structure made from red brick with stone trim. It is five bays wide, with each bay containing paired windows on both floors. The center three bays project slightly and are outlined with quoining. The church and hall are connected with a narrow, single-story kitchen.

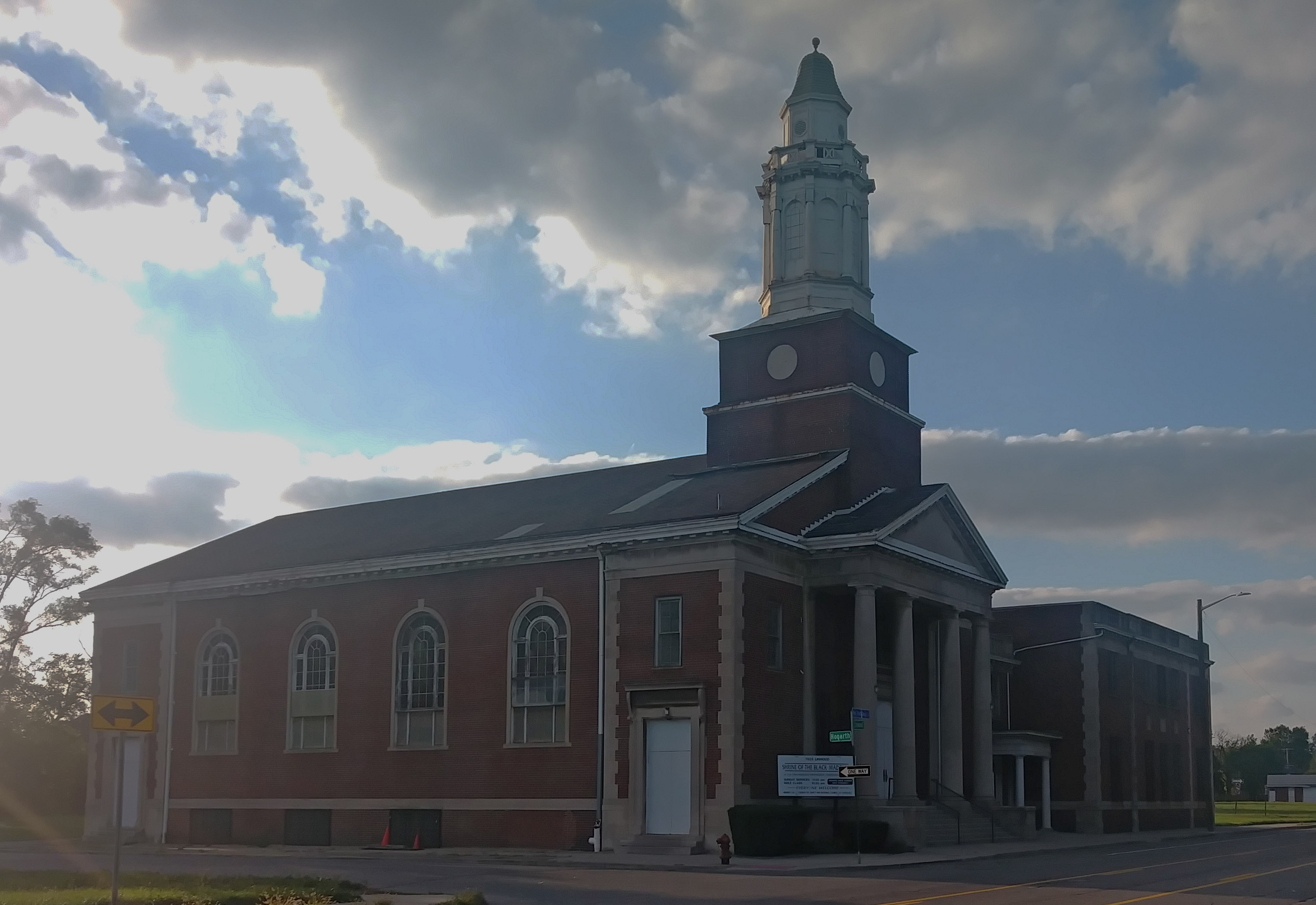

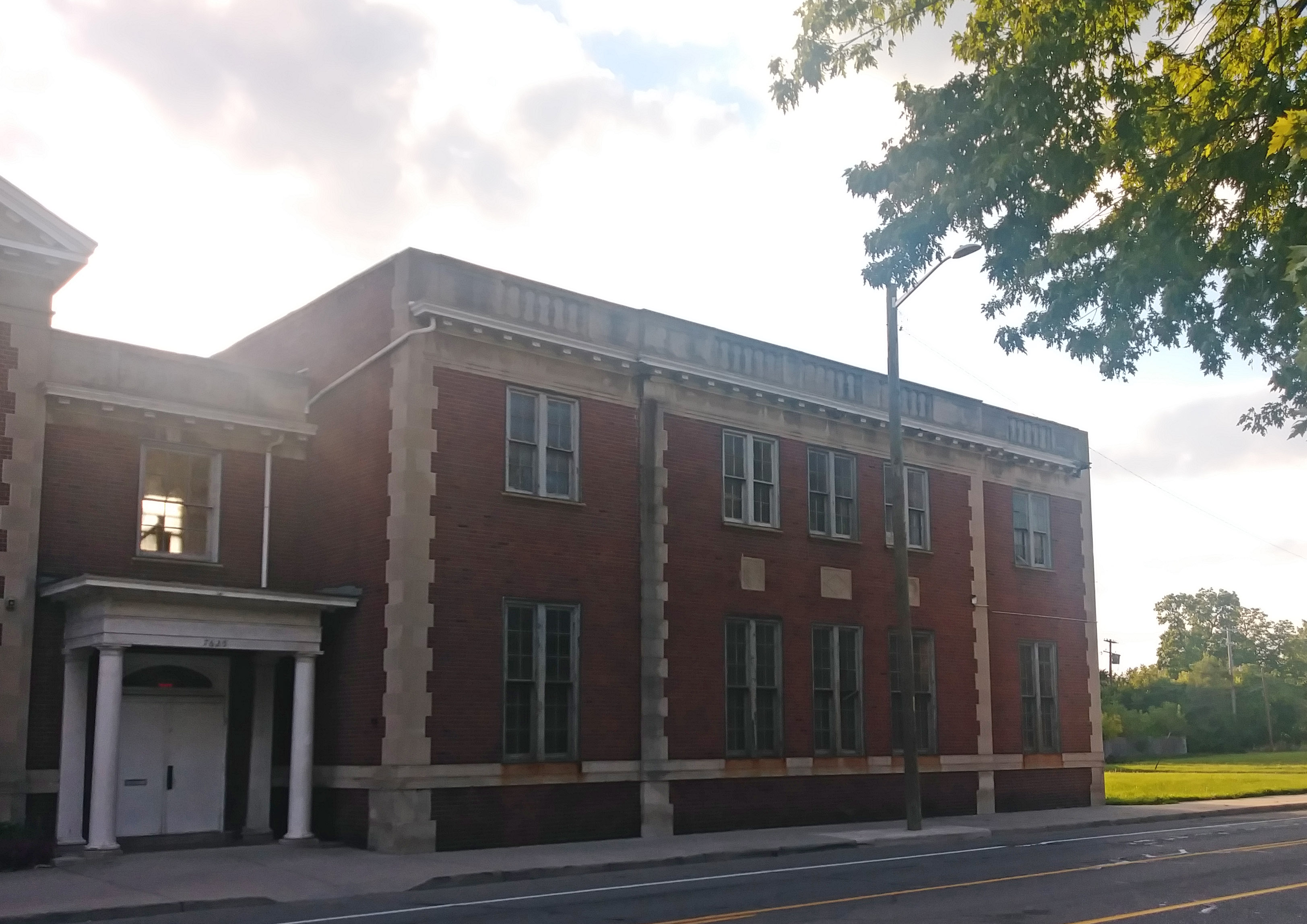
Hall
