= Stone Nullah Lane =

Street in Hong Kong

Coordinates: 22.2740°N 114.1740°E

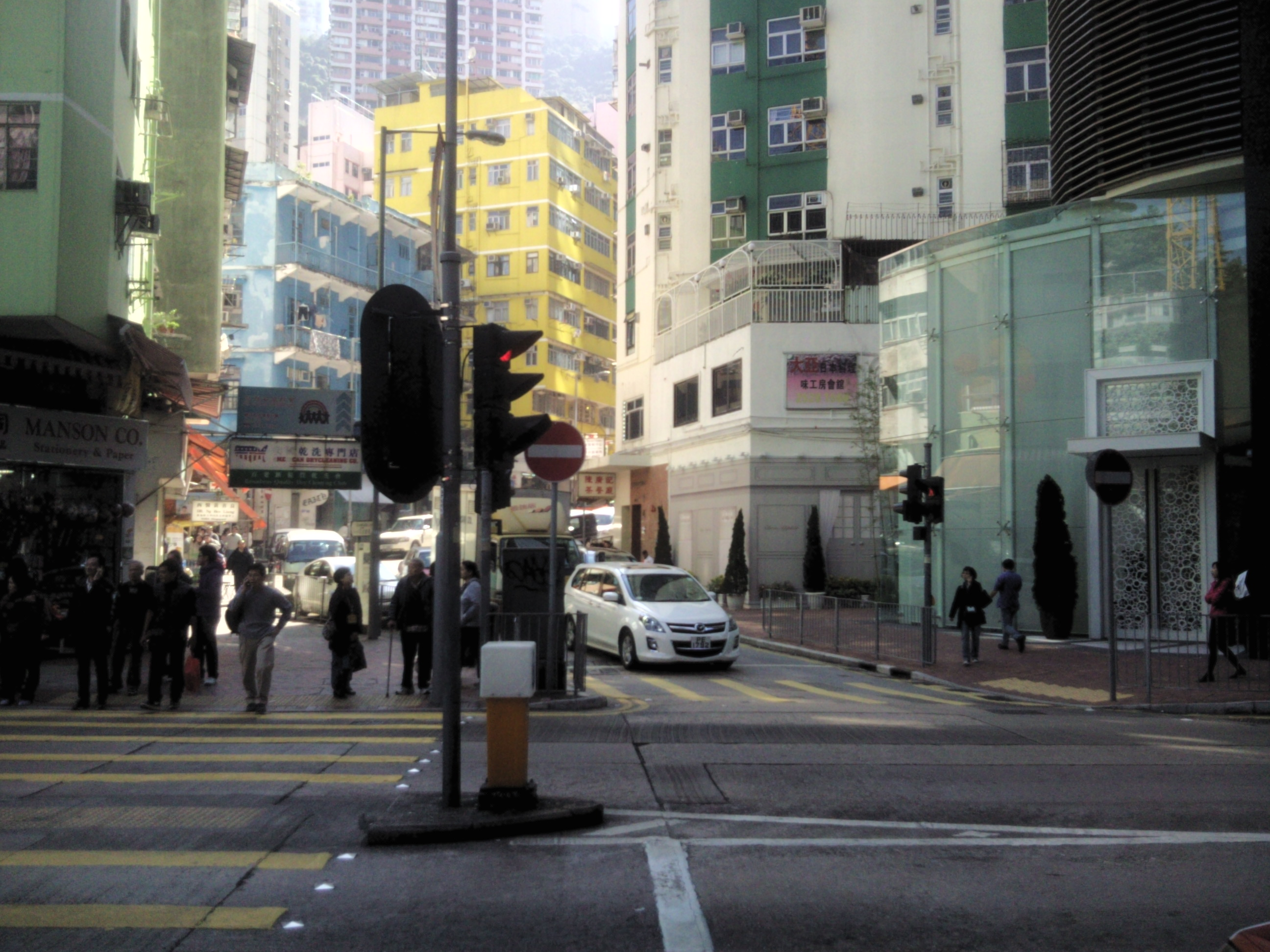
- The northern end of Stone Nullah Lane at the junction with Queen's Road East. The Blue House can be seen in the background (left).
- Interactive map of Stone Nullah Lane
- Native name: 石水渠街 (Chinese)
- Length: 140 m (460 ft)
- Location: Wan Chai, Hong Kong
- South end: Lung On Street
- North end: Queen's Road East

Stone Nullah Lane
- Traditional Chinese: 石水渠街
Transcriptions
Standard Mandarin
- Hanyu Pinyin: Shí Shuǐqú Jiē
Yue: Cantonese
- Yale Romanization: Sek6 seoi2 keoi4 gaai1

Stone Nullah Lane is a street in Wan Chai, Hong Kong Island. Named after the water channel which ran down the centre of the street until 1959, it begins at the corner of Lung On Street, and descends to Queen's Road East. The street is noted for its historical landmarks – most notably the Blue House and Wan Chai Pak Tai Temple.

== History ==
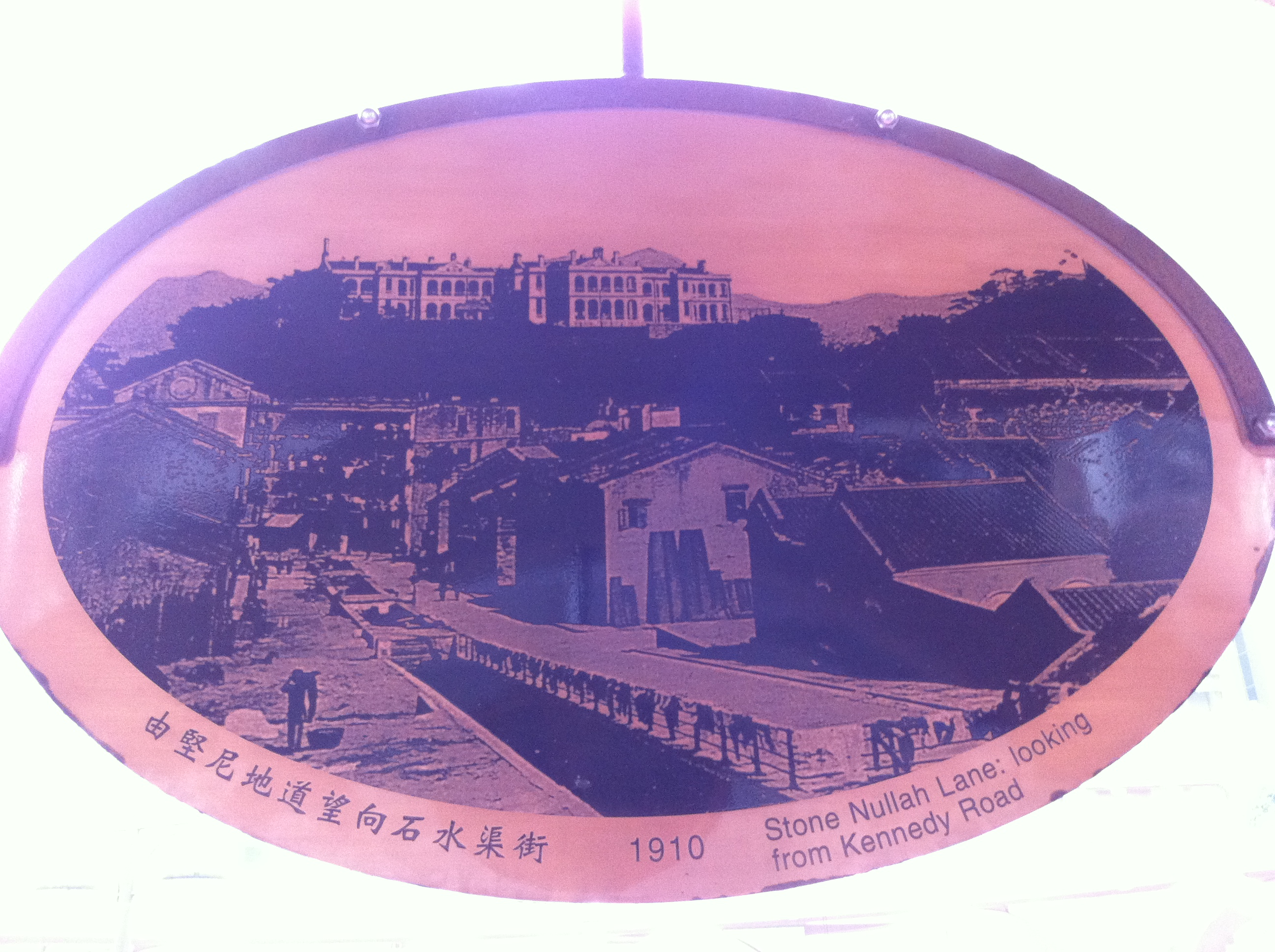
Stone Nullah Lane in 1910, with the eponymous nullah in the centre of the street (the Royal Naval Hospital is in the background)

During the First Opium War, the British occupied Hong Kong in 1841; the following year, the territory was ceded to them under the Treaty of Nanking. At the time, a nullah or water channel fashioned from stone was located on the street. Just as was the case with Water Street, the nullah carried spring water from Victoria Peak, situated above Kennedy Road, down to Victoria Harbour. The structure eventually lent its name to the street it was built on, and residents frequently used the nullah to wash their laundry.

At the start of the 20th century, shops which processed soybeans were established near Stone Nullah Lane. The unpleasant odour emitted during the process led to protests from residents in the neighbourhood, resulting in the shops relocating elsewhere. The nullah, which also emitted a foul stench, was culverted in 1959, and water from The Peak continues to flow through the subterranean channel to this day. The street's name is a reminder of the nullah's continued (albeit hidden) existence.

== Description and features ==
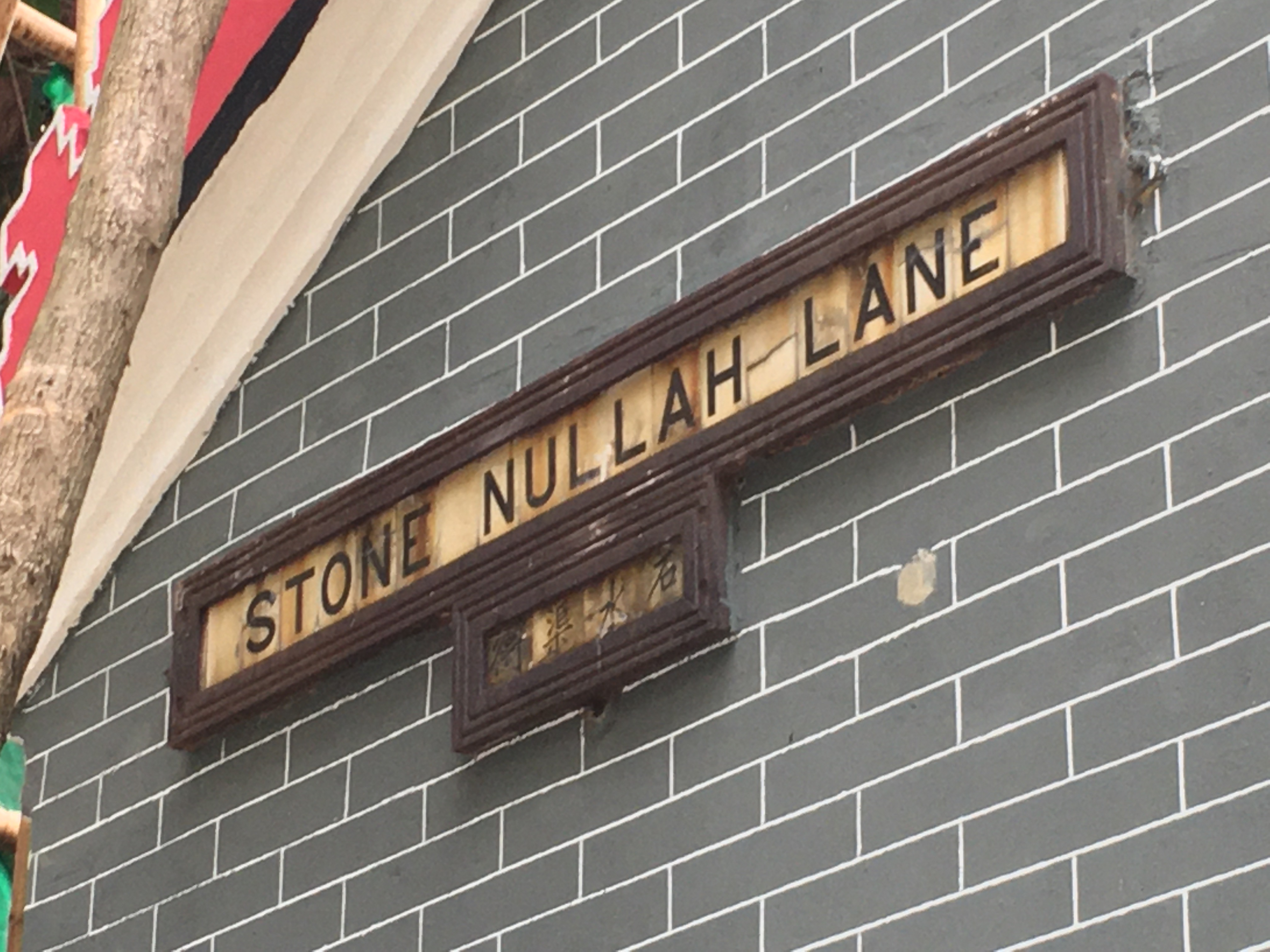
Antique street nameplate

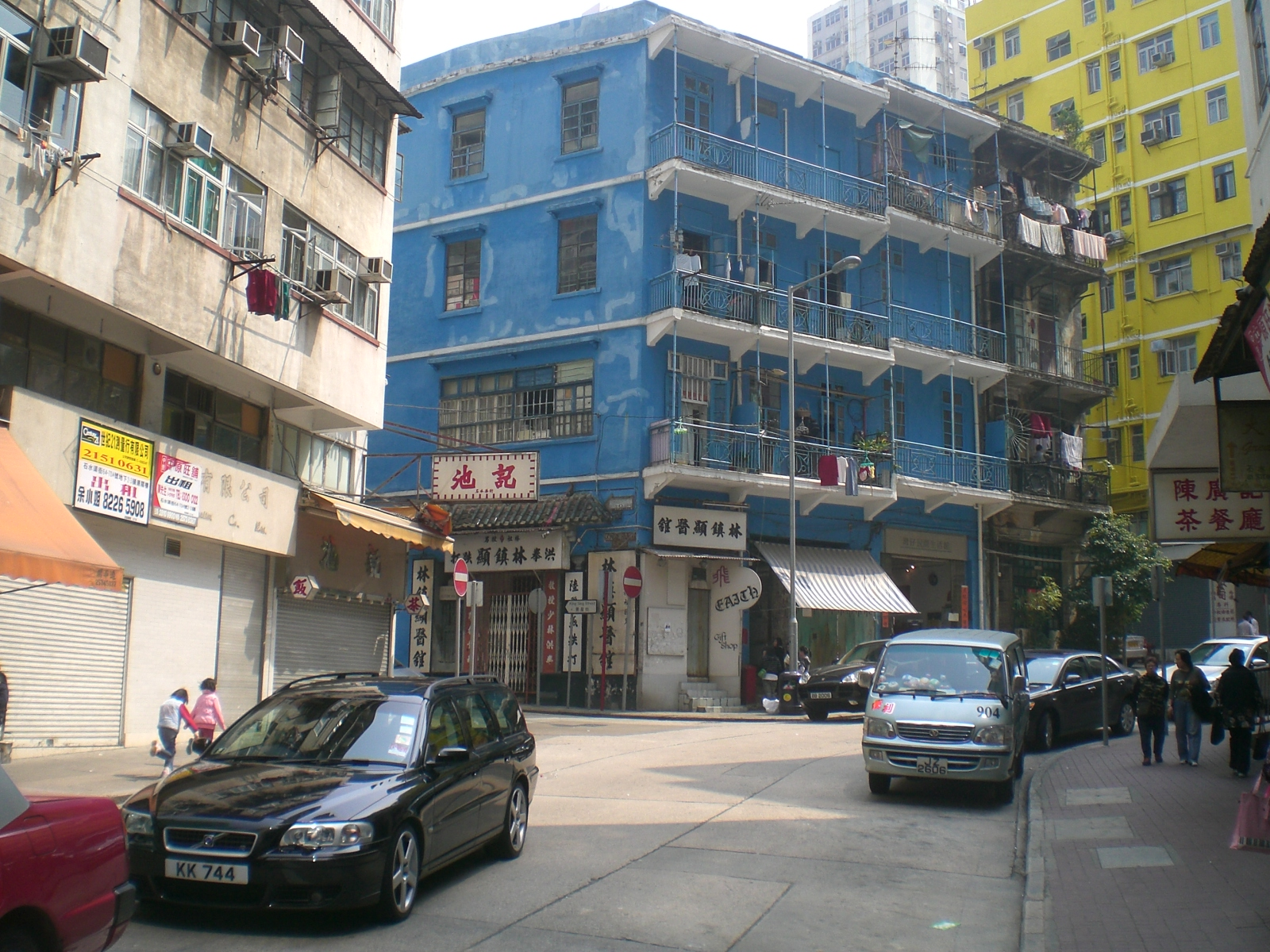
The iconic Blue House is located on the corner of Stone Nullah Lane and King Sing Street.

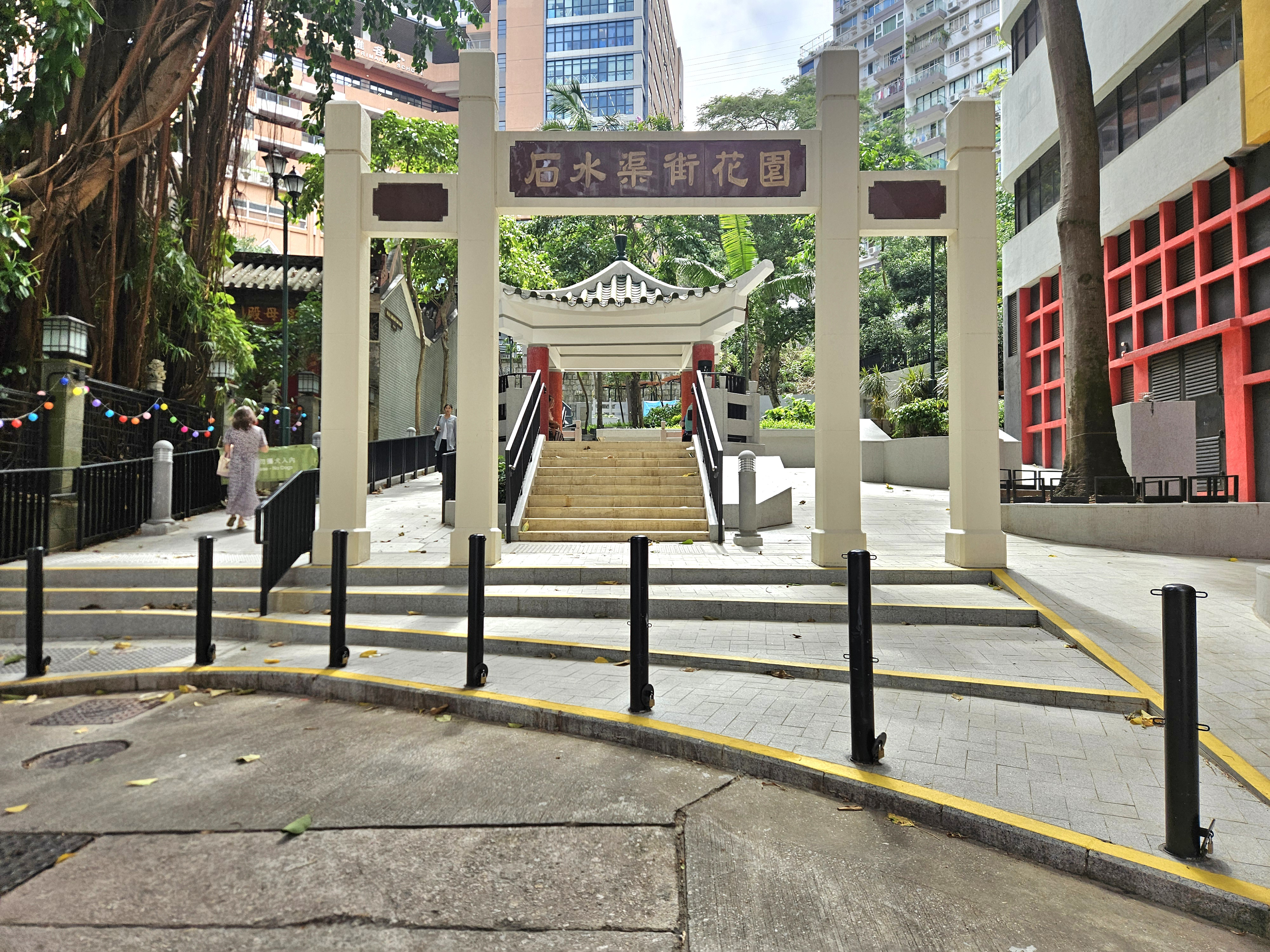
Stone Nullah Lane Garden, situated on the corner of Lung On Street and Stone Nullah Lane, with Wan Chai Pak Tai Temple located on the left, and the St. James' Settlement on the right.

The southern tip of Stone Nullah Lane is located on the corner of Lung On Street – this is where the Wan Chai Pak Tai Temple is located. Made from grey-coloured brick and granite, the temple was constructed in 1863, although the statue of Pak Tai inside dates as far back as 1604. The temple is the oldest in the district, and reportedly the largest on Hong Kong Island. The next landmark on the route is the headquarters of St. James' Settlement. Situated at 85 Stone Nullah Lane, the charitable organisation was established in 1949 with the goal of helping impoverished children who were living in squats around the neighbourhood, and now extends its services to needy people across the city. The current structure towers 12 storeys above the lane. Before the street reaches its terminus at the junction with Queen's Road East, it passes the Blue House, a Grade I historic building. The building—whose Spanish balconies made from cast-iron have elicited comparisons to those in New Orleans—was built in the 1920s as a tenement block which housed a dit da clinic, and a kung fu school from the 1950s to the 1960s, and currently has a public exhibition space on the ground floor. The remainder of the building continues to serve its original purpose as a residential block.

Together with Lung On Street, Stone Nullah Lane is unique in that it has no direct vehicular access, as its northern tip is one-way only, with the result that traffic emerging from the lane can join Queen's Road East, but not vice versa.

Therefore, vehicles wishing to access Stone Nullah Lane are obliged to turn into Kennedy Street from Queen's Road East, and then turn again into Kat On Street whence they can either turn left to reach the southern tip of Stone Nullah Lane (and thence Lung On Street) or turn right to access Stone Nullah Lane proper. Indeed, the junction of Kat On Street with Stone Nullah Lane is the only section of the lane in which traffic may travel in either direction.

A flight of stairs extending from Stone Nullah Lane Garden provides pedestrian access to Kennedy Road.

== See also ==
- Wan Chai Heritage Trail
