= St. James' Settlement (Hong Kong) =

NGO in Hong Kong

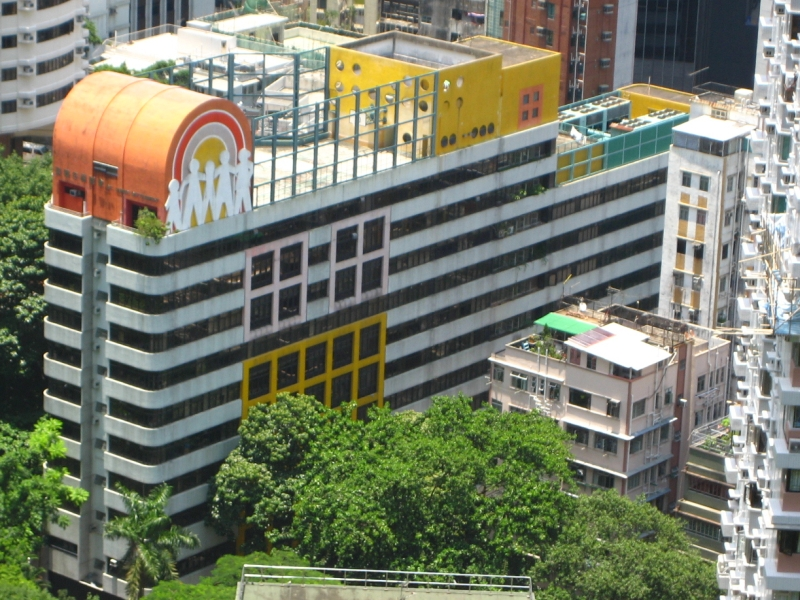
- St. James' Settlement headquarters.
- Company type: Non-profit organisation
- Industry: Charity
- Founded: 1949
- Headquarters: 85 Stone Nullah Lane, Wan Chai, Hong Kong
- Website: sjs.org.hk
- Footnotes / references Headquarter Rehabus Service Elderly Canteen

St. James' Settlement (SJS; Chinese: 聖雅各福群會) is a non-governmental charitable organisation in Hong Kong. It provides continuing care, family and counselling, rehabilitation, youth and community centre services. It aims at helping the needy to cope with social challenges. It has a wide range of beneficiaries, from children, teenagers, the elderly to the minority groups such as the mentally disabled and the East Asian Expatriate.

== Background ==
=== History ===
St. James' Settlement was founded by the Rt. Rev. Bishop R.O. Hall of the Anglican Church as a club for children in 1949. The club was originally operated in the temple of Northern King in Stone Nullah Lane, Wanchai. In 1963, it was rebuilt to a six-storey building and started to extend its service group to teenagers, the elderly and those with mental health problems. In 1987, Eastern Clinic and the office of the Civil Defence Corps were rebuilt to today's headquarter of the St. James' Settlement in Stone Nullah Lane. It is a multi-service community centre and the scope of services was further extended. After the Central and Western District Elderly Community Center was opened in 1991, different service centres developed and located along the North coast of Hong Kong Island. Currently, there are more than 20 service units in Hong Kong Island, Kowloon and New Territories with over 800 staff in the organisation.

== Funding ==
There are various channels for St. James' Settlement to collect funds.

1. Subsidization from the Hong Kong Sheng Kung Hui (Anglican Church)
2. Government subsidisation
3. Lotteries Fund
4. Grants
5. Dues and fees
6. Investment and Interests
7. Other Income
8. Donations from organisations in Hong Kong, for example:
  1. The Community Chest of Hong Kong
  2. Hong Kong Jockey Club Charities Trust
9. Donations from individuals in Hong Kong and overseas, in the following forms
  1. Residues of inheritance
  2. Part of inheritance
  3. Transference of specific property or wealth
  4. Listing the organisation as the beneficiary of life insurance policy
  5. General donations (can be once-for-all donation or regular donation)

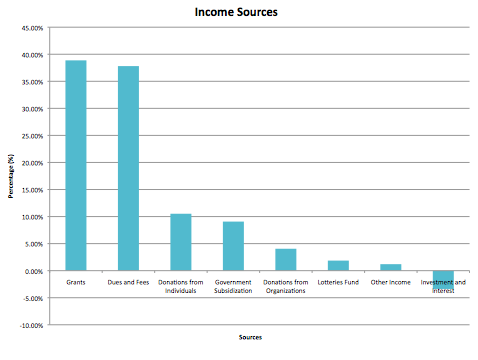

In the financial year 2008–2009, the organisation generated income of $339,484,185.14 and the dominant income sources are from Grants and Dues and fees and the organisation has a 3.38% reduce in income from Investments and interest.

== Executive committee ==
As of 2025:

- President: The Most Revd. Andrew Chan
- Chairman: David Li
- Vice-Chairman: Mr. Brian Li Man Bun,
- Honorary Treasurer: Mr. John R. Budge
- Honorary Secretary: Mr. Robert E. McBain
- Chaplain: Revd. Christine Ho Kit Ying
- Members: Mr. David Au Chi Wai, Dr. Andrew Chan Ping Chiu, Ms. Vena Cheng Wei Yan, Mr. Chiu Koon G, Mr. Clifford K. Chiu, Revd. Matthias Clement Tze-wo Der, Dr. Susan Ho Suk San, Dr. Lam Kui-Chun, Mrs. Patricia Lau, Mr. Billy Leung Kam Man, Dr. Edward Leung Man Fuk, Ms. Terese Wong
