= Ethiopian Manifesto =

1829 pamphlet by Robert Alexander Young

The Ethiopian Manifesto, Issued in Defence of the Black Man’s Rights in the Scale of Universal Freedom was a pamphlet issued in New York by Robert Alexander Young early in 1829, only months before David Walker's much more influential Appeal. Little is known about the author, who was an obscure Black New Yorker who likely served as a popular preacher among the working class.

In it the author envisioned the coming of a Black messiah. It contains one of the earliest extent calls for the reassembling of the African "race", of their need to become a people, a nation in themselves. He makes no distinction between African people throughout the world; for him, they are all African, regardless of their place of birth. Pan-negroism (or Pan-Africanism) was a first principle of his brand of nationalism.

"Ethiopia" is not a reference to the modern country so named, but to the entirety of African people, wherever they may be located. He speaks of a messiah, from Grenada. Born of an Afro-Carriacouan mother, this messiah, though Black, would be light-skinned. If some person was in mind as a model for this messiah, he has not been identified. This messiah was to lead the self-redemption of all African peoples ("Ethiopians").

Young notes the content of Psalm 68:31: "Princes shall come out of Egypt; Ethiopia shall soon stretch out her hands unto God" (King James version). Young states:

[W]e tell you of a surety, the decree hath already passed the judgment seat of an undeviating God, wherein he hath said, "surely hath the cries of the black, a most persecuted people, ascended to my throne and craved my mercy; now, behold! I will stretch forth mine hand and gather them to the palm, that they become unto me a people, and I unto them their God."

No major nineteenth-century Black thinkers refer to the Manifesto, so its influence, if any, remains to be determined.

== Text of the Manifesto ==
The Manifesto is included in several document collections, such as The ideological origins of Black nationalism, by Sterling Stuckey.
