= Gouw =

Gouw is a surname. Notable people with the surname include:

- Alex Gouw (also known as Gouw Hiap Kian), Southeast Asian tycoon, owner of property and investment enterprise Goldig Investment. Founded Asian movie empire Goldig Films in the 1960s, whose employees and contract artists include Ni Kuang., and Chow Yun-fat. He was a movie financier and executive producer.
- Carl Gouw, son of Southeast Asian tycoon Alex Gouw, Hong Kong businessman, award-winning property developer, founder and director of cultural institutions and charities, writer and artist.
- Cynthia Gouw (born 1963), American actress and news anchor
- Ian Gouw (born 1997), Hong Kong actor, model and musician
- Julia S. Gouw, American businesswoman
- Therisa Gouw, Indonesian-born American billionaire venture capitalist and entrepreneur. In 2025, Forbes described Gouw as America's first billionaire female venture capitalist. She co-founded the early-stage firm Aspect Ventures in 2014 and later co-founded Acrew Capital in 2019.

== See also ==
- Jessica De Gouw, Australian actress
- Van der Gouw
- Gouws
- Wu, a Chinese surname sometimes romanised as Gouw
