= Nam Koo Terrace =

Nam Koo Terrace 南固臺
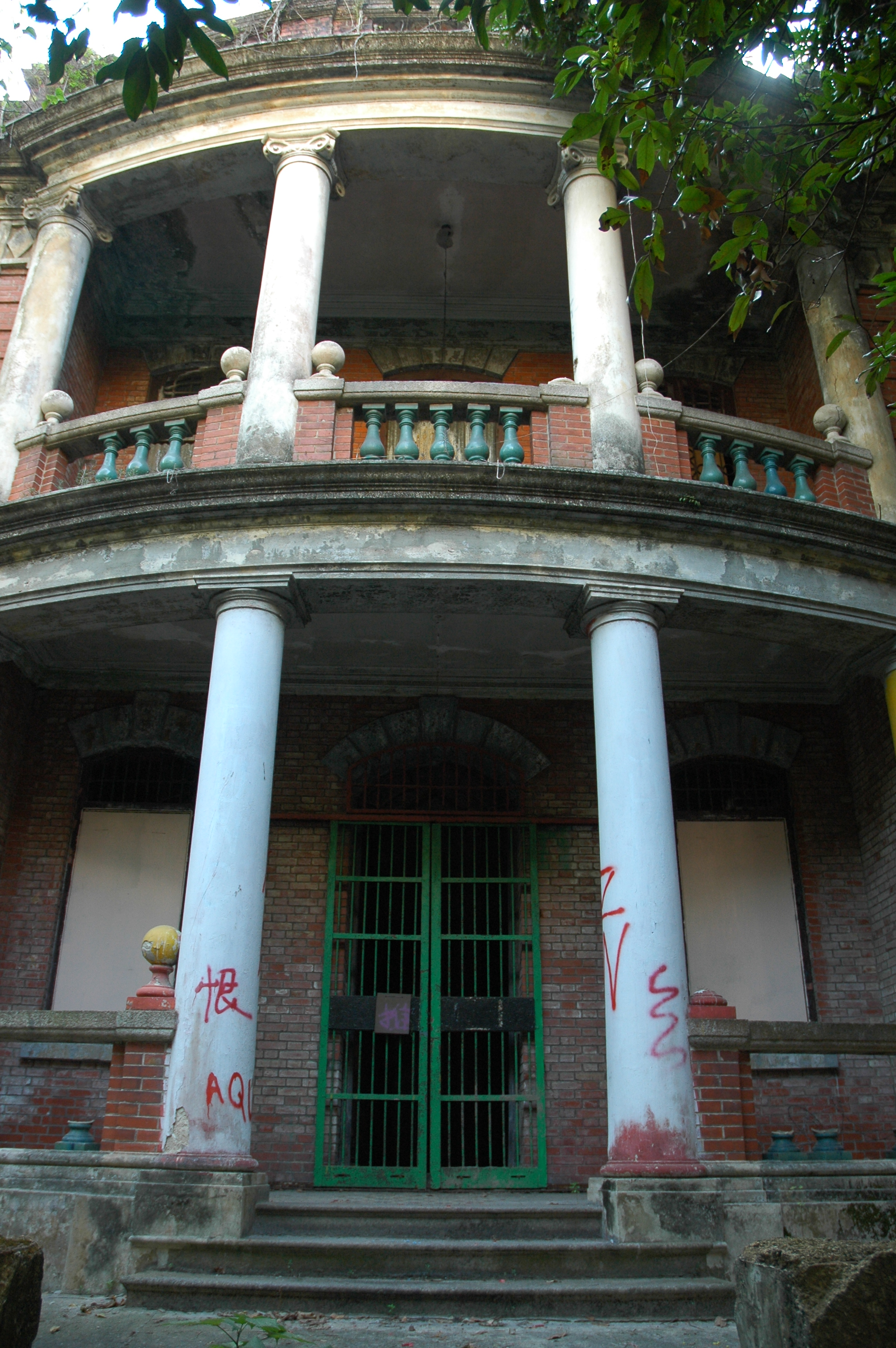
- Interactive map of the Nam Koo Terrace 南固臺 area

General information
- Type: House
- Architectural style: Colonial Eclectic
- Location: No. 55 Ship Street (船街), Wan Chai, Hong Kong
- Coordinates: 22.2749°N 114.1698°E
- Construction started: c.1915-1921
- Governing body: Hopewell Holdings

Hong Kong Graded Building – Grade I

Technical details
- Floor area: 200 square metres (2,200 sq ft)

Nam Koo Terrace
- Traditional Chinese: 南固臺
- Simplified Chinese: 南固台
Transcriptions
Standard Mandarin
- Hanyu Pinyin: Nán Gù Tái
Yue: Cantonese
- Yale Romanization: Nàahm gu tòih
- Jyutping: Naam4 gu3 toi4

Nam Koo Terrace is a Grade I Historic Building located at No. 55 Ship Street, Wan Chai, Hong Kong, popularly known as "The Wan Chai Haunted House". The building is currently owned by Hopewell Holdings, a large property development company based in Hong Kong.

== History ==
The two-storey red brick building was built in c.1915-1921 and owned by a wealthy Shanghai merchant family by the name of To (杜).

Prominent Hong Kong businessman To Chun-man (杜仲文) first leased the land lot where the building now stands in 1915. At this stage To Chun-man held the position of Chief Chinese Silks Salesman (專理紗羅綢緞員) for Wing On Company Limited (永安有限公司), although he was later promoted to Assistant Manager (副司理). He also held several posts in various community committees including that of Secretary (司理) for the Commercial Chamber of The Heung Shan District (香邑僑商會所), and was a member of The Chinese General Chamber of Commerce (華商總會).

However, To Chun-man was forced to evacuate the mansion at the onset of the Japanese occupation of Hong Kong, and he died soon after his return. It is said that during the occupation, Nam Koo Terrace was used as a military brothel or "comfort house (慰安所)" for the Japanese soldiers from 1941 to 1945. Many other properties within the Wan Chai area were also used as brothels by the Japanese military during this period, including St. Luke's College and neighbouring Tung Chi College.

Nam Koo Terrace continued to remain under the ownership of the To family until 1988, when the property was sold to YUBA Co. Ltd.

Hopewell Holdings took over ownership of the building in 1993, which was initially acquired to be demolished in order to make way for their Mega Tower hotel project (Hopewell Centre II). However, the site has stood vacant since then; despite the fact that the company's development proposal gained Government approval in 1994. While Hopewell Holdings remains the current proprietor of Nam Koo Terrace; recent public announcements indicate that their intentions have now shifted to the preservation of this historical site but does not have any concrete plans announced since 2008. See: Preservation

== Location ==
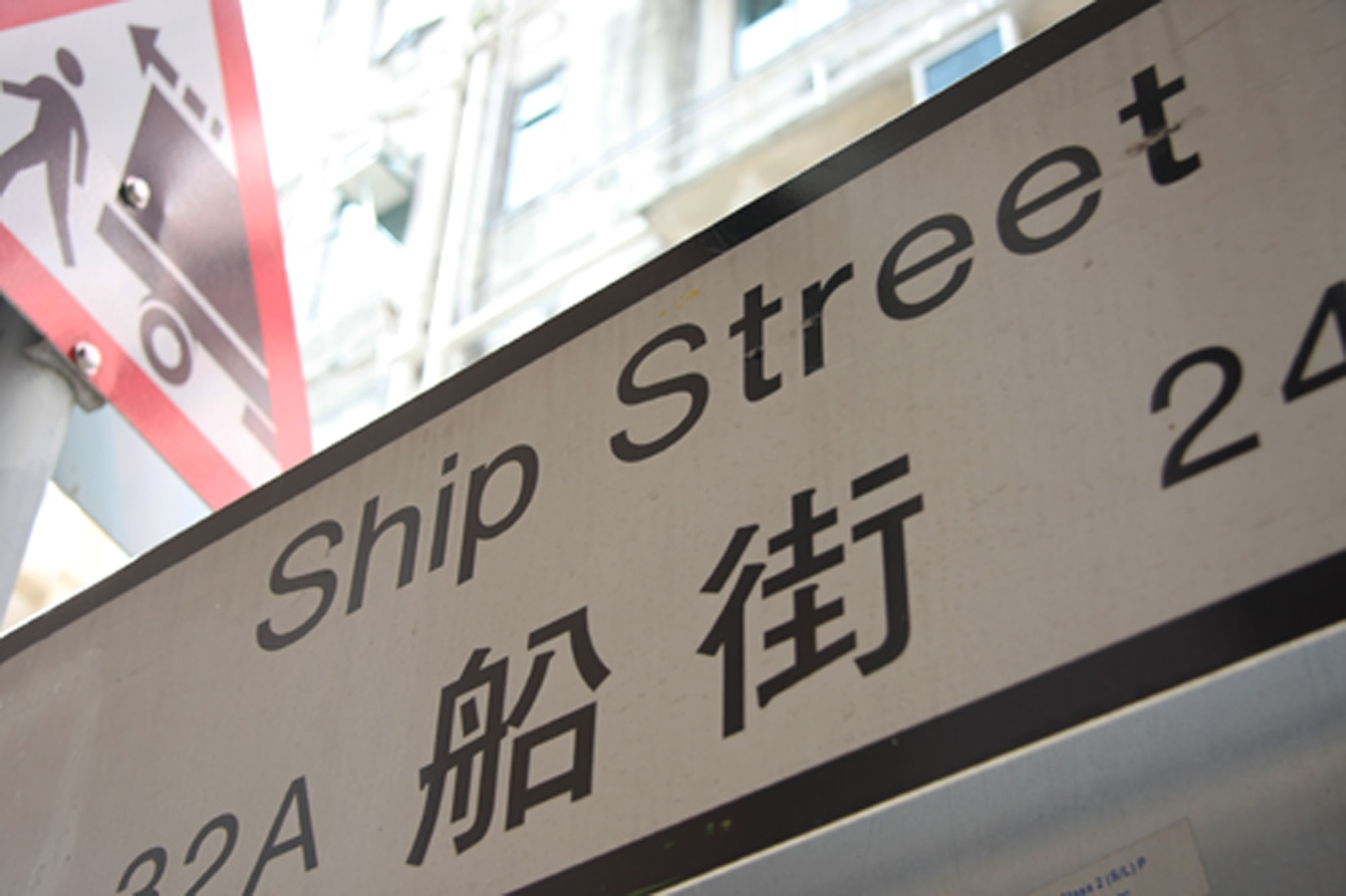
Ship Street (船街), Wan Chai, Hong Kong.

=== Wan Chai District ===
The Wan Chai district was one of the earliest developed areas on Hong Kong Island after the first land sale in 1841, where property lots were sold to various firms and individuals. The area soon became a hub of commerce and industry, closely linked with the shipping business along the waterfront during the 19th century. However, due to the acquisition of the Victoria Barracks by the military in the 1850s, the shipbuilding business began a steady decline and the district turned instead towards residential development.

By 1845, the Wan Chai area (dubbed 'Spring Garden Lane' (春園街) during this period after opium merchant John Dent's personal villa) had been transformed into an exclusive residential district for privileged European businessmen.

=== Neighbouring Heritage Sites ===
Geographically speaking, Nam Koo Terrace is in relatively close vicinity to several other properties ranked by the Antiquities Advisory Board. No. 18 Ship Street, the Blue House at Nos. 72-74A Stone Nullah Lane, Nos. 6, 8, 10 and 12 Burrows Street (石水渠街), Nos. 2, 4, 6, and 8 Hing Wan Street (慶雲街) as well as Nos. 1, 3, 5, 7, 9, & 11 Mallory Street (茂羅街) and Nos. 186, 188 & 190 Queen's Road East (皇后大道東) can all be found in the surrounding area. Other sites of heritage significance, such as the Hung Shing Temple on Nos. 129-131 Queen's Road East and Wan Chai Market (灣仔街市) on No.264 Queen's Road East, are also situated within the locality of Nam Koo Terrace.

Nam Koo Terrace is accessible from Exit B2 of the Wan Chai MTR station.

== Architecture ==
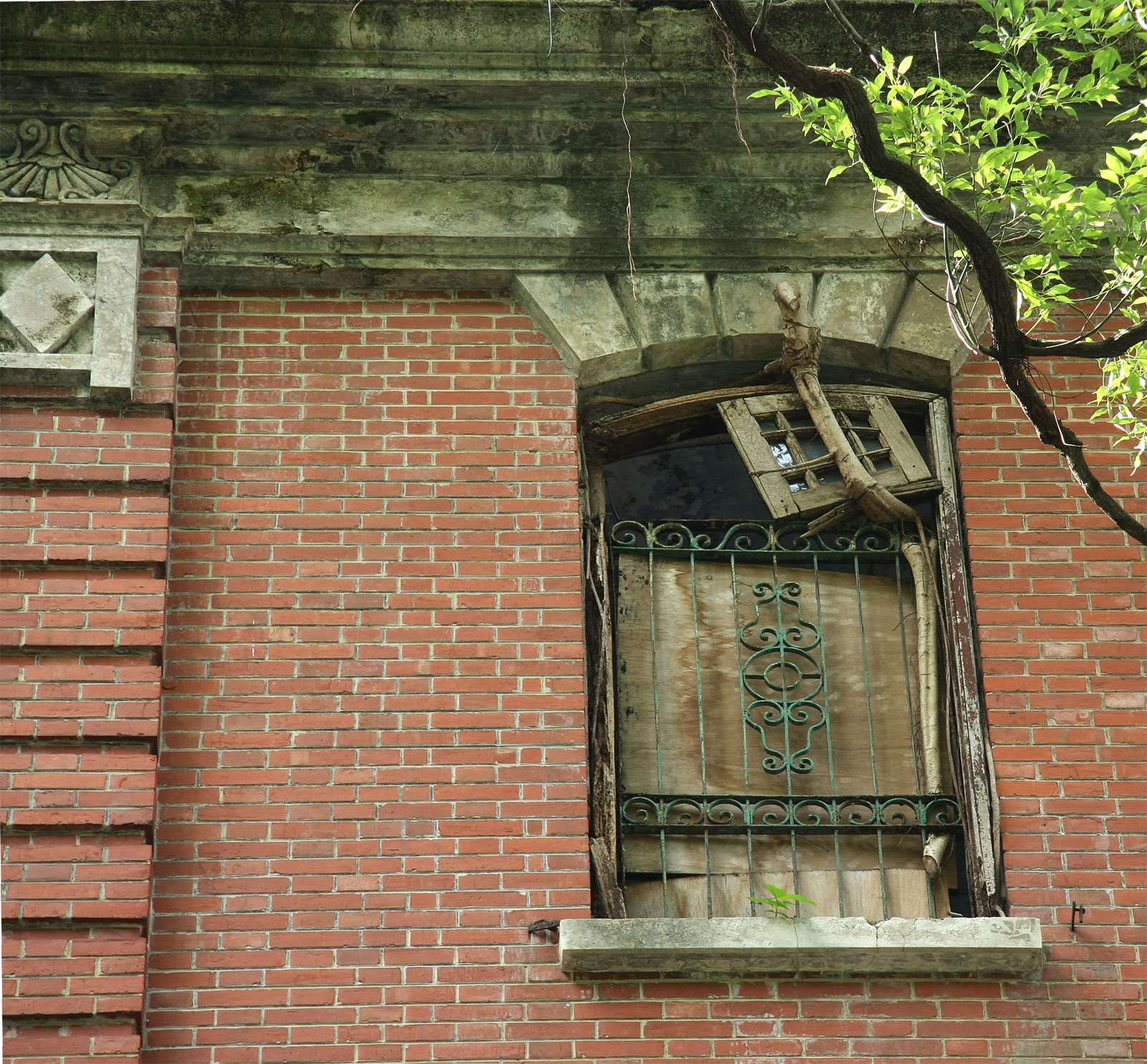
Red brickwork on outer wall and window grilles.

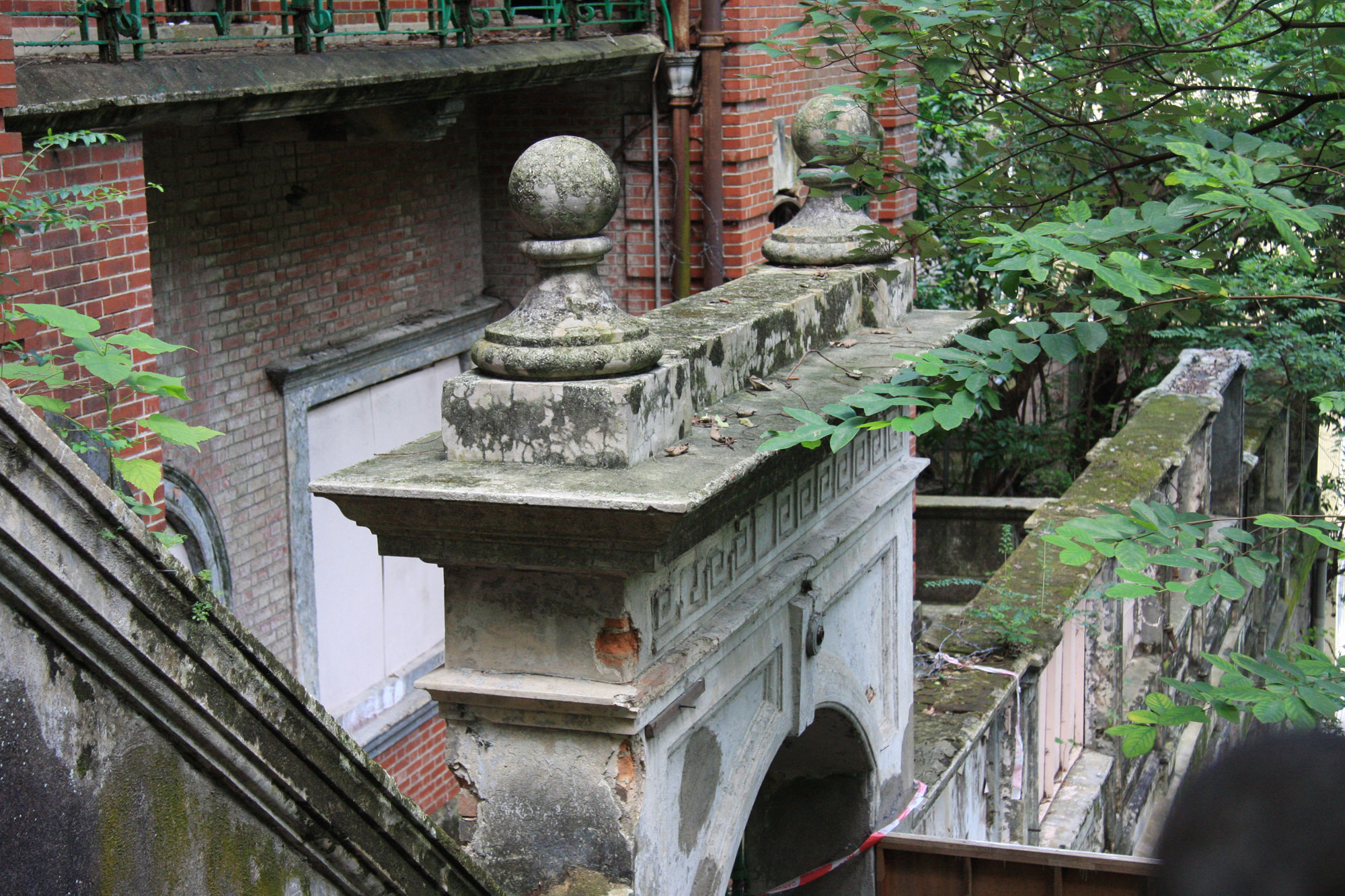
Classical Revival architectural features.

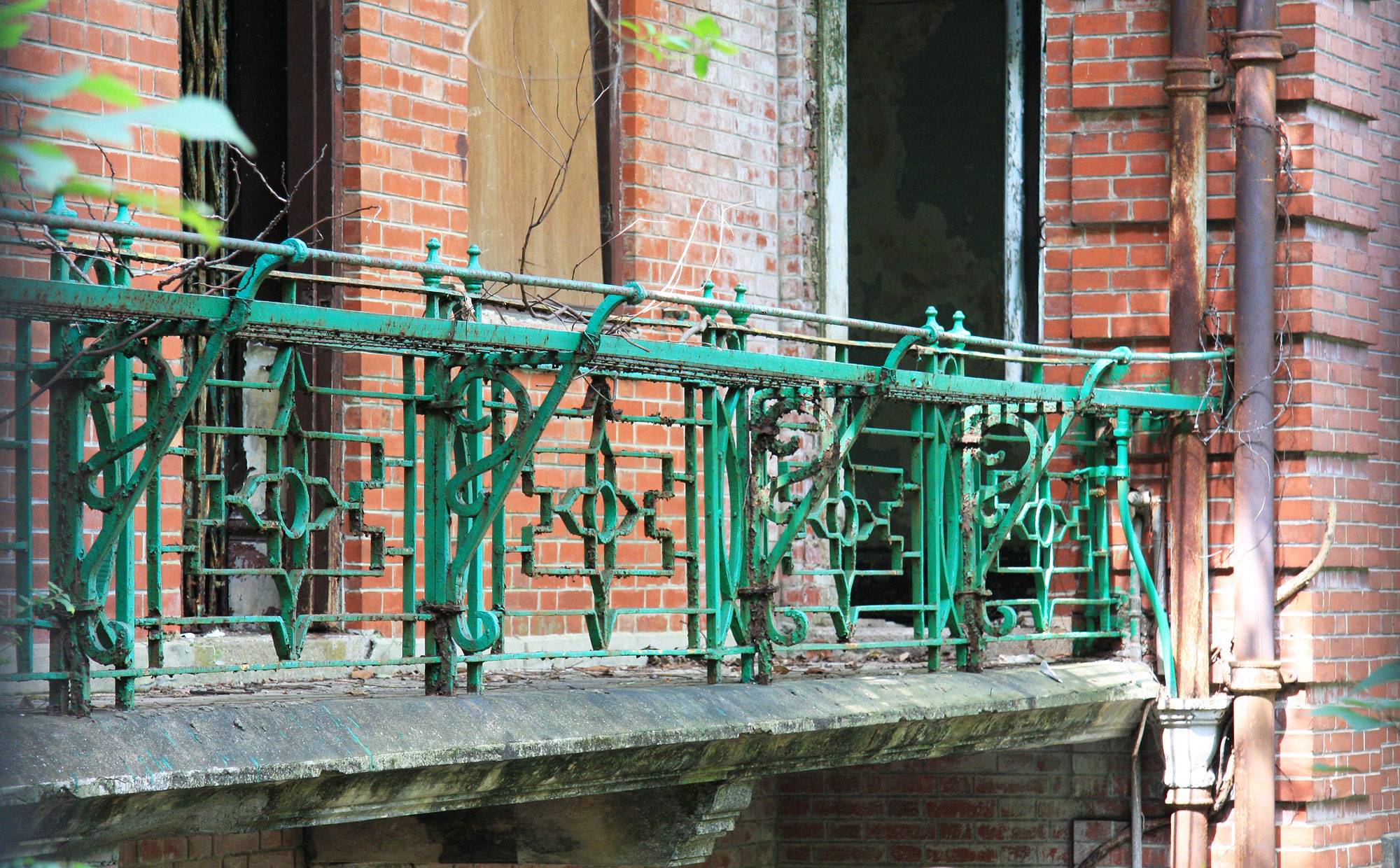
Balcony Ironwork.

Nam Koo Terrace is a site of significant cultural and architectural heritage stemming from Hong Kong's Colonial Era. The building was designed as a European-style house in the 1910s when large private lots on the hillside below Kennedy Road were sold for real estate development.

Nam Koo Terrace is a two-storey mansion, incorporating strong elements of both Eastern and Western architectural styles. As one of the more prominent villas in the Wan Chai District, Nam Koo Terrace covers over two hundred square meters of land. It is also referred to as the "red house" because the majority of the building's external wall is constructed from red bricks. Today, the building exists in a ruined state due to the effects of corrosion suffered during the Japanese invasion and ineffective preservation.

=== Design Features ===
As well as embracing the Colonial Eclectic style, Nam Koo Terrace also adopts Classical Revival and Italian Renaissance architectural features combined with traditional Chinese decorations and motifs. The red bricked outer wall of the building is considered to be one of the major features of its architectural construction. Besides the red brickwork; rusticated quoins, moulded cornices, and voussoired arches over the windows add to the uniqueness of the structure's architecture.

The use of ironwork for the window grilles, balconies and entrance gate also provides the building with a certain ornamental aesthetic.

The façade facing the garden at the front of the property is simple and symmetrical in design, and consists of a curved colonnaded porch and veranda similar to that of a temple portico. The Doric Order and Ionic Order are both incorporated in the building's standing columns; while the main entrance gate, which is situated adjacent to the Ship Street steps, applies a combination of Greek and Roman features. On the rooftop, a pavilion has been built in traditional Chinese style. This pavilion, in addition to the position of the entrance gate and the asymmetrical building plan, suggest the influence of Chinese feng shui was incorporated in the original construction design.

== Preservation ==
=== Historical Status ===
In 1996, Nam Koo Terrace received the status of a Grade I Historical Building from the Antiquities Advisory Board in light of its historical and architectural importance in Hong Kong. As no evident alterations have taken place within the structure, Nam Koo Terrace has managed to retain its authenticity and is now considered a building of notable cultural value. However, the historical significance of the site has not always been acknowledged by the local community, and has thus fallen into disrepair over the years. Serious neglect has ultimately left the building in sufficient need of renovation.

=== Antiquities and Monuments Ordinance ===
As a Grade I Historic Building, unpermitted demolition or excavation of the Nam Koo Terrace site is strictly prohibited by Section 6, Part 1 of the Antiquities and Monuments Ordinance (Cap.53); a legislative document administered by the Antiquities and Monuments Office under the management of the Home Affairs Bureau within the government's Leisure and Cultural Services Department:

"(1) Subject to subsection (4), no person shall-

(a) excavate, carry on building or other works, plant or fell trees or deposit earth or refuse on or in a proposed monument or monument; or
(b) demolish, remove, obstruct, deface or interfere with a proposed monument or monument,

except in accordance with a permit granted by the Authority. (Amended 38 of 1982 s. 7)"

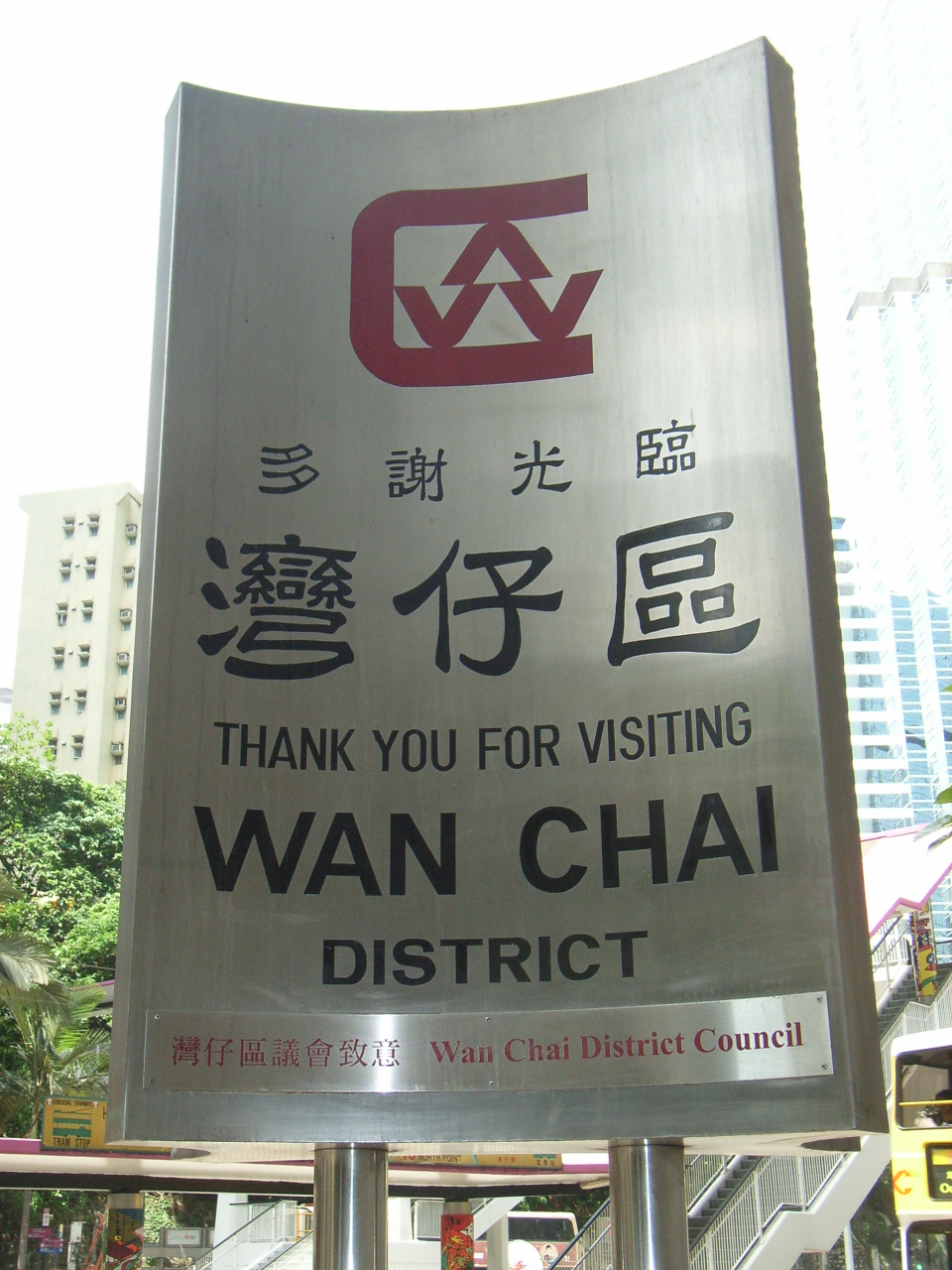
Wan Chai District.

=== Hopewell Centre II Development Plan ===
On 19 November 2008, Hopewell Holdings issued a press release stating that it will be revising the development plan of its Hopewell Centre II; aiming to achieve more of a balance between “economic development and environmental protection” in the new proposal. Currently the total investment budget for the new centre is to be around HK$5 billion which will encompass a HK$400 million road improvement plan, widespread tree planting and a public park. The company believes the project will considerably enhance Wan Chai's commercial value upon completion in 2016.

Since the 1970s, Hopewell Holdings has attained many old buildings in the district to use as sites for this redevelopment. Although Nam Koo Terrace was not specifically featured in the development plan approved by the Town Planning Board in 1994; the company has pledged to restore the historic site together with the new Hopewell Centre project. Mr. Thomas Wu, Co-Managing Director of Hopewell Holdings, has stated that:

"There is an increasingly strong voice in the society calling for the conservation of heritage buildings and historic sites in Hong Kong. Hopewell Holdings has heard their opinions and has plans to conserve and revitalise Nam Koo Terrace, a Grade I historic building with 90 years of history.”

=== Wan Chai Heritage Trail ===
Nam Koo Terrace is one of the initial 15 sites featured on the newly formed Wan Chai Heritage Trail, which was launched on 27 September 2009 by the Old Wan Chai Revitalisation Initiatives Special Committee (OWCRISC). The trail's aim is to encourage visitors to examine the architectural and historical diversity on display in one of Hong Kong's oldest districts.

== Folklore ==
Colloquially referred to as a 'Haunted House', the mansion has been attached with a certain conjectural element of mystery and esoteric connotation.

The 'ghosts' of women, who are said to have died in the time Nam Koo Terrace allegedly served as a Japanese military brothel; are claimed to have been witnessed at several different points in the building. Accounts of hearing cries and screams from these said comfort women, have long been circulated by the supernatural rumour mill and have subsequently furthered Nam Koo Terrace's reputation for being a place of paranormal interest.

People have also reported seeing "ghostly flames" in the house. However, as Nam Koo Terrace was frequented often by Hong Kong's squatting community, these apparitions were most likely the result of actual fires lit by local vagrants using the site for shelter.

On 30 November 2003, Oriental Daily, as well as many other local Hong Kong newspapers; covered a story about a group of eight middle school students who attempted to stay overnight on the Nam Koo Terrace property. It was said the students wanted to catch a glimpse of the supernatural 'ghosts' that have long been rumoured to reside in the historical building. According to the report, three of the female students were seen to have become emotionally unstable, claiming to have been assailed by a ghostly visitant. Later, police sent the three girls to hospital to receive psychiatric treatment. In the days following, local people in Hong Kong thronged to Nam Koo Terrace en masse and the house continued to dominate the headlines of daily newspapers for some time.

== Popular culture ==
Trademark, a German music trio, filmed the music video of their song I'll Be There For You in this house.

Jen Sookfong Lee’s 2025 novel, “A Hunger We Pass Down”, features the mansion prominently in the storyline.

== Gallery ==
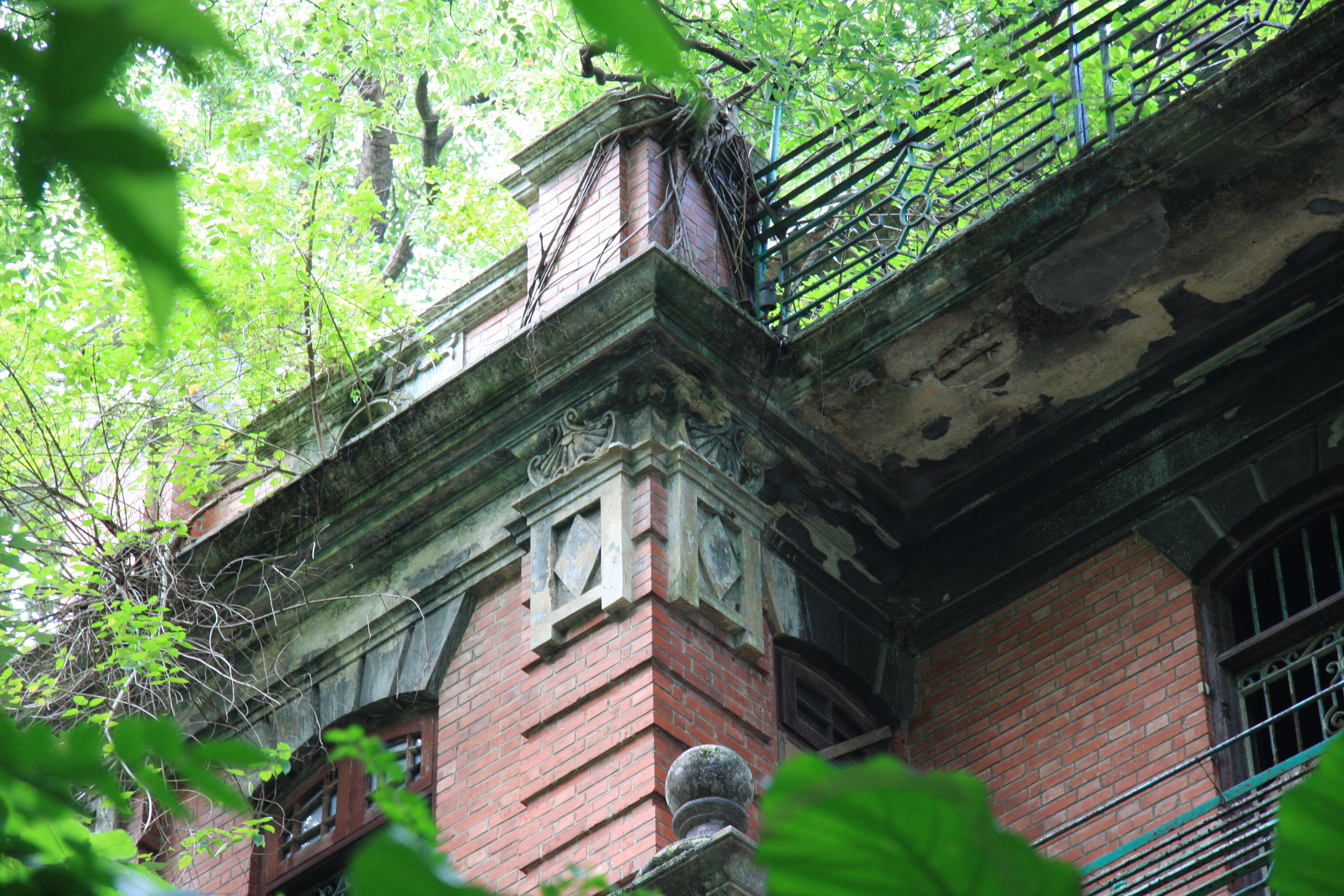
Corniced Roof Design

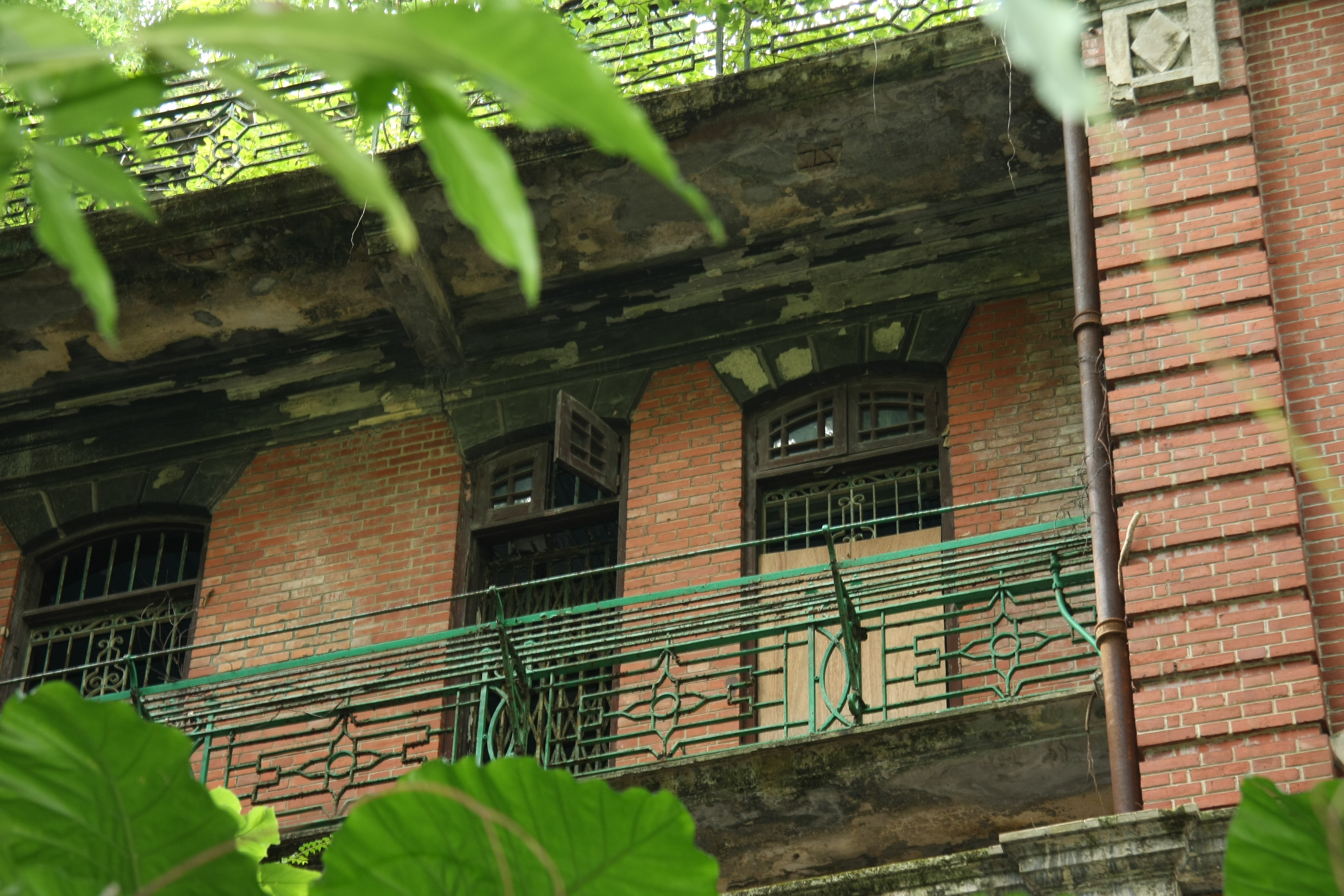
Second Storey Windows

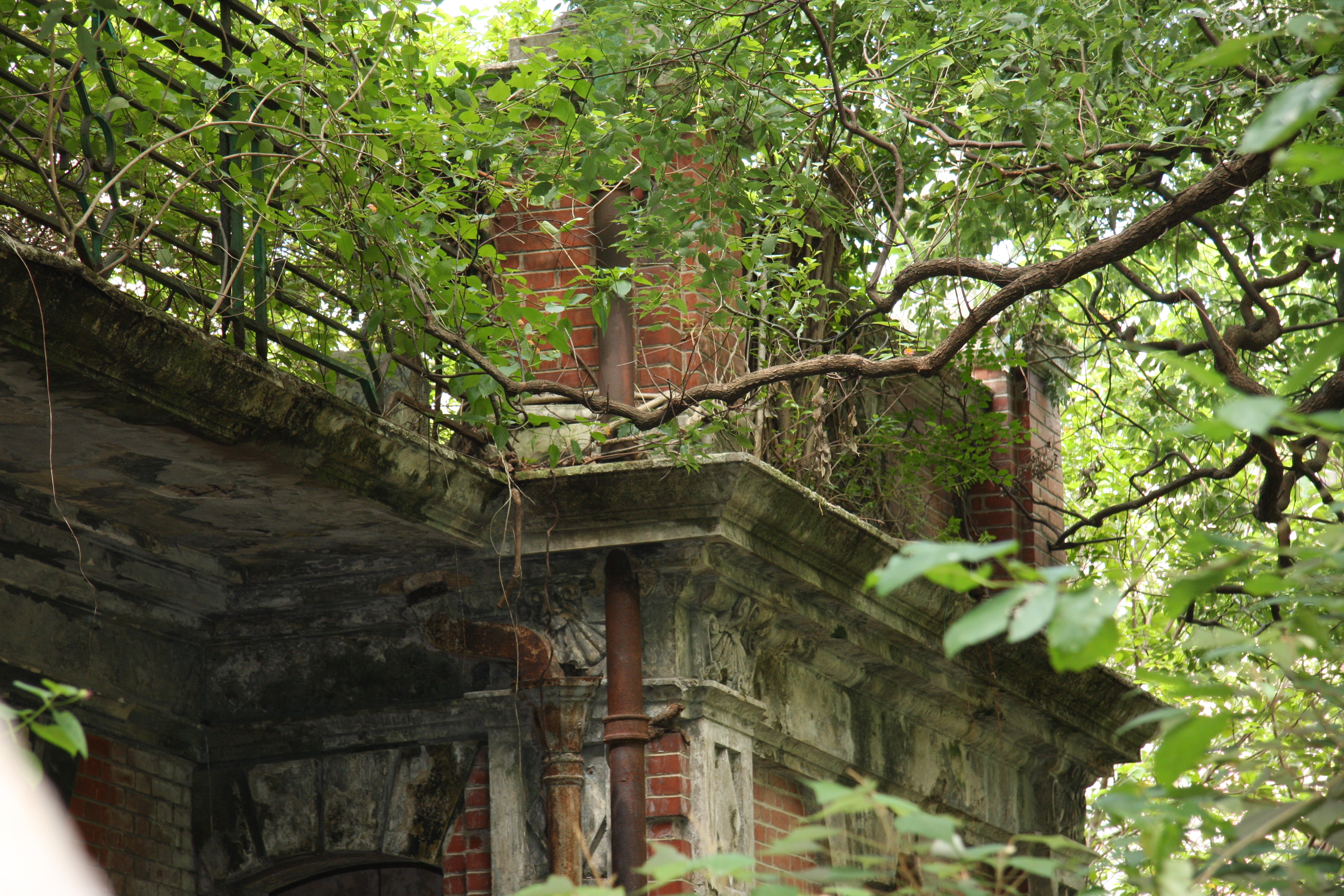
External View of the Building

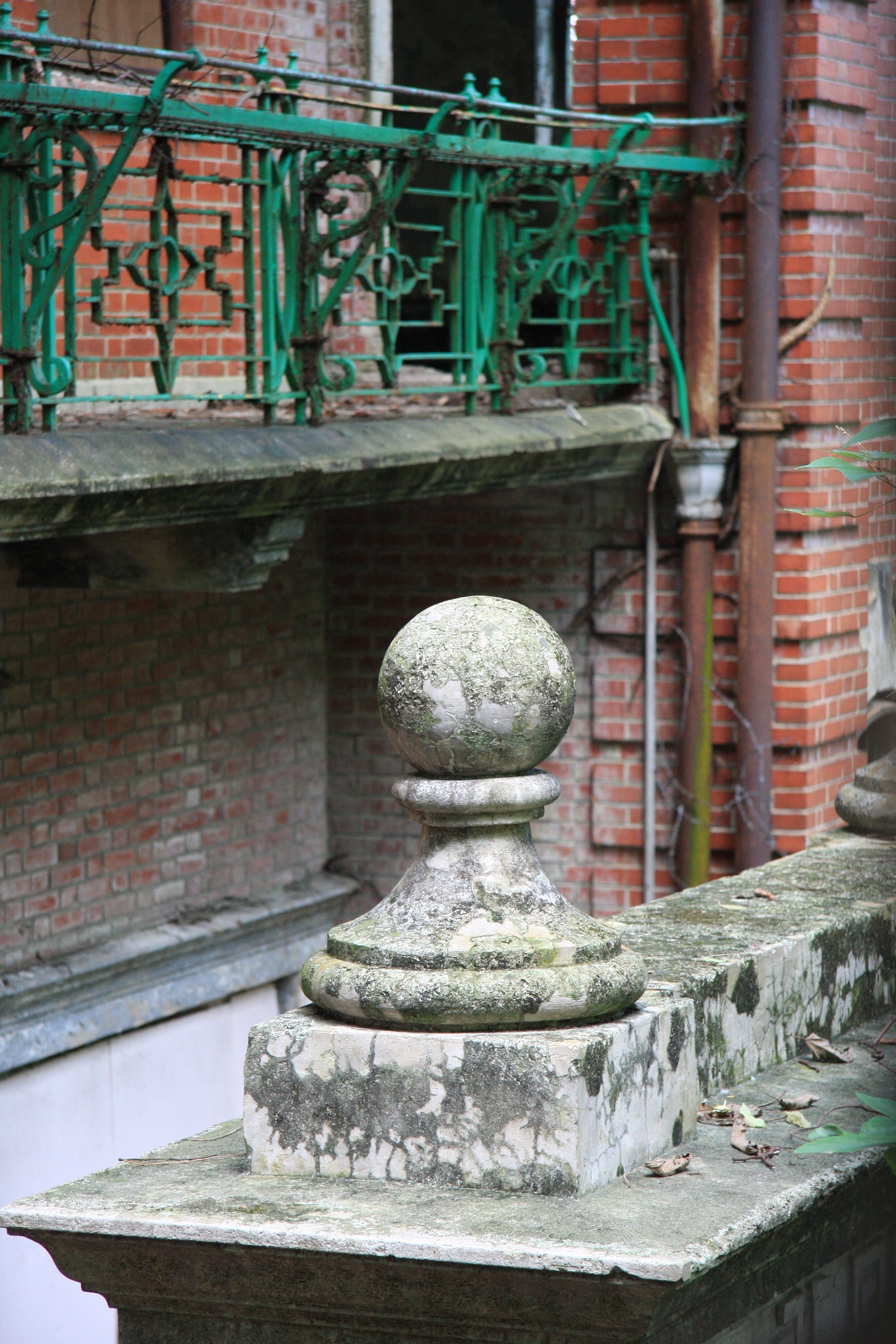
Architectural Ornamentation

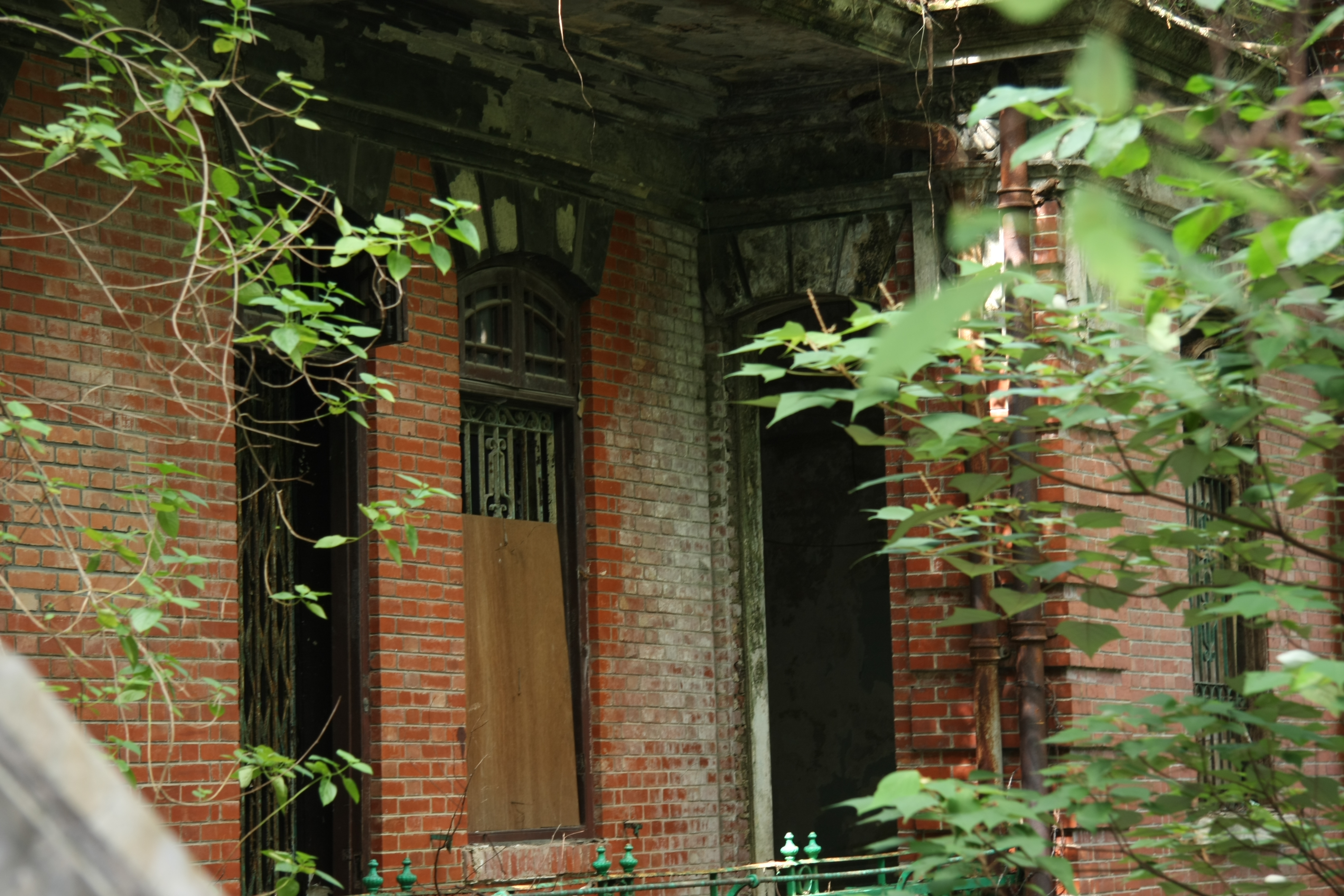
Second Storey Balcony

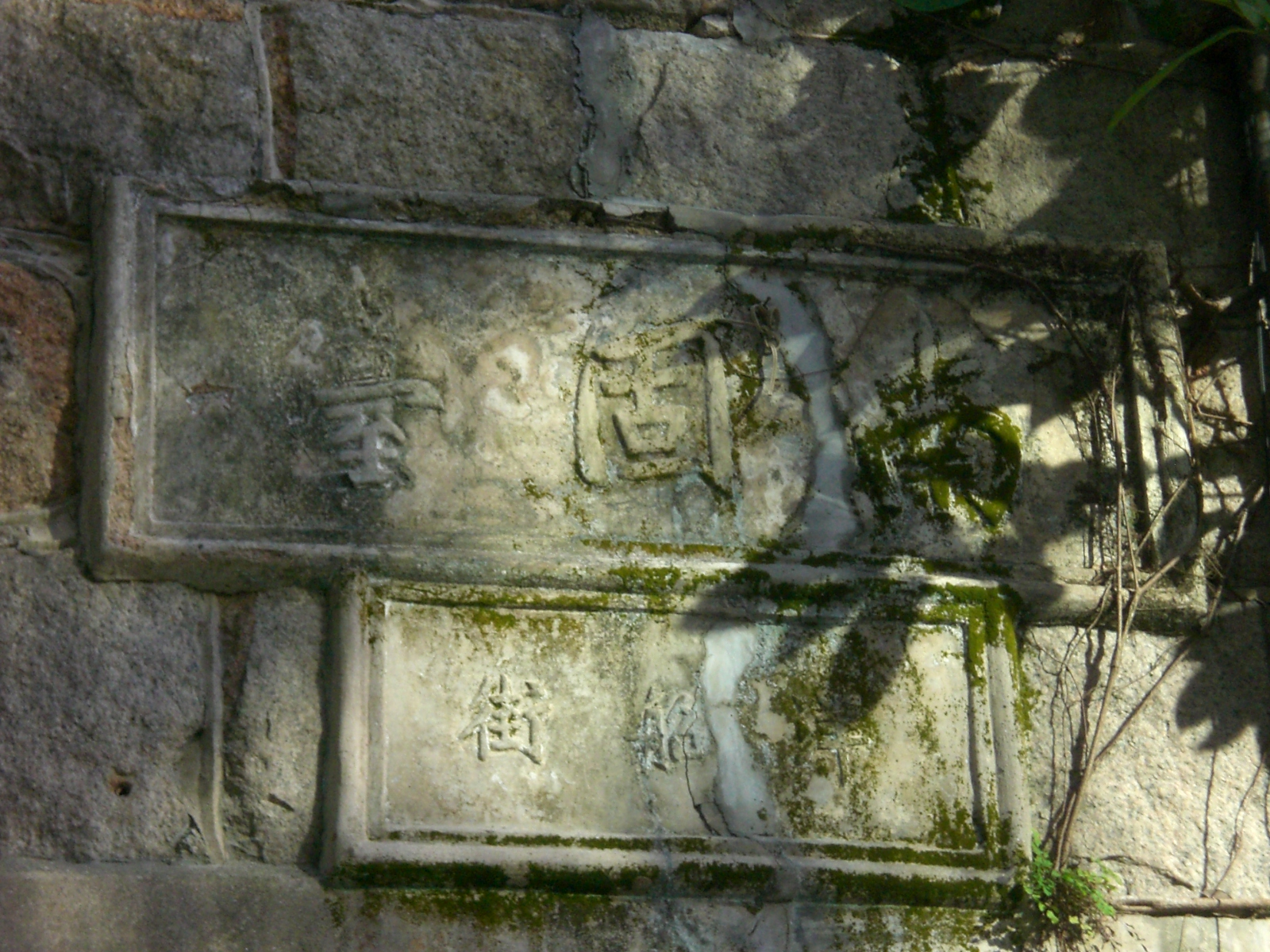
55 Ship Street Plaque

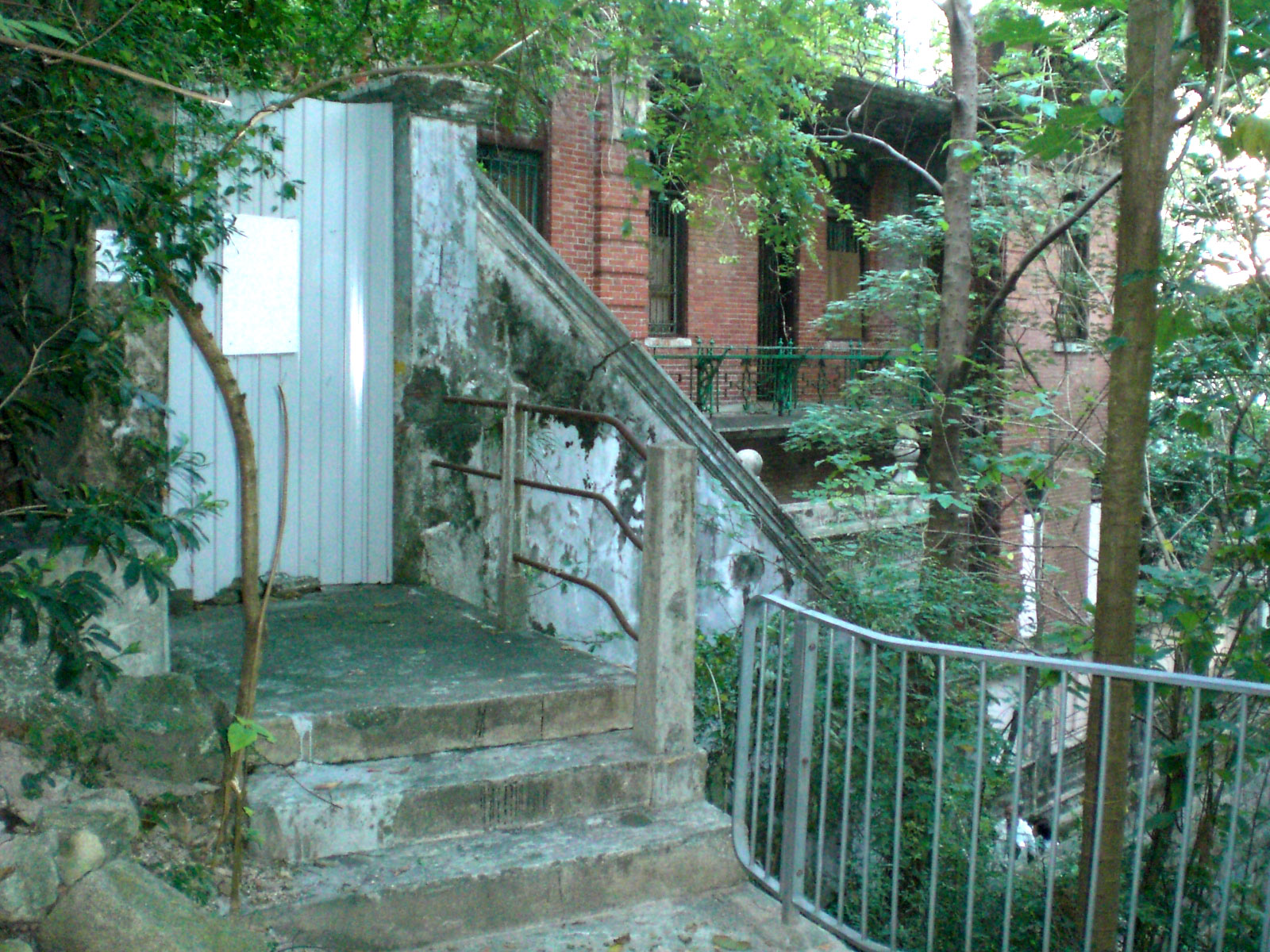
Property entrance barricaded from Ship Street steps

== See also ==
- List of Grade I historic buildings in Hong Kong
- History of Hong Kong
- Wan Chai
