= Ship Street, Hong Kong =

Street in Hong Kong

Coordinates: 22.276201°N 114.170927°E

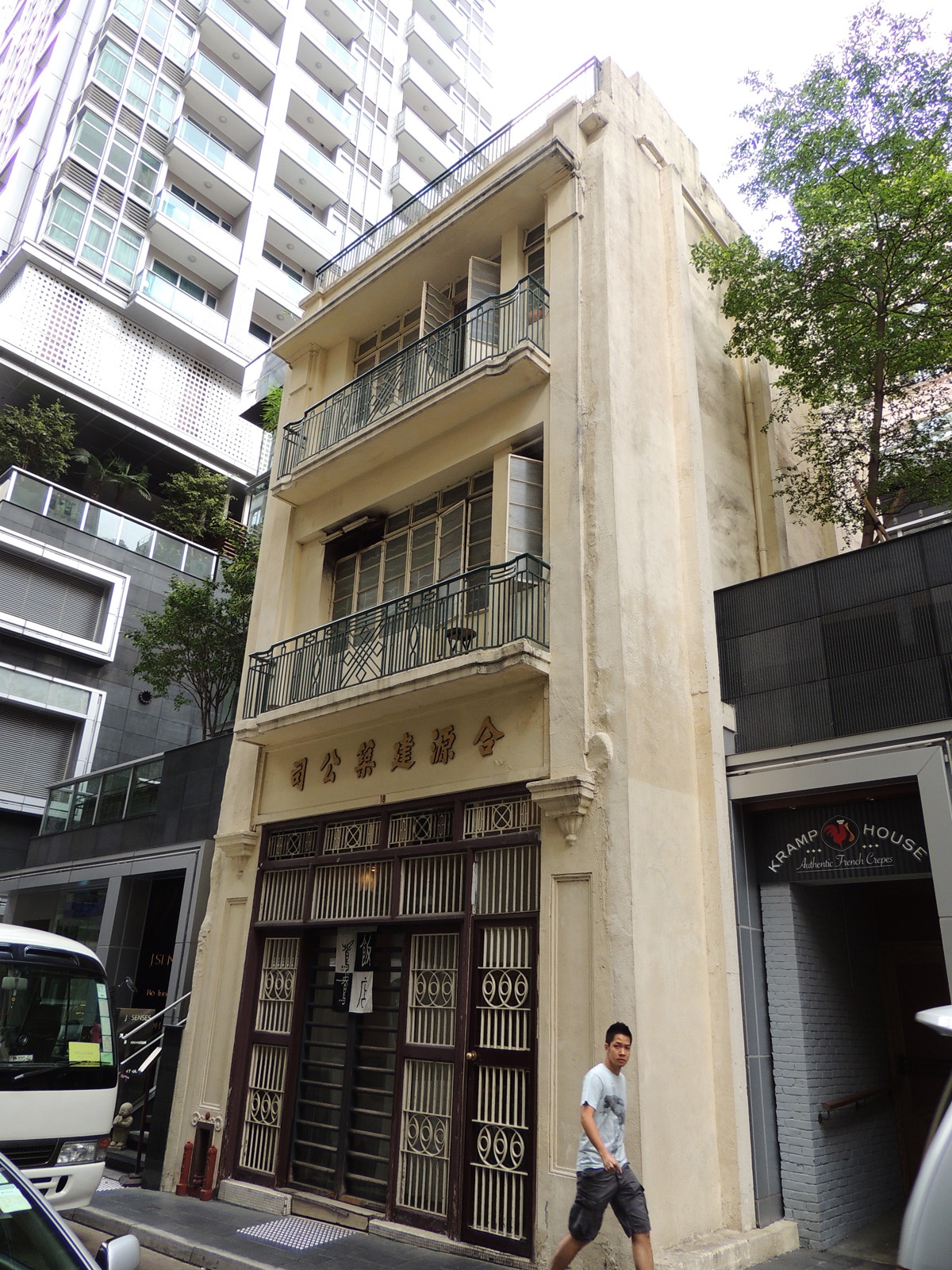
A cafe operated in an old Chinese building at No. 18 Ship Street. This building is a Tong-lau and a Grade II historic building.

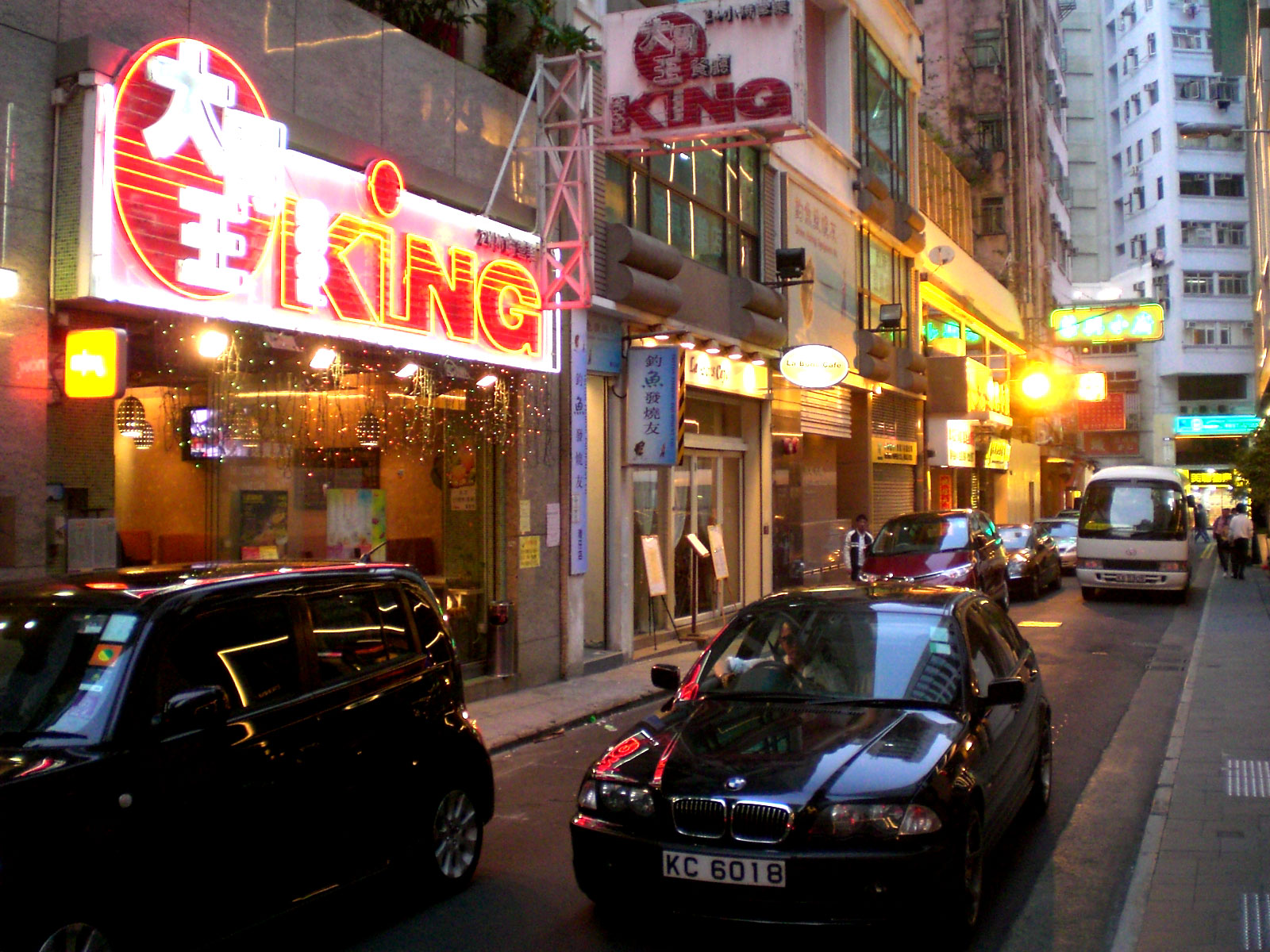
Ship Street, Wan Chai, Hong Kong

Ship Street (Chinese: 船街) is a street in Wan Chai, Hong Kong. It starts from Johnston Road, crosses Queen's Road East and goes uphill southward and reaches Kennedy Road. Part of the street is ladders and much of the century-old buildings are abandoned. Locals often refer to these buildings as the "Ghost House".

== History ==
The story of Ship Street began in 1910s. It was near the pier in Johnston Road and thus the roads and streets in surrounding are named after navigation and the ports in China. The original stone steps of the Ship Street are well-preserved among the rapid development of Hong Kong. Before the completion of Hopewell Centre in 1980s, the street was the preferred access among the students of surrounding schools like St. Francis' Canossian College and Tung Chi College (同濟中學).

== Future ==
The street is a featured street in Hong Kong and a venue for several films. Hopewell long planned a hotel project, Mega Tower Hotel at the east of the street but received opposition from the surrounding residents and environmental groups. It is because the project would also involve demolition of the historical building of the famous haunted house, Nam Koo Terrace (南固臺) and felling of various climbing fig trees. The lower part between Johnston Road and Queen's Road East is designated to become a pedestrianised street after the completion of a major Urban Renewal Authority project.

The hotel project has been recently modified. In the modified planning, Nam Koo Terrace would be preserved in the project.

== See also ==
- List of streets and roads in Hong Kong

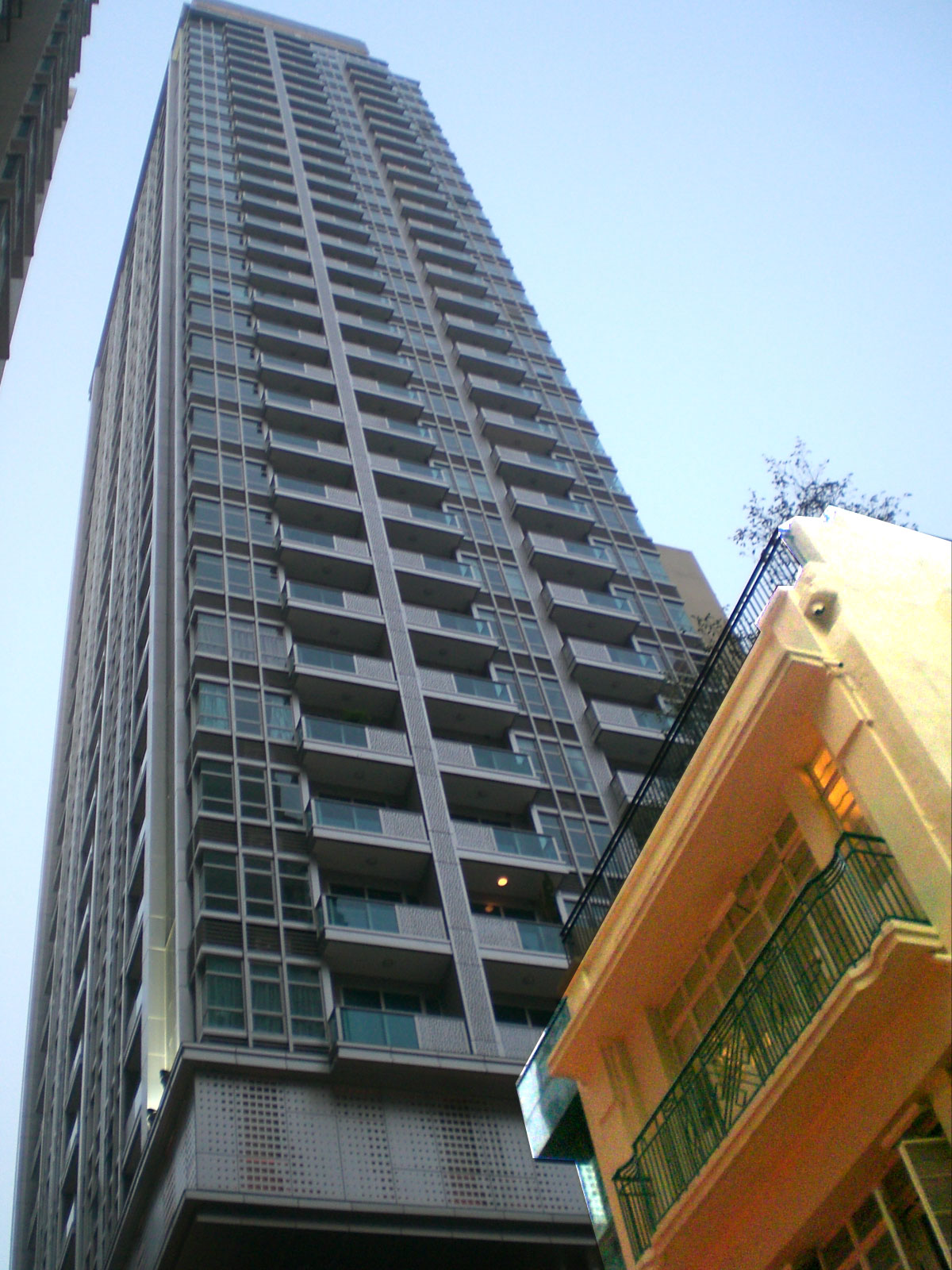
J Residence, Ship Street, HK
