= Tung Chi College =

Private school in Hong Kong

Coordinates: 22.274876°N 114.169934°E

Tung Chi College (Chinese: 同濟中學) was a private secondary school located at No. 15, Kennedy Road, in Wan Chai, Hong Kong, established by the Kuomintang. The building has been mostly demolished.

== History ==
The school was established in February 1936. Before being located at Kennedy Road, the school had been located at Hennessy Road and later at Wan Chai Road.

The college stopped admitting students in the 1970s. In the mid-1980s, the building was damaged by a fire.

The school was featured in several films, including the 1992 Hong Kong film Shogun and Little Kitchen (夥頭福星).
